= Lyric Opera (disambiguation) =

Lyric Opera is an opera company in Chicago. Other companies or opera houses with that name include:

- Asheville Lyric Opera, North Carolina
- Austin Lyric Opera, Texas, former name of Austin Opera
- Lyric Opera Baltimore, Maryland
- Lyric Opera House, former name of the Modell Performing Arts Center in Baltimore
- Baltimore Lyric Opera, former name of the Baltimore Opera Company
- Boston Lyric Opera, Massachusetts
- Lyric Opera Cleveland, merged with Opera Cleveland (2007–2010)
- Connecticut Lyric Opera, New London
- Lyric Opera of Kansas City, Missouri
- Lyric Opera of Los Angeles
- Philadelphia Lyric Opera Company, Pennsylvania (1958–1974)
- Lyric Opera of San Antonio, Texas, former name of San Antonio Opera
- Lyric Opera San Diego, California
- Lyric Opera of Virginia (defunct since 2017)
- Lyric Opera of Queensland, former name of Opera Queensland, Australia

== See also ==
- Lyric Theatre (disambiguation)
