= Steven LaBrie =

American singer

- Born: March 4, 1988 (age 38); Dallas, Texas, U.S.
- Genres: Classical crossover; opera; romantic
- Occupation: Singer
- Years active: 2010–present
- Member of: Il Divo
- Website: stevenlabrie.org

Steven LaBrie (born March 4, 1988) is an American baritone who has had an international performance career in operas and concerts. A native of Dallas, Texas, he was trained as an opera singer at the Academy of Vocal Arts in Philadelphia. He made his debut with Opera New Jersey in 2010, and has since performed in leading roles with a variety of opera companies; including the Washington National Opera, Seattle Opera, Dallas Opera, San Diego Opera, the Florida Grand Opera, Opera Hong Kong in China, and the Tyrolean Festival Erl in Austria.

Some of the roles LaBrie has performed on the opera stage include Figaro in Rossini's The Barber of Seville, Escamillo in Bizet's Carmen, Belmote in Donizetti's The Elixir of Love, Marcello in Puccini's La bohème, and Count Almaviva in Mozart's The Marriage of Figaro. On the concert stage he has appeared as a soloist in performances with the New York City Ballet, the San Antonio Symphony, the Tulsa Symphony, and the Studio de musique ancienne de Montréal among other organizations. In 2023 he became a member of Il Divo after previously touring with that classical crossover vocal group in 2022 following the death of Carlos Marín. He can be heard on the group's 2024 album XX.

== Early life and education ==
Born and raised in Dallas, Texas, LaBrie grew up performing with mariachi bands due to the influence of his Mexican mother. He became interested in opera after seeing a performance of La bohème in elementary school. After graduating from high school he attended the Academy of Vocal Arts (AVA) in Philadelphia. He portrayed Figaro in AVA's 2012 production of The Barber of Seville; having previously sung the role of Fiorello in that opera in 2006 during his first year at AVA. Other operas he performed in at AVA included Káťa Kabanová (2008, as Kuligin), Emmerich Kálmán's Sari (2008), and Don Pasquale (2009, as Dr. Malatesta).

== Vocal competitions ==
In 2008, at the age of 20, LaBrie won second prize in the junior division of the Palm Beach Opera Vocal Competition. In 2009 he won first place in the Dallas Opera Guild Vocal Competition . In 2013 he won the Grand Prize in the junior division of the Young Patronesses of the Opera Voice Competition sponsored by the Florida Grand Opera. That same year he was the recipient of the Encouragement Award from the George London Music Foundation after competing in the George London Competition (GLC). He later won the top prize at the GLC in 2016.

Additionally, LaBrie has been awarded Fourth Prize at both the Licia Albanese Puccini Foundation Competition and the Giulio Gari Foundation Competition and the 2015 Gilda Morelli Prize for Best Vocal and Dramatic Interpretation of an Aria at the Concurso Nacional de Canto Carlo Morelli in Mexico City, which was especially chosen by tenor Francisco Araiza.

== Career ==
=== 2010s ===
While a student at AVA, LaBrie made his professional opera debut in 2010 with Opera New Jersey as Morales in Carmen with Kirstin Chávez stepping into the title role to replace Denyce Graves. While a member of the young artist program at the Glimmerglass Opera (GO) he portrayed Araspe in GO's 2010 production of Handel's Tolomeo. In 2011 he was a soloist in the 25th anniversary concert of the Ocean City Pops (OCP) orchestra, and later sang with the OCP in the concert "A Night in Vienna" with violinist David Kim in 2013. In October 2013 he made his first appearance at the Dallas Opera as Dancaïro in Carmen.

In 2014 LaBrie performed the roles of Raimbaud in Rossini's Le comte Ory at the Des Moines Metro Opera, the Secret Police Agent in The Consul at the Seattle Opera, and made his debut at the Washington National Opera as Schaunard in La bohème. He repeated the role of Schaunard at the Dallas Opera in 2015. In December 2014 he performed Franz Schubert's song cycle Die schöne Müllerin to accompany choreographer Jessica Lang's ballet The Wanderer which was staged at the Brooklyn Academy of Music. He repeated this work at Jacob's Pillow the following year.

In December 2015 and December 2016 LaBrie was a soloist in Bach's Christmas Oratorio with the Studio de musique ancienne de Montréal and conductor Jean-Marie Zeitouni. In February 2016 he performed as a singer with the New York City Ballet in Christopher Wheeldon’s Estancia which featured music by Alberto Ginastera. He later toured in this production for performances in Paris for his first performances in Europe. In March 2016 he performed the role of Figaro in Rossini's The Barber of Seville with the Lyric Opera Baltimore at the Modell Performing Arts Center. The following month he sang Matthias Pintscher's Songs from Solomon's Garden with the American Composers Orchestra at Zankel Hall in New York, and was a soloist in Ralph Vaughan Williams's cantata Dona nobis pacem with the Juneau Symphony in Alaska.

LaBrie performed in two roles at the Bard SummerScape festival in 2016: Pang in Puccini's Turandot and Barak in Busoni's Turandot. Later that year he was the baritone soloist in Orff's Carmina Burana with the San Antonio Symphony (SAS) led by Sebastian Lang-Lessing, and appeared with Opera Omaha as Marcello in La bohème.

In March 2017 he portrayed Count Almaviva in The Marriage of Figaro with North Carolina Opera. In October 2017 he performed the title role in Felix Mendelssohn's Elijah with SAS in 2017. That same year he was the baritone soloist in Brahms' A German Requiem with the Tulsa Symphony, and repeated the role of Figaro with Opera Hong Kong in China.

With fellow baritones Jarrett Ott and Tobias Greenhalgh Labrie made the 2018 album Remember which featured songs by American composers. That same year he portrayed the matador Escamillo in Carmen at Sarasota Opera, Rossini's Figaro to Sarah Coburn's Rosina at Tulsa Opera, and Riolobo in Florencia en el Amazonas at the Florida Grand Opera.

In 2019 LaBrie made his European opera debut as the Hunter and Innkeeper in Rusalka at the Tyrolean Festival Erl in Austria, and sang in concert with the Orquesta Filarmónica del Estado de Chihuahua in Mexico. That same year he portrayed the Miller in the Gotham Chamber Opera's production of Xavier Montsalvatge's Puss and Boots; a role he had sung earlier with the company in 2010. In February 2019 he portrayed Belcore in The Elixir of Love with Opera Omaha, and the following month he performed as Charlie in Jake Heggie's Three Decembers at the San Diego Opera. In summer of 2019 he performed the role of Valdeburgo in Bellini’s La Straniera with Teatro Nuovo.

=== 2020s ===
In 2021 LaBrie portrayed Billy Bigelow in Rodgers and Hammerstein's Carousel at the Central City Opera. He was a special guest on tour with classical crossover vocal quartet Il Divo since February 2022. On August 17, 2023 he was named a member of the group. He toured Asia with Il Divo in 2023. He has subsequently toured with the group in Europe and North America. He is featured on the group's 2024 album XX.

== Personal life ==
LaBrie is gay.
