= Jean Mouton =

French composer

Jean Mouton (c. 1459 – 30 October 1522) was a French composer of the Renaissance. He was famous both for his motets, which are among the most refined of the time, and for being the teacher of Adrian Willaert, one of the founders of the Venetian School.

== Life ==
He was born Jean de Hollingue either in 1459 or earlier, but records of his early life, as is so often the case with Renaissance composers, are scant. Most likely he was from the village of Haut-Wignes (now Wirwignes), near Boulogne-sur-Mer, in Samer. He probably began his first job, singer and teacher at the collegiate church in Saint Omer, then moved to Nesle (southeast of Amiens) in 1477, where he served as a chorister for the next six years. In 1483, he was made maître de chapelle there. Sometime around this time he became a priest, and he is believed to have studied with Josquin des Prez.

In 1500 he was in charge of choirboys at the cathedral in Amiens. In 1501 he was in Grenoble, again teaching choirboys, but he left the next year, most likely entering the service of Queen Anne of Brittany, and in 1509 he was granted a position again in Grenoble which he could hold in absentia. Mouton was now the principal composer for the French court. For the remainder of his life he was employed by the French court in one capacity or another, often writing music for state occasions—weddings, coronations, papal elections, births and deaths.

Mouton composed a motet, Christus vincit, for the election of Leo X as pope in 1513. Leo evidently liked Mouton's music, for he rewarded him with the honorary title, apostolic notary on the occasion of a motet he composed for the pope in 1515; the pope made this award during a meeting in Bologna between the French king and the pope after the Battle of Marignano. This trip to Italy was the first, and probably only trip that Mouton made outside France.

Sometime between 1517 and 1522 the Swiss music theorist Heinrich Glarean met Mouton, and praised him effusively; he wrote that "everyone had copies of his music." Glarean used several examples of Mouton's music in his influential treatise, the Dodecachordon.

Mouton may have been the editor of the illuminated manuscript known as the Medici Codex, one of the primary manuscript sources of the time, which was a wedding gift for Lorenzo de' Medici.

It is considered to be possible that Mouton was in charge of the elaborate musical festivities by the French at the meeting between François I and Henry VIII at the Field of the Cloth of Gold, based on the similarity to the festivities five years earlier after the Battle of Marignano.

Near the end of his life, Mouton moved to Saint-Quentin. According to the engraving on his tombstone, he became a canon at the collegiate church of Saint-Quentin, taking over for Loyset Compère who died in 1518. Mouton died in Saint-Quentin and is buried there. The headstone, now missing, was engraved as follows:

CI GIST MAISTRE JEAN DE HOLLINGUE, DIT MOUTON,
EN SON VIVANT CHANTRE DU ROY
CHANOINE DE THEROUANNE ET DE CETTE EGLISE
QUI TRESPASSA LE PENULTIEME JOUR D'OCTOBRE MDXXII
PRIEZ DIEU POUR SON AME

== Music and influence ==
Mouton was hugely influential both as a composer and as a teacher. Of his music, 9 Magnificat settings, 15 masses, 20 chansons, and over 100 motets survive; since he was a court composer for a king, the survival rate of his music is relatively high for the period, it being widely distributed, copied, and archived. In addition, the famous publisher Ottaviano Petrucci printed an entire volume of Mouton's masses (early in the history of music printing, most publications contained works by multiple composers). His work was also published by Pierre Attaingnant.

The style of Mouton's music has superficial similarities to that of Josquin des Prez, using paired imitation, canonic techniques, and equal-voiced polyphonic writing: yet Mouton tends to write rhythmically and texturally uniform music compared to Josquin, with all the voices singing, and with relatively little textural contrast. Glarean characterized Mouton's melodic style with the phrase "his melody flows in a supple thread."

Around 1500, Mouton seems to have become more aware of chords and harmonic feeling, probably due to his encounter with Italian music. At any rate this was a period of transition between purely linear thinking in music, in which chords were incidental occurrences as a result of correct usage of intervals, and music in which the harmonic element was foremost (for example in lighter Italian forms such as the frottola, which are homophonic in texture and sometimes have frankly diatonic harmony).

Mouton was a fine musical craftsman throughout his life, highly regarded by his contemporaries and much in demand by his royal patrons. His music was reprinted and continued to attract other composers even later in the 16th century, especially two joyful Christmas motets he wrote, Noe, noe psallite noe, and Quaeramus cum pastoribus, which several later composers used as the basis for masses.

He also influenced posthumously the outstanding music theorist Gioseffo Zarlino, himself a pupil of Willaert, who referred to him, somewhat enthusiastically as his "precettore".

== Works list ==
=== Masses and mass fragments ===
1. Missa "Alleluia Confitemini Domino"
2. Missa "Alma redemptoris mater"
3. Missa "Argentum et aurum (lost)"
4. Missa "Benedictus Dominus Deus"
5. Missa "Dictes moy toutes vos pensées"
6. Missa "Ecce quam bonum"
7. Missa "Lo serai je dire"
8. Missa "Faulte d'argent"
9. Missa "l'Homme armé"
10. Missa "Quem dicunt homines"
11. Missa "Regina mearum"
12. Missa "sans candence"
13. Missa sine nomine 1 (without a name)
14. Missa sine nomine 2 (without a name)
15. Missa "tu es Petrus"
16. Missa "Tua est potentia"
17. Missa "Verbum bonum"
18. Credo (fragment)

=== Motets (selected) ===
1. Antequam comedam suspiro
2. Ave Maria - virgo serena for five voices, in two parts.
3. Benedicam Dominum
4. Exalta Regina Galliae (written to celebrate the French victory at the battle of Marignano, September 13–14, 1515)
5. Missus est Gabriel
6. Nesciens mater for eight voices, a tour de force of canon writing, being a quadruple canon at an interval of the fifth, proceeding a space of two measures.
7. Non nobis Domine (written for the birth of the Princess Renée, October 25, 1510)
8. O Maria piissima; Quis dabit oculis nostris (on the death of Queen Anna, January 9, 1514)
9. Quaeramus cum pastoribus for four voices, in two parts.
10. Salve Mater Salvatoris ].

=== Chansons (selected) ===
1. La la la l'oysillon du bois
2. Qui ne regrettroit le gentil Févin (Deploration on the death of Févin, 1511–1512)

== Recordings ==
- Heavenly Spheres, CBC Records, MVCD 1121, sung by Studio de musique ancienne de Montréal. Contains one motet by Mouton, Nesciens mater (for eight voices).
- Flemish Masters, Virginia Arts Recordings, VA-04413, performed by Zephyrus. Includes Mouton's motet, Nesciens mater, the Obrecht Missa Sub tuum presidium, as well as motets by Willaert, Clemens non Papa, Ockeghem, Des Prez, and Gombert.
- Josquin Desprez: Missa de Beata Virgine; Jean Mouton: Motets. Harmonia Mundi, HMU 907136, 1995. Performers: Theatre of Voices, directed by Paul Hillier. Includes 5 motets by Mouton, interwoven with the movements of Josquin's mass. By Mouton: (1) Nesciens Mater; (2) Ave Maria Virgo Serena; (3) Ave Sanctissima Maria; (4) O Maria Piissima; (5) Ave Maria Gemma Virginum.
- Choral Works of Jean Mouton recorded by The Gentlemen of St John's. Includes Nesciens Mater, Salva nos, Domine, Sancti Dei omnes, Missa Dictes moy toutes vos pensées. Nesciens Mater (track 1) was awarded 2nd best Christmas track by Gramophone magazine (2007).
- Vivat Rex!: Sacred Choral Music of Jean Mouton. Suspicious Cheese Lords, 2008, produced by Tina Chancey of Hesperus. Includes a full performance of the previously unrecorded Missa "Alma Redemptoris mater" and eight previously unrecorded Mouton motets.
- Missa Dictes moy toutes vos pensées; 5 Motets, Qui débit oculis ? (Lament for Anna), Ave Maria benedicta tu, Salva nos Domine, Ave Maria virgo serena, Nesciens mater for 8 voices, The Tallis Scholars, conducted by Peter Philipps CD Gimell Records 2012. Diapason d'or - Choc de Classica.
- Missa Tua est potentia, Motet Tua est potentia, Motet Salva nos Domine, Motet Da pacen Domine. Cappella Pratensis, conductor by Stratton Bull CD Challenge 2021
