= Benedetto Pallavicino =

Italian Renaissance composer and organist

Benedetto Pallavicino (c. 1551 – 26 November 1601) was an Italian composer and organist of the late Renaissance. A prolific composer of madrigals, he was resident at the Gonzaga court of Mantua in the 1590s, where he was a close associate of Giaches de Wert, and a rival of his younger contemporary Claudio Monteverdi.

== Biography ==
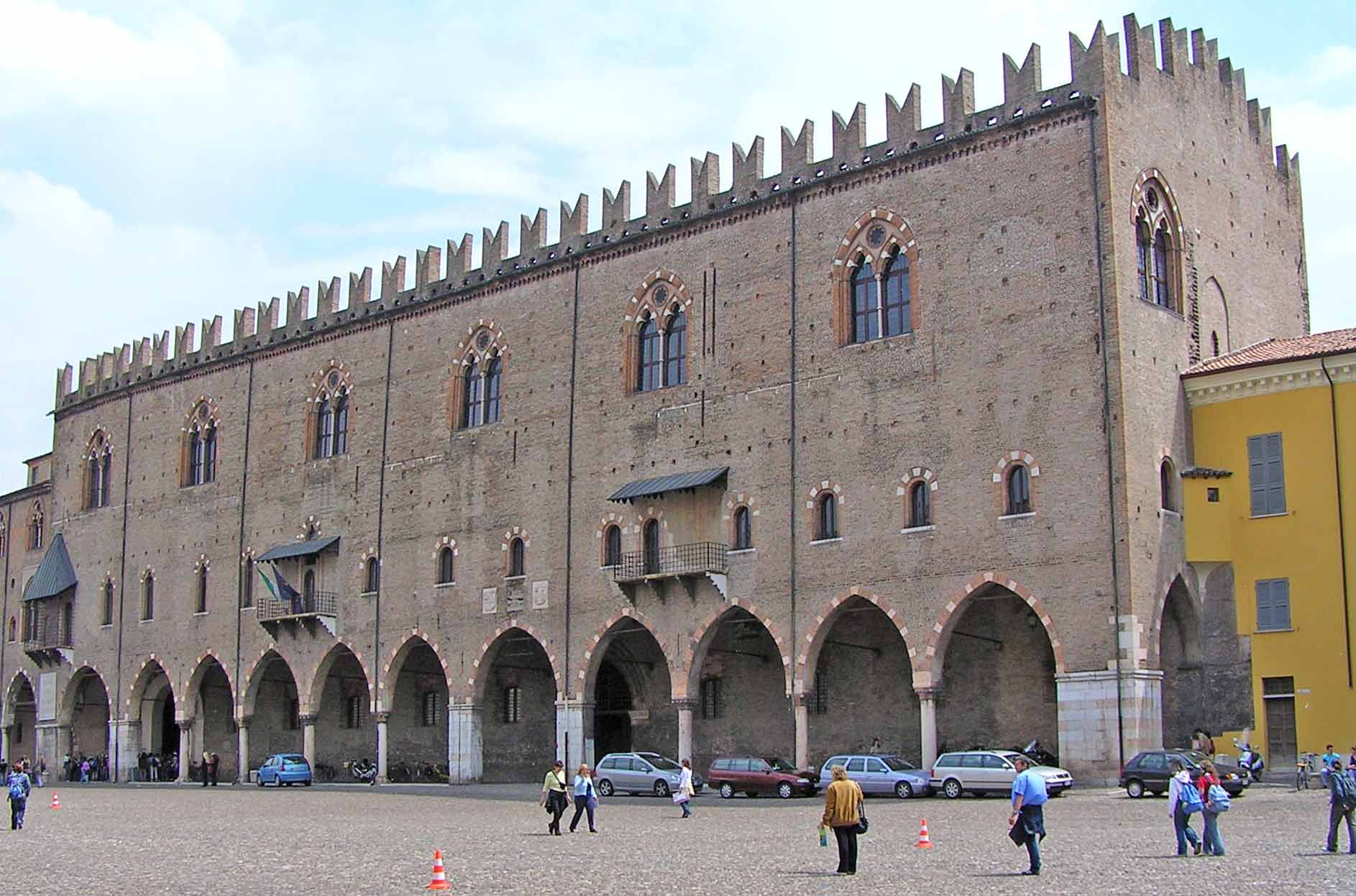
Ducal palace at Mantua, where Pallavicino was employed variously as singer, composer, and music director, from 1583 until 1601.

He was born in Cremona in either 1550 or 1551. While little is known about his early life, a mid-17th century document by Cremonese writer Giuseppe Bresciani indicates he served as an organist at several churches in the Cremona region while young, and it is possible he studied with Marc' Antonio Ingegneri, the same man who was the teacher of Monteverdi. His older brother Germano was also a prominent local organist. The Gonzaga family employed Benedetto at Sabbioneta beginning in 1579 and probably lasting until 1581, first as a singer, and in 1583 he began service with the Gonzagas in Mantua, a musical center of immense importance in the last decades of the 16th century; he stayed there for the rest of his life. While there he associated with some of the most famous composers of the last two decades of the 16th century, including Giaches de Wert, Francesco Soriano, Giovanni Giacomo Gastoldi, Francesco Rovigo, Alessandro Striggio, and Claudio Monteverdi, over 15 years his junior. According to the music historian K. Bosi Monteath, his relationship with Monteverdi was one of considerable animosity, although he offers no direct evidence of this.

A letter of 29 October 1583, preserved in the Biblioteca Comunale in Mantua, is the earliest surviving documentation of his service to the Gonzaga family. While in their service – first for Guglielmo Gonzaga, and then for Vincenzo, when Guglielmo died in 1587 – he made periodic trips to Venice in an official capacity, to examine singers at St. Mark's, and to supervise musical publications (since Venice was the center of music printing at the time, and other cities such as Mantua depended on their services). In 1589, likely dissatisfied at his low pay at the Gonzaga court, Pallavicino began seeking other employment, such as the position of maestro di cappella at Verona Cathedral; he was, however, unsuccessful, as the position went to Giammateo Asola.

In 1596, on the death of renowned composer Giaches de Wert, he was finally appointed to the premier musical position in the Gonzaga establishment, the maestro della musica, a position he was to retain until his own death in 1601, at which time it was given to Claudio Monteverdi, his most bitter rival. The preference of Pallavicino over Monteverdi for the post is unsurprising, considering that Monteverdi at the time had none of Pallavicino's popularity, and was only in his twenties, while Pallavicino was in his mid-forties; and Pallavicino had served the Gonzaga family for a long time. That considerable animosity existed between the two composers has been inferred from contemporary writings, particularly the exchange of letters following Giovanni Artusi's famous attacks on Monteverdi's style in 1600 and 1603, as well as the habit both men had of taking madrigals written by the other, and "improving" them.

In his later years, for which documentation is scant, he received support from the Accademia Filarmonica of Verona, an organization founded about sixty years before, with whom many other earlier composers had been associated, including prominent musicians such as Jan Nasco, Vincenzo Ruffo and Marc' Antonio Ingegneri, the teacher of Monteverdi. In September 1601 there is a note in the Mantuan archives indicating that Pallavicino pleaded for a debt to be forgiven, as he had children to support, and many other debts, and he died in the next month. His death certificate lists "fever" as the cause, and his age at death as 50, thus establishing his birth year as either 1550 or 1551. According to Alfred Einstein, he spent the last years of his life as a monk of the Camaldolese order of Benedictines.

Benedetto Pallavicino had a son named Bernardino; the similarity of their names, and apparent continuation of Benedetto's publishing activities, caused many musicologists to believe he lived well into the 17th century, until the discovery of his death notice, which gave a precise date. His son was a monk of the Camaldolese order of San Marco, and published several volumes of his father's work posthumously, including his seventh and eighth book of madrigals.

== Music and influence ==
Pallavicino was famous mainly for his secular music, in particular his madrigals, of which he wrote ten books, the last two of which were published posthumously by his son. In addition to his madrigals, he also left a small body of sacred vocal works. Either he wrote no solely instrumental music, or none has survived.

=== Madrigals ===
His madrigals use from four to six voices, and show the influence of several of the prominent stylistic trends of the time. There is a gradual progression from an early dense imitative and polyphonic style, to one making use of most of the trends current at Mantua and Ferrara, including the seconda pratica style of declamatory writing, which was one of the musical characteristics defining the beginning of the Baroque era.

Unlike Monteverdi, for whom it was a defining characteristic of his polyphonic madrigals, Pallavicino generally ignored the possibilities for dramatic characterization inherent in the texts he set, especially in his earlier books. This was the period in which the precursors of opera were being written, and one of the prominent madrigalian trends was to take dialogue, monologue, or straight narrative texts and set them with appropriate characterization. In this respect he was a conservative. Yet he also experimented with unprepared dissonance in precisely the way which Artusi so fiercely criticized Monteverdi – and remained on the list of composers which that famous reactionary critic considered to be exemplars of correct polyphonic practice – but most likely because Artusi had never heard his last books of madrigals.

The ten books of madrigals show a gradual absorption of the styles of other composers in the orbit of the courts of Mantua and Ferrara, particularly Wert. In the first book, Pallavicino wrote mostly in an imitative style similar to that of previous generations of composers, and related to the polyphonic style of sacred music. By the fourth book, Pallavicino was experimenting with sudden and extreme contrasts of texture rhythm, devices later taken to an extreme in the works of Carlo Gesualdo, but seen earlier in Wert. The influence of Luzzasco Luzzaschi is also evident in this book, particularly in the virtuosic writing for high female voices, including ornamentation and voice exchange techniques reminiscent of the music being composed for the famous three singers, the Concerto delle donne, of Ferrara.

It is in his sixth book of madrigals, published in 1600, the year traditionally (and arbitrarily) marking the end of the musical Renaissance, that his shift to the new style of the seconda pratica is most prominent. The madrigals, mostly based on texts by Giovanni Battista Guarini – by far the favorite poet of madrigal composers of the time – are written in a largely homophonic and declamatory style which is highly attentive to text accentuation and rhythm. It is also in this book that he uses some of the musical devices that were to make Monteverdi famous, such as the unprepared dissonance that so horrified Artusi, as well as previously forbidden melodic intervals such as diminished fourths; he also exploits cross relations for expressive effect. Curiously, he also frequently uses the interval of the falling sixth, a characteristic of Monteverdi's – though which learned it from the other is uncertain.

=== Sacred music ===
In his sacred music, which consists of masses, motets, and psalm settings, Pallavicino shows the influence of the Venetians, with large, spatially separated choirs, and he often wrote music for relatively large forces. He published books of motets for 8, 12, and 16 independent voices. These compositions are mainly homophonic in texture, aiming more for effect through alternation of sonority than counterpoint, a characteristic of the Venetian polychoral style.

His masses are for four to six voices, and in the conservative polyphonic style of the High Renaissance; they use the parody technique, and some are based on motets by Lassus and Giaches de Wert.

It is not known which churches he wrote his music for; the church where he worked, Santa Barbara, contains no mention of his compositions in their archives, and it has been suggested that he may have written them for other churches in Mantua, such as San Andrea and San Marco.

=== Influence and modern appraisal ===
Pallavicino's music was popular at the time, and printed and reprinted after his death, in both Venice and Antwerp; his popularity is attested by the numerous reprints and copies of his madrigals, especially in anthologies, in locations as far away as England. Indeed, he is second only to Marenzio in the manuscript Drexel 4302 containing 100 of his madrigals, and his music appears in at least 20 separate English sources.

While Pallavicino was respected by most of his contemporaries, his achievement had been completely overshadowed by that of Monteverdi, at least until the last decades of the 20th century, during which the musical culture of cities such as Mantua and Ferrara has received considerable study, and Pallavicino's originality has again been appreciated.
