= Baltimore Philharmonia =

The Baltimore Philharmonia Orchestra is a musical group located in Baltimore, Maryland. The orchestra is primarily composed of volunteers, though the organization's website also makes mention of being partially "semi-professional" in nature. From the orchestra's description page:

The Baltimore Philharmonia Orchestra, Inc. is a not-for-profit community-based volunteer and semi-professional orchestra of accomplished musicians that incorporates performers of all ages to play the masterworks of the symphonic repertoire encouraging the love of classical music and providing a series of regular concerts to the community at no cost.

Founded in 1998 as an offshoot of the Gettysburg Symphony, the group has performed within the city and outside of Baltimore. While most concerts are held in a venue near the city line in Baltimore County, the orchestra has held performances as far away as one at 2012 concert in Ocean City. That performance was completed under the direction of Rubén Capriles, who came to the orchestra from a job with the Ciudad Guayana Symphony Orchestra in Venezuela.

Before Mr. Capriles' directorship, the orchestra performed under Raffaele Faraco, who had retired after 37 years of playing violin with the Baltimore Symphony Orchestra. While BSO musicians or substitutes are sometimes paid to fill out tough-to-fill positions, the Philharmonia's players are more likely to come from academic groups or other volunteer orchestras, such as the Prince George's Philharmonic, Hunt Valley Symphony, Hopkins Symphony Orchestra, Columbia Orchestra or Gettysburg Symphony.

== See also ==
- Lyric Opera Baltimore
- Concert Artists of Baltimore
- Peabody Institute
- Baltimore Symphony Orchestra
