= Francesco Rovigo =

Italian composer

Francesco Rovigo (1540/1541 – 7 October 1597) was an Italian composer and organist of the late Renaissance, active in Mantua and Graz.

== Life ==
Nothing is known of his life prior to 1570, when he went to Venice, already 29 or 30 years old, to receive a musical education with the renowned organist and composer Claudio Merulo of the Venetian School. By 1573 he was in Mantua, where he composed hymns which were used in the church of Santa Barbara, which was the ducal chapel of the Gonzaga family. He served that aristocratic family until 1582, when he went to Graz to work for Archduke Charles II of Austria both as court organist and music tutor to the Archduke's children. When the Archduke died in 1590 he returned to Mantua and resumed his former service of the Gonzaga family, specifically as organist at the chapel. While in Mantua, and under the patronage of the artistically inclined Gonzaga family, he was part of an illustrious group of composers that included some of the most famous in Italy, such as Alessandro Striggio, Giaches de Wert, Benedetto Pallavicino, Francesco Soriano, Giovanni Giacomo Gastoldi, and of course Claudio Monteverdi.

Monteverdi mentioned Rovigo him favorably in his letters, with none of the animosity reserved for Benedetto Pallavicino, another composer at the Mantuan court. Rovigo died at Mantua at the age of 56; he is buried in the crypt of the cathedral of Santa Barbara, near to the tomb of Giaches de Wert, who died the previous year.

== Music ==
Rovigo wrote a large quantity of sacred music, as well as madrigals and some instrumental music. Much of his music, including some canzonette both for voices and instruments, and his early hymns, has been lost. His sacred music was mostly intended for liturgical use, and includes settings of the mass, for up to 12 voices, in the Venetian style; litanies, three settings of the Magnificat, for six voices; a setting of the St. Luke Passion; and other works. He published one book of madrigals for five voices in Venice in 1581, and many of them were sufficiently popular to be reprinted in some well-known anthologies. His instrumental pieces included canzonas, and many were published in Milan.

Rovigo, along with Giaches de Wert, was one of the composers assigned the task of composing music for a performance of Guarini's Il pastor fido in 1591 or 1592. One of the singers of the court at Mantua, Evangelista Campagnolo, was to play the part of Silvio. The work was never performed: in 1596, the Gonzagas issued a separate commission for composition of the work, to Giovanni Giacomo Gastoldi, and some of his choruses have survived in his madrigal books. It is not known if any of Rovigo's music for the earlier dramatic musical production has survived, or indeed if he ever wrote any. This production was not an opera, though it would have had some characteristics in common with one; the earliest opera, Dafne, was still several years away.
