= Lyrical =

Lyrical may refer to:

- Lyrics, or words in songs
- Lyrical dance, a style of dancing
- Emotional, expressing strong feelings
- Lyric poetry, poetry that expresses a subjective, personal point of view
- Lyric video, a music video in which the song's words are the main element
- Lyrical Media, a film production company

== See also ==
- Lyric (disambiguation)
