= Lyric Theatre =

Lyric Theatre or Lyric Theater may refer to:

== Australia ==
- Lyric Theatre, Adelaide, former open-air cinema in Grote Street, Adelaide, 1912–c.1914
- Lyric Theatre, Brisbane part of the Queensland Performing Arts Centre, in Brisbane, Queensland
- Lyric Theatre, Hilton, former name of the Star Theatres in Hilton, a suburb of Adelaide, South Australia
- Lyric Theatre, Sydney (1911)
- Sydney Lyric theatre, within The Star casino in Sydney, New South Wales

== Canada ==
- Lyric Theater (Swift Current) in Saskatchewan

== Hong Kong ==
- Lyric Theatre, The Hong Kong Academy for Performing Arts

== Ireland ==
- Lyric Theatre, Dublin, a former theatre company
- Lyric Theatre, Belfast in Stranmillis, Belfast; also known as The Lyric Players Theatre

== United Kingdom ==
- Lyric Theatre (Hammersmith), Hammersmith, London
- Lyric Theatre, London, Shaftesbury Avenue, West End of London
- Lyric Theatre, part of The Lowry in Salford, Greater Manchester

== United States ==
- Lyric Theatre and Cultural Arts Center (Lexington, Kentucky)
- Lyric Theatre (Anniston, Alabama), listed on the National Register of Historic Places (NRHP) in Calhoun County, Alabama
- Lyric Theater (Birmingham, Alabama)
- Lyric Theatre (Harrison, Arkansas)
- Lyric Theater (Miami), Florida
- Lyric Theatre (Stuart, Florida)
- Lyric Baltimore
- Lyric Theater, Traverse City, Michigan; now the State Theatre
- Lyric Theatre, Virginia, Minnesota; now the Lyric Center for the Arts
- Lyric Theater (Oxford, Mississippi)
- Lyric Theater (Boonville, Missouri), listed on the NRHP in Cooper County, Missouri
- Lyric Theatre (Kansas City, Missouri)
- Lyric Theatre (New York City, 1903), now demolished
- Lyric Theatre (New York City, 1998)
- Lyric Theatre (Oklahoma City, Oklahoma)
- Lyric Theatre, Allentown, Pennsylvania; now the Miller Symphony Hall
- Lyric Theatre (Blacksburg, Virginia)
- Olympia Theatre (New York City), theatre known as the Lyric Theatre during the latter part of the 19th century
- Tally's Electric Theater, also known as Lyric Theatre, in Los Angeles
