= Crossing Over =

Crossing Over may refer to:

- Chromosomal crossover, a cellular process
- "Crossing Over" a song by Van Halen on the Japanese release of their 1995 album Balance
- Crossing Over, a 1998 album by Hesperus
- Crossing Over with John Edward, a 1999–2004 television show on which self-described psychic John Edward gives readings to audience members
- Crossing Over, a 2001 book by John Edward
- Crossing Over (film), a 2009 film
- "Crossing Over", a song by Five Finger Death Punch from the 2009 album War Is the Answer
- "Crossing Over", a season 4 (2010–2011) episode of Eureka
- "Crossing Over", a song by Lowen & Navarro
