= Concert Artists of Baltimore =

US chamber orchestra and vocal ensemble

Concert Artists of Baltimore is a combination chamber orchestra and vocal ensemble in Baltimore, Maryland. The group describes itself as being a 30-year-old institution entirely composed of paid professionals. This puts it on a tier above other non-BSO orchestras in Baltimore, such as the Soulful Symphony, Baltimore Choral Arts Society, Baltimore Philharmonia, Baltimore Chamber Orchestra, Peabody Institute ensembles and various academic orchestras. The unique nature of the group allows it to stage large orchestral/choral works at a level of quality only viable in-house for a few other institutions on the East Coast. It also puts the group in demand for collaborations, including a 2011 performance of Honegger's Joan of Arc which, with more than 600 participants, was so massive as to require three of the groups mentioned above.

== Structure ==
As of 2011, the group's orchestra added a second role, playing at least one show in the pit of Lyric Opera Baltimore. This partnership is likely to continue on some level, as the Baltimore Sun's classical music critic was not impressed by the performance of the more-expensive BSO in the Lyric's pit. The Lyric performance featuring the CAB orchestra, on the other hand, received a generally positive review for musicality from the same critic.

The group's director, Edward Polochik, has experience with the Peabody Institute, Lincoln's Symphony Orchestra and the Baltimore Symphony Orchestra. Frequent venues for the group over the years have included Friedberg Hall, Owings Mills' Gordon Center and the Baltimore Lyric Opera House. The group is governed by a 10-member board of directors and, according to The Baltimore Sun, has a budget of roughly $400,000 per year.

== Critical response ==
Over the decades, critics have had good and bad things to say about the group, with one typical example being a Baltimore City Paper writer who, in 2000, said Polochik's conducting was "expressive," even as he chastised the director's programming, noting that guitar soloist James Hontz "did his technical best but didn't communicate excitement, which, when playing technically challenging music composed of weak tunes, doesn't keep an audience awake."

Indeed, one of the hallmarks of the group is its willingness as a secondary orchestra to program less-known works: As an example, in 2005, while active as resident artists at Baltimore's Cathedral of Mary Our Queen, the group performed a show including Poulenc's 1938 Concerto for Organ, Strings, and Timpani in G Minor, followed by Haydn's "Lord Nelson" Mass—both works that would not frequently make it onto the programs of many large cities' "primary" orchestras.

== See also ==
- Lyric Opera Baltimore
- Cathedral of Mary Our Queen
- Peabody Institute
- Baltimore Symphony Orchestra
- Baltimore Philharmonia
