= Christopher Jackson (musician) =

Canadian musician

Christopher Donald Jackson (27 July 1948 – 25 September 2015) was a Canadian organist, harpsichordist and choral conductor. He is best known as a specialist in the performance of Renaissance music, and as the co-founder and long time conductor of the Studio de musique ancienne de Montréal.

== Early life and education ==
Jackson was born in Halifax, Nova Scotia. He graduated from the École de musique Vincent-d'Indy and the Conservatoire de musique du Québec à Montréal.

== Career ==
As a young man, Jackson worked as an organ builder. He began teaching at Concordia University in 1973. Jackson co-founded both the Société des Concerts d'orgue de Montréal and the Studio de musique ancienne de Montréal in 1974. As co-artistic director and later sole artistic director, he conducted the ensemble in several recordings, including the 1998 Heavenly Spheres, which was awarded a Félix Award from the ADISQ and the Juno Award for Classical Album of the Year – Vocal or Choral Performance in 2000.

Jackson taught at the music faculties of Concordia University and McGill University. He was Dean of the Faculty of Fine Arts at Concordia University from 1994 to 2005. He also held the post of organist and choirmaster at a variety of churches in Montreal, including Eglise Tres-Saint-Nom de Jesus, and St. George's Anglican Church.

Jackson received an honorary doctorate from Laurentian University in 1999 and was inducted as a member of the Royal Society of Canada in 2009.

In 2011 Jackson conducted the Studio de musique ancienne for the recording of an album, Musica Vaticana.

Jackson died of lung cancer on September 25, 2015 in Montreal, aged 67.

== Selected discography ==
- Heinrich Schütz : Christmas Story. CD Fonovox VOX7847-2 1981
- H. I. F. Biber : Vespers. CD REM311207 1993
- Giacomo Carissimi : Jonas, Jephté. Marc-Antoine Charpentier : le Reniement de Saint Pierre H.424. CD Analekta 1994
- André Campra, Henry Dumont : Le Chant de la Jérusalem des terres froides. CD K617 1995 (reissue Montréal et Indiens Abenakis 2001, Musique sacrée en Nouvelle-France ACD22764 2017)
- Henry Desmarest : 4 Motets Lorrains. 2 CD K617053 1995
- Palestrina : Missa Ut re mi fa sol la. CD Analekta
- Heavenly spheres - L’Harmonie des Sphères, Mouton, Gombert, Lassus, Morales, Palestrina, Victoria. CD CBC
- Sacred Spaces - Lieux sacrés, G. Gabrieli and Monteverdi CBC 2002
- Puer natus est Giovanni Gabrieli Concerto Palatino ACD22311 11/2003
- Arvo Pärt : Stabat Mater ACD22310 03/2004
- Marc-Antoine Charpentier : Messe à quatre chœurs H.4, 3 Psaumes des Ténèbres, H.228, H.229, H.230, Ensemble Stradivaria, Studio de Musique ancienne de Montréal. CD Atma 2005
- Rise, O my soul Bull, William Byrd, Orlando Gibbons, William Simmes, Thomas Tomkins, Ward, ACD22506 03/2007
- Roma Triumphans Luca Marenzio et al. SACD22507 01/2008
- Orlando di Lasso : Lagrime di San Pietro ACD22509 09/2010
- Musica Vaticana ACD22508 09/2011
- Splendore a Venezia (compilation) ACD23013 10/2013
- Terra Tremuit : Brumel Missa Et ecce terrae motus ACD22653 03/2014
- Orlando di Lasso : Laudate Dominum ACD22746 03/2017
