= Lyric =

Lyric may refer to:

- Lyrics, the words, often in verse form, which are sung, usually to a melody, and constitute the semantic content of a song
- Lyric poetry is a form of poetry that expresses a subjective, personal point of view
- Lyric, from the Greek language, a song that is played with a lyre
- Lyric describes, in the classification of the human voice in European classical music, a specific vocal weight and a range at the upper end of the given voice part
- RTÉ lyric fm, a radio station in Ireland
- Lyric (group), a rhythm and blues girl group
- "Lyric" (song), a single released in June 2003 by Zwan
- Lyric Hearing, an extended wear hearing aid
- The Lyric (magazine), a North American poetry magazine
- The Lyric (album), a 2005 jazz album by Jim Tomlinson and Stacey Kent
- Lyric (musician), Australian singer-songwriter
- Lyric Shen (born 1993), American visual artist

== See also ==
- Lyric Opera (disambiguation)
- Lyric Theatre (disambiguation)
- Lyrics (disambiguation)
- LYRIQ (disambiguation)
