= Wit and Mirth, or Pills to Purge Melancholy =

Book by Thomas d'Urfey

- Author: Thomas d'Urfey
- Subject: Folk music
- Genre: Music history

Wit and Mirth: Or Pills to Purge Melancholy is the title of a large collection of songs by Thomas d'Urfey, published between 1698 and 1720, which in its final, six-volume edition held over 1,000 songs and poems. The collection started as a single book compiled and published by Henry Playford who had succeeded his father John Playford as the leading music publisher of the period. Over the next two decades, Pills went through various editions and expanded into five volumes; in 1719 Thomas D'Urfey reordered and added to the work to produce a new edition (also in 5 volumes) with the title Songs Compleat, Pleasant and Divertive, published by Jacob Tonson. Volumes I and II now consisted entirely of songs with words by D'Urfey, "Set to Musick by Dr. John Blow, Mr. Henry Purcell, and other excellent masters of the town". The edition sold out quickly and in the second printing D'Urfey reverted to the Pills title. He added Volume 6 in 1720. The title itself may derive from a 1599 pamphlet "A Pil to Purge Melancholie".

== Later versions ==
In 1920 William Giles Whittaker published North Country Folk Song set for unaccompanied voices: Words from D'Urfey's "Pills to Purge Melancholy."

In 1956 Ed McCurdy recorded When Dalliance Was In Flower (and Maidens Lost Their Heads) Vol. 1 for Elektra Records. Volume 2 was issued in 1957 with Volume 3 coming in 1958. Son of Dalliance came along in 1959 and in 1961 Elektra issued The Best Of Dalliance. In 2005 Rhino Records issued a 28 track CD of The Best Of Dalliance. This was a more folky treatment than the one by Will Holt, who published an album of 10 songs entitled Pills to Purge Melancholy (Stinson SLP78). The songs are almost all ribald. In 1966 Gerald Cockshutt orchestrated 10 of the songs for a set of dances called Maddermarket Suite.

In 1968 S. A. J. Bradley published Sixty Ribald Songs from Pills to Purge Melancholy: Sixty Songs with Music. This served as a source for several folk singers. In 1990 the City Waites recorded Pills to Purge Melancholy (26 songs sung by Lucie Skeaping and Richard Wistreich). They followed up in 1995 with Bawdy Ballads of Old England. This time only a few of the songs were from D'Urfey's collection. In 1997 Kate Rusby released 'Sir Eglamore' on Hourglass. In 2000 Hesperus recorded the album My Thing Is My Own: Bawdy Songs of D'Urfey. In 2007 a 364-page edition of the collection appeared. It is not clear whether this contains the music as well as the words, or how many of songs are included.

== See also ==
- "Tom o' Bedlam"
- 1719 in poetry
- 1720 in poetry
