= Tina Chancey =

American musician

Tina Chancey is a multi-instrumentalist specializing in early bowed strings from the rebec and vielle to the kamenj, renaissance fiddle, violas da gamba and pardessus de viole.

== Early life and education ==
Chancey received her Bachelor's in Music and MA in performance from Queens College, City University of New York, her MA in Musicology from New York University, and her PhD in Musicology from the online Union Institute.

== Career ==
Chancey performed with The Folger Consort and started Hesperus, an early-traditional ensemble, with Scott Reiss in 1979.

Chancey is a specialist on the pardessus de viole (a 5-string hybrid viol/violin played on the lap during the 18th century), and received two grants from the National Endowment for the Arts to support solo performances on the pardessus de viole at the Kennedy Center and Weill Recital Hall at Carnegie Hall.

Chancey has written articles for publications such as Early Music America Magazine, as a book reviewer.

Chancey has also been a member of the Renaissance-Rock group Blackmore's Night (featuring Ritchie Blackmore of Deep Purple and Rainbow with his partner, Candice Night). Her stage name with them is "Tudor Rose."

== Discography ==
=== Hesperus, Tina Chancey and Scott Reiss ===
- Food of Love - Renaissance instrumental music from the British Isles.
- My Thing is My Own-Bawdy songs from D'Urfee's Pills to Purge Melancholy
- Dancing Day - Early and traditional Christmas music from around the world.
- Baroque Recorder Concerti - Concertos by Telemann, Vivaldi, Graupner, Naudot, and Babel featuring Scott Reiss as recorder soloist.
- Spain in the New World - renaissance and baroque music from Old and New Spain
- Celtic Roots - with Bonnie Rideout and William Taylor
- Luminous Spirit -Chants of Hildegard von Bingen with Rosa Lamoreaux
- I Love Lucette - 16th c. songs from the French secular theater, featuring Jane Hershey, Howard Bass and Rosa Lamoreaux
- Unicorn - Early/Traditional Crossover with Bruce Molsky and Bruce Hutton
- Neo-Medieval - Scott Reiss, Grant Herreid, Tina Chancey
- The Duo Guersan--Tina Chancey and Catharina Meints on two five-string pardessus de viole.
- Early American Roots- British Colonial
- Patchwork- Reprint of For No Good Reason at All
- Colonial America-More British Colonial
- The Banshee's Wail--Scott Reiss, medieval and Irish fusion with Glen Velez, Zan McLeod, Tina Chancey
- Fêtes Galantes - Music for various numbers of pardessus with Joanna Blendulf, Annalisa Pappano, Tina Chancey, Catharina Meints, John Mark Rozendaal and Webb Wiggins

=== As producer ===
- Vivat Rex!: Sacred Choral Music of Jean Mouton. Suspicious Cheese Lords, 2008
