= Il Divo =

Multinational vocal group

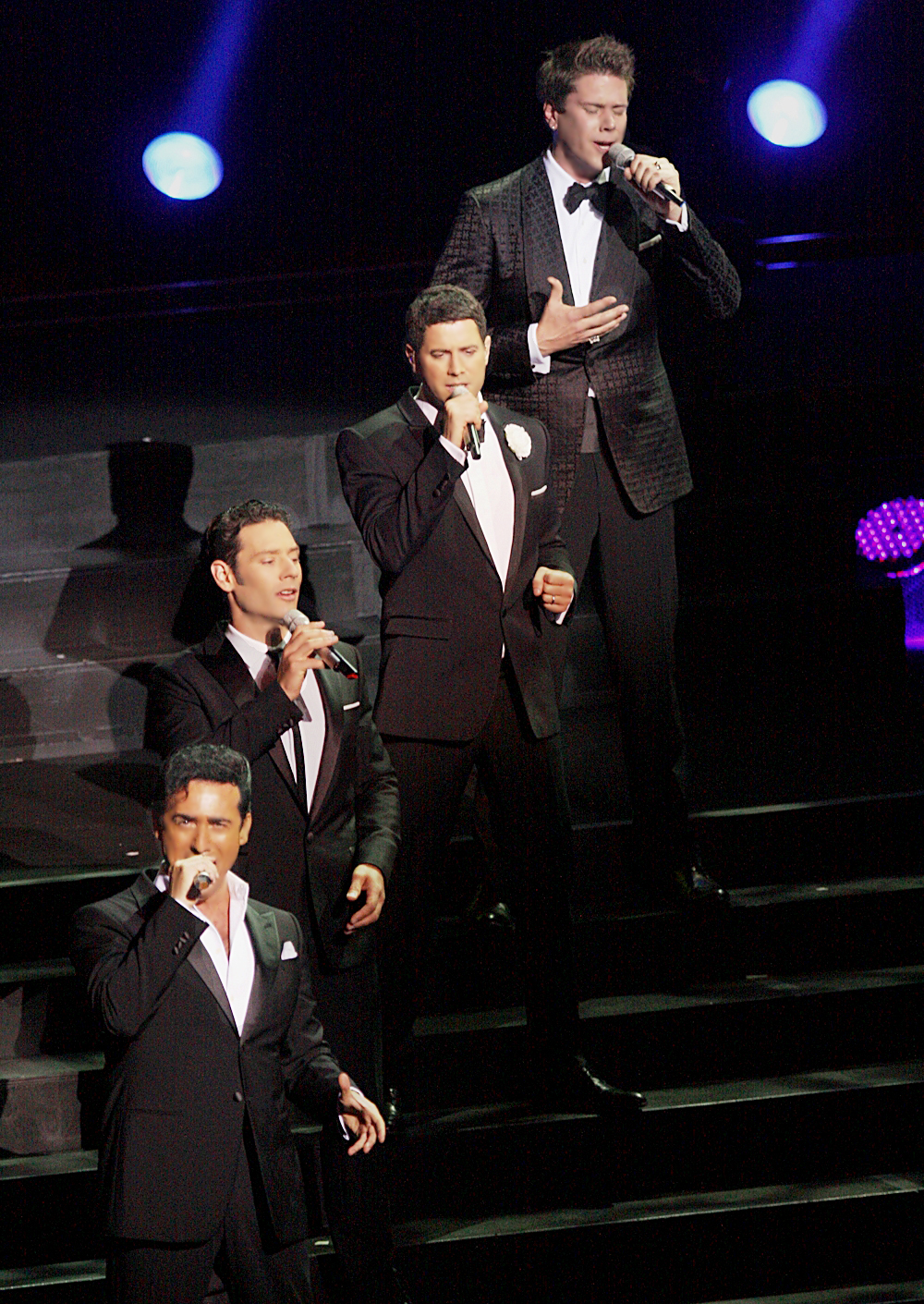
- Il Divo at the Sydney Opera House in 2012. From left to right: Carlos Marín, Urs Bühler, Sébastien Izambard and David Miller.

Background information
- Origin: Multi-national (tenors from France, Switzerland, Spain until 2021 and the United States)
- Genres: Classical crossover; operatic pop; folk; bolero; mambo; tango
- Years active: 2003–present
- Labels: Sony; Syco; Columbia; Universal Music Group
- Members: David Miller; Sébastien Izambard; Urs Bühler; Steven LaBrie
- Past members: Carlos Marín
- Website: ildivo.com

Il Divo (Italian pronunciation: [il ˈdiːvo]; transl. "The Star") are a multinational classical crossover vocal group. Formed in the United Kingdom in 2003, it is a male quartet that was created and then promoted by British media magnate Simon Cowell for Syco Music, a record label that he had administered. The original members selected by Simon Cowell are Swiss tenor Urs Bühler, American tenor David Miller, French tenor Sébastien Izambard, and Spanish baritone Carlos Marín.

As of 2025, the group has released ten studio albums: Il Divo (2004), The Christmas Collection (2005), Ancora (2005), Siempre (2006), The Promise (2008), Wicked Game (2011), A Musical Affair (2013), Amor & Pasión (2015), Timeless (2018), and For Once in My Life: A Celebration of Motown (2021); as well as a compilation album, The Greatest Hits (2012). Two other albums – An Evening with Il Divo: Live in Barcelona (2009) and Live in Japan (2014) – presented recordings of live concerts. The group has also collaborated with multiple other musical artists, with Barbra Streisand and Lea Salonga being examples.

Both the group's concerts and its studio releases are known for featuring a variety of languages. Examples include media in French (such as with "Pour Que Tu M'aimes Encore"), in Italian (such as with "Nella Fantasia"), and in Spanish (such with "Isabel"), with most of Il Divo's performances involving the Romance languages. The vocalists have additionally attracted notice due to their public image; for instance, they have almost exclusively worn suits by Giorgio Armani during their concerts and other social affairs.

Since its inception, Il Divo has enjoyed significant commercial success, with the group selling over thirty million copies of their albums worldwide as of 2018. An Australian news article has noted that, "[w]hile other copycat" type "bands were formed after Il Divo’s success", "most [of them] have split" and additionally Il Divo stands out due to the vocalists proactive choices in managing their output, such as with the tenor Miller directing the music video for their song "Hola". With 160 certified gold and platinum hits in 35 countries, the group has pioneered the genre of operatic pop, or "popera", in classical crossover music.

Il Divo's live concerts sold over two million concert tickets worldwide just from the group's first four albums. In its first world tour, concerts in 69 cities in 18 countries were sold out.

== Members ==
Il Divo was composed of four singers: former child performer, television and recording artist, and classical baritone Carlos Marin, born in Germany but raised in Spain; two classically trained tenors, Urs Bühler from Switzerland, and David Miller from the USA; and pop singer Sébastien Izambard, from France. Baritone Steven LaBrie, replaced Carlos Marin within days after Marin was hospitalized in Manchester during the 2021 UK Christmas tour. Labrie confirmed in several interviews he “joined” while Carlos Marin was in hospital. Until August 2023 Labrie was a special guest.

== Conception and name ==
The idea behind Il Divo came when Simon Cowell, inspired after listening to the Three Tenors, decided to form a multinational quartet of talented young singers to recreate the quality of Luciano Pavarotti, José Carreras, and Placido Domingo. Cowell searched worldwide for young singers who were willing to embark on the project from 21 January 2001, to 16 December 2003, when Miller was signed. Prior to Il Divo, each member enjoyed moderate success individually.

== Career ==
=== 2004–2006 ===
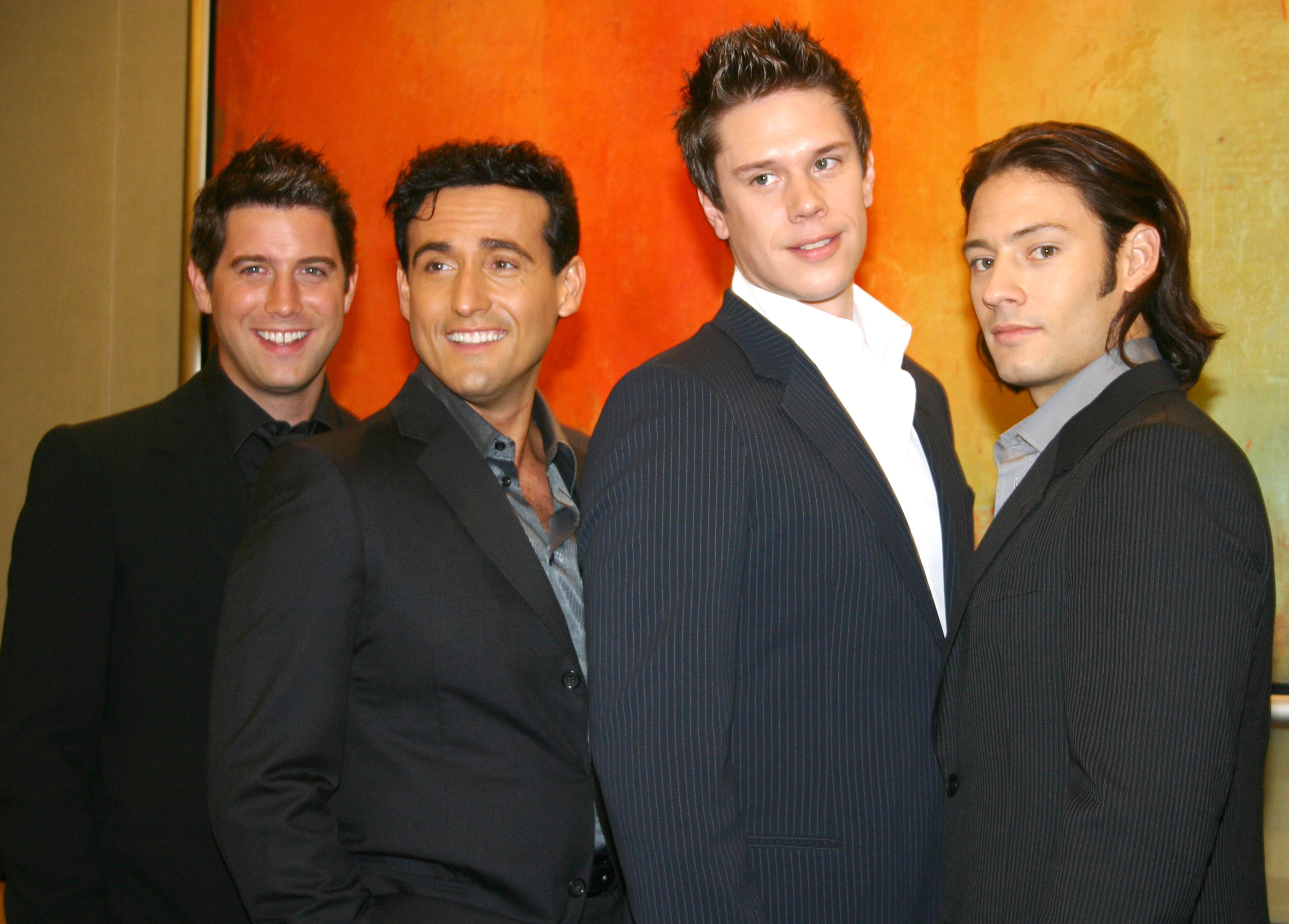
Il Divo in 2005

The first album, Il Divo, was recorded in February 2004 in Sweden. The album was released on 1 November 2004 in three countries: the UK, Norway and Ireland. In the first few weeks the group achieved double platinum in Norway and Ireland. On 19 April 2005 the album was released in the United States and Spain.

Il Divo was launched in fall 2004 with the single "Regresa a mí", debuting with the first album of the same name. The group filmed the music video for the song in Slovenia.

In December 2004, Il Divo held its first concert at Gotham Hall in New York. The group performed five songs from the album live. The concert was made into a film that became the group's first DVD release, Live at Gotham Hall.

On 23 May 2005, the group released Mama, which features the second official video of the song "Mama" recorded in Tropea, Italy.

On 24 January 2006, Sony BMG released Encore, a concert at the Roman Theatre in Mérida, Spain, recorded on 7 October 2005.

On 25 October 2005, the group released their second studio album The Christmas Collection in seven countries: the United States, Canada, Austria, Slovenia, the Netherlands, Sweden and Finland.

Il Divo's third studio album, Ancora, was released in Europe on 7 November 2005. In the United States and Latin America it was released on 24 January 2006. It debuted at number one on the Billboard 200 in its first week of release in the United States.

On 9 June 2006, Il Divo gave a live performance of the official 2006 FIFA World Cup song, "The Time of Our Lives", with Toni Braxton, at half-time during the opening match between Germany and Costa Rica, and again at the closing ceremony on 9 July.

Il Divo have been on several world tours and have received 50 gold and platinum discs. Their last tour in 2014 covered five continents and over 33 countries. Having completed a six-month tour of the United States, Australia, and Europe, Il Divo participated in Streisand as Barbra Streisand's special guests. The tour was ranked second for all tours during 2006, generating $92.5 million in gross sales.

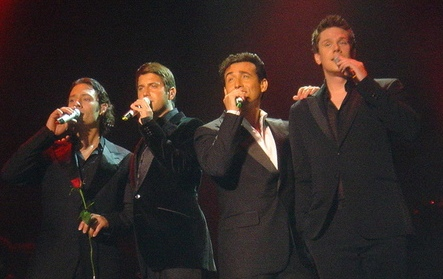
Il Divo in Kallang, concert in Singapore Indoor Stadium 18 January 2007

After the release of Ancora, the group spent almost half their time as the bestselling act in Europe, building on the success they achieved with their debut self-titled album. Throughout the Christmas period in 2006, Il Divo held the top spot in the list of best-selling albums.

Il Divo was named the Most Multinational UK No.1 Album Group in the 2006 edition of the Guinness Book of World Records.

=== 2006–2010 ===
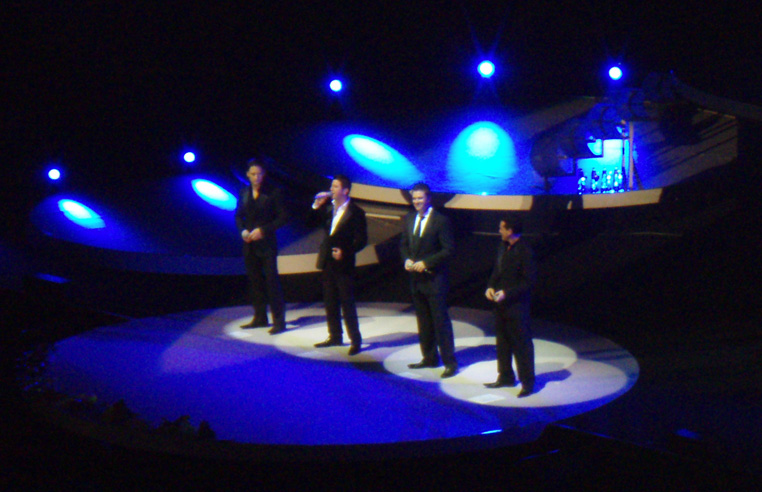
Il Divo in Rotterdam Ahoy, Rotterdam, Netherlands, 2 July 2007

On 7 November 2006 the group released their first compilation, Il Divo Collezione.

On 27 November 2006 they released their fourth studio album, Siempre, recorded during their previous world tour. On 16 January 2007, Il Divo began a tour to promote Siempre in Asia, Australia, Latin America Mexico, Colombia, Chile, Argentina, and Venezuela. On 21 November 2006 Il Divo released the Live at the Greek Theater DVD featuring the live concert held on 22 June 2006 at the Greek Theatre in Los Angeles as part of the 2006 world tour. This recording includes all the songs that had established the group's popularity and an unedited version of the famous song "Somewhere".

On 11 November 2008 the group released their fifth album, The Promise. The album's presentation was held at the Museu Nacional d'Art de Catalunya on 30 October, where Il Divo performed five songs from the new album.

At the Coliseum was released on 8 November 2008. It includes Il Divo's concert at the Roman Colosseum in Pula, Croatia.

On 12 December 2008, Il Divo performed at the finals of Idol 2008 in the Stockholm Globe Arena. On 20 January 2009 they performed at the Purple Heart Inauguration Ball in Washington DC for Barack Obama. Il Divo's 2009 tour, An Evening with Il Divo, was their most geographically extensive, with more than 130 dates across six continents, visiting 31 countries and 81 cities, earning them the Billboard Breakthrough Award for the highest-grossing tour of the year.

On 1 December 2009, the first live album An Evening with Il Divo: Live in Barcelona went public. The DVD + CD set includes "Bridge Over Trouble Water" and "The Impossible Dream" from Man of La Mancha.

They ended 2009 with their first Christmas special intimate show, Celebrate Christmas with Il Divo, which included a traditional repertoire of favourite festive songs with an orchestra and special guests in the United Kingdom, the United States, and Canada.

They started with two concerts at the Hammersmith Apollo in London on 7 and 8 December with violinist Vanessa-Mae and singer Camilla Kerslake, ending in the United States with six more concerts.

On 19 October 2010, Sony Music released The Yule Log: The Christmas Collection.

=== Artist of the Decade ===
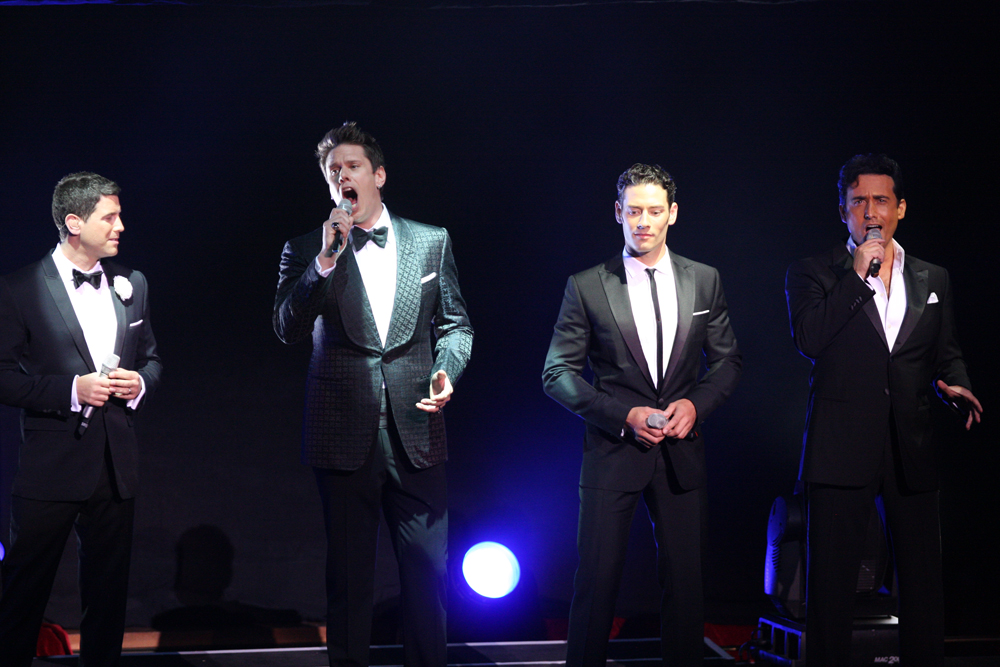
Il Divo live in Sydney 2012

On 11 May 2011, Il Divo were invited to the Classic Brit Awards at the Royal Albert Hall in London to receive the award for "Artist of the Decade". The award recognised the impact the operatic group had had in the classical genre, having sold over 25 million albums worldwide between 2004 and 2011.

On 8 November 2011, Wicked Game was released.

On 20 December 2011 in Paraguay, the quartet gave a concert in the Defensores del Chaco stadium for 33,900 people, closing the Bicentenary of the Independence of Paraguay. On 13 May 2012, Il Divo performed "Caruso" during the Diamond Jubilee of Elizabeth II at Windsor for the entire royal family. In 2008, Il Divo performed at the Olympic torch handover party leading up to the 2012 Summer Olympics in London.

Live in London, a 90-minute Il Divo concert at the London Coliseum, was published in mid-2011.

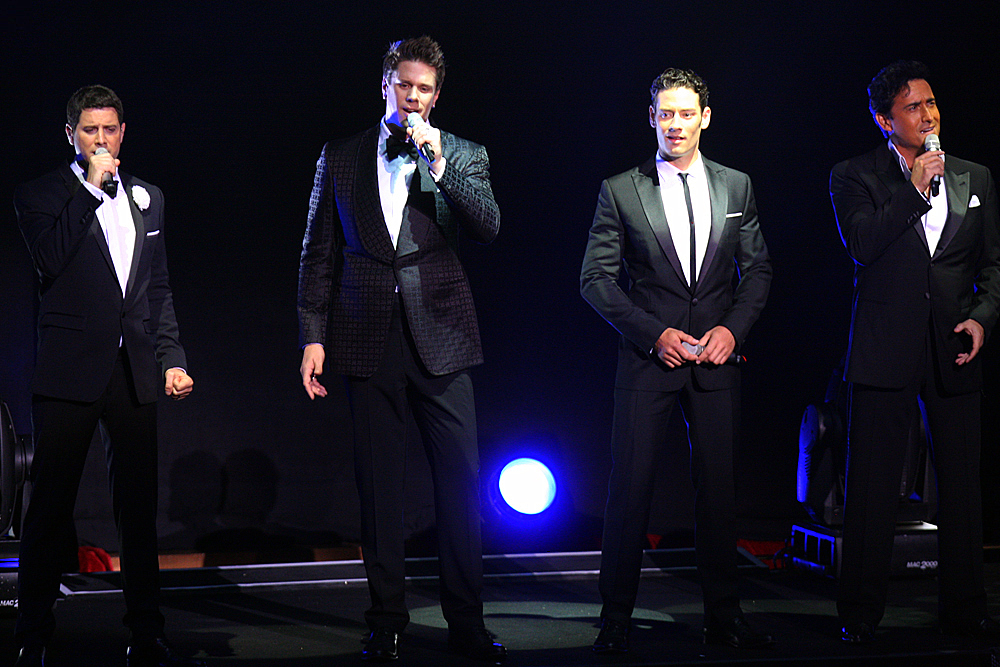
Il Divo live in Sydney on 14 February 2012

Il Divo & Orchestra in Concert World Tour was a worldwide tour of the six continents between May and September 2012. It was designed by creative director Brian Burke, who stated that "Il Divo is the perfect modern fusion of opera, theater, and concert. It is a privilege as a director to create a visual landscape inviting the audience on a theatrical journey of their music."

In November 2012, Il Divo released The Greatest Hits.

=== Il Divo on Broadway ===
The group's seventh album, A Musical Affair, was released on 5 November 2013. The songs featured arrangements tailored to the singers' voices. To promote the album, they held a concert at the Marquis Theatre on Broadway from 7 to 13 November 2013, called Il Divo – A Musical Affair: The Greatest Songs of Broadway.

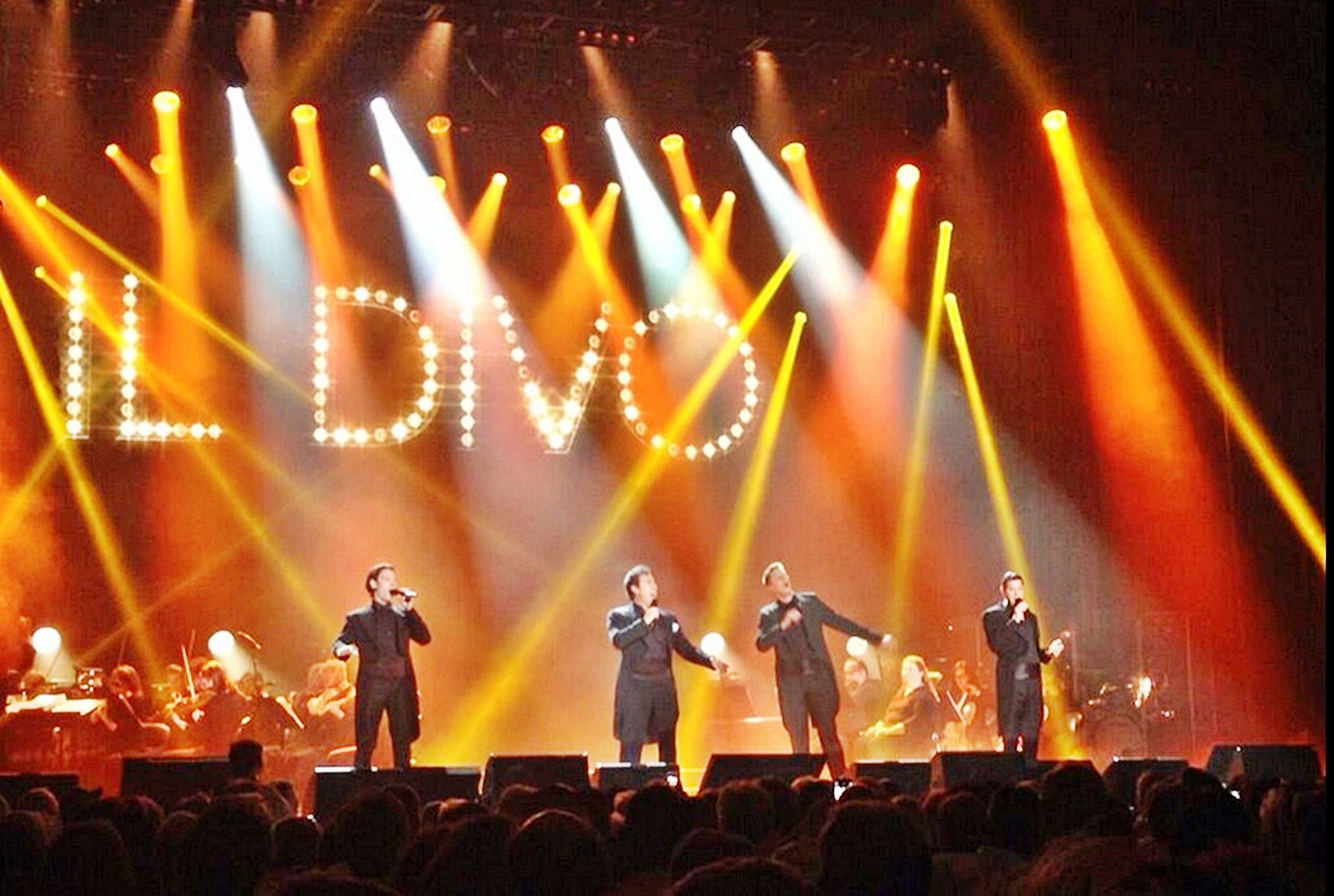
Il Divo performing at Il Divo – A Musical Affair: The Greatest Songs of Broadway

The world tour began in Japan in February 2014 and travelled around the world, ending on 1 November 2014 at the O2 Arena in Greenwich, London. On 19 July 2014, Il Divo sold out Edinburgh Castle, giving a concert featuring "Amazing Grace".

On 24 November 2014, a special edition of A Musical Affair was released, which includes new songs with French singers, partially or fully sung in French. On 1 December 2014, Live in Japan was released, which contains the A Musical Affair tour filmed at the Nippon Budokan Theater in Tokyo on 11 March 2014. The Japanese version includes the songs "Flowers Will Bloom" and "Furusato".

In 2014, on the 10th anniversary of the publication of their first album, the group sold over 28 million albums worldwide, achieving more than 50 number one sales and receiving 160 gold records and platinum in over 33 countries.

On 23 March 2015, it was announced that Il Divo was the winner of the 2015 Silver Clef Award, giving them the Classic PPL Nordoff Robbins Classical Award. The gala award ceremony took place on 3 July at the Grosvenor House Hotel.

=== Amor & Pasión ===
Through Syco Music, on 6 November 2015 in Europa, 27 November in America and 25 October in Japan, Il Divo released Amor & Pasión.

On 21 October, Il Divo performed the first public appearance to promote the sixth album on the program Despierta America, the US network Univision, from Miami, playing his first single "Si voy a perderte (Don't Wanna Lose You)". They then performed the song "Bésame mucho" in Japan. They started the month of November in London, where they attended the second Music Industry Trust Awards.

Amor & Pasión debuted atop the US Latin Albums chart, with 5,000 copies sold in America in the first week, according to Billboard. In Spain, the album debuted at number 10 on the Top 100 Álbumes list.

=== Death of Carlos Marin ===
Carlos Marin was infected with COVID-19 during the Il Divo Christmas Tour in December 2021, dying on 19 December. On January 4th the other three original members announced they were going to continue touring at the end of February 2022 with guest singer Steven Labrie.

=== Notable performances ===
- In 2008, Il Divo performed on the occasion of the Olympic torch hand-over four years prior to the 2012 Summer Olympics.
- On 12 December 2008, Il Divo performed at the Swedish Idol 2008 finale in the Globen Arena in Stockholm.
- 20 January 2009 they performed at the Commander-in-Chief's Ball in Washington, D.C., for US President Barack Obama.
- The Paraguay show was Il Divo's largest-capacity performance to date and took place on 20 December 2011, at the Defensores del Chaco Stadium in Asunción, for 33,900 people.
- On 13 May 2012, the group performed during the Diamond Jubilee of Elizabeth II at Windsor for the entire royal family of the United Kingdom.
- On 19 July 2014, Il Divo performed before a capacity crowd at Edinburgh Castle esplanade where a pop festival took place ahead of the 2014 Commonwealth Games. The group performed "Amazing Grace".
- On 5 July 2015, while recording their eighth album, Il Divo performed at the Astana Concert Hall in Astana, Kazakhstan, in honour of the 17th anniversary of the Day of Capital.

=== Collaborations ===
- In 2009, they performed "Sortilegio de amor" for the soundtrack of the telenovela Sortilegio, which earned them nominations and awards at the Mexico TvyNovelas Awards for Best Musical Theme for "Sortilegio".
- In 2013 they recorded a duet with Engelbert Humperdinck entitled "Spanish Eyes".
- In 2015 Il Divo recorded a duet with Juan Gabriel entitled "Amor Eterno" (Eternal Love).
- In December 2015, the version of "Ode to Joy" sung by Il Divo was chosen to be the main theme of the soundtrack of the 2016 Japanese film Everest.

=== Tours ===
- 2004: Il Divo Tour
- 2006: Streisand: The Tour and Il Divo 2006 World Tour, Ancora
- 2007: Il Divo World Tour
- 2008: Il Divo Global Tour
- 2009: An Evening with Il Divo – World Tour and Celebrate Christmas with Il Divo
- 2011: Il Divo Tour, Wicked Game
- 2012: Il Divo & Orchestra in Concert – World Tour
- 2013: A Musical Affair en el Teatro Marquis de Broadway
- 2014: A Musical Affair Tour and The Best of Il Divo – World Tour
- 2016: Amor & Pasión Tour
- 2017: A Night with the Best of Il Divo
- 2018: Timeless Tour
- 2022: Greatest Hits Tour (ft. Steven Labrie)
- 2023: A New Day Tour (ft. Steven Labrie & introduced by Patrizio Brianne) - Australia (October–November) Sydney, Brisbane, Melbourne, Adelaide

== Artistry ==
=== Styling ===
Besides music, the members of Il Divo are also known for their refined and elegant appearance wearing almost exclusively suits by Giorgio Armani (Giorgio Armani, Emporio Armani and Armani Collezioni) until 2021.

Il Divo is a powerful and fascinating presence, in these years have been a great inspiration for me. I remember the first time I saw them performing live: I was impressed by their elegance and their fascinating way to communicate emotions through his music orig.

— Giorgio Armani

Il Divo's style is so elegant, it describes our music. It's a dress in the style of the Rat Pack which was composed of Frank Sinatra, Dean Martin and Sammy Davis Jr.

— Carlos Marín

=== Musical style ===
Il Divo changed the genre of opera with their musical combination of opera singing and classical music, with themes of different genres, including Latin, folk, ballads, church music, bolero and pop.

=== Multilingual ===
Il Divo records their songs in several languages: Spanish ("Regresa A Mí", "Hasta Mi Final", "La Vida Sin Amor"), English ("Mama", "Amazing Grace", "Don't Cry For Me Argentina"), Italian ("Senza Parole", "Passerà", "Notte Di Luce"), French ("Pour Que Tu M'Aimes Encore", "Le Temps des Cathedrales"), Latin ("Panis Angelicus"), Portuguese ("Volta Pra Mim"), and Japanese ("Furusato"). Some songs incorporate more than one language in the same song, such as "The Man You Love" (Spanish and English), "Ave Maria" (Italian and Latin), and "I Believe In You" (English & French), whereas others are recorded in a single language, but sung live in two languages: "She" (Italian & English) and "Bring Him Home" (English & Spanish).

Most of the songs that they cover are reinterpreted from English and translated into the Spanish language, as the group have said that "Spanish is the language of Romanticism".

== Other activities ==
=== Philanthropy ===
On 25 April 2007, Il Divo performed on American Idol in one of the "Idol Gives Back" episodes, which raised money for children in the US and Africa. For every vote cast during that show, Idol sponsors Coca-Cola, AT&T, and others donated money to the Charity Projects Entertainment Fund and other groups such as Save the Children and America's Second Harvest.

In 2011, they recorded "We Wish You a Merry Christmas" to raise money for the organisation Save the Children.

Il Divo is related indirectly in terms of sponsorship and help with the French NGO SMTA Assistance Médicale Toit du Monde since 2005, of which Izambard is the international official sponsor, and with Sanfilippo Children's Foundation, for which Izambard is the global ambassador.

Between 20 and 30 September 2015, Miller and Bühler participated in a motorbike ride from Miami to Los Angeles to raise funds for the Nordoff Robbins music therapy charity.

== Discography ==
=== Studio albums ===
- Il Divo (2004)
- The Christmas Collection (2005)
- Ancora (2005)
- Siempre (2006)
- The Promise (2008)
- Wicked Game (2011)
- A Musical Affair (2013)
- Amor & Pasión (2015)
- Timeless (2018)
- For Once in My Life: A Celebration of Motown (2021)
- XX (2024)

== Bibliography ==
- Allegra Rossi, Romancing The World, Hardback 128 pages, 10 November 2005, Orion publishers (ISBN 978-0-7528-7519-4)
- Il Divo, Our Music, Our Journey, Our Words, Paperback 192 pages, 6 September 2007, Headline Book Publishing (ISBN 978-0-7553-1657-1)
