= LYRIQ =

LYRIQ or Lyriq may refer to:

- Cadillac LYRIQ, an electric vehicle by General Motors
- Lyriq Bent, a Jamaican-American actor

== See also ==
- Lyric (disambiguation)
