= Early American Roots =

Early American Roots is an album with twenty-two tracks released on compact disc by Hesperus released on April 22, 1997.

Professional ratings
Review scores
Source	Rating
AllMusic	4/5 stars

== Reception ==
AllMusic gave the album a 4/5 from a professional reviewer, and 5/5 from a fan. Rambles.net called it "Fresh. Energetic. Innovative."

== Instrumentation ==
The musical instruments are the recorder, Baroque violin, viola da gamba, flageolet, hammered dulcimer, Baroque guitar, and cittern.

== Track listing ==
Some of the tracks were used "on the soundtrack of Tim Burton's Paramount film, Sleepy Hollow, based on Washington Irving's classic haunted tale."

1. Madison's Whim/The Merry Strollers/The Killerman
2. Bobbing Joe Medley: Bobbing Joe
3. Cuckholds all in a Row/Rufty Tufty/Parson's Farewell
4. Captain Kidd/Nashville
5. A Sett of Hornpipes
6. Butter'd Peas
7. Daphne
8. La Poulle
9. Childgrove
10. Spirit of Gambo
11. Portsmouth/Staines Morris/Lusty Gallant/Chelsea Reach
12. Argeers
13. Daniel Purcell's Ground
14. New Jersey/The Ball
15. John Come Kiss Me Now
16. Rockbridge/The Garden Hymn
17. A Sett of Jiggs
18. Scotch Cap
19. The Merry Milkmaids
20. The President's March/Ça Ira
21. The Swallow/The Colly Flower
22. Johnny Cock thy Beaver
