= Giaches de Wert =

Franco-Flemish composer (1535–1596)

Giaches de Wert (also Jacques/Jaches de Wert, Giaches de Vuert; 1535 – 6 May 1596) was a Franco-Flemish composer of the late Renaissance, active in Italy. Intimately connected with the progressive musical center of Ferrara, he was one of the leaders in developing the style of the late Renaissance madrigal. He was one of the most influential of late sixteenth-century madrigal composers, particularly on Claudio Monteverdi, and his later music was formative on the development of music of the early Baroque era.

== Life ==
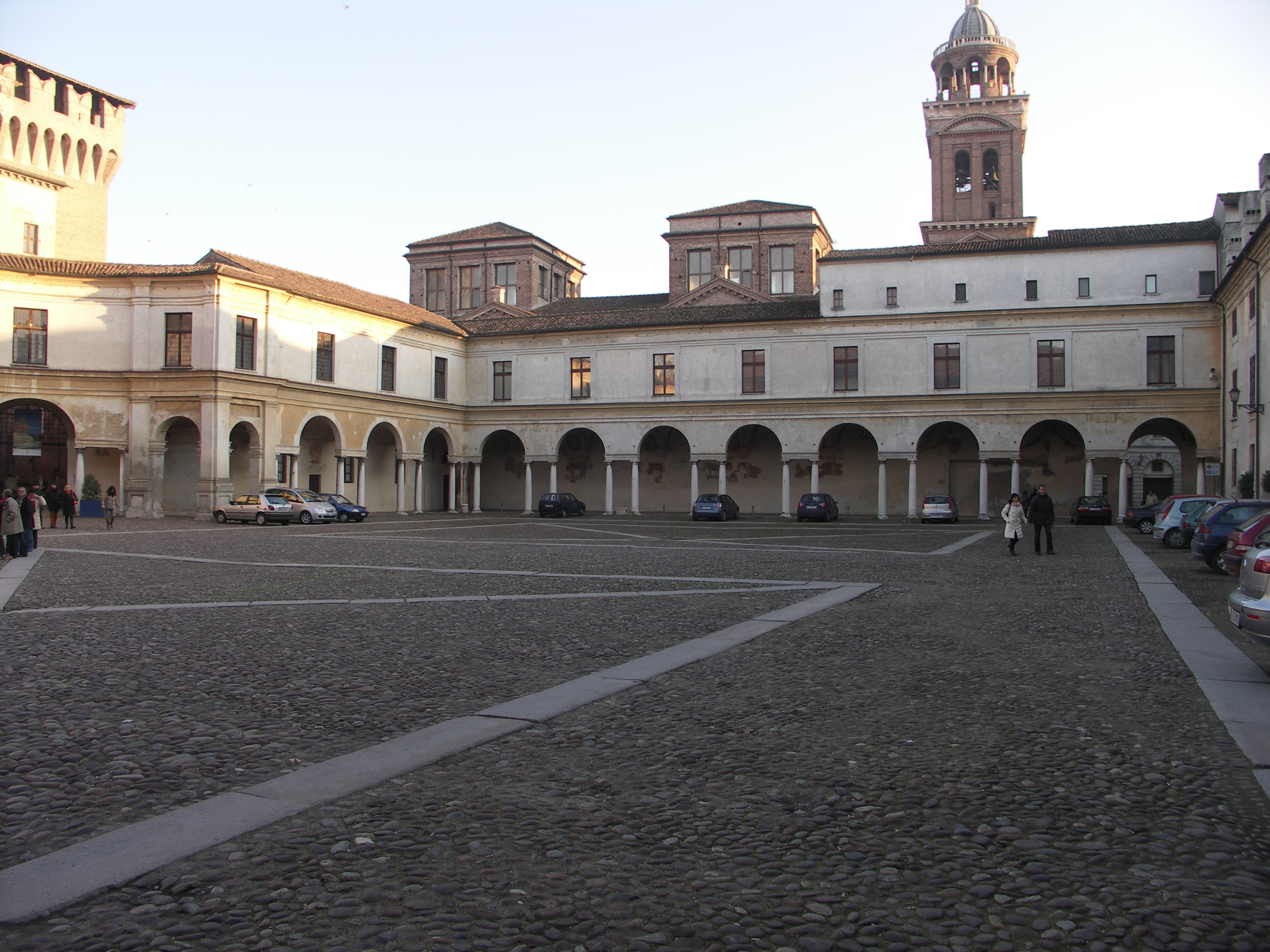
Campanile of Santa Barbara, at the Ducal Palace in Mantua: Wert was choir director here from 1565 until 1592.

Little is known about his early life, except that he was from Flanders, from either the vicinity of Ghent or Weert, near Antwerp. As a boy he went to Avellino in southern Italy, near Naples, where he became a choir boy in the chapel of Maria di Cardona, Marchesa of Padulla. Maria was the wife of Francesco d'Este, Marchese di Massalombarda, a captain under Charles V; Francesco was a son of the notorious Lucrezia Borgia, and her husband Alfonso I d'Este. Francesco was often in France and adjacent areas on military campaigns, and as an adjunct to these adventures he brought musically talented youths back to Italy with him. Wert's association with the Este family was to endure through most of his life.

Sometime before 1550 he began his association with the Gonzaga family. Most likely around 1550 he moved to Novellara, a town in what is now the Province of Reggio Emilia, as a musician in the service of a branch of the Gonzagas; a previous suggestion that he may have been in Rome has not been securely established. Novellara in the mid-sixteenth century was a significant musical center under its local branch of the Gonzaga family. Alfonso I built a theatre and staged dramatic performances at his castle, with his young Flemish choirmaster in charge.

Relations between the Gonzaga and Este families were close, and in the early 1550s Wert traveled at least once to Mantua and Ferrara, centers of musical activity in the late sixteenth century, where he met the renowned madrigalist Cipriano de Rore, who was the most influential figure on his early musical style. While in Novellara, Wert married Lucrezia Gonzaga and raised a family, having at least six children. Wert stayed in Novellara until the early 1560s, at which time he accepted the position of maestro di cappella for the main Gonzaga chapel in Milan; however, he did not stay long there, moving in 1565 to Mantua where he became maestro di cappella at the chapel of Santa Barbara.

It was in Mantua that Lucrezia, Wert's wife, began an affair with Agostino Bonvicino, a Mantuan composer who was Wert's competitor at Santa Barbara. When this affair was discovered in 1570, she was forced to leave Mantua, with Wert remaining behind. Wert persisted in his job, despite the censure of the choir for being a cuckold. However, Lucrezia's subsequent misfortunes exceeded those of Wert. On returning to Novellara, she became sexually involved with Claudio, an illegitimate son of Count Francesco of Novellara, and took part in a plot to murder his uncle on the death of his father as an attempt to gain his inheritance and title; while Claudio escaped justice, Lucrezia was caught with some of the other conspirators, and she died in prison in 1584.

While Wert endured the humiliating situation in Mantua through the late 1560s, he kept his job: he was to remain at least nominally maestro di cappella in Mantua until 1592. The 1560s were productive years for Wert musically, as he produced his first four books of five-voice madrigals during this time, and his first book for four voices. The dedications are significant: one is to Gonzalo Fernández de Córdoba, Duke of Sessa, and in the dedicatory preface Wert thanks him for the opportunity to lead his choir. (Fernández de Córdoba was Governor of Milan from 1558 to 1560.) During the late 1560s Wert had several offers of employment elsewhere, but turned them down. The most significant came in Augsburg in 1566, where Wert's spectacular ability to improvise counterpoint engendered an offer to join the imperial court in Prague, serving Maximilian II, the Holy Roman Emperor. The next job offer he refused came from Parma the next year, the home of the Farnese family. However he became increasingly close to the Este court in Ferrara during the 1570s and 1580s, without actually becoming employed there. While the two courts were closely connected by marriage and mutual interchange of musicians, Ferrara was a place with a profoundly different outlook from Mantua: Ferrara was progressive, while Mantua was supportive of the Counter-Reformation; the progressive tendencies of Ferrara better fitted Wert's musical inclinations. Wert had a good time there; so much so that his employer in Mantua sent a strongly worded letter on 22 December 1584 demanding his immediate return to his post. Wert, however, had fallen in love with the widowed Tarquinia Molza, the most famous female singer and poet in Italy, who was a lady-in-waiting at the Este court, so he endeavored to spend as much time as possible in Ferrara. This was the same year that Lucrezia, Wert's wife, died in prison in Novellara.

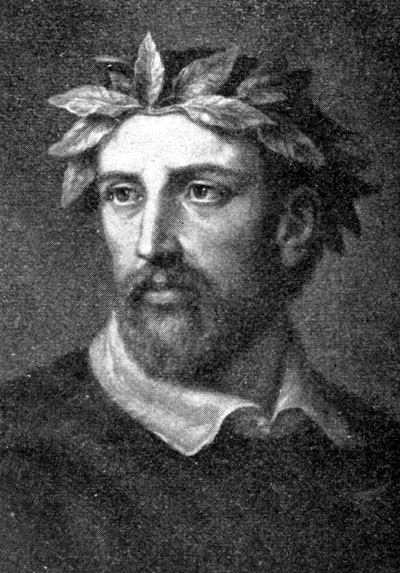
Torquato Tasso, possible friend of Wert at Ferrara, and poet whose verse he often set to music.

Tarquinia, unlike Wert, but like Lucrezia, was a member of the nobility, and when her affair with Wert was found out in 1589 – their affair was plagued with spies, and their love-letters opened – she was banished to Modena. Wert may have been previously married to nobility, but in Ferrara he was still a servant, and his affair was considered as scandalous there as was Lucrezia's in Mantua.

Wert first became ill with malaria in 1582, and ill-health was to bedevil him for the rest of his life. Even so, he remained musically productive, writing a coronation mass for Duke Vincenzo Gonzaga in 1587, and numerous madrigals for the concerto delle donne, the renowned group of musical ladies of Ferrara, who were virtuoso singers. In 1592, Giovanni Giacomo Gastoldi took over his post as maestro di cappella in Mantua, and in August 1595 he dedicated his last book of madrigals. Wert died in 1596 in Mantua, in his house near the ducal palace; his tomb is near to that of his contemporary Francesco Rovigo, in the crypt of Santa Barbara, beneath the church where he worked for many years.

== Music and influence ==
=== Secular ===
While Wert wrote both sacred and secular music, as well as a handful of instrumental fantasias, his madrigals were by far the most famous portion of his output during his lifetime. He wrote approximately 230, which he published in sixteen separate books spread across a half-century, from 1558 to the final posthumous collection in 1608. His madrigal books are almost all for five voices, although he published one book in 1561 for four, and the posthumous collection of 1608 includes pieces ranging from four to seven voices.

Wert's early style was heavily influenced by Cipriano de Rore, the renowned mid-century madrigalist active at Ferrara. Wert's first three books show some features typical of Rore's writing, such as chromaticism, word-painting, and, according to Alfred Einstein, an "indifference to everything merely formal and ... [a] striving for the most intense expression." In the manner of Adrian Willaert's madrigals, he also explored distant tonal regions, while avoiding jarring harmonic progressions. In addition, he showed a preference for a declamatory, homophonic style, which he refined later in his career into a seconda prattica manner influential on Monteverdi, and he also showed a liking for high voices – something which turned out to be a defining characteristic of the music-making at the Este court in Ferrara. The poems he chose to set for his early books include examples by Pietro Bembo, Petrarch and Ariosto.

Wert's style at mid-career began to change away from the Rore manner towards one more closely aligned with the Venetians, such as Andrea Gabrieli. Pure homophony became more common in his works, and he began to exploit registral and textural contrasts rather than switch from polyphony to homophony; in addition, his lines became more lyrical. His preferred poets changed as well: while early in his career he had used Bembo and Petrarch, and later Ariosto, he shifted to Guarini and Torquato Tasso. In his sixth book of madrigals for five voices (1577), he included three madrigal cycles, an innovation which was to become a prominent musical subgenre near the end of the century. The cycles include two canzoni by Petrarch and a capitolo by Ariosto; they are set in a declamatory manner, thereby including a treatment of vocal lines which foreshadowed monody, and Wert's own later works.

Once Wert made the acquaintance of the virtuoso singing ladies of Ferrara, the concerto delle dame, he began to write madrigals for them in an appropriate style – with elaborate parts for three high voices, often containing separate blocks for high and low voices, and the most virtuosic singing required in the topmost part. His music during this period was influenced by the other composers working in Ferrara, including Luzzasco Luzzaschi, and his favorite poets of the time were those most closely associated with Ferrara – Tasso and Guarini. In his tenth book of madrigals (1591), six of the compositions may have been intended for a solo singer with instrumental accompaniment, in the manner of the monodies which were one of the forerunners of opera. The late music is tonal, anticipating the changes in musical language of the early Baroque, during which functional tonality crystallized out of the pre-tonal universe of the late Renaissance; in addition these late compositions are mainly homophonic, with only occasional polyphonic passages appearing as an animating contrast. An influence from the Venetians is his occasional use of the stile concertato, with groups of voices in dialogue.

For his final madrigal book published in his lifetime, the eleventh, he set passages from Guarini's Il pastor fido, one of the most popular texts for musical setting of the era. The final collection published under Wert's name came out posthumously in 1608, and contained pieces for four to seven voices. One of its madrigals was a setting of Guarini's notorious Tirsi morir volea, an obscene poem that Einstein called "worthless, indeed contemptible", and "...more obscene than the coarsest mascherata, the most suggestive canto carnascialesco, or the most impertinent chanson ... could not be more removed from true poetry" but yet which was the most-often set individual poem of the late sixteenth century. It portrayed a nymph and a shepherd attempting, by speeding up and slowing down, to achieve simultaneous orgasm, with multiple double entendres on "death" and "dying"; the popularity of this poem was enormous. Wert wrote his setting in 1581.

=== Sacred ===
Wert wrote a considerable amount of sacred music, but little of it was published during his lifetime. He published only three books of motets, one in 1566 and the other two in 1581; a few of his works, such as the Missa Dominicalis appeared in anthologies with the music of other composers. His other six masses remained in manuscript, as did the majority of the music he wrote for Santa Barbara in Mantua. Most likely this was because he was commissioned to write that music, such as his cycle of 127 hymns, specifically for that institution, and his publisher was in Venice.

The style of his sacred music varies from simple homophony, designed for absolute clarity of textual expression in conformance with the dictates of the Council of Trent (as Mantua was a center of the Counter-Reformation, this was to be expected), to motet settings similar in expressive intensity to his madrigals including passages of surprising chromaticism not unlike that of Gesualdo. This is particularly true in the 1581 collections: Ascendente Jesu, for example, contains colorful examples of text-painting such as he used in the works he was composing for the Ferrarese court at the time.

All of Wert's works, both sacred and secular, have been compiled and edited by Carol MacClintock and M. Bernstein in CMM series xxiv.

== Works ==
=== Secular music: madrigals, canzonette ===
- Il primo libro de madrigali (Venice, 1558; five voices)
- Il primo libro de madrigali (Venice 1561; four voices)
- Madrigale del fiore, libro primo (Venice 1561; five voices)
- Madrigale del fiore, libro secondo (Venice 1561; five voices)
- Il terzo libro de madrigali (Venice 1563; five voices)
- Il secondo libro de madrigali (Venice 1564; five voices) (Note that the third book was published before the second)
- Il quarto libro de madrigali (Venice 1567; five voices)
- Il quinto libro de madrigali (Venice 1571; five voices)
- Il sesto libro de madrigali (Venice 1577; five voices)
- Il settimo libro de madrigali (Venice 1581; five voices)
- L'ottavo libro de madrigali (Venice 1586; five voices)
- Il nono libro de madrigali (Venice 1588; five voices)
- Il primo libro delle canzonette villanelle (Venice 1589; five voices)
- Il decimo libro de madrigali (Venice 1591; five voices)
- L'undecimo libro de madrigali (Venice 1595; five voices)
- Il duodecimo libro de madrigali (Venice 1608; four to seven voices; posthumous)
- Numerous works published separately or in anthologies, between 1558 and 1590.

=== Sacred music ===
Most remained in manuscript. However, the following were published:

- Motectorum liber primus (Venice 1566; five voices)
- Il secondo libro de motetti (Venice 1581; five voices)
- Modulationum liber primus (Venice 1581; six voices)
- Numerous other works published separately or in anthologies, between 1563 and 1609.

== Recordings ==
- Heavenly Spheres, CBC Records, MVCD 1121, sung by Studio de musique ancienne de Montréal. Contains two six-voice motets by Wert, Ascendente Jesu in naviculam and Peccavi super numerum.
- "Vox in Rama", Signum, sung by Collegium Regale, the choral scholars of King's College, Cambridge, under Stephen Cleobury. Contains the entire second book of motets.
- O mors, quam amara est – Brilliant Classics 94684 (2014). First book of motets, sung by Collegium Musicum Amsterdam, under Anthony Zielhorst.
- Madrigali a cinque voci – Harmonia Mundi HMC901621 (1997). Selection from various books of madrigals, sung by Cantus Cölln, under Konrad Junghänel (lute).
