= Heavenly Spheres =

Studio album by Studio de musique ancienne de Montréal
- Recorded: 1998
- Genre: A cappella choral

Heavenly Spheres (L'Harmonie des Sphères) is an a cappella choral album by the Studio de musique ancienne de Montréal under the direction of Christopher Jackson. Recorded in 1998, it features songs from the late 15th to early 16th century. It was awarded a Félix Award from the ADISQ and was nominated for the Juno Award for Classical Album of the Year – Vocal or Choral Performance in 2000.

The album includes performances of compositions by Nicolas Gombert, Roland de Lassus, Giovanni Pierluigi da Palestrina, Josquin des Prez, and others.

== Track listing ==
1. Musae Jovis, the lament on the death of Josquin des Prez, for 6 voices by Nicolas Gombert
2. Inviolata, integra et casta es, motet for 5 voices by Josquin des Prez
3. Motet Tulerunt Dominum meum for 8 voices by Nicolas Gombert
4. Nesciens Mater Virgo Virum, for 8 voices by Jean Mouton
5. Andreas Christi famulus for 8 voices, motet by Cristóbal de Morales
6. Salve Regina, motet for 4 voices (from Motets Book II) by Giovanni Pierluigi da Palestrina
7. Beatus Laurentius, motet for 5 voices by Giovanni Pierluigi da Palestrina
8. Omnes de Saba venient, motet for 8 voices, M. xix (S. xxi/1) by Orlande de Lassus
9. Litaniae de beata virgine Maria, litany for 6 voices by Giovanni Pierluigi da Palestrina
10. Vidi speciosam, motet for 6 voices by Tomás Luis de Victoria
11. Ascendente Jesu in Naviculam, for 6 voices, W xvi, 23 by Giaches de Wert
12. Peccavi super numerum by Giaches de Wert
