= Lyrics (disambiguation) =

Lyrics are words that make up a song.

Lyrics may also refer to:

- Lyrics (Donell Jones album), 2010
- Lyrics (Miho Komatsu album), 2003
- The Lyrics: 1956 to the Present, a 2001 book by Paul McCartney
- Lyrics, a series of books by Bob Dylan
- Lyrics Born, Tsutomu Shimura (born 1972), Japanese-American rapper

== See also ==
- Lyric poetry
- Lyric (disambiguation)
