= Lyric Theatre (Swift Current) =

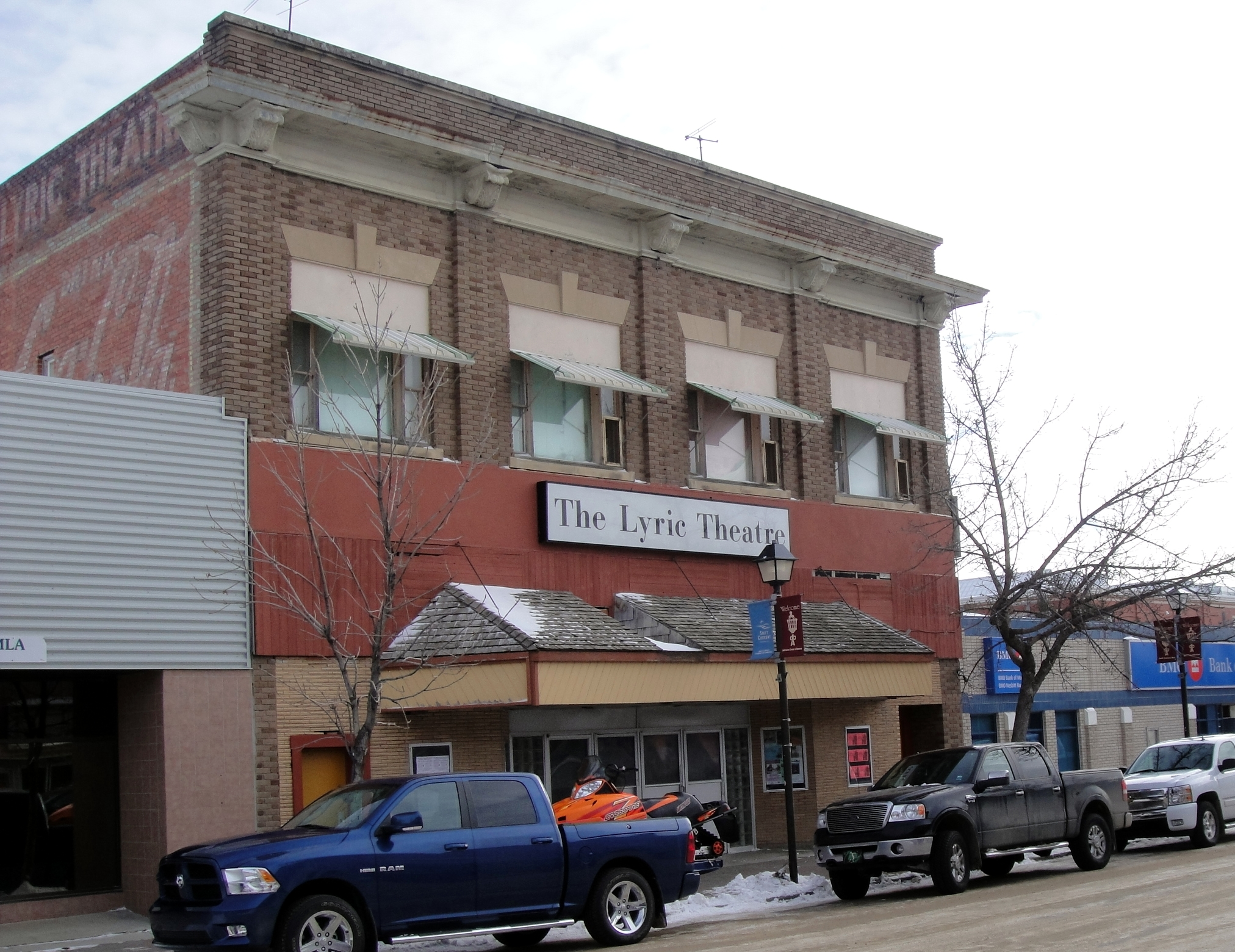
- Interactive map of Lyric Theatre
- Address: 227 Central Avenue North
- Location: Swift Current, Saskatchewan, Canada
- Owner: Southwest Cultural Development Group
- Type: Performing arts centre

Construction
- Built: 1912

Website
- www.lyrictheatre.ca

The Lyric Theatre is a performing arts theatre located in Swift Current, Saskatchewan, Canada. The building was declared a municipal heritage property in 2007. The theatre was originally built as a Vaudeville and silent film theatre with 400 seats. It operated as a movie house until 1980, when it was converted into a night club. In 2005, it was purchased by a community group (Southwest Cultural Development Group) and became a performing arts cultural centre.

A two-story brick construction, the building originally had the theatre on the main floor, apartments on the upper floors (primarily used by employees of the theatre), with the basement housing a pool hall and bowling alley.
