= Lyric Theater (Oxford, Mississippi) =

The Lyric Oxford
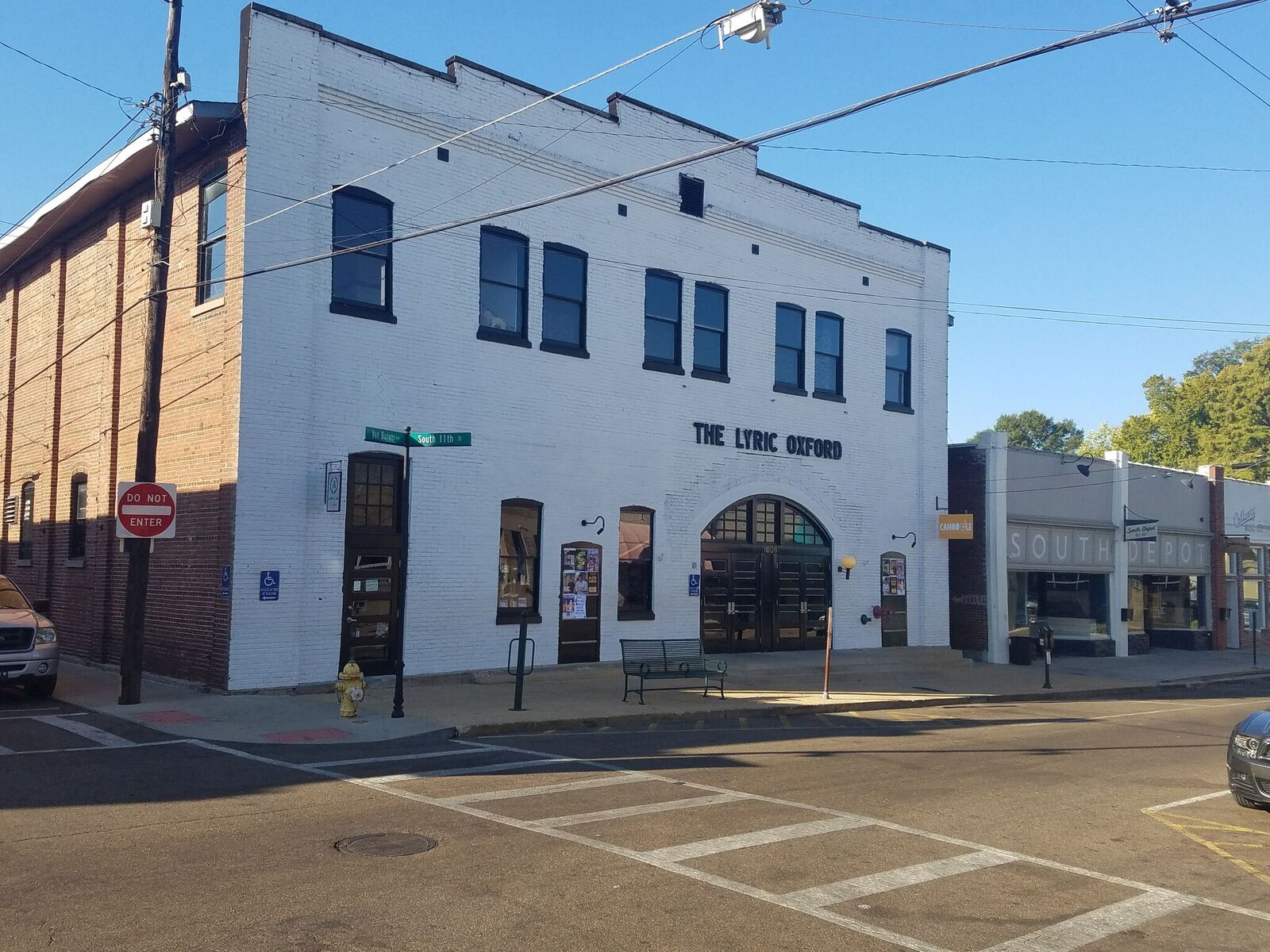
- The Lyric in Oxford, MS.
- Interactive map of The Lyric Oxford
- Address: 1006 Van Buren Ave
- Location: Oxford, MS 38655
- Coordinates: 34.36596°N 89.5201°W
- Seating type: Reserved seating
- Type: Concert Hall

Construction
- Reopened: July 3rd, 2008

Website
- thelyricoxford.com

The Lyric is a historical theater located in Oxford, Mississippi at 1006 Van Buren Avenue that hosts a wide variety of acts.

== History ==
The Lyric was originally a livery stable owned by William Faulkner's family in the early part of the 20th century. The stable was originally used to hold the horses that pulled the buggies around Oxford's town square. It was later converted into a theater for silent films and live performances during the 1920s when it was named the Lyric Theater. During this time, the theater was owned and operated by Robert X. Williams, Jr., who was the son of the mayor and cousin-in-law of William Faulkner. The invention of motion pictures turned the Lyric into Oxford's first movie theater. In 1949, William Faulkner walked from his home (Rowan Oak) to the Lyric to attend the world premiere of MGM's "Intruder in the Dust" at his former childhood stable. In the 1970s, the Lyric stopped operating as a movie theater and was abandoned for many years until the 1980s, when it was restored and turned into a health center and office spaces. In 2007, the building went through major renovations and once again returned to a theater. On July 3, 2008, the theater began operating again. The Lyric is currently managed by Lindsay Dillon-Maginnis.

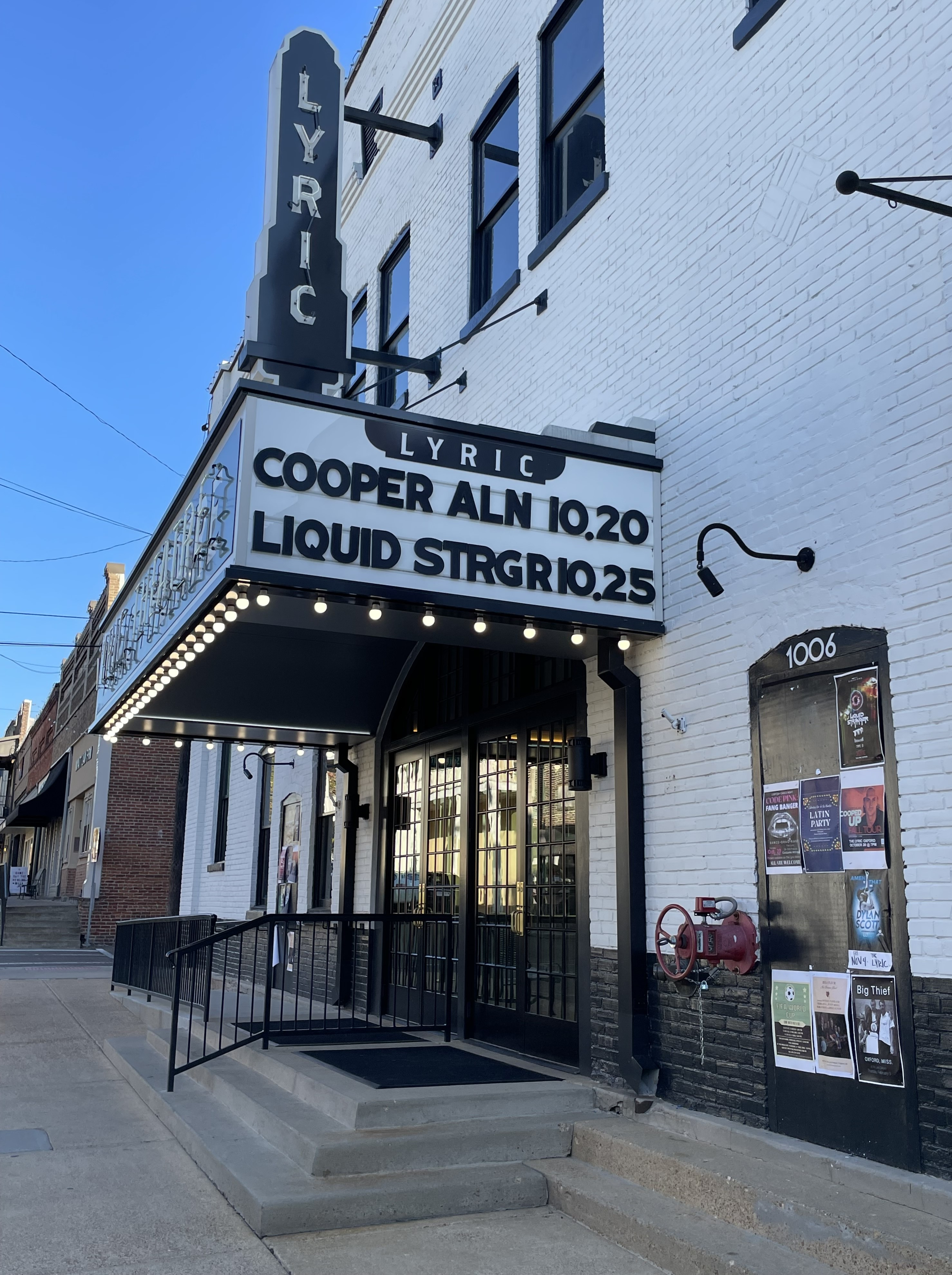
Right view, 2022

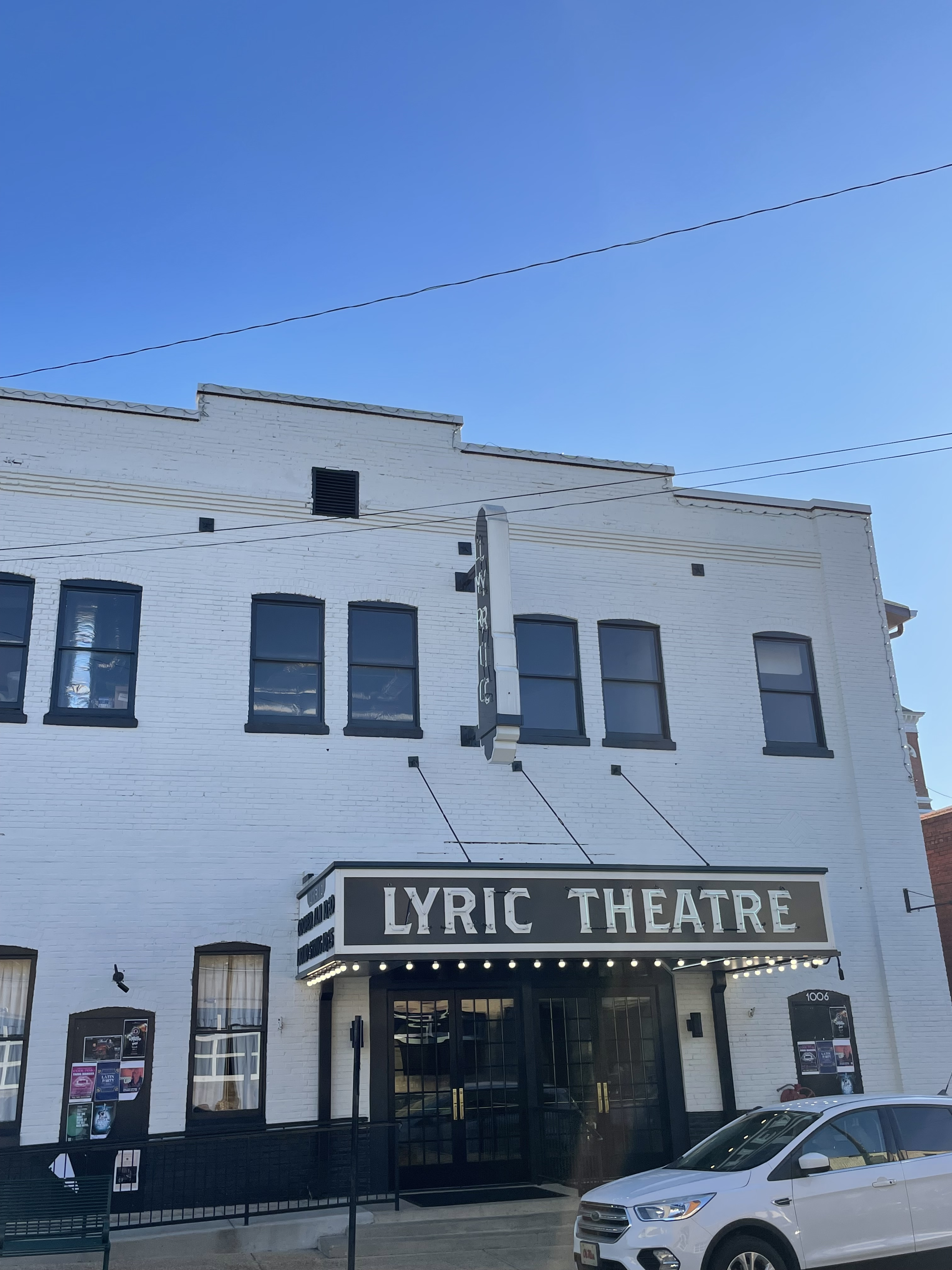
Front view, 2022

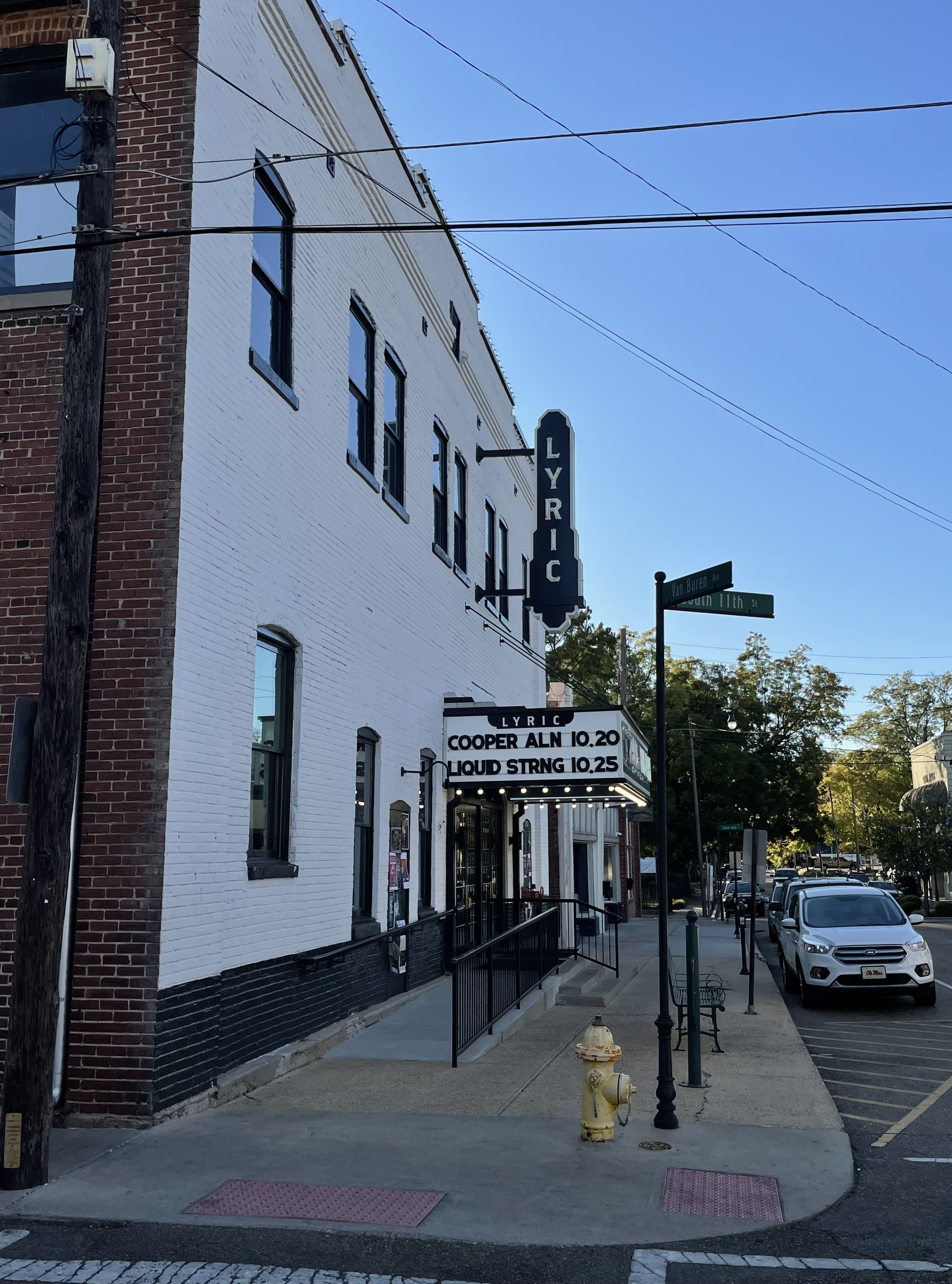
Left view, 2022
