= William Simmes =

English composer and musician

William Simmes (c. 1575 – c. 1625) was an English Renaissance composer and musician who was in service to the Earl of Dorset in 1608.

== Recordings ==
- Renaissance Brass Music - Eastman Brass Quintet, Paris Instrumental Ensemble, Florian Hollard. Philip Collins, Daniel Patrylak, Verne Reynolds, Donald Knaub, Cherry Beauregard. ADD CD, Vox Allegretto ACD 8154, 1993, 76 mins.
- Rise, O My Soul - Les Voix Humaines, Christopher Jackson. DDD CD, ATMA Classique, ASIN: B000OYAYH6, June 2007.
