= Lyric Opera of Virginia =

Lyric Opera of Virginia is an opera company based in the Commonwealth of Virginia. Its leader is Peter Mark, who was the Artistic Director of the Virginia Opera for 36 years. Although Mark's contract with Virginia Opera was set to expire at the end of May 2012, the Virginia Opera's executive committee terminated Mark on November 18, 2010. In 2003, Virginia Opera's board assigned Mark's administrative leadership duties to Paul A. "Gus" Stuhlreyer, leaving Mark with the titles of music director, artistic director and principal conductor. On January 9, 2011, Mark, Edythe Harrison, and others announced the formation of a competing opera organization to be called "Lyric Opera of Virginia."

Its first season in 2011-12 Lyric Opera of Virginia presented Verdi's La Traviata, Rogers and Hammerstein's The King and I, and an abridged production of Carmen at the Sandler Center for the Performing Arts in Virginia Beach, the Center for the Performing Arts at Christopher Newport University in Newport News, the Landmark and Carpenter Theatres in Richmond, and a venue in Northern Virginia. The first season's budget was $2.5 million. In 2013 the company staged Giuseppe Verdi's Falstaff in honor of the 200th anniversary of the composer's birth.
