= Lyric Opera Baltimore =

US musical group

Lyric Opera Baltimore was an American opera company based in Baltimore, Maryland. The group performed its inaugural season in 2011, bringing opera back to the Lyric Opera House on Mount Royal Avenue after the unfortunate 2009 bankruptcy filing at the beginnings of the recent Great Recession of 2008-2009 of the now-defunct longtime Baltimore Opera Company. That company had become known for its espousal of American singers and its commitment to education and outreach since its beginnings as the Baltimore Civic Opera Company in the 1920s and under the later sponsorship of the nationally renowned diva and Baltimorean, the late Rosa Ponselle.

Lyric Opera Baltimore performed in Baltimore's historic Lyric Opera House of 1894 in the Mount Vernon-Belvedere-Mount Royal neighborhood north of downtown, also the former home of the old BOC along with the Baltimore Symphony Orchestra, and Maryland Ballet Company, now renovated again, renamed and called the Modell Performing Arts Center at the Lyric, in honor of Art Modell (1925-2012), and his wife's bequest to the city's arts and culture scene by the late longtime owner of the Baltimore Ravens professional football franchise. James Harp, formerly the Artistic Administrator of the former Baltimore Opera Company and Cantor/Organist-Music Director at St. Mark's Evangelical Lutheran Church at Saint Paul and 20th Streets, was named the new Artistic Director of Lyric Opera Baltimore.

Another company, Baltimore Opera Theatre, had already resurrected opera in the city shortly after the bankruptcy of the BOC, albeit at a venue closer to the city's central business district, but this company is no longer producing operas. A number of smaller companies have also produced operas in Baltimore, on various scales.

The first season (2011–2012) consisted of La traviata (with Elizabeth Futral and Eric Margiore), Le nozze di Figaro (directed by Bernard Uzan), and Faust (starring Stefania Dovhan and Bryan Hymel). In partnership with the city's historic and premier Peabody Institute (music conservatory), Stravinsky's The Rake's Progress was also staged.

It was announced in early 2012 that Lyric Opera Baltimore would plan to stage three operas in its second season, including one in partnership with the nearby Peabody Institute, founded 1857, facing the landmark Washington Monument, which is now part of The Johns Hopkins University.

The 2012–2013 season featured La bohème (with Anna Samuil and Georgy Vasiliev), Don Giovanni (in conjunction with the Peabody Institute), and Rigoletto (starring Stephen Powell and Bryan Hymel). A "Bravissimo Bel Canto" concert was presented in April 2013 which featured noted soloists including Alek Shrader and Daniela Mack.

In addition to the Peabody team-up, the newer version of the opera company became more partnership-oriented in the pit as well. While the old Baltimore Opera Company had always played with its own ensemble, some performances of Lyric Opera Baltimore featured the Baltimore Symphony Orchestra (founded 1916) in the pit. (Other performances used the Concert Artists of Baltimore orchestra, many members of which had previous BOC pit experience.)

The 2013–2014 season consisted of Tosca (starring Jill Gardner and Raymond Aceto, with stage direction by Artistic Director James Harp), The Dialogues of the Carmelites (in conjunction with the Peabody Institute), an evening of French Grand Opera (starring Nicole Cabell and Stephen Costello), and Nabucco (with Michael Chioldi and Francesca Mondanaro).

One grand opera was produced in the 2014–2015 season as part of the Lyric Opera House's 120th anniversary season. "Madama Butterfly" was presented in November with Asako Tamura, Chad Shelton, Mika Shegamatsu, and Timothy Mix. The Baltimore Symphony Orchestra was conducted by Steven White, and James Harp was Stage Director. The Peabody Opera was produced in March and was "The Abduction from the Seraglio".

The 2015–2016 season included a musical preview in October, a Peabody production of "Street Scene" in November, "Il Barbiere di Siviglia in March and Romeo et Juliette in May.

Lyric Opera Baltimore ceased operation in 2017.

As of 2019, James Harp leads a new organization, Maryland Opera.
