= Giovanni Giacomo Gastoldi =

Italian composer (1554–1609)

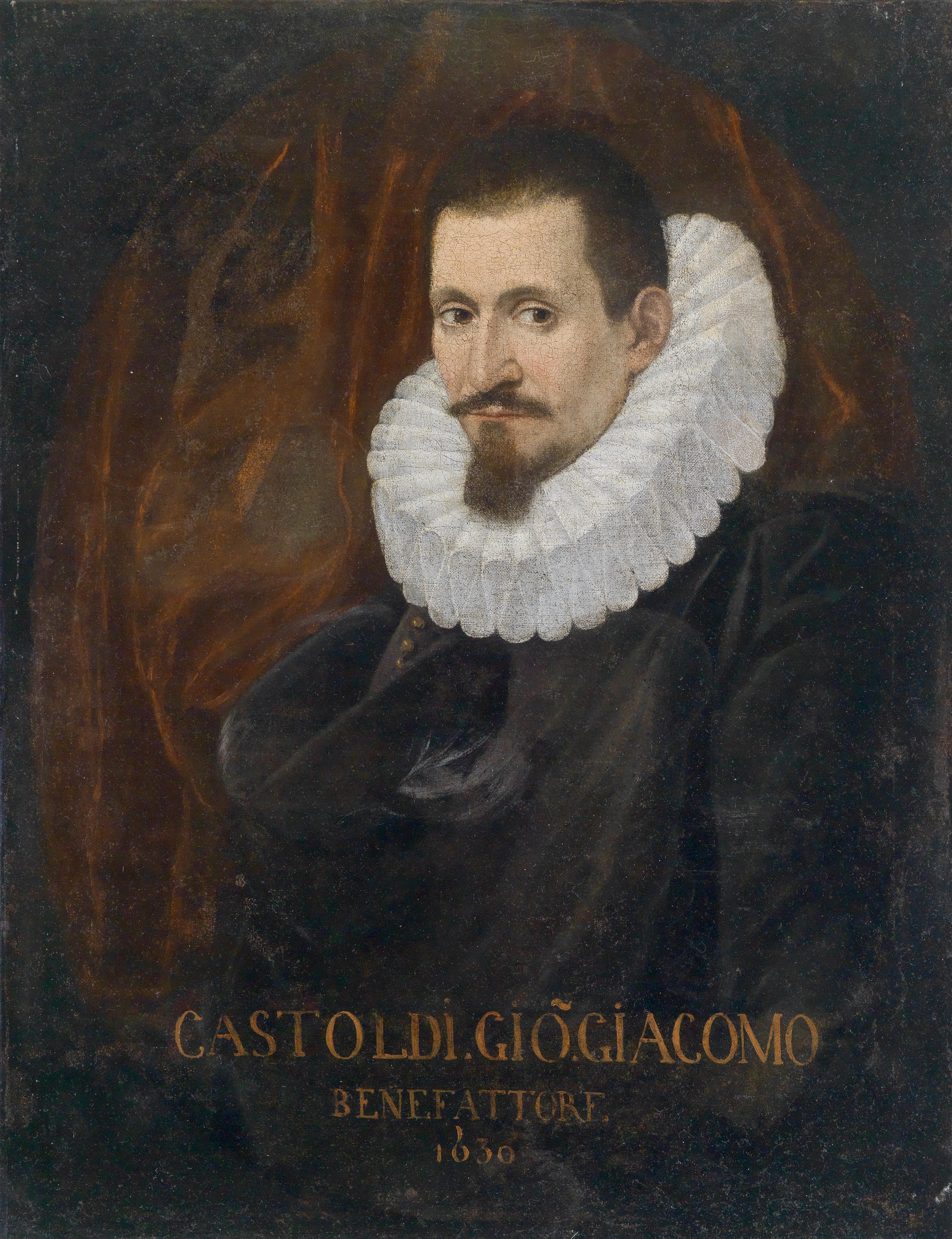
Giovanni Giacomo Gastoldi (Northern Italian School of the early 17th century)

Giovanni Giacomo Gastoldi (c. 1554 – 4 January 1609) was an Italian composer of the late Renaissance and early Baroque periods. He is known for his 1591 publication of balletti for five voices.

== Career ==
Gastoldi was born at Caravaggio, Lombardy. In 1592, he succeeded Giaches de Wert as choirmaster at Santa Barbara's, Mantua, and served until 1605 under the Dukes Guglielmo and Vincenzo Gonzaga. According to Filippo Lomazzo, Gastoldi became choirmaster at the Duomo, Milan, afterwards, but other considerations seem to make this point doubtful.

== Works ==
Gastoldi composed several books of madrigals, a variety of sacred vocal music, and a few instrumental works. Particularly noteworthy among his secular vocal works is his Quarto libro de' madrigali a cinque voci (1602), which consists almost entirely of settings of texts from Battista Guarini's hugely popular "pastoral tragicomedy" Il pastor fido (The Faithful Shepherd). According to Gastoldi himself, at least one of the pieces from this collection was included in a Mantuan court performance of the play in November 1598, which was staged as part of the festivities accompanying a visit of the queen of Spain.

=== Balletti ===
His two sets of balletti, a strophic vocal dance, however, are the most prominent and influential. These were written for five voices, and contained passages of nonsense syllables (e.g. "fa la la") which seemed to personify a type of lover and love-making. As a whole, Gastoldi's balletti were a musical commedia dell'arte, and included the following compositions: Contento (The Lucky One), Premiato (The Winner), L'Inamorato (The Suitor), Piacere (Pleasure), La Bellezza (Beauty), Gloria d'Amore (Praise of Love), L'Acceso (The Ardent), Caccia d'Amore (Love-Chase), Il Martellato (The Disdained), Il Bell’humore (The Good Fellow), Amor Vittorioso (Love Victorious), and Speme Amorosa (Amorous Hope). His balleti music basically had a simple chordal texture, fast declamation and rhythmic accents at the expense of contrapuntal display, as is to be expected from their close relationship to dance music.

Gastoldi's Balleti a Cinque Voci was published in Venice in 1591, and immediately became a "best seller." Within a short time, the collection was reprinted ten times, not only by their original publisher but also in other countries as well. Composers like Vecchi, Banchieri, Hassler, and Morley were greatly captivated by this musical creation (compare Morley's ballett Now is the Month of Maying for a clear example of Gastoldi's influence).

It is certain that many frottole, villancicos, and chansons francaises were intimately related to dance, but it seems true that Gastoldi was the first scholarly author, presumably since the thirteenth century, to compose songs for dancing which were modeled on instrumental patterns, and were perfectly apt for instrumental performance alone.

The title page of the balletti bestows the title "Maestro di Cappella del Serenissimo Signor Duca di Mantova" to Gastoldi. However, this has no slightest intention of masking sophistication behind the spontaneous naivete of Gastoldi's works, because the entire content is a collection of simplicity, healthy playfulness, communicative carefreeness, and gaiety. The common trait is, of course, the Fa-la refrain, (which incidentally became "lirum-lirum "in Gloria d’amore) with skipping rhythms, clear lines, and frank tonality. Gastoldi sought to vary his compositions from ballet to ballet by sometimes writing in triple time, in double or by the alternate use of major and minor. Otherwise, it cannot be said that he at all attempted a psychological differentiation between the several "characters" depicted.

=== Works in translation ===
Gastoldi's Italian works were enormously popular in the Netherlands in Dutch contrafacta.
