= Baltimore Opera Company =

Former American opera company in Baltimore

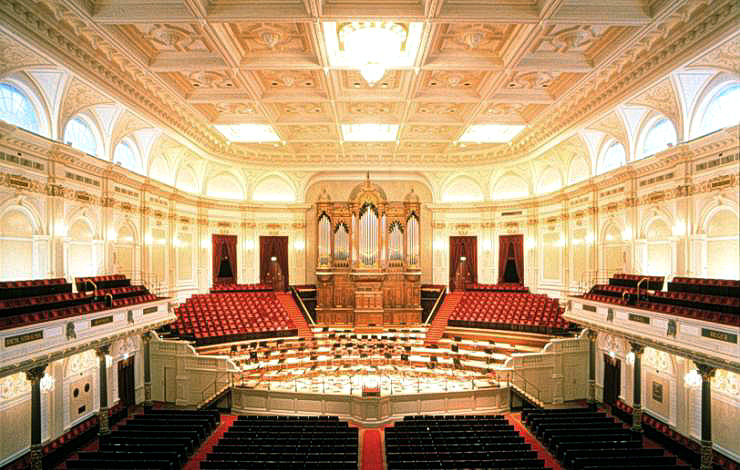
The Grote Zaal (Great Hall) of the Concertgebouw after which the Baltimore Lyric Opera House was modeled.

The Baltimore Opera Company (BOC) was an opera company in Baltimore, Maryland, United States, based at the Baltimore Lyric Opera House.

On March 12, 2009, the 58-year-old opera company announced plans to pursue Chapter 7 bankruptcy liquidation, the result of the company having filed a petition on December 10, 2008, under Chapter 11 of the U.S. Bankruptcy Code with the United States Bankruptcy Court for the District of Maryland.

Amongst the reasons cited were "dwindling ticket sales and contributions". Productions of Gioachino Rossini's Il Barbiere di Siviglia and George Gershwin's Porgy and Bess, scheduled respectively for March and May 2009, were canceled, and ticket-holders did not receive refunds.

The former home of the now defunct BOC, the Lyric Opera House, is a music venue modeled after the Concertgebouw, Amsterdam, building inaugurated on October 31, 1894, with a performance by the Boston Symphony Orchestra and Australian opera singer Nellie Melba as the featured soloist. Not long after, Enrico Caruso appeared there with the Metropolitan Opera in a performance of Flotow's Martha. One former opera singer for the Baltimore Opera is Mike Rowe, most well known as the television host of Dirty Jobs on The Discovery Channel.

== History ==
In 1950, building on earlier amateur efforts, Baltimore Opera was formally established as the Baltimore Civic Opera Company, with the famous American soprano Rosa Ponselle as its first artistic director. She brought Beverly Sills to Baltimore for a production of Manon in 1952.

By embarking upon a program of modernization in 1960 the company attracted private funding to be able to hire professional set designers and diversify its repertoire.

In 1963, the Ford Foundation made a generous contribution that allowed the company to stabilize a format of three operas a season and to hire a full-time Production Manager. In subsequent years, it staged notable productions of such operas as Der Rosenkavalier, in 1962, with conductor Kurt Adler; Rigoletto, in 1964, with Sherrill Milnes, who also appeared as Escamillo in Carmen that year; Lucia di Lammermoor, in 1965, with Anna Moffo; Don Giovanni, in 1966, with Sills and Norman Treigle; Madama Butterfly, also in 1966, with Licia Albanese; Turandot, also in 1966, with Birgit Nilsson and Teresa Stratas; The Tales of Hoffmann in 1967 with Sills, Plácido Domingo, and Treigle; and Boris Godunov, also in 1967, with Treigle.

The name Baltimore Civic Opera Company was changed to Baltimore Opera Company in 1970 since the word "civic" denoted amateurism, a term deemed no longer applicable to the company's offerings.

For the occasion of the American Bicentennial in 1976, the Company appropriately commissioned its first work, opera Inês de Castro, composed by Thomas Pasatieri with a libretto by Bernard Stambler. This work was a major American operatic event and featured a cast that included Richard Stilwell, James Morris, and Lili Chookasian, with staging by Tito Capobianco.

In 1993, Baltimore Opera inaugurated its Summer Aria Series, dedicated to works by American composers and, in the following year, a sizable grant was awarded to the BOC by the National Arts Stabilization Fund in order to give the company complete financial stability. The 1994/1995 season saw additional subscription performance offered for each opera.

Formerly, the company mounted four productions a year, one example being the 2007/2008 season which consisted of Verdi's La forza del destino, Donizetti's Maria Stuarda, Gounod's Roméo et Juliette, and Puccini's Madama Butterfly.

After the BOC collapse in 2009, several companies emerged in an attempt to continue making opera performances available to Baltimore. Baltimore Concert Opera, founded by baritone Brenden Cooke, mounted a concert performance of Don Giovanni using volunteer singers after the BOC filed for Chapter 7 bankruptcy, expecting the BOC to reorganize and re-emerge. When that did not come to pass, Baltimore Concert Opera incorporated and started to regularly perform concert operas in the ballroom of Baltimore's Garrett-Jacobs Mansion with professional musicians. The Baltimore Concert Opera rebranded as Opera Baltimore in 2022 after mounting a fully-staged Barber of Seville and has continued to produce both concert operas and fully-staged opera performances.

Several staff members and trustees of the BOC attempted to revive the company and re-incorporated as Lyric Opera Baltimore. This company mounted productions at the BOC's old venue, the Lyric Opera House from 2011 until 2017 before it also failed. Lyric Opera Baltimore then re-organized as Maryland Opera, which now performs operatic arias and scenes in various local churches.
