= Hesperus (ensemble) =

Hesperus is an early music and traditional music ensemble. It was founded by Scott Reiss and Tina Chancey in 1979 to play early European music, American traditional music and crossover fusions of the two, as well as British and Spanish Colonial music. It currently specializes in early music scores to 1920s silent films such as The Mark of Zorro (Spanish Colonial music), Robin Hood (English renaissance music), The Hunchback of Notre Dame (French medieval music), The Golem (Sephardic and Ashkenazi Jewish music), Nosferatu (German medieval and renaissance music), The General (music from the American Civil War) and The Three Musketeers (French renaissance and traditional music.

== History ==
From 1989 to 1996, Hesperus was a resident ensemble at the National Museum of American History. Music from their album Early American Roots are part of the sound track for the 1999 film Sleepy Hollow. In concert tours sponsored by the United States Information Agency, Hesperus performed in Brunei, Indonesia, Taiwan, Hong Kong, Singapore and Panama, as well as touring to Bolivia, Germany and Italy.

== Discography ==
- Crossing Over (1988)
- Neo-Medieval (1997)
- Unicorn (1997)
- Early American Roots (1997)
- Luminous Spirit: Chants of Hildegard von Bingen (1998)
- I Love Lucette (1998)
- Celtic Roots (1999)
- Spain in the New World (1999)
- Baroque Recorder Concerit (1999)
- Patchwork (2000)
- Dancing Day (2000)
- The Food of Love (2001)
- My Thing is My Own (2001)
- Colonial America (2003)
- An Early American Quilt (2007)
