= Studio de musique ancienne de Montréal =

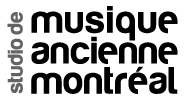

Background information
- Origin: Canada
- Genres: Early music
- Years active: 1974–present
- Labels: ATMA
- Website: smamontreal.ca/en/

The Studio de musique ancienne de Montréal is a professional early music vocal ensemble based in Montreal, Quebec, Canada.

== History ==
The group was co-founded in 1974 by the organ and harpsichord players Christopher Jackson, Réjean Poirier and Hélène Dugal, and became an important part of the early music revival in Montréal during the 1970s. Jackson became the ensemble's sole director in 1988. During the 1980s and 90s the group gave almost 90 concerts in France and Spain including performing and recording early music connected to Montréal and New France.

In 2015, Andrew McAnerney was appointed Artistic Director following the death of Christopher Jackson.

== Concerts ==
The Studio produces an annual season of ten concerts in Montréal, and appears regularly at festivals throughout Canada and internationally. Notable collaborations have included Jordi Savall, Emma Kirkby, Ton Koopman, Skip Sempé, Guillemette Laurens, Matthias Maute, Noel Edison, Suzie LeBlanc and Daniel Taylor.

The ensemble is flexible drawing on a regular core of professional vocalists and instrumentalists. Season concerts vary from a small a cappella ensemble with 12–14 singers, through to large-scale combined orchestra and chorus with a chamber orchestra made up of period instruments.

== Discography ==
Since its inception, the group has released 17 recordings, most recently on the ATMA Classique label.

- 1981 Heinrich Schütz, Historia der Geburt Jesu Christi
- 1993 Heinrich Ignaz Franz Biber, Musique des Vêpres pour solistes, chœur et orchestre
- 1995 Henri Desmarets, Quatre motets lorrains
- 1995 Histoires sacrées, Oratorios de Carisimi et Charpentier
- 1995 Le chant de la Jérusalem des terres froides
- 1997 Palestrina, Missa «Ut, Ré, Mi, Fa, Sol, La» and other sacred works
- 1998 Heavenly Spheres
- 2001 Montréal et les Indiens Abénakis (reissue of Le chant de la Jérusalem des terres froides)
- 2002 Sacred Spaces, Motets by Gabrieli and Monteverdi for choir and instruments
- 2003 Giovanni Gabrieli, Puer Natus Est
- 2004 Arvo Pärt: Stabat Mater
- 2006 Marc-Antoine Charpentier
- 2007 Rise, O my soul
- 2007 Roma Triumphans
- 2009 Orlande de Lassus, Lagrime di San Pietro
- 2011 Musica Vaticana (ACD22508)
- 2014 Terra Tremuit (ACD22653)
- 2017 Orlande de Lassus, Laudate Dominum (ACD22746)

== Awards ==
- 1998 Juno Award - Nominated «Classical Album of the Year: Vocal or Choral Performance» for Palestrina, Missa «Ut, Ré, Mi, Fa, Sol, La» and other sacred works
- 1999 Prix Félix - Won Disc of the Year for Heavenly Spheres.
- 2000 Juno Award - Nominated «Classical Album of the Year: Vocal or Choral Performance» for Heavenly Spheres.
- 2006 Prix Opus - Nominated Disc of the Year for Marc-Antoine Charpentier.
- 2007 Prix Opus - Nominated Disc of the Year for Rise, O my soul.
- 2008 Prix Opus - Won Concert of the Year for Jerusalem des terres froides.
- 2010 Prix Opus - Won Concert of the Year for Le Faste de la France.
- 2012 Prix Opus - Won Disc of the Year for Lagrime de San Pietro.
- 2015 Juno Award - Nominated «Classical Album of the Year: Vocal or Choral Performance» for Terra Tremuit.
- 2017 Prix Opus - Nominated Concert of the Year for Desires of the Soul.
