= Lyric Baltimore =

Music venue in Baltimore, Maryland, U.S.

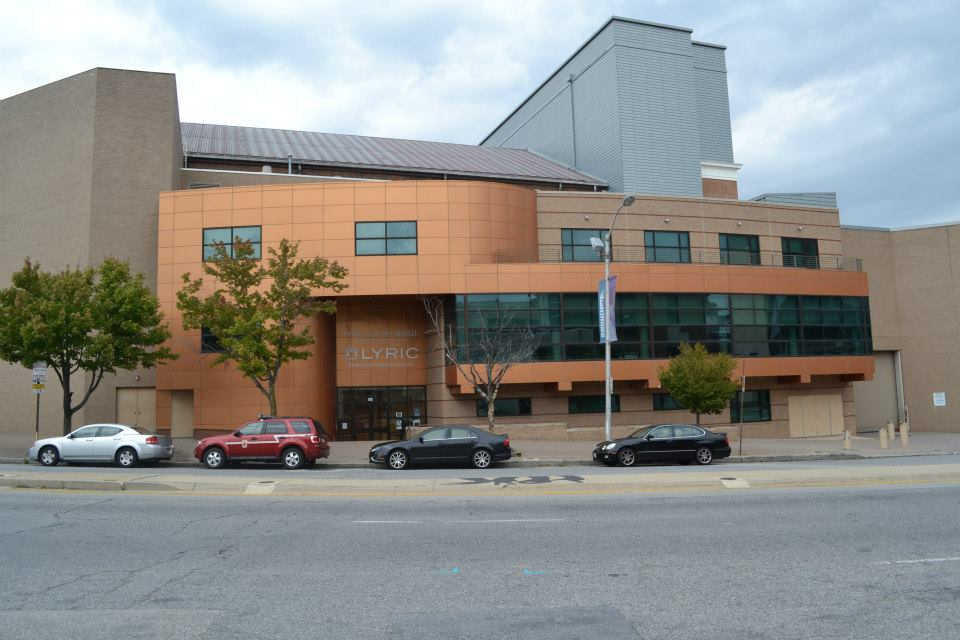
- Exterior of venue (September 2013)
- Interactive map of Lyric Baltimore
- Former names: The Music Hall (1894-1909); Lyric Opera House (1909-2010); The Patricia & Arthur Modell Performing Arts Center at the Lyric (2010-2021)
- Address: 140 West Mount Royal Avenue; Baltimore, MD 21201-5714; Baltimore
- Owner: The Lyric Foundation
- Operator: Lyric Productions, LLC
- Capacity: 2,564
- Public transit: Mt. Royal/MICA

Construction
- Opened: October 31, 1894
- Renovated: 1908, 1921, 1980-82, 2010-11, 2014

Tenants
- Metropolitan Opera (1904-Present); Lyric Opera Baltimore (2011-2017); Baltimore Symphony Orchestra (1916-82); Baltimore Opera Company (1950-2009)

Website
- Venue Website
- Lyric Theatre
- U.S. National Register of Historic Places
- Location within Baltimore Location within Maryland Location within the United States
- Coordinates: 39°18′20″N 76°37′9″W
- Built: 1893
- Architect: T. Henry Randall
- Architectural style: Renaissance
- NRHP reference No.: 86000131
- Added to NRHP: January 23, 1986

The Lyric Baltimore is a music venue in Baltimore, Maryland, United States, located close to the University of Baltimore law school. The building was modeled after the Concertgebouw concert hall in Amsterdam, and it was inaugurated on October 31, 1894, with a performance by the Boston Symphony Orchestra and Australian opera singer Nellie Melba as the featured soloist. Beginning in 1904, it was also used for touring performances by the Metropolitan Opera, and from 1950, it was the home of the Baltimore Opera Company until that company's liquidation in 2009.

The venue was originally called The Music Hall at its founding in 1894. Between 1909 and 2010, it was known as the Lyric Opera House. When entrepreneur and football team owner Art Modell and his wife pledged a $3.5 million donation in 2010, it was renamed The Patricia & Arthur Modell Performing Arts Center at the Lyric in their honor. The name reverted to "Lyric Baltimore" on March 31, 2021.

Lyric Baltimore was home of the Lyric Opera Baltimore, founded after the demise of Baltimore Lyric Opera, from 2011 to 2017.

== History ==
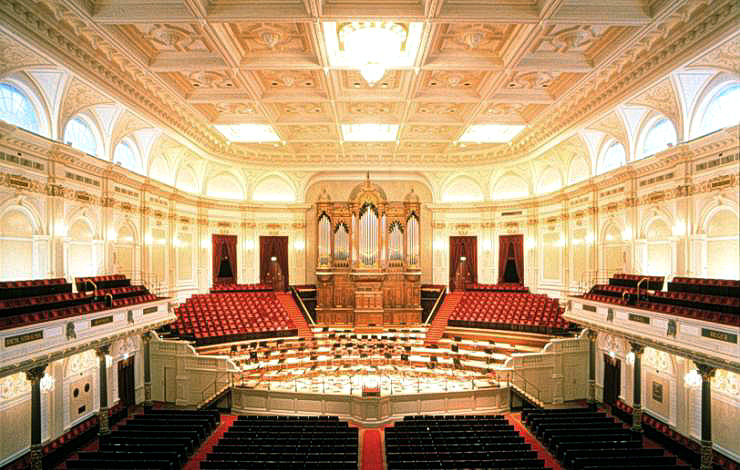
The Grote Zaal (Great Hall) of the Concertgebouw after which the Baltimore Lyric Opera House was modeled

Over the years, the venue has had various names, beginning with "The Music Hall" (1894-1909). In 1909, it became the "Lyric Opera House", its name for rest of the twentieth century. The name was changed to "The Patricia & Arthur Modell Performing Arts Center at the Lyric" in 2010, in recognition of a $3.5 million donation over a 10-year period beginning that year by Baltimore Ravens football team owner Art Modell and his wife Patricia Breslin. The name reverted to "Lyric Baltimore" on March 31, 2021.

=== Opera and music at the Lyric Baltimore ===
Prior to the 1909 purchase of the building on behalf of the Metropolitan Opera by Otto Kahn, Oscar Hammerstein I presented an opera season and began to make plans to remodel it by enlarging the stage area. However Kahn's purchase caused the venue's name to be changed to the Lyric Theatre. and firmed up the continuity of the Metropolitan Opera's annual visits. In the early 20th century, the Lyric Opera featured opera tenor Enrico Caruso who appeared there with the Metropolitan Opera in a performance of Flotow's Martha.

In 1950, building on earlier amateur efforts, the Baltimore Opera was formally established as the Baltimore Civic Opera Company, with the famous American soprano Rosa Ponselle as its first artistic director. She brought Beverly Sills to Baltimore for a production of Manon in 1952. By 1970, the name was changed to Baltimore Opera Company and had become firmly established at the Lyric.

Having been modeled on the Concertgebouw, the Lyric was primarily used as a concert hall. 1916 saw the founding of the Baltimore Symphony Orchestra which presented performances there until 1982, while the building was purchased from Kahn in 1920 and a significant renovation created an enlarged balcony with seating capacity reaching 2,800. In March 1974, the Lyric's 75th anniversary featured the return of the Boston Symphony Orchestra, and throughout these years, the Philadelphia Orchestra made regular appearances in Baltimore until April 1980. A highlight was the 1934 premiere of Rachmaninoff's Rhapsody on a Theme of Paganini, with the composer at the piano.

=== Other events ===
Many different kinds of events were presented at Lyric Baltimore, including sporting events such as the 1905 lightweight boxing fight between Joe Gans, the lightweight champion, and Mike Sullivan and the 1906 wrestling bout between Gus Schoenlein and the world champion, George Hackenschmidt, the world champion of the time. The first public showing of electric cooking in Baltimore took place, as well as hosting speakers like Aimee Semple McPherson, Will Rogers, Richard Byrd, Clarence Darrow, Amelia Earhart, Charles Lindbergh and William Jennings Bryan.

In 1967, The Doors performed at the Lyric.

Performers appearing at the Lyric included in April/May 1984 Yul Brynner who starred in The King and I which over 70,000 people attended in four weeks. That same year, Patti Labelle's performances sold out five performances while, in 1987, Cats played to over 75,000 people.

=== Creating an opera house ===
Major renovations from 1980 to 1982 completed its transformation into an opera house.
