= Libre =

Libre may refer to:

== Computing ==
- Libre software, free software
- Libre Computer Project, developer of open-hardware single-board computers

== Music ==
- Libre (Alejandra Guzmán album)
- Libre (Jennifer Peña album)
- Libre (Marc Anthony album)
- Libre, album by Nino Bravo, includes its namesake song
  - "Libre" (Nino Bravo song)
- Libre (Sébastien Izambard album)
- "Libre" (Álvaro Soler song)
- Libre.fm, a music community website

== Other uses ==
- FreeStyle Libre, a glucose monitoring device
- French ship Libre, two ships of the French Navy
- Libre (Guatemala), a defunct progressive political party
- Libre (Honduras) or Liberty and Refoundation, a left-wing political party
- Libre (word), the English adjective
- Libre (publisher), a Japanese publisher
- The LIBRE Initiative, a nonprofit grassroots advocacy organization for the Hispanic and Latino American community

== See also ==
- Vers libre
- LibreOffice, free and open source office suite
- Enciclopedia Libre Universal en Español
- Libra (disambiguation)
- Liber (disambiguation)
- Libres (disambiguation)
- Livre (disambiguation)
