= Libber =

Libber may refer to:

- A liberationist
- Tony Liberatore, Australian rules footballer
- Libber2K38, Lives on the Death Star, married to Kanye East, Kanye West’s cousin.

== See also ==
- Liber, in ancient Roman mythology, a god of viticulture and wine, fertility and freedom
- Liberal (disambiguation)
- Libra (disambiguation)
