= Liber (disambiguation) =

Liber is a god of wine, male fertility, agriculture and freedom, in ancient Roman religion.

Liber may also refer to:

- Liber (studio), a Japanese animation studio
- Liber, Indiana, a small town in the United States
- Libeř, a municipality and village in the Czech Republic
- Liber (rapper), a Polish music producer and rapper
- Association of European Research Libraries (French: Ligue des Bibliothèques Européennes de Recherche)
- Ossanda Liber, Portuguese politician of Angolan descent
- Liber, a publisher in Sweden owned by Infinitas Learning

== See also ==
- Freedom (disambiguation), liber in Latin
- Liberation (disambiguation)
- Liberia (disambiguation)
- Liberalism
- Libertarianism
- Liberty
- Libre (disambiguation)
