= Blackheart Man =

Studio album by Bunny Wailer
- Released: 8 September 1976
- Recorded: August 1975
- Studio: Aquarius, Kingston, Jamaica
- Genre: Roots reggae
- Length: 45:50
- Label: Solomonic, Tuff Gong, Island
- Producer: Bunny Wailer

Bunny Wailer chronology
Blackheart Man (1976)	Protest (1977)

Professional ratings
Review scores
Source	Rating
AllMusic	5/5 stars
Christgau's Record Guide	A−
Mojo	5/5 stars
The Rolling Stone Album Guide	5/5 stars

Blackheart Man is the debut album by Bunny Wailer, released on 8 September 1976, in Jamaica on Solomonic Records and internationally on Island Records.

== Overview ==
The songs on the album are regarded as the finest written by Bunny Wailer, and explore themes such as repatriation ("Dreamland"), and his arrest for marijuana possession ("Fighting Against Conviction", originally titled "Battering Down Sentence"). "This Train" is very loosely based on the American gospel standard of the same name. The album features some of Jamaica's leading musicians and also contributions from Bob Marley and Peter Tosh of the Wailers on backing vocals, and the Wailers rhythm section of Carlton and Aston Barrett on some of the tracks. The origins of the album title goes back to Wailer's childhood in the Jamaican countryside, where he grew up in the same village as his friend Bob Marley.

Wailer said:

Well, the Blackheart Man is a very serious fable; when we were kids, we all grew up hearing about this Blackheart Man, and we were told that you had to be careful of strangers who might walk up to you and invite you into a situation, or you might be found in the lonely countryside, or in the gullies, or anywhere that this individual might have shown up, and then he would take your heart out. So it brought fear on all the youths of that time when they heard the name, Blackheart Man. So I did the album based on my experiences.

Bunny Wailer himself considers Blackheart Man to be his best solo album. As he told Jamaican newspaper The Daily Gleaner in June 2009:

I will make good albums, yes, for I have made good albums - Liberation, Protest, Struggle, My Father's House, Rock and Groove. All them album is really good album - Marketplace - but Blackheart Man is really an exceptional album, as to the valuation of the message and the number of people who have received that message and have made themselves better people through them lives within the spiritual and cultural settings that the Blackheart Man exhibits.

This is one of the three Wailers solo albums released in 1976, along with Peter Tosh's album Legalize It and Bob Marley's Rastaman Vibration. The album was listed in the 1999 book The Rough Guide: Reggae: 100 Essential CDs.

== Release history ==
The original LP release of the album was released in two different mixes. The international mix is what is most widely available and has appeared on CD. The Jamaican mix has longer versions of songs and different overdubs. In particular, the Jamaican mix of "This Train" lasts a full minute longer. Although the Jamaican mix has not appeared on CD, it remains a favorite amongst reggae aficionados.

The album has been released on compact disc several times; first in 1989 on Mango Records, then in 2002 on Island in a remastered edition. A new remastering was released on iTunes in 2009, with some of the songs in newly extended and dub versions.

== Track listing ==
All songs written by Bunny Wailer except where noted

Side A

1. "Blackheart Man" – 6:17
2. "Fighting Against Conviction" – 5:11
3. "The Oppressed Song" – 3:22
4. "Fig Tree" – 3:07
5. "Dream Land" (Al "Bunk" Johnson, Wailer) – 2:47

Side B

1. "Rastaman" – 3:51
2. "Reincarnated Souls" – 3:43
3. "Amagideon (Armagedon)" – 6:46
4. "Bide Up" – 2:33
5. "This Train" (Wailer, Guthrie) – 8:28

== Personnel ==
Musicians

- Bunny Wailer – lead vocals, backing vocals, percussion (A1, A2, B5), acoustic guitar (A3, B4, B5), bass guitar (B2), timbales (A3, B2), bongos (B2), jaw harp (B4)
- Carlton "Carly" Barrett – drums
- Aston "Family Man" Barrett – bass (A3, B1, B3), lead guitar (B2), rhythm guitar, keyboards (A2, B2)
- Robbie Shakespeare – bass (A1, A2, A4, B5)
- Tyrone "Organ D" Downie – keyboards (A1, A3, A5, B1-B5), melodica (B5)
- Peter Tosh – rhythm guitar (A2-B4), lead guitar (A3, A4, B2), backing vocals (A2, A5, B4), melodica (B1, B3), harmonica (B4)
- Earl "Chinna" Smith – lead guitar (A3, A4, B1-B3)
- Tommy McCook – flute (A1, A2, B3, B4), saxophone (A2, A4, B2)
- "Dirty" Harry Hall – horns (A2-B3)
- Bobby Ellis – horns (A2-A4, B1, B3)
- Herman Marquis – horns (A2, A3, B1, B3)
- Mark West – horns (A4)
- Harold Butler – keyboards (A3-A5, B1-B3)
- Bernard "Touter" Harvey – keyboards (A4)
- Winston Wright – keyboards (A2)
- Karl Pitterson – acoustic guitar (B5)
- Michael Murray – rhythm guitar (A3)
- Eric Frater – lead guitar (B1, B3)
- Bob Marley – backing vocals (A5)
- Franscisco Willie Pep – bongos (B1, B3)
- Larry McDonald – congas (B4)
- Neville Garrick – percussion (B5)

Production

- Bunny Wailer – producer, cover design
- Karl Pitterson – sound engineer, mix engineer
- Chris Blackwell – mix engineer
- Neville Garrick – cover artwork, cover design, photography
