= Carousel (Marcia Griffiths album) =

Studio album by Marcia Griffiths
- Released: 1990
- Label: Mango
- Producer: The Jerks (Rafael Vigil, Lawrence Dermer, Joe Galdo)

Marcia Griffiths chronology
Marcia (1988)	Carousel (1990)	Indomitable (1993)

Carousel is an album by the Jamaican musician Marcia Griffiths, released in 1990. It was her first solo album for Mango Records.

The album peaked at No. 26 on Billboard's Heatseekers Albums chart. "Electric Boogie", which was originally a hit in 1982, peaked at No. 51 on the Billboard Hot 100. Griffiths promoted the album by touring with the Reggae Sunsplash festival. "Electric Boogie" is credited with popularizing the Electric Slide.

== Production ==
Recorded in Florida, the album was produced by Rafael Vigil, Lawrence Dermer, and Joe Galdo. Many sources claim that a version of "Electric Boogie" was written by Bunny Wailer in 1976 or 1980, a statement Griffiths has sought to refute; the album contains a house-influenced dub remix of the track. According to Griffiths, the first version of "Electric Boogie" was written exclusively for her by Wailer in late 1982, reaching the top spot on the charts in Jamaica in 1983.

== Critical reception ==
Professional ratings
Review scores
Source	Rating
AllMusic	3/5 stars
Calgary Herald	C−
The Encyclopedia of Popular Music	3/5 stars
MusicHound World: The Essential Album Guide	2.5/5 stars

The Boston Globe wrote that Griffiths "drops reggae in favor of a high-tech disco/R&B sound." The Washington Post praised the "radical electro-calypso reworking" of the album's cover songs. The Calgary Herald concluded that "people with happy feet may like this, but reggae fans need not apply." The Advocate stated that, "despite the lavish production, the tracks don't sound repetitive... Approaching Carousel with the knowledge that its not a real reggae record, it turns out to be a winner."

The Austin American-Statesman noted that "it all carries a sort of progressive, Jamaican, middle-of-the-road pop sound guaranteed to offend hard-core reggae fans... But it may well serve as a crossover point, if admittedly a diluted and somewhat dubious one, for a new audience." The Gazette determined that the "production is all too slick and awash with processed horns and synthesizers... Yet the collection is also exuberant." The Dallas Morning News thought that Griffiths's "innate sense of rhythm serves her well in the various contexts she sets up."

== Track listing ==
No.	Title	Length
1.	"Electric Boogie"
2.	"Do Unto Others"
3.	"Groovin'"
4.	"All Over the World"
5.	"Carousel"
6.	"Sugar Shack"
7.	"The One Who Really Loves You"
8.	"Money in the Bank"
9.	"Electric Boogie (Dub Mix)"
