= Retrospective (Bunny Wailer album) =

Retrospective: Classic Tracks From A Legendary Artist

Compilation album by Bunny Wailer
- Released: 1995
- Genre: Reggae
- Label: Solomonic/Shanachie

Professional ratings
Review scores
Source	Rating
allmusic	4.5/5 stars

Retrospective is a compilation album of Bunny Wailer's work from 1986 to 1992. The album was originally released by Wailer's own Solomonic Music/Shanachie Records in 1995, and was re-released in 2003 by RAS Records.

== Track listing ==
1. "Roots, Radics, Rockers, Reggae" ^{1}
2. "Rock 'N' Groove" ^{2}
3. "Love Fire" ^{1}
4. "Soul Rebel" ^{3}
5. "Want to Come Home" ^{4}
6. "Ballroom Floor" ^{5}
7. "Rise and Shine" ^{4}
8. "Cool Runnings" ^{2}
9. "Rockers" ^{1}
10. "Liberation" ^{4}
11. "Time Will Tell" ^{3}
12. "Warrior" ^{6}
13. "Dance Hall Music" ^{7}
14. "Dog War" ^{6}
15. "Conscious Lyrics" ^{2}
16. "Redemption Song" ^{3}
- ^{1}1,3,9 taken from In I Father's House (1979)/Roots Radics Rockers Reggae (1983)
- ^{2}2,8,15 taken from Rock 'n' Groove (1981)
- ^{3}4,11,16 taken from Time Will Tell: A Tribute to Bob Marley (1990)
- ^{4}5,7,10 taken from Liberation (1988)
- ^{5}6 taken from Rootsman Skanking (1987)
- ^{6}12,14 taken from Gumption (1990)
- ^{7}13 taken from Marketplace (1985)
