= Liberation =

Liberation or liberate is to be freed from or opposed to traditional social and sexual attitudes or roles, to be set at liberty.

Liberation or liberate may also refer to:

== Film and television ==
- Liberation (film series), a 1970–1971 series about the Great Patriotic War
- "Liberation" (The Flash), a 2020 TV episode
- "Liberation" (K-9), a 2010 TV episode
- "Liberation" (Quantum Leap), a 1993 TV episode

== Gaming ==
- Liberation: Captive 2, an Amiga computer game, 1993
- Killzone: Liberation, for PlayStation Portable, 2006
- Assassin's Creed III: Liberation, 2012
- Liberated (video game), 2020

== Media ==
- Liberation (magazine), American pacifist magazine published 1956 to 1977
- Libération, a French newspaper
- Libération (Morocco), a Moroccan newspaper
- Libération (newspaper, 1941–1964), a French newspaper
- Liberation News, the newspaper of the Party for Socialism and Liberation
- Liberation: Being the Adventures of the Slick Six After the Collapse of the United States of America, a novel by Brian Francis Slattery, 2008
- Oslobođenje ('Liberation'), a Bosnian newspaper

== Music ==
=== Albums ===
- Liberation (1349 album), 2003
- Liberation (Bunny Wailer album), 1989
- Liberation (Christina Aguilera album), 2018
- Liberation (The Divine Comedy album), 1993
- Liberation (Mýa album), 2007
- Liberation (Talib Kweli and Madlib album), 2007
- Liberation (ZZ Ward album), 2025
- Liberation: Songs to Benefit PETA, by various artists, 2003
- Liberation (EP), by Devils in Heaven, 1993
- Libération (album), by Les Rythmes Digitales, 1996
- Liberation, by Ice Age, 2001
- Liberation, by Jackie-O Motherfucker, 2001
- Liberation, by Karsh Kale, 2003
- Liberation, by Trans Am, 2004
- The Liberation, by Disillusion, 2019

=== Songs ===
- "Liberation" (Pet Shop Boys song), 1994
- "Liberation" (Lippy Lou song), 1995
- "Liberation", by Bunny Wailer from Liberation, 1989
- "Liberation", by Devin Townsend from Epicloud, 2012
- "Liberation", by Earth, Wind & Fire from Illumination, 2005
- "Liberation", by Grave from Burial Ground, 2010
- "Liberation", by Hardcore Superstar from Bad Sneakers and a Piña Colada, 2000
- "Liberation", by In Flames from Sounds of a Playground Fading, 2011
- "Liberation", by Katatonia from Night Is the New Day, 2009
- "Liberation", by Kevin Coyne from Politicz, 1982
- "Liberation" (1999) and "Liberation (Fly Like An Angel)" (2001), by Matt Darey
- "Liberation", by Mike Oldfield from The Millennium Bell, 1999
- "Liberation", by Muse from Will of the People, 2022
- "Liberation", by Neaera from Armamentarium, 2007
- "Liberation", by Outkast featuring Cee-Lo on Aquemini, 1998
- "Liberation", by Twelve Foot Ninja from Silent Machine, 2012
- "Liberation", by Village People from Can't Stop the Music, 1980
- "Liberation", by Vision of Disorder from Vision of Disorder, 1996
- "Liberate" (Disturbed song), 2003
- "Liberate" (Eric Prydz song), 2014
- "Liberate", by Reks from The Greatest X, 2016
- "Liberate", by Remy Shand from The Way I Feel, 2002
- "Liberate", by Slipknot from Slipknot, 1999
- "Liberate", by Superheist from Identical Remote Controlled Reactions, 2003
- "Liberated", by Amaranthe from The Catalyst, 2024

=== Concert tours ===
- The Liberation Tour (Mary J. Blige and D'Angelo tour), 2012–2013
- The Liberation Tour (Christina Aguilera tour), 2018

=== Record labels ===
- Liberation Music, an Australian record label
- Liberation Records, an American record company

== Other uses ==
- Liberation (Holocaust memorial), in Jersey City, U.S.
- Liberation (organisation), founded in the UK in 1954, originally as the Movement for Colonial Freedom
- Liberation (painting), by Odd Nerdrum, 1974
- Liberation (pharmacology), when medication enters the body
- Liberation (play), by Bess Wohl, 2025
- Liberation fonts, four TrueType fonts
- Reformed Churches in the Netherlands (Liberated), called the "Liberated churches"

== See also ==
- Gay liberation
- Liberalization, making laws, systems, or opinions less severe
- Liberationist (disambiguation)
- Liberator (disambiguation)
- Libration, in lunar astronomy
- Liberation Day
- Liberation psychology
- Emancipation, to procure economic and social rights, political rights or equality
- Jiefang (disambiguation) (Chinese, 'liberation')
- Liberation of France, in the Second World War
- Liberation theology, a Christian theological approach
- Moksha, a term in Indian religions
- National Liberation Movement (disambiguation)
- Nirvana, a religious concept
- Revolution (disambiguation)
- Sexual revolution, or Sexual liberation
- Tahrir (disambiguation) (Arabic, 'liberation')
- Wars of national liberation
- Women's liberation movement
