= Libran =

Libran may refer to:

- A person with the Libra astrological sign
- Librán, Galicia, a civil parish in Baleira, Galicia, Spain
- Librán [es], a settlement in Toreno, León, Spain
- Libran N. Cabactulan (born 1950), Filipino diplomat and ambassador
- Frankie Librán (1948–2013), Puerto Rican athlete and baseball infielder
- Julie de Libran (born 1972), French fashion designer

== See also ==
- Libra (disambiguation)
