= Liberazione =

Liberazione is Italian for liberation. It may refer to:

- Liberation Day (Italy), April 25, the anniversary of the 1945 fall of Mussolini's Italian Social Republic; a public holiday in Italy
  - The Italian resistance movement's "War of Liberation" or "War of Resistance" during World War II in general
- Liberazione (newspaper), a newspaper maintained by the Partito della Rifondazione Comunista (Communist Refoundation Party), a splinter faction of the Italian Communist Party

== See also ==
- Liberation (disambiguation)
- End of World War II in Europe
- Liberation Day in other countries
