= Gumption (album) =

Studio album by Bunny Wailer
- Released: 1990
- Genre: Reggae, dancehall
- Label: Shanachie
- Producer: Bunny Wailer

Bunny Wailer chronology
Time Will Tell: A Tribute to Bob Marley (1990)	Gumption (1990)	Just Be Nice (1993)

Gumption is an album by the Jamaican musician Bunny Wailer. It was released in 1990 via Shanachie Records. The album peaked at No. 10 on Billboard's World Albums chart. Gumption was nominated for a Grammy Award for "Best Reggae Album".

== Production ==
Wailer wanted to incorporate a dance hall element into the album's sound. "Warrior" is a cover of the Johnny Osbourne song. "Peiaka 'Bus Dem Shut'" was written by the Wailers in the 1960s. "Dog War" and "Never Grow Old" were written by Toots Hibbert. "Reggae Burden" refers to Bunny's position as the last Wailer, as well as his role as a promoter of reggae.

== Critical reception ==
Professional ratings
Review scores
Source	Rating
AllMusic	3/5 stars
Chicago Tribune	2.5/4 stars
Robert Christgau	(neither)
The Encyclopedia of Popular Music	2/5 stars
Los Angeles Daily News	1/4 stars
MusicHound World: The Essential Album Guide	3/5 stars
The Rolling Stone Album Guide	3/5 stars

The Gazette deemed the album "a tribute to the diversity of Jamaican reggae styles, from ska and rock steady, to lover's rock, roots and dancehall... It's a richly melodic, uplifting set from start to finish, spearheaded by the bold and caring vocals of a reggae veteran." The Chicago Tribune concluded that, "while not as aggressively 'dancey' as some material now in the marketplace, parts of Gumption are indeed given a 'synthetic' shading by electronic drum beats—although that's generally balanced by a more 'human,' emotional feeling stemming from ebullient melodies and Wailer's warm vocals." The Los Angeles Daily News noted that "the majority of tracks here are lackluster and say nothing new rhythmically."

AllMusic wrote that "Wailer uses simplicity to great advantage... His consistency is a thing to admire."

== Track listing ==
No.	Title	Length
1.	"Sounds Clash"
2.	"Peiaka 'Bus Dem Shut'"
3.	"Dog War"
4.	"See and Blind"
5.	"Warrior"
6.	"Never Grow Old"
7.	"Gumption"
8.	"Wheel Yo Belly"
9.	"Don Man"
10.	"Reggae Burden"
