= Rule Dance Hall =

Studio album by Bunny Wailer
- Released: 1987
- Genre: Reggae
- Label: Shanachie

Bunny Wailer chronology
| Rootsman Skanking (1987) | Rule Dance Hall (1987) | Liberation (1988) |

Rule Dance Hall is an album by the Jamaican reggae musician Bunny Wailer. It was released in 1987 via Shanachie Records.

== Production ==
The album was made with the Roots Radics band. Rule Dance Hall contains cover versions of Sam Cooke's "Saturday Night" and the Wailers' "Stir It Up".

== Critical reception ==
Professional ratings
Review scores
| Source | Rating |
|---|---|
| AllMusic | 3/5 stars |
| Robert Christgau | B |
| The Encyclopedia of Popular Music | 2/5 stars |
| The Rolling Stone Album Guide | 3/5 stars |

The State called the album Wailer's "most successful outing in years," writing that he's "returned to the heavy drums and bass rhythms that are prevalent in the Jamaican dance halls." Stephen Davis, in The Reggae & African Beat, called the album "as brilliant as anything Bob Marley ever did." High Fidelity wrote that it celebrates "the lighter, good-times nature of Jamaica's music." The Boston Globe deemed the album "just a misguided mistake."

AllMusic wrote that "Bunny is in top form to deliver a set of old-school-tempo tunes intent on teaching the newer generation a musical history lesson."

== Track listing ==
| No. | Title | Length |
|---|---|---|
| 1. | "Rule Dance Hall" | 3:53 |
| 2. | "Jolly Session" | 4:05 |
| 3. | "Saturday Night" | 3:38 |
| 4. | "Trash Ina We Bes" | 3:50 |
| 5. | "Put It On" | 3:52 |
| 6. | "Reggae in the U.S.A." | 3:46 |
| 7. | "Haughty Tempo" | 4:41 |
| 8. | "Camouflage" | 3:52 |
| 9. | "Hot Food Head" | 4:17 |
| 10. | "Stir It Up" | 3:38 |
| 11. | "Old Time Sinting" | 3:43 |
| 12. | "Reasons" | 3:08 |
