= Sébastien Izambard =

French singer, member of Il Divo (born 1973)

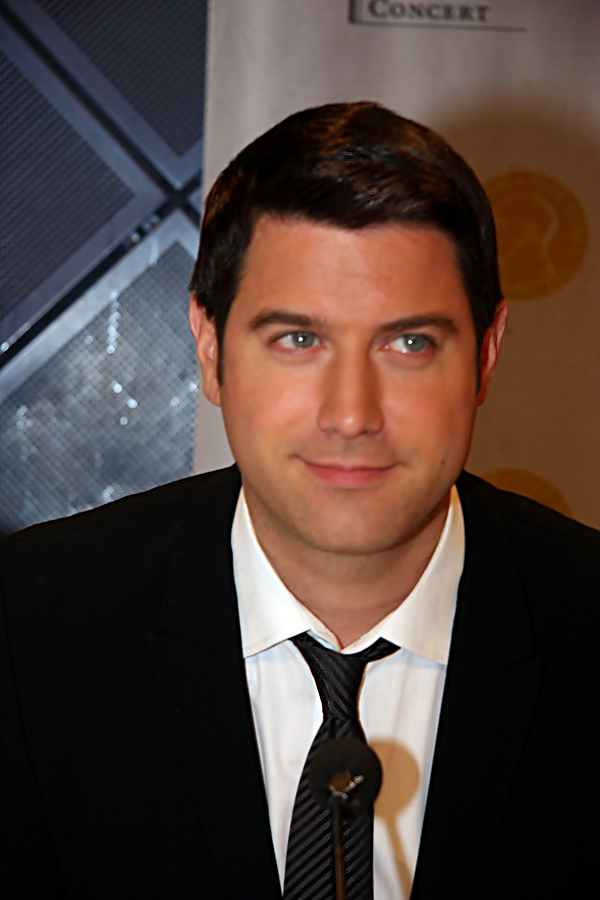
- Izambard in 2008
- Born: 7 March 1973 (age 53); Paris, France
- Occupations: Singer, composer, record producer
- Spouse: Renée Murphy (m. 2008; div. 2018)
- Children: 3
- Musical career
- Genres: Classical crossover, pop, rock, romantic
- Instrument: Vocals
- Years active: 2000–present
- Labels: EMI Music France (2000–2003); Columbia Records (2012–present); Sony BMG / Syco Music (2003–present)
- Website: ildivo.com

Signature
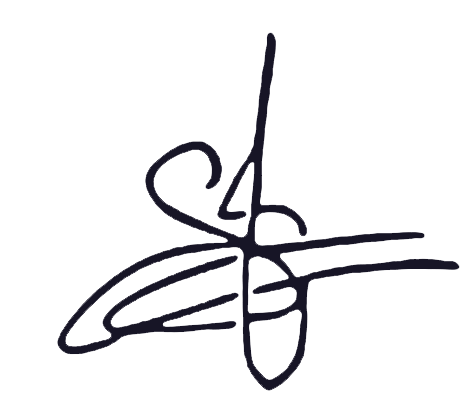

Sébastien Izambard (French: [sebastjɛ̃ izɑ̃baʁ]; born 7 March 1973) is a French singer, composer and record producer. His vocal range is classified as popular melody or vox populi with a tenor tessitura.

He has been a member of the classical crossover group Il Divo since 2004, which has sold over 30 million copies worldwide discs. In 2000, he launched the solo album titled Libre, reaching number No. 1 ranking with the single "Si tu savais" achieving excellent sales ranking in France, Canada and Belgium. Currently, Izambard writes, produces and composes for pop artists of international stature.

Izambard is an active member of the French organization AMTM (Assistance Médicale Toit du Monde) and global ambassador for the Sanfilippo Children's Foundation.

== Early life ==
Izambard's parents divorced and his father left when he was six. He grew up in a poor single-parent household and lived with his mother in a room little bigger than 100sqft on the top floor of a block of apartments in Paris with her great-grandmother. He studied at the Lycée Janson de Sailly in Paris, considered one of the best schools in Europe.

As his mother worked, he grew accustomed to solitude and independence. At age 12, he cooked cakes as a gift for her after her workday. He confessed that for him, becoming an adult was more a way to learn to get out of trouble. Due to this psychological impact, he became a cautious, introverted and repressed child. However, with the help of child specialists, he was able to overcome this feeling of repression.

== Musical career ==
=== Soloist ===
Izambard started his career as a pop musician in France, releasing a solo album called Libre and his song "Si Tu Savais" was ranked first in French Hit Charts. Besides being a singer, Izambard is also an accomplished music composer, pianist, and guitar player In Paris he has written music for many French artists. In 2001, he performed with Johnny Hallyday as a guest in the Olympia Theater in Paris. His music, greatly influenced by Jeff Buckley, earns him the acknowledgement of French and Canadian audiences.

French singer Florent Pagny is his musical godfather.

=== Musical theatre ===
Izambard performed in February 2002 in Richard Cocciante's musical Le Petit Prince, where he played the role of the Business Man. He also performed in several theatre plays as part of the group La Troupe.

He was preparing his second album with Francis Madjouli and Lionel Florence when he became involved with Il Divo.

=== Il Divo ===
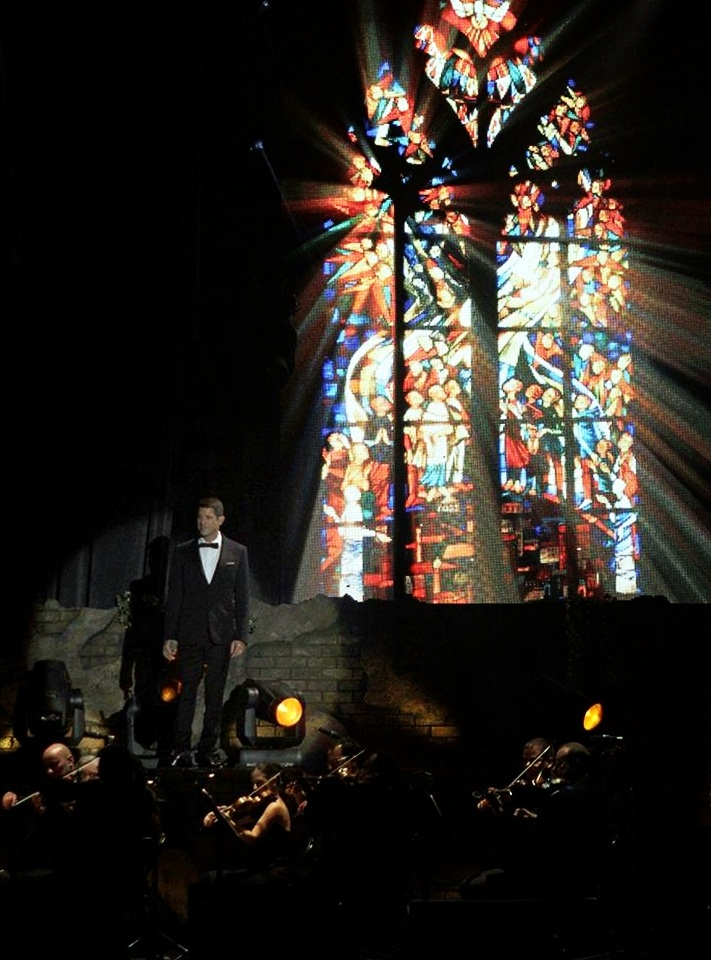
Izambard in 2014

While recording his second solo album after collaborating on Le Petit Prince, Izambard attended an audition for the musical The Sun King. While waiting, he met Geraldine Larrosa, (Innocence) and her then-partner Carlos Marín, who spoke to him after hearing Izambard sing in online videos. Marín said it was worth a try, so Izambard went to the Bastille in Paris, where the auditions were being held by Sonny Takhar. Hearing Izambard "Caruso" performed the song while playing the piano himself, relaxed and convinced that he had nothing to lose since he thought would lead nowhere. However, Cowell heard him and offered him the job. Izambard said to himself "Je ne regrette rien (I have nothing to lose)", accepted and devoted himself in the global musical quartet Il Divo in December 2003, along with Urs Bühler (Switzerland), David Miller (US) and Carlos Marín (Spain). Izambard is the only member of the group who is not classically trained.

Izambard has said that he has two dreams while being in Il Divo: composing a song for the quartet, and singing songs in French. In fact, Ancora, the second album of the group, contains two songs in French: "Je Crois en toi" (a duet partially in French with Céline Dion) and "Pour Que Tu M'Aimes Encore." "I Believe in You" is an original song for both artists, while "Pour Que Tu M'Aimes Encore" is Dion's, considered to be her most famous song in French.

Their first album, called Il Divo became a worldwide multiplatinum selling record when released in November 2004, entering Billboard at number 4; it sold five million copies worldwide in less than a year and knocked Robbie Williams from the number one spot. Their second album, Ancora, was released on 7 November 2005 in the United Kingdom. Il Divo's third album Siempre was released on 21 November 2006 in the United States and on 27 November 2006 internationally. Their latest album, The Promise, was released on 10 November 2008 (world) & 18 November 2008 (US), and shot straight to number 1 in the United Kingdom. In 2013 they published A Musical Affair, the songs of which are inspired by famous plays and musicals.

On 9 June 2006, Il Divo performed the 2006 FIFA World Cup official song "The Time of Our Lives" with R&B singer Toni Braxton live, at half-time, during the opening match between Germany and Costa Rica and again a month later at 9 July closing ceremony. The song is available exclusively on the Voices from the FIFA World Cup compilation album and on the European reissue of Braxton's album Libra but not on any Il Divo album. Il Divo have been on several world tours and have received 50 gold and platinum awards. Their last tour in 2014 covered 5 continents and over 33 countries.

On 12 December 2008, Il Divo performed their new song at the Swedish Idol 2008 finale in the Globen Arena in Stockholm, Sweden. The Paraguay show was Il Divo's biggest capacity performance to date and took place on 20 December 2011, at the Defensores del Chaco Stadium in Asunción, for 33,900 people.

13 May 2012 Il Divo performed the song "Caruso" with a staging of riding the rhythm of the song during the Diamond Jubilee of Elizabeth II at Windsor for the entire royal family and Queen Elizabeth II of the United Kingdom.

On 6 September 2012, it was announced that Il Divo would release a Greatest Hits album. The album was produced by Alberto Quintero and featured songs spanning Il Divo's successful eight-year career to date, as well as four new songs including "My Heart Will Go On", "I Will Always Love You", "Can't Help Falling in Love" and "Alone".

On 19 July 2014, Il Divo performed before a capacity crowd at Edinburgh Castle esplanade where a pop festival took place ahead of the 2014 Commonwealth Games. The group performed "Amazing Grace".

On 23 March 2015, it was announced that Il Divo was the winner of the 2015 Silver Clef Award, giving them the coveted Classic PPL. The gala award ceremony took place on 3 July at the Grosvenor House Hotel, a five-star hotel in London.

=== Record producer and composer ===
Izambard says that composing and writing songs is his passion, writing for the pleasure of writing. Before joining Il Divo, he wrote and produced songs for other French artists.

In parallel with Il Divo, Izambard continued writing songs with pop stars in the world; as with Australian Darren Hayes, the lead singer of Savage Garden; the star of The Phantom of the Opera Ramin Karimloo; Guy Chambers; and with the lyricist Don Black.

In November 2014, Izambard led the project to create an album with different Australian artists for raising money. Izambard, with the help of Sony Pictures Entertainment, produced along with the Spanish producer Alberto Quintero, producer as well of some of the albums of IL Divo, the album titled For Bringing Hope Isla and Jude, which was released on 5 December 2014 with the single written by Kate Bush "This Woman's Work", for St. Filippo Foundation.

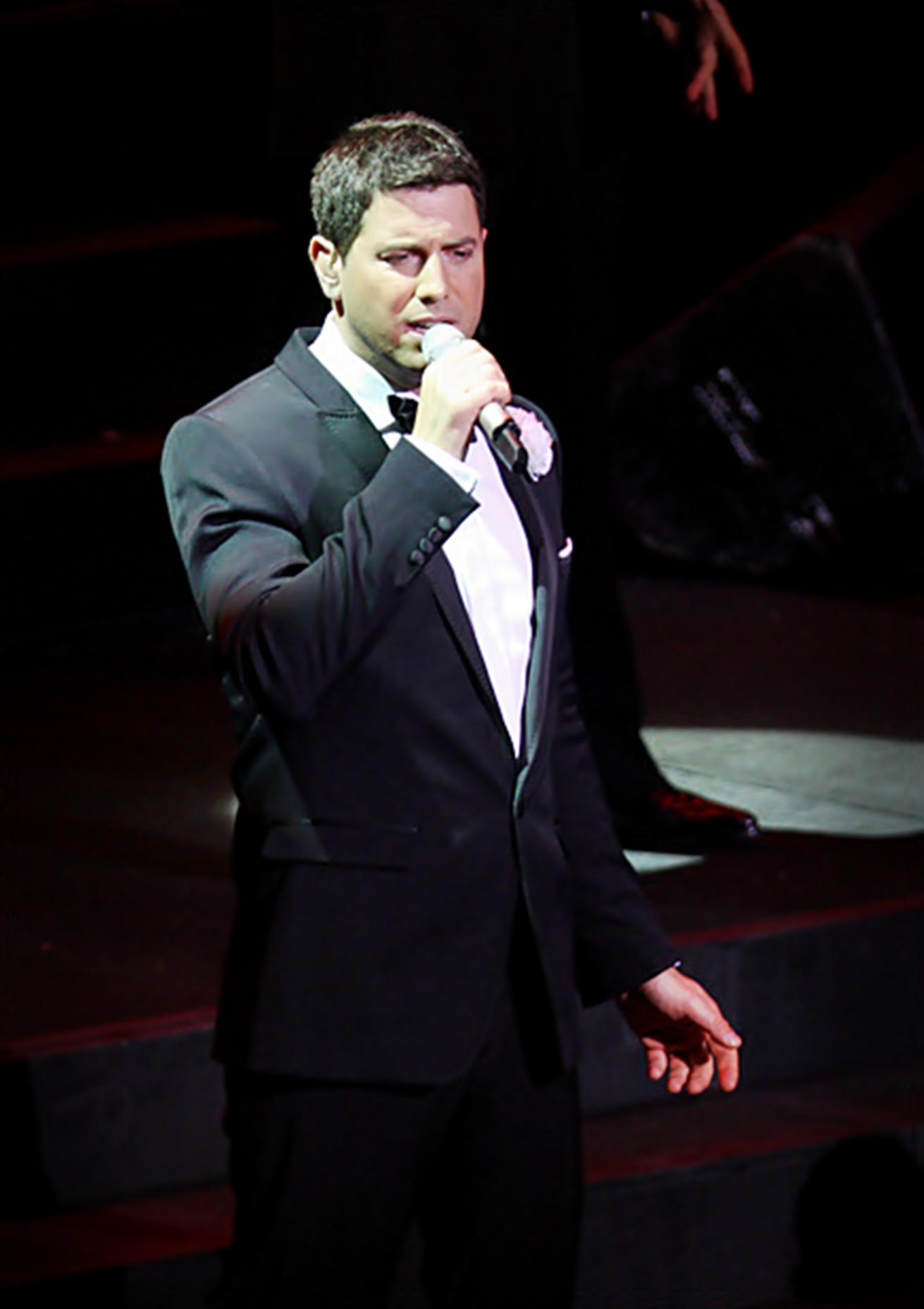
Izambard in 2012

=== Duets and collaborations ===
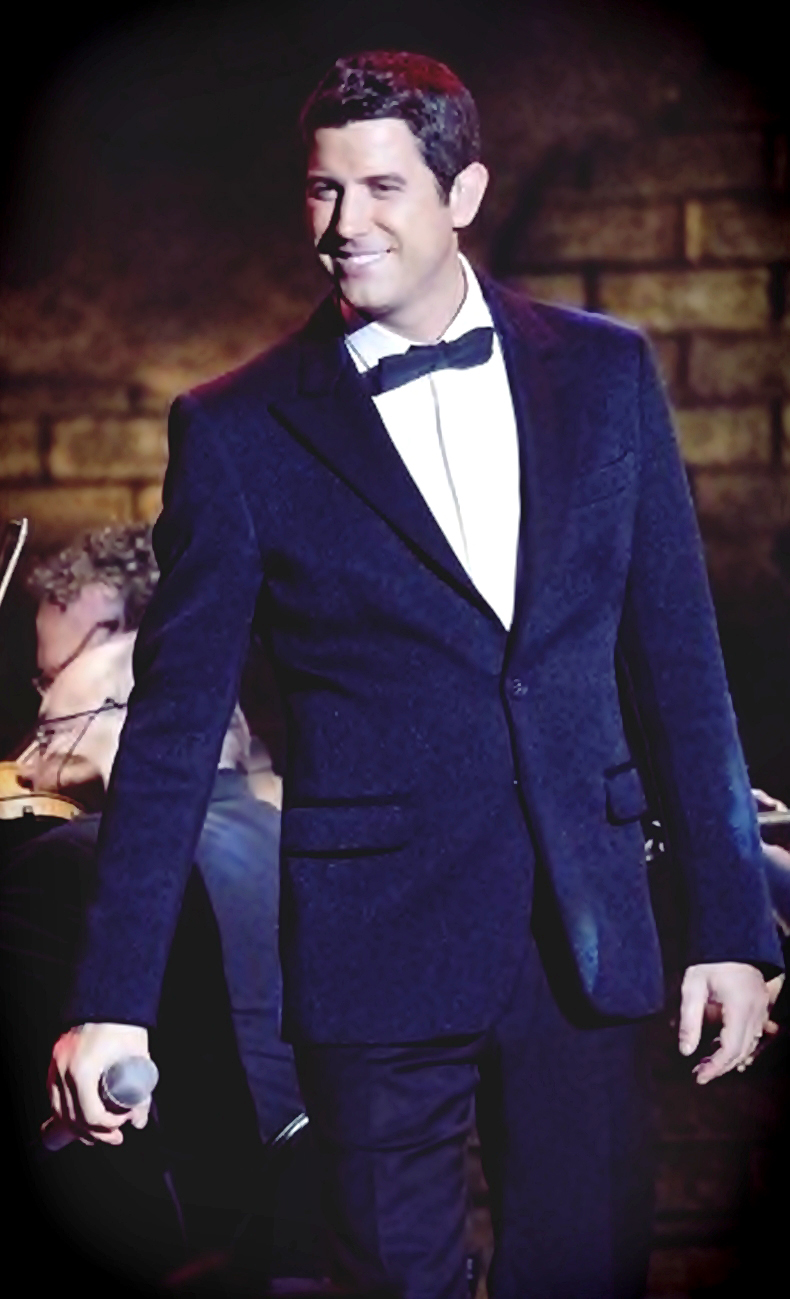
Izambard in 2014

Izambard has made many music & duets collaborations with major artists, both alone and with a member of Il Divo.

- Anggun ("Who Wants to Live Forever")
- Barbra Streisand ("Music of the Night", "Somewhere", "Evergreen")
- Casey Donovan ("This Woman's Work")
- Celine Dion ("I Believe in You (Je crois en toi)")
- Damien Leith ("This Woman's Work")
- Darren Hayes ("This Woman's Work")
- David Campbell ("This Woman's Work")
- Denisse de Kalafe ("Sortilegio de amor")
- Diesel ("This Woman's Work")
- Ella Hooper ("This Woman's Work")
- Engelbert Humperdinck ("Spanish Eyes")
- Florent Pagny ("Belle")
- Heather Headley ("Can You Feel the Love Tonight?")
- Hélène Segara ("Memory")
- Johnny Hallyday
- Juan Gabriel ("Amor eterno")
- Katherine Jenkins ("Somewhere")
- Kristin Chenoweth ("Do You Hear What I Hear", "All I Ask of You")
- Lea Salonga (" A Whole New World)", "Time to say goodbye (Con Te Partirò)", "Can You Feel the Love Tonight?"
- Leona Lewis ("Somewhere")
- Lisa Angell ("Can You Feel the Love Tonight?")
- Luke Steele ("This Woman's Work")
- Marlisa ("This Woman's Work")
- Mazz Murray ("Memory", "Time to say goodbye (Con Te Partirò)", "Music of the Night")
- Michael Ball ("Love Changes Everything")
- Natasha St-Pier ("Aimer")
- Nicole Scherzinger ("Memory")
- Pete Murray ("This Woman's Work")
- Ramin Karimloo ("Broken", "Guiding Light")
- Sonia Lacen ("L'envie d'aimer")
- Toni Braxton ("The Time of Our Lives")
- Vincent Niclo ("Le Temps Des Cathédrales")

== Philanthropy ==
Izambard is an active member of two charities: the French organization AMTM (Assistance Médicale Toit du Monde) which helps poor children in Nepal and India, where during one of his campaigns to raise funds in September 2008, Seb raffled off several of his Armani suits, and the Australian Sanfilippo Children's Foundation organization, of which he is global ambassador.

He recorded two videoclips and collaborated in solidarity projects such as the Noël Ensemble, a record in which more than one hundred artists participated in order to raise funds for the fight against AIDS.

== Personal life ==
Izambard became engaged to Australian Renée Murphy on 1 June 2007 and they married 17 August 2008 in France. Renée was a publicist for Sony BMG when she met Izambard in Australia in 2005, who was on a tour with the group.

A few months before the wedding, on 20 March 2008, Sebastien and Renée became parents of twins, Rose and Luca, who were born in Port-Royal near Paris. On 20 May 2011, the couple's third child, a son, Jude was born.

On 11 September 2018, Murphy began divorce proceedings at the Stanley Mosk Courthouse in Los Angeles. In a Bolivian interview on 29 May 2019, he confirmed he had a new girlfriend.

In 2025 Sebastien became a United States citizen.

== Discography ==
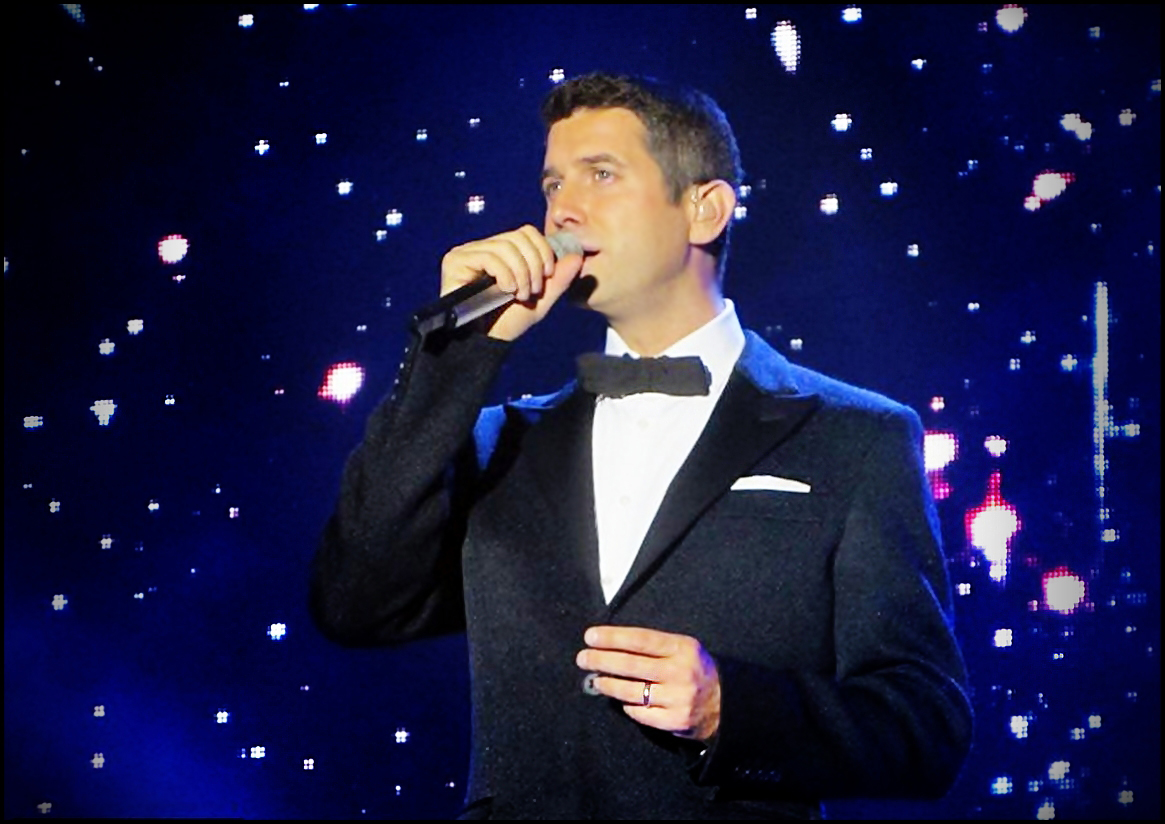
Izambard in 2014

=== Singer ===
==== Solo ====
Studio albums

- 2000 – Libre
- 2018 – We Came Here to Love
- 2022 – FROM SEB WITH LOVE

==== Il Divo ====
Studio albums

1. 2004 – Il Divo
2. 2005 – Ancora
3. 2006 – Siempre
4. 2008 – The Promise
5. 2011 – Wicked Game
6. 2013 – A Musical Affair
7. 2015 – Amor & Pasión
8. 2018 – Timeless

Seasonal album

1. 2005 – The Christmas Collection

Albums Collections

1. 2012 - The Greatest Hits

Live albums

1. 2009 – An Evening with Il Divo: Live in Barcelona
2. 2014 – Live in Japan
3. 2016 – Live in Japan 2016

==== Collaborations other albums ====
1. 2000 – Nöel Ensemble
2. 2005 – On ne change pas; Celine Dion (Il Divo)
3. 2006 – Voices from the FIFA World Cup (Il Divo)
4. 2006 – Libra; Toni Braxton (Il Divo)
5. 2014 – Engelbert Calling; Engelbert Humperdick, song "Spanish Eyes". (Il Divo)
6. 2015 – Los Dúos; Juan Gabriel song "Amor eterno" (Il Divo)

==== Musical theater ====
1. 2002 – Le Petit Prince, (Studio version)
2. 2002 – Le Petit Prince, (Full version)

=== Producer ===
1. 2014 – Hope – This Woman's Work

=== Composer ===
1. 2010 – Ramin de Ramin Karimloo
2. 2011 – Secret Codes and Battleships de Darren Hayes

== Videography ==
=== Soloist ===
- Official video
1. 2004 – Libre

=== Musical works ===
- Musical
1. 2002 – Le Petit Prince

=== Il Divo ===
- Documentary / Concert
1. 2004 – Live at Gotham Hall
2. 2005 – Encore
3. 2005 – Mamá
4. 2006 – The Yule Log: The Christmas Collection
5. 2006 – Live at the Greek Theater
6. 2008 – At the Coliseum
7. 2009 – An Evening with Il Divo: Live in Barcelona
8. 2011 – Live in London
9. 2014 – Live in Japan
10. 2016 – Live in Japan 2016
- Official video
1. 2004 – Regresa a mí
2. 2005 – Mama
3. 2006 – Time of our Lives.
4. 2014 – Le Temps Des Cathédrales
5. 2014 – Who Wants to Live Forever
6. 2014 – Aimer
7. 2014 – Can You Feel the Love Tonight
8. 2014 – Memory
9. 2015 - Amor & Pasión -Trailer-
