= Electric Slide =

Line dance

The Electric (better known as The Electric Slide) is a four-wall line dance. Choreographer and dancer Richard L. "Ric" Silver claims to have created the dance in 1976.

The dance's popularity is sometimes attributed to "Electric Boogie", written by Bunny Wailer and recorded by Marcia Griffiths. The song was first released in December 1982.

There are several variations of the dance. The original choreography has 22 steps, while variants include the Freeze (16 steps), Cowboy Motion (24 steps), Cowboy Boogie (24 steps), and Electric Slide 2 (18 steps). The 18-step variation became popular in 1989 and was listed by Linedancer Magazine as the number-one dance in the world for ten years.

The original choreography was performed in two lines facing each other, with dancers circling those opposite them during the dance.

== Controversy ==
In 2007, Silver issued DMCA-based takedown notices targeting YouTube videos of people performing the 18-step variation. The Electronic Frontier Foundation (EFF) filed suit against Silver on behalf of videographer Kyle Machulis, asking the court to protect Machulis's free speech rights to record several steps of the dance in a documentary posted on the Internet. On May 22, 2007, the parties reached a settlement under which Silver agreed to license the Electric Slide under a Creative Commons noncommercial license and post the license on any of his current or future websites that mention the dance.

In 2021, NPR reporter Patricia Meschino described Silver as the creator of the Electric Slide and noted that Wailer demonstrated the routine in a 1989 video.

The claimed creation date of the Electric Slide has been disputed. Silver stated that he received a demo of "Electric Boogie" in 1976 and used it to create the dance. According to Griffiths, however, Wailer wrote "Electric Boogie" for her in the early 1980s.
