= Protest (album) =

Studio album by Bunny Wailer
- Released: 1977
- Studios: Harry J's, Kingston, Jamaica
- Genre: Roots reggae
- Length: 41:32
- Labels: Solomonic, Island
- Producer: Bunny Wailer

Bunny Wailer chronology
| Blackheart Man (1976) | Protest (1977) | Dubd’sco Vol. 1 (1978) |

Professional ratings
Review scores
| Source | Rating |
|---|---|
| AllMusic | 4/5 stars |
| Christgau's Record Guide | B |
| The Rolling Stone Album Guide | 3/5 stars |

Protest is the second solo album by the Jamaican musician Bunny Wailer. It was released in 1977 in Jamaica on Solomonic Records and internationally on Island Records.

== Track listing ==
All songs written by Bunny Wailer except where noted.

Side one

1. "Moses Children"
2. "Get Up, Stand Up" (Bob Marley, Peter Tosh)
3. "Scheme of Things"
4. "Quit Trying"

Side two

1. "Follow Fashion Monkey"
2. "Wanted Children"
3. "Who Feels It"
4. "Johnny Too Bad" (Bunny Wailer, Trevor Wilson)

== Personnel ==
Musicians

- The Solomonic Enchanters – backing vocals
- Robbie Shakespeare – bass guitar
- Leroy "Horsemouth" Wallace, Michael Richards – drums
- Earl "Chinna" Smith – guitar
- Bobby Ellis, Herman Marquis, Dirty Harry, Tommy McCook – horns
- Bernard "Touter" Harvey, Earl "Wire" Lindo, Keith Sterling – keyboards

Production

- Producer – Bunny Wailer
- Mixing Engineer – Bunny Wailer & Sylvan Morris
- Engineer – Bunny Wailer & Sylvan Morris
