= Line dance =

Choreographed dance

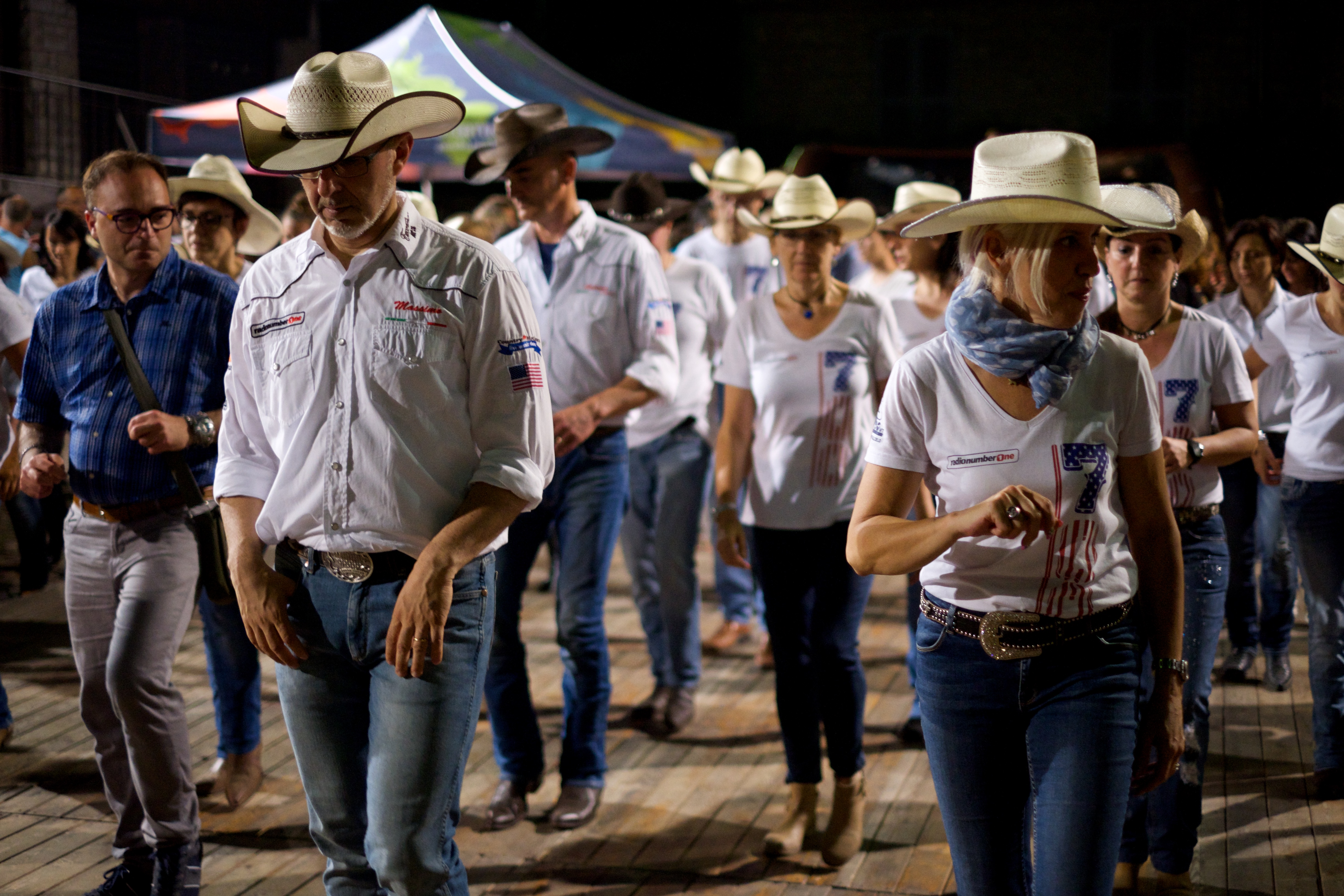
Line dancing at Wikimania 2016 in Esino Lario

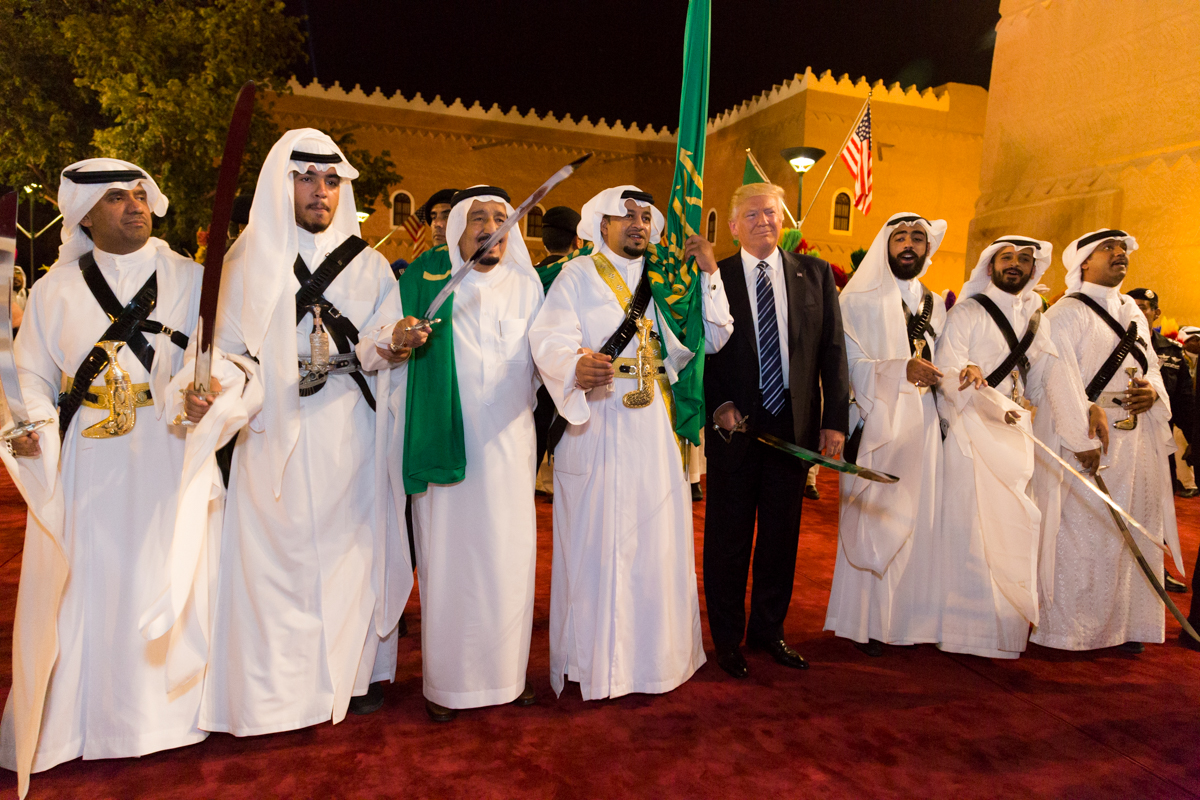
United States President Donald Trump and others performing the ardah in Saudi Arabia.

A line dance is a choreographed dance in which a group of people dance along to a repeating sequence of steps while arranged in one or more lines or rows. These lines usually face all in the same direction, or less commonly face each other. Unlike circle dancing, line dancers are not in physical contact with each other. Each dance is usually associated with, and named for, a specific song, such as the Macarena or the Electric Slide (associated with the 1982 single "Electric Boogie") which are a few of the line dances that have consistently remained part of modern American culture for years.

Line dancing is practiced and learned in country-western dance bars, social clubs, dance clubs and ballrooms. It is sometimes combined on dance programs with other forms of country-western dance, such as two-step, western promenade dances, as well as western-style variants of the waltz, polka and swing. Line dances have accompanied many popular music styles since the early 1970s including pop, swing, rock and roll, disco, Latin (salsa suelta), rhythm and blues and jazz.

The term "modern line dance" is now used in many line dance clubs around the world to indicate dance styles that combine many genres, including pop, Latin, Irish, big band and country. Rather than wearing Western-style clothing or boots, participants dress in casual clothing and often wear dance trainers.

== History ==
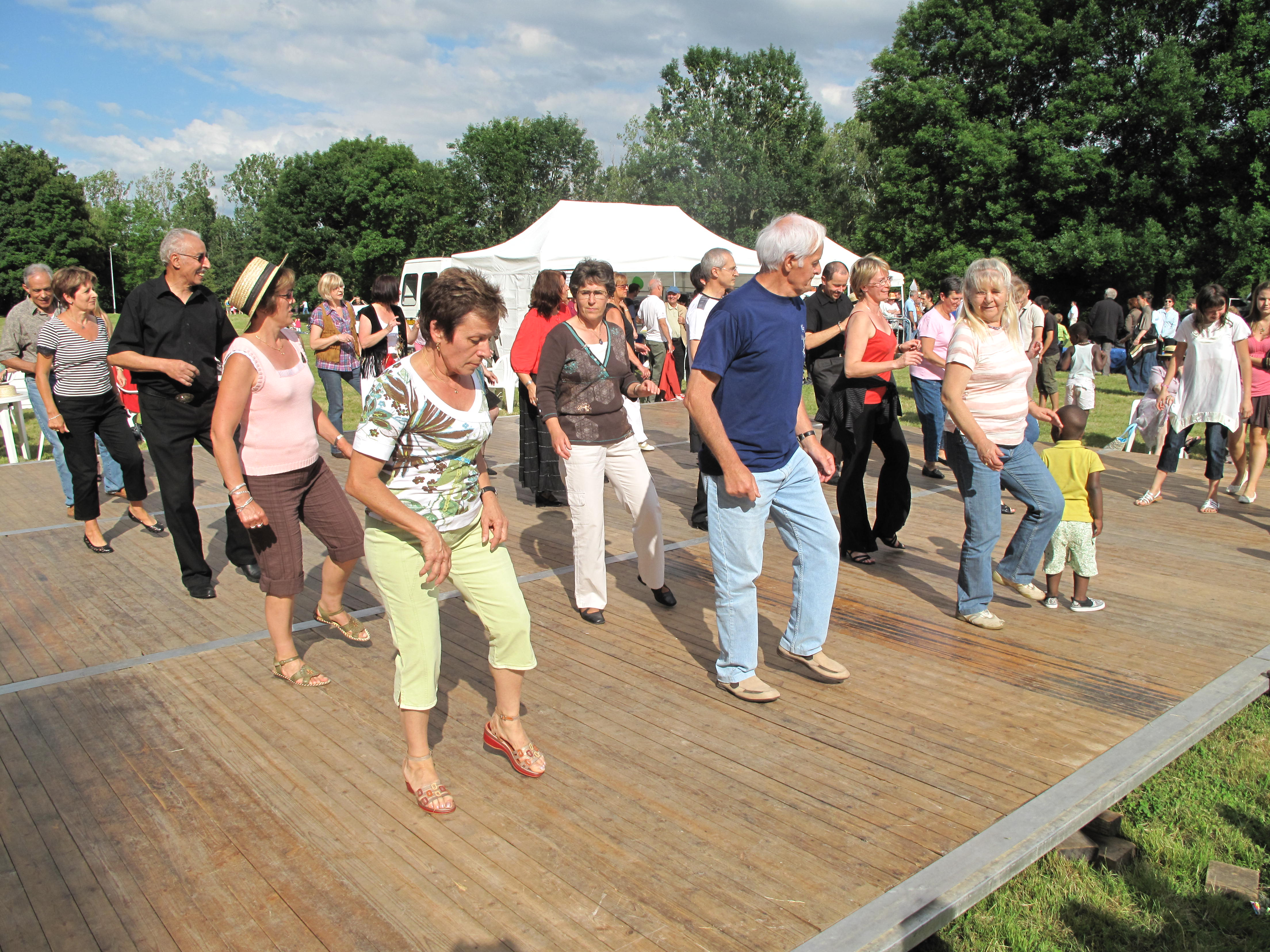
Madison line dancers taking a quarter turn.

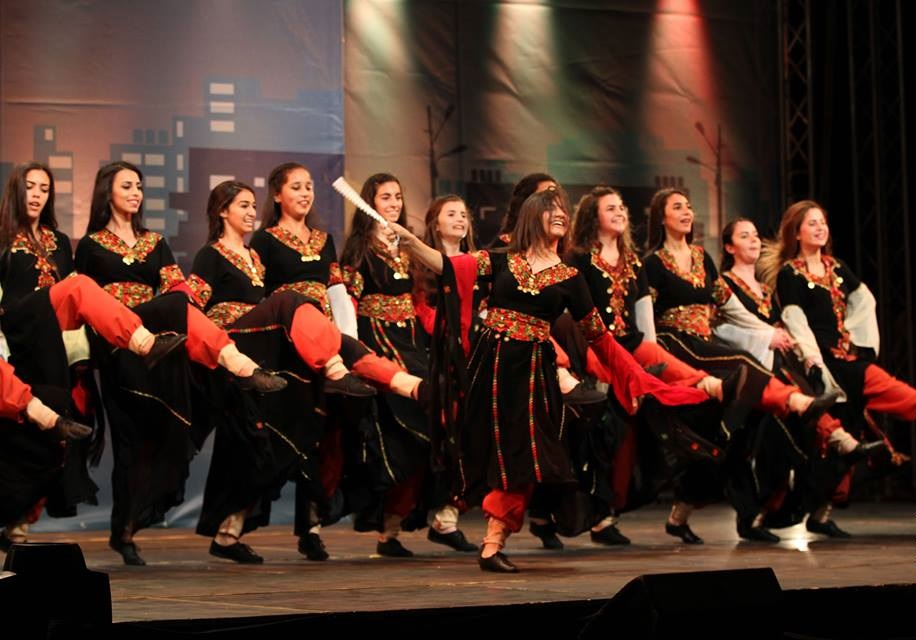
Palestinian women performing Dabke.

The precise origins of line dancing are not entirely clear. Of the confusion, music historian Christy Lane has stated that "If you were to ask 10 people with some knowledge of when line dancing began, you'd probably get 10 different answers". By and large, the growth and popularity of line dancing has mainly been tied to country and western music.

It is likely that at least some of the steps and terminology used in modern line dancing originated from the dances brought to North America by European immigrants in the 1800s. Throughout the 1860s–1890s, the style that would later be known as country–western dance began to emerge from these dances. Schools in the United States began to incorporate dancing, particularly folk dancing, into physical education classes in the 1900s, which popularized folk and country dancing as a social activity. Finally, servicemen returning from World War I and World War II sometimes brought European dances back to the United States, incorporating elements into American dance styles.

=== 1950s–1970s: development of style ===
One of the first true line dances was the Madison, a novelty dance created and first performed in Columbus, Ohio, in 1957. The dance and its accompanying record became locally popular in Baltimore, Maryland, attracting the attention of the producers of The Buddy Deane Show in 1960 and leading other dance shows to feature it. The 1961 "San Francisco Stomp" meets the definition of a line dance.

During the disco music era of the 1970s, numerous new dance styles emerged, including many line dances choreographed to disco songs. The "L.A. Hustle", a modified version of the Madison, began in a small Los Angeles disco in the summer of 1975 and reached the East Coast, with modified steps, in the spring of 1976 as the "Bus Stop". Another line dance from the 1970s is the Nutbush, performed to Tina Turner's song "Nutbush City Limits".

The Electric Slide, associated with the song "Electric Boogie", was created in 1976. "Electric Boogie", written by Bunny Wailer for Marcia Griffiths, was originally released in December 1982. It became popular in Jamaica in early 1983 and achieved moderate international success. A remixed version was released in 1989 and gained broader popularity. It reached number 51 on the Billboard Hot 100 in the United States, becoming Griffiths' most successful single and helping to popularize the Electric Slide.

The release of the film Saturday Night Fever in 1977 took disco and its associated dance styles to a new height of popularity.

Line dancing to country music also became popular during this era. Two notable dances date to 1972: the Walkin' Wazi and the Cowboy Boogie.

=== 1980s–present ===
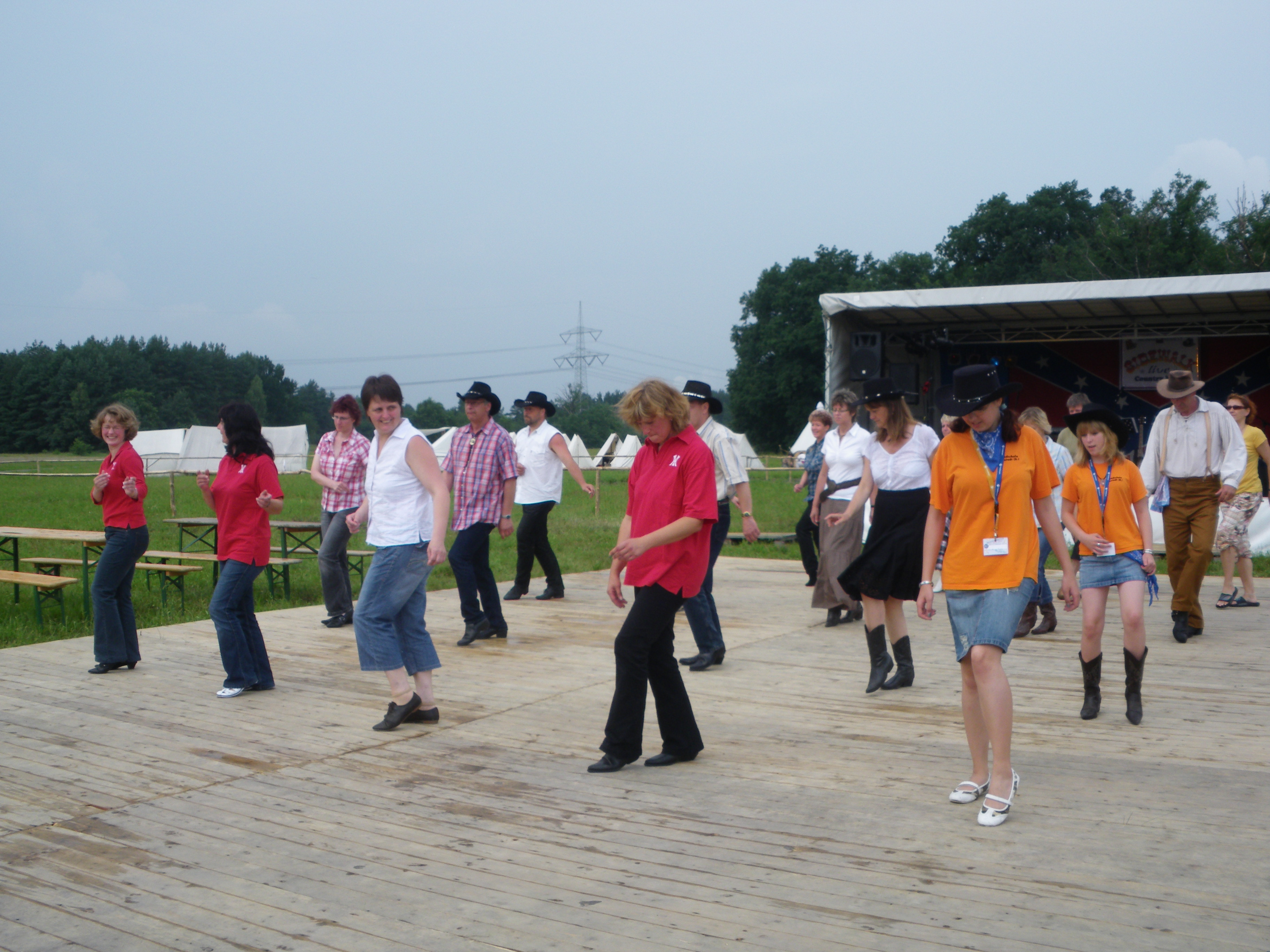
Line dancers in Neustadt on Spree, Saxony, Germany

The 1980 film Urban Cowboy caused a trend for country and western culture, particularly the associated dance, music, and clothing. Over a dozen line dances were created for country songs during the 1980s. Many other early line dances were adaptations of disco line dance. The Chicken Dance is an example of a line dance adopted by the Mod revival during the 1980s.

The music video for the 1990 Billy Ray Cyrus song "Achy Breaky Heart" has been credited for launching line dancing into the mainstream.

In the 1990s, the hit Spanish dance song "Macarena" inspired a popular line dance.

A line dance for the 1990 Asleep at the Wheel single "Boot Scootin' Boogie" was choreographed by Bill Bader. The 1992 Brooks & Dunn cover of the song has resulted in there being at least 16 line dances with "Boot Scootin' Boogie" in the title. Billy Ray Cyrus' 1992 hit "Achy Breaky Heart" helped catapult western line dancing into the mainstream public consciousness. In 1994 choreographer Max Perry had a worldwide dance hit with "Swamp Thang" for the song "Swamp Thing" by The Grid. This was a techno song that fused banjo sounds in the melody line and helped to start a trend of line dancing to forms of music other than country. In this mid-1990s period, country western music was significantly influenced by the popularity of line dancing.

Max Perry, along with Jo Thompson Szymanski, Scott Blevins and several others, began to use ballroom rhythms and technique to take line dancing to the next level. In 1997, the band Steps created further interest outside of the U.S. with the techno dance song "5,6,7,8". In 1999, American retailer Gap Inc. debuted the "Khaki Country" ad at that year's Academy Awards ceremony, in which line dancers performed to the 1999 version of "Crazy Little Thing Called Love" by Dwight Yoakam.

The arrival of the Country Music Television channel to Europe fed the popularity of line dancing there. In 2008, line dancing gained the attention of the French government.

Based on per capita ranking of MeetUp Groups in the US, Durham, N.C. was declared the line dancing capital of America in 2014.

In 2024, the Boots on the Ground song and dance was popularized.

== Wall ==
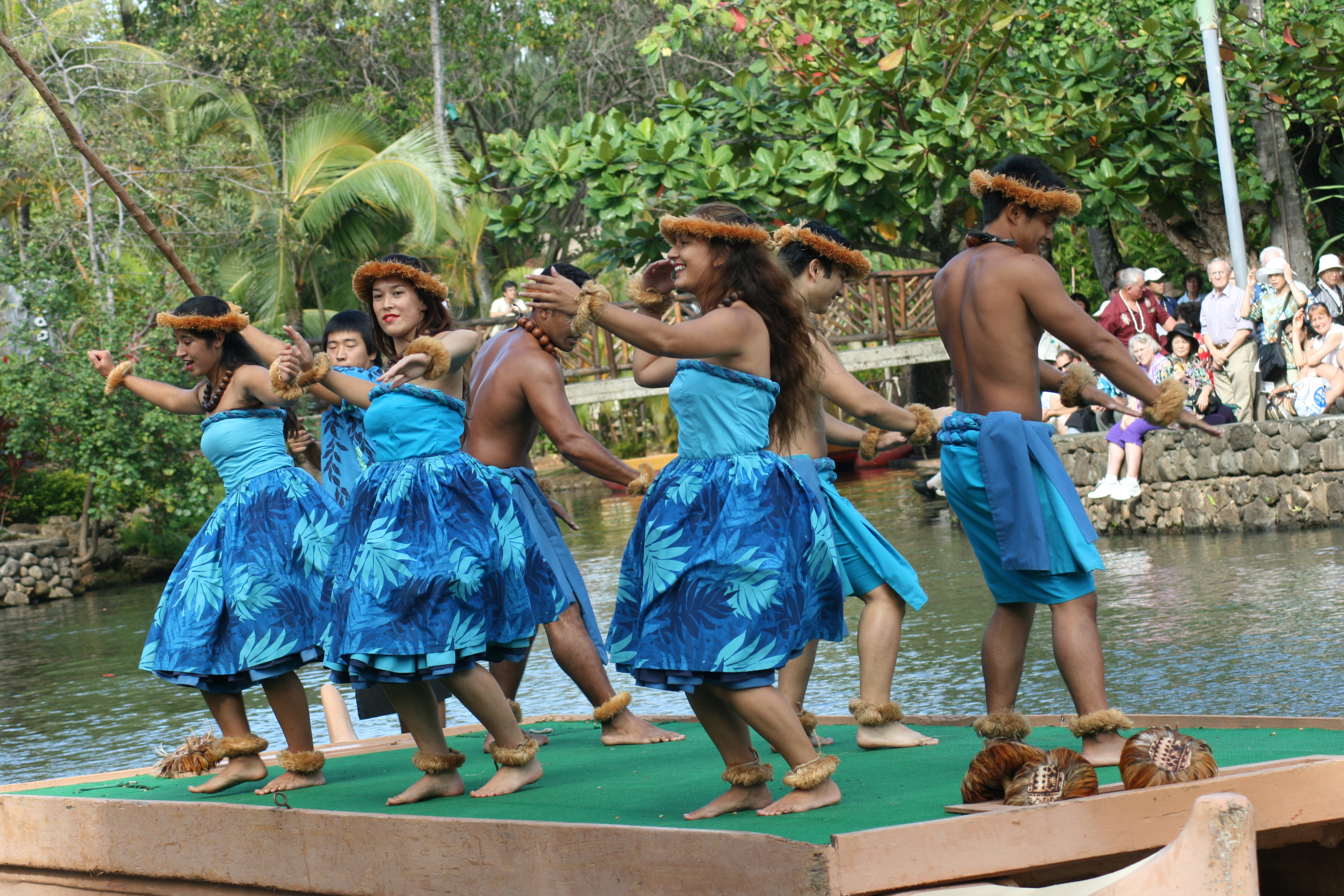
Line dancing at the Polynesian Cultural Center in Hawaii

Line dances are commonly described by their number of walls. A wall is the direction in which the dancers face at any given time: the front (the direction faced at the beginning of the dance), the back, or either side. Dancers may change direction several times during a sequence and may face a direction halfway between two walls. At the end of the sequence, they face the original wall or one of the other three. The next iteration of the sequence uses that wall as its new frame of reference.

- In a one-wall dance, the dancers face the same direction at the end of the sequence as at the beginning (either no turn or a full turn of 360 degrees).
- In a two-wall dance, repetitions of the sequence end alternately at the back and front walls. In other words, the dancers turn through 180 degrees during one set (a half turn). The samba line dance is an example of a two-wall dance. While doing the "volte" step, the dancers turn 180 degrees to face a new wall.
- In a four-wall dance, the direction faced at the end of the sequence is 90 degrees to the right or left of the direction faced at the beginning (a quarter turn). As a result, the dancers face each of the four walls in turn at the end of four consecutive repetitions of the sequence before returning to the original wall. The hustle line dance is an example of a four-wall dance because, in the final figure, the dancers turn 90 degrees to the left to face a new wall. In some dances, they turn 270 degrees (a three-quarter turn) to face the new wall.

== See also ==
- Haka
- Chorus line
