= Marcia Griffiths & Friends =

Studio album by Marcia Griffiths
- Released: October 30, 2012
- Genre: Reggae
- Label: VP Records
- Producer: Christopher Chin (exec), Donovan Germain (exec)

Marcia Griffiths & Friends is a studio album by a Jamaican reggae female singer, Marcia Griffiths, released on October 30, 2012, under VP Records. No other female vocalist has charted hits in as wide a range of styles in the genre, and the album was released as a tribute to Griffiths. Penthouse productions presents the album as a two CD collection with 38 duets recorded in collaboration with the label.

== Track listing ==
Disc 1

No.	Title	Artist	Writer(s)
1	Automatic (Keeping It Real)	Marcia Griffiths feat. Busy Signal	Alaine Laughton, Reanno Gordon
2	I See Love	Marcia Griffiths feat. Buju Banton	Clement Dodd, Mark Myrie
3	Desperate Lover	Marcia Griffiths feat. Gentleman	Keith Anderson
4	Love Is a Treasure (Remix)	Marcia Griffiths feat. Exco Levi	Clement Dodd, Manning, Freddy McKay
5	Childish Games	Marcia Griffiths feat. Buju Banton	Mark Myrie, Clement Dodd, Hugh Hammond, Marcia Griffiths
6	Dearest	Marcia Griffiths feat. Sanchez	Bob Gibson, Ellas McDaniel, Herman Prentice Polk, Jr
7	Just You and Me	Marcia Griffiths feat. Peetah Morgan	Peetah Morgan
8	Sense of Purpose	Marcia Griffiths feat. Bunny Rugs	Michael Cooper, Richard Daley, Stephen Coore, William Stewart
9	Knew You Were Waiting for Me aka I Knew You Were Waiting	Marcia Griffiths feat. Duane Stephenson	Simon Crispin Climie, Dennis W Morgan
10	When The Lights Are Low	Marcia Griffiths feat. John Holt	John Holt, Howard Barrett, Tyrone Evans
11	It's Not Too Late	Marcia Griffiths feat. Beres Hammond	Hugh Hammond
12	If You Give Me Your Heart	Marcia Griffiths feat. Freddie McGregor	James E Lewis
13	Round and Round	Marcia Griffiths feat. Queen Ifrica	Ventrice Morgan, Bunny-Ann Fletcher, Donovan Germain
14	Number One	Marcia Griffiths feat. Gregory Isaacs	Gregory Isaacs
15	Nothing's Gonna Stop Us Now	Marcia Griffiths feat. Da'Ville	Albert Louis Hammond, Diane Eve Warren
16	Riddim Affi Roll	Marcia Griffiths feat. Lady G	Annette Brissett
17	Oh No Not My Baby	Marcia Griffiths feat. Zumjay	Carole King, Gerald Goffin
18	Loving Jah aka Forever Loving Jah	Marcia Griffiths feat. Tony Rebel	Robert Nesta Marley, Patrick Barrett
19	Want Love	Marcia Griffiths feat. Tanya Stephens	Vivienne Stephenson, Lloyd Campbell

Disc 2

No.	Title	Artist	Writer(s)
1	Stand by Your Man	Marcia Griffiths feat. Assassin	Billy Sherrill, Tammy Wynette
2	If Only You Knew	Marcia Griffiths feat. Mikey Spice	Cynthia Biggs, Kenneth Gamble, Dexter Wansel
3	All My Life	Marcia Griffiths feat. Da'Ville	Karla Bonoff
4	Undying Love	Marcia Griffiths feat. Anthony B	Clement Dodd, Ernest Wilson
5	A True	Marcia Griffiths feat. Richie Stephens	Joel Gibson, Dhaima Allen
6	Woman	Marcia Griffiths feat. Lady G	Wayne Armond, Janice Fyffe, Lucien Dixon, Donovan Germain
7	Check It Out	Marcia Griffiths feat. Tony Rebel, Cutty Ranks & Buju Banton	Keith Anderson, Patrick Barrett, Phillip Thomas, Mark Myrie, Marcia Griffiths
8	Half Idiot	Marcia Griffiths feat. Cutty Ranks	Keith Anderson, Phillip Thomas
9	Things Not So Right	Marcia Griffiths feat. Tony Rebel	Keith Anderson, Clement Dodd, Patrick Barrett
10	Live On	Marcia Griffiths feat. Beres Hammond	Hugh Hammond, Clement Dodd, Marcia Griffiths
11	Closer	Marcia Griffiths feat. Buju Banton	Hugh Hammond, Mark Myrie, Clement Dodd
13	Give Me Your Loving	Marcia Griffiths feat. Cutty Ranks	Keith Anderson, Phillip Thomas
14	It's Not Funny (Cause I Got a Broken Heart)	Marcia Griffiths feat. Bunny Rugs	Bunny Sigler
15	Special Gift	Marcia Griffiths feat. Lt. Stitchie	A. Brissett, Clement Dodd, Linneth M Griffiths, Cleve Laing
16	Ebony and Ivory	Marcia Griffiths feat. Bob Andy	Paul James McCartney
17	Stepping Out A Babylon	Marcia Griffiths feat. Tony Rebel, Cobra, Beenie Man & Buju Banton	Keith Anderson, Linneth May Griffiths, Moses Davis, Errol Brown, Patrick Barrett, Mark Myrie
18	Watch Out For That	Marcia Griffiths feat. Beres Hammond	Hugh Hammond, Robert Shakespeare, Lowell Dunbar, Marcia Griffiths
19	Ready To Go	Marcia Griffiths feat. Tony Rebel	Leroy Sibbles, Earl Morgan, Barrington Llewellyn, Patrick Barrett
