= Time Will Tell: A Tribute to Bob Marley =

Studio album by Bunny Wailer
- Released: 1990
- Genre: Reggae
- Label: Shanachie
- Producer: Bunny Wailer

Professional ratings
Review scores
Source	Rating
AllMusic	4/5 stars

Time Will Tell: A Tribute to Bob Marley is an album by Bunny Wailer, released through Shanachie Records in 1990. In 1991, the album won Wailer the Grammy Award for Best Reggae Recording.

== Track listing ==
All songs by Bob Marley, unless noted otherwise.

1. "Soul Rebel"
2. "I Shot the Sheriff"
3. "Time Will Tell"
4. "Bellyfull"
5. "Redemption Song"
6. "No Woman, No Cry"
7. "Slave Driver"
8. "War"
9. "Crazy Baldhead"
10. "Rebel Music"

== Personnel ==
- Bunny Wailer – vocals, percussion
- Dwight Pinkney, Eric "Bingy Bunny" Lamont, Owen "Fox" Stewart, Radcliffe "Dougie" Bryan, Noel "Sowell" Bailey – guitar
- Robbie Shakespeare, Errol "Flabba" Holt, Daniel "Danny Axeman" Thompson, Richard Walters – bass
- Sly Dunbar, Carlton "Santa" Davis, Lincoln "Style" Scott - drums
- Keith Sterling, Wycliffe "Steely" Johnson, Tony Asher – keyboards
- "Deadly" Headley Bennett, Dean Fraser, Ronald "Nambo" Robinson – horns
- Uziah "Sticky" Thompson – percussion
- Marcia Griffiths, The Psalms – background vocals
