= Electric Boogie =

Single by Marcia Griffiths

from the album Carousel
- A-side: "Electric Boogie (vocal)"
- B-side: "Electric Boogie (dub)"
- Released: 1983 (original release); 1989 (remix)
- Recorded: December 1982 (original recording)
- Genre: Freestyle, reggae
- Label: Island / Mango
- Songwriter: Neville Livingston

"Electric Boogie" (also known as the "Electric Slide") is a dance song written by Bunny Wailer in response to his hearing the Eddy Grant song "Electric Avenue" in 1982. The song provided the basis for the success of a dance fad called Electric Slide.

According to Marcia Griffiths, "Electric Boogie" was written for her by Bunny Wailer in 1982. The song came about spontaneously after Wailer and Griffiths experimented with a rhythm box that Griffiths had purchased in Toronto earlier that year. Griffiths has said the song was made in innocent fun and has denied that it was related to anything sexual.

The song was released in December 1982 and held the Jamaican Christmas Number One spot. Wailer noted that 'Electric Boogie' was inspired by "Electric Avenue" by Eddy Grant, also released in 1982.

The song is strongly associated with the "Electric Slide" line dance and has since become a celebratory staple. The song was very popular in North America at weddings, bar and bat mitzvahs, and other special occasions in the 1990s and continues to be played at events well into the 21st century.

The song contains an interpolation of "I Don't Know What It Is, but It Sure Is Funky" by Ripple.

== Marcia Griffiths recording ==
The most successful recording was performed by Marcia Griffiths. Griffiths' recording of "Electric Boogie" was originally released in 1983; while this version did not catch on internationally, a remixed version featured on her album Carousel reached number 51 on the US Billboard Hot 100 in 1990. This version was also a minor hit on the Hot Black Singles chart, peaking at number 78.

== See also ==
- Electric boogaloo (disambiguation)
