= Hall of Fame: A Tribute to Bob Marley's 50th Anniversary =

Studio album by Bunny Wailer
- Released: November 1995
- Genre: Reggae
- Label: RAS

Hall of Fame
Review scores
Source	Rating
AllMusic	3/5 stars

Hall of Fame: A Tribute to Bob Marley's 50th Anniversary is an album by Bunny Wailer, released through RAS Records in November 1995. In 1997, the album won Wailer the Grammy Award for Best Reggae Album.

In his review for AllMusic, Bret Love says "this a great set for reggae collectors."

== Track listing ==
All songs by Bob Marley and Bunny Wailer, unless noted otherwise.

Disc 1

1. "Profile" – 0:40
2. "Roots" – 4:02
3. "Chant Down Babylon" – 3:21
4. "Forever Loving Jah" – 4:00
5. "Three Little Birds" – 3:25
6. "Trench Town" – 3:24
7. "Rastaman Vibration (PositiveVibration)" – 3:08
8. "Roots, Rock, Reggae" – 3:24
9. "Johnny Was a Good Man (Johnny Was)" – 3:02
10. "Want More" – 3:01
11. "No More Trouble" (Marley) – 3:19
12. "Africa Unite" – 2:20
13. "One Drop" – 3:27
14. "Ambush" – 2:43
15. "Wake up and Live" (Davis, Marley) – 3:32
16. "Can't Stop Them Now (Real Situation)" – 2:39
17. "Bad Card" – 3:13
18. "Mi and Dem (We and Them)" – 2:51
19. "Work" – 2:51
20. "Rasta Dread (Natty Dread)" – 3:46
21. "Bend Down Low" (Marley) – 3:22
22. "Talking Blues" – 3:43
23. "Blackman Redemption" (Marley, Perry) – 3:10
24. "Sun Is Shining" – 3:15
25. "Man to Man (Who the Cap Fit)" – 3:27

Disc 2

1. "Stiff Neck Fool" – 3:16
2. "Pimper's Paradise" – 2:26
3. "Jump Nyahbinghi" – 3:07
4. "Mix Up" – 3:11
5. "Give Thanks and Praise" – 2:51
6. "Trouble in the World (So Much Trouble)" – 3:05
7. "Zion Train" – 3:14
8. "Rastaman Rides Again (Ride Natty Ride)" – 2:47
9. "Judge Not" – 2:40
10. "Fancy Curls" – 2:32
11. "Zimbabwe" (Marley) – 3:14
12. "Winnepress (Babylon System)" – 3:06
13. "Rat Race" – 2:48
14. "Revolution" – 2:18
15. "Top Rankin'" – 2:20
16. "Rainbow Country" – 3:22
17. "Simmer Down" – 3:02
18. "Running Away" – 3:05
19. "Guiltness" – 2:55
20. "Craven Choke Puppy" – 2:32
21. "Natural Mystic" – 2:41
22. "So Much Things to Say" – 2:39
23. "Survivors (Survival)" – 1:52
24. "One Love" – 2:49
25. "Lively Up Yourself" – 4:06
26. "Small Axe" – 3:40
27. "Final Statement" – 2:59

== Personnel ==
- Carl Ayton – drums, percussion
- Barrington Bailey – horn, keyboards
- Aston Barrett – bass
- Christopher Birch – keyboards
- Winston Bowen – guitar
- Lloyd Denton – keyboards
- Sly Dunbar – drums, percussion
- Bobby Ellis – horn
- Michael Fletcher – bass
- Everton Gayle – horn
- Flabba Holt – bass
- Hugh Malcolm – drums
- Junior Marvin – guitar
- Johnny "Dizzy" Moore – horn
- Dwight Pinkney – guitar
- Owen Reid – guitar
- Mikey "Boo" Richards – drums
- Style Scott – drums
- Robbie Shakespeare – bass
- Roger Steffens – liner notes
- Keith Sterling – keyboards, percussion
- Danny Thompson – bass
- Bunny Wailer – arranger, director, keyboards, percussion, producer, vocals, backing vocals
- Mallory Williams – keyboards
- Lloyd "Gitsy" Willis – guitar
