= Libres =

Libres may refer to:

- Libres (album), an album by Sonohra
- Libres (municipality), Mexico
- Paso de los Libres, a city in Argentina

== See also ==
- Libre (disambiguation)
