= Crucial! Roots Classics =

Compilation album by Bunny Wailer
- Released: 1994
- Genre: Reggae
- Label: RAS

Professional ratings
Review scores
Source	Rating
Allmusic	3/5 stars

Crucial! Roots Classics is a compilation album by Bunny Wailer, released through RAS Records in 1994. The album collects many non-album singles from the early 1980s and also several tracks from the album 'Struggle', which has otherwise not appeared on CD.

In 1995, the album won Wailer the Grammy Award for Best Reggae Album.

== Track listing ==
All songs by Bunny Wailer.

1. "Boderation" – 3:58
2. "Baldheaded Woman" – 4:01
3. "Old Dragon" – 6:29
4. "Crucial" – 3:41
5. "Innocent Blood" – 3:25
6. "Trouble on the Road Again" – 3:25
7. "Peace Talks" – 4:38
8. "Unity" – 4:29
9. "Togawar Game" – 2:50
10. "Struggle" – 6:22
11. "Free Jah Jah Children" – 5:22
12. "Power Strugglers" – 3:36
13. "Bright Soul" – 4:10
14. "Here in Jamaica" – 3:34

Note: The original U.S. release of this album was on Shanachie Records in 1994 (Shanachie 45014). The R.A.S. release was in 2003.
