= French ship Liberté =

Eleven ships of the French Navy have borne the name Liberté, in honour of the concept of Liberty.

== Ships ==
- Liberté (1792), a felucca
- Dictateur (1782), a 74-gun Pégase-class ship of the line, was renamed to Liberté during her career
- Liberté (1793), a floating battery captured from the Dutch
- Liberté (1793), a small craft
- Liberté (1794), a brig
- Salamine (1793), a Spanish prize brig, bore the name Liberté during her French career
- Liberté (1795), a 16-gun corvette
- Liberté (1799), a corvette
- Revolver (1869), a gunboat, bore the name Liberté during her career
- Liberté (1907), a pre-dreadnought battleship, lead ship of her class (Note: or member of the République class according to Roche (vol.2, p. 308))
- Liberté (1915), an auxiliary submarine hunter

== See also ==
- French ship Libre
- Libérateur d'Italie (1797), a lugger.
- Liberté française (1800), an 8-gun bombship.

== Notes and references ==
=== Bibliography ===
- Roche, Jean-Michel (2005). Dictionnaire des bâtiments de la flotte de guerre française de Colbert à nos jours. Vol. 1. Group Retozel-Maury Millau. p. 280. ISBN 978-2-9525917-0-6. OCLC 165892922.
- Roche, Jean-Michel (2005). Dictionnaire des bâtiments de la flotte de guerre française de Colbert à nos jours. Vol. 2. Group Retozel-Maury Millau. p. 250. ISBN 978-2-9525917-0-6. OCLC 165892922.
