= Marcia Griffiths =

Jamaican singer (born 1949)

The Honourable Marcia Griffiths OJ CD
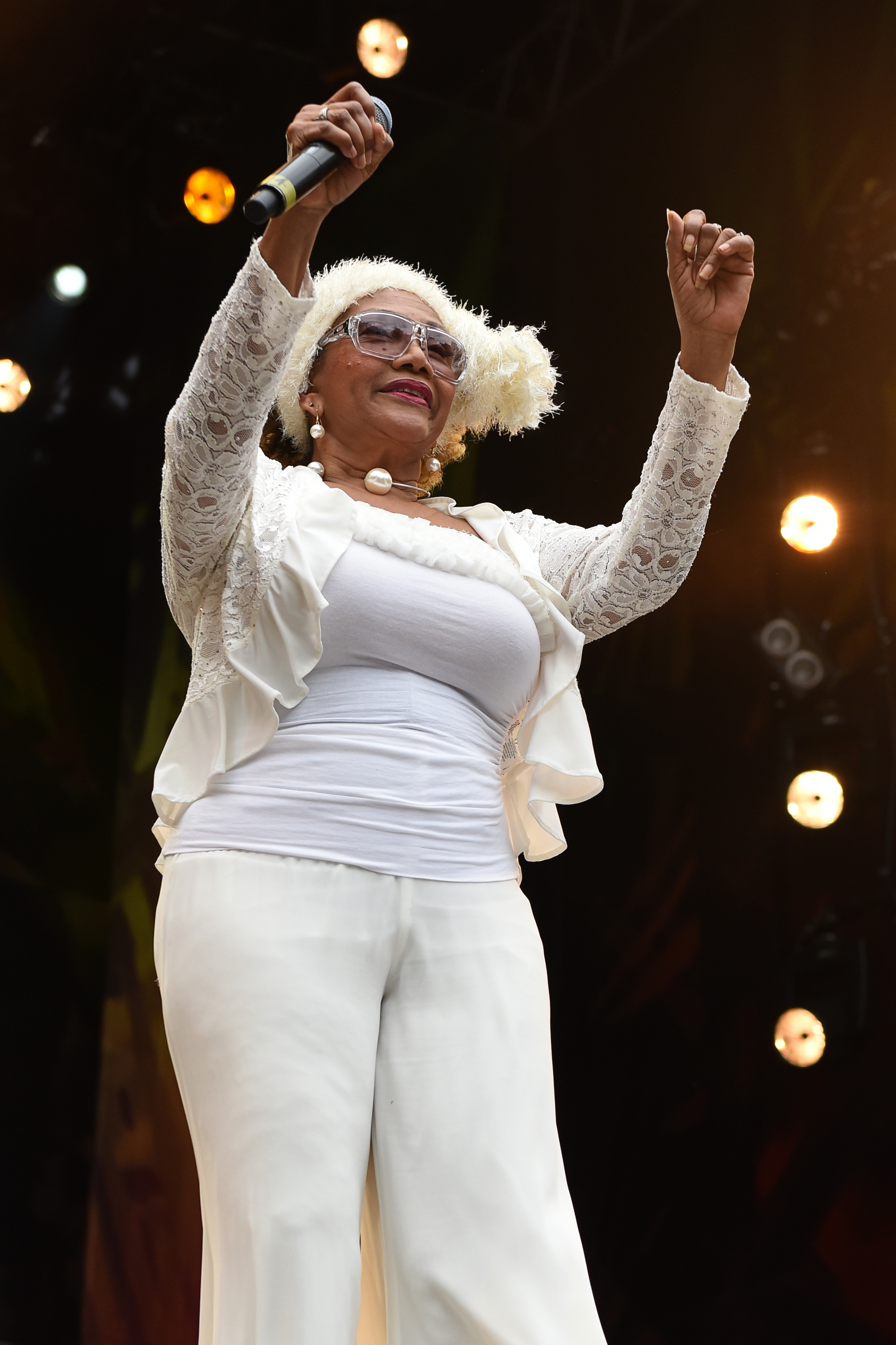
- Marcia Griffiths at Ruhr Reggae Summer 2016

Background information
- Born: Marcia Llyneth Griffiths; 23 November 1949 (age 76); Kingston, Jamaica
- Genres: Reggae, roots reggae
- Occupation: Vocalist
- Years active: 1964–present

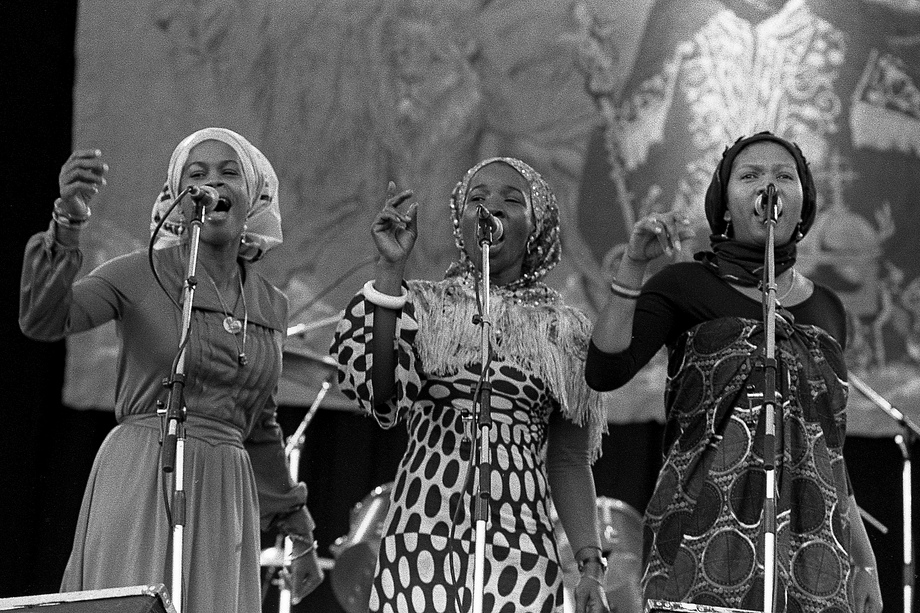
Marcia Griffiths (right) with the I Threes

Marcia Llyneth Griffiths OJ CD (born 23 November 1949) is a Jamaican singer best known for the 1989 remix of her single "Electric Boogie", which serves as the music for the four-wall "Electric Slide" line dance. It is the best-selling single of all time by a female reggae singer. She has been referred to as the "Queen of Reggae".

== Biography ==
Born in West Kingston, Jamaica, Griffiths started her career in 1964, performing on stage with Byron Lee and the Dragonaires at the behest of Phillip James of The Blues Busters, who had heard her singing in her neighbourhood. Her performance was sufficiently impressive that the following day Ronnie Nasralla and Clement Dodd both offered her recording contracts. She chose to record for Dodd's Studio One label, where she recorded a series of duets with male singers such as Tony Gregory ("You're Mine"), Bob Marley ("Oh My Darling"), Jeff Dixon ("Words"), and Bob Andy ("Always Together"), with whom she would have a relationship lasting several years. In 1968, she had her first success as a solo artist, with "Feel Like Jumping", which like her other early Studio One solo hits (including "Truly" and "Melody Life"), were written by Andy.

From 1970 to 1974, she worked with Bob Andy as a duo (Bob and Marcia), on the Harry J label. She also recorded for Lloyd Charmers.

Between 1974 and 1981, she was a member of the I Threes, a trio of backing singers that supported Bob Marley & the Wailers. She continued to record as a solo artist throughout the 1970s, working with producers such as Sonia Pottinger, and Joseph Hoo Kim.

In December 1982, Griffiths released the song "Electric Boogie", written exclusively for her by Bunny Wailer. The song came about after Wailer and Griffiths experimented with a rhythm box that Griffiths had purchased in Toronto earlier that year. Wailer noted that "Electric Boogie" was inspired by "Electric Avenue" by Eddy Grant, also released in 1982. In the first few months of 1983, the song reached the top of the charts in Jamaica.

Although the 1983 version became a minor hit for Griffiths, the song was remixed in 1989, and that version made the Electric Slide, a line dance, an international dance craze. It reached number 51 on the US Billboard Hot 100, her most successful single. It is currently the highest-selling single by a female reggae singer of all time. She had further hits with producer Donovan Germain. Griffiths was featured on the album True Love by Toots and the Maytals, which won the Grammy Award in 2004 for Best Reggae Album, and showcased many notable musicians including Willie Nelson, Eric Clapton, Jeff Beck, Trey Anastasio, Gwen Stefani / No Doubt, Ben Harper, Bonnie Raitt, Manu Chao, The Roots, Ryan Adams, Keith Richards, Toots Hibbert, Paul Douglas, Jackie Jackson, Ken Boothe, and The Skatalites.

Griffiths appeared in the 2011 documentary Reggae Got Soul: The Story of Toots and the Maytals, which was featured on BBC and described as "The untold story of one of the most influential artists ever to come out of Jamaica".

A Brazilian documentary film about Griffiths, Reggae Meets Samba, was in production as of December 2013.

In January 2014, she announced that as part of her fiftieth year in the music business, she would release an album of her favorite songs by other artists, Songs That Inspire Me, Songs I Love to Sing, recorded with Germain.

In January 2018, Griffiths signed an exclusive booking deal with New York-based Donsome Records' booking agency.

== Personal life ==
Griffiths had two children with JBC disc jockey Errol Thompson, and raised them alone after his death in 1983.

== Honors ==
In August 2014, it was announced that Griffiths would receive the Jamaican Order of Distinction (Commander class) in October that year.

In October 2023, Griffiths was conferred with the Order of Jamaica (OJ) Jamaica’s fourth-highest national honour.

== Discography ==
=== Albums ===
- Sweet Bitter Love (1974)
- Naturally (1978)
- Steppin (1979)
- Rock My Soul (1984)
- Marcia (1988)
- Carousel (1990)
- Indomitable (1995)
- Land of Love (1997)
- Collectors Series (1998)
- Truly (1998)
- Certified (1999)
- Reggae Max (2003)
- Shining Time (2005)
- Melody Life (2007)
- Marcia Griffiths & Friends (2012)
- Timeless (2019)
