= Simon Vumbaca =

Sports personality and lawyer

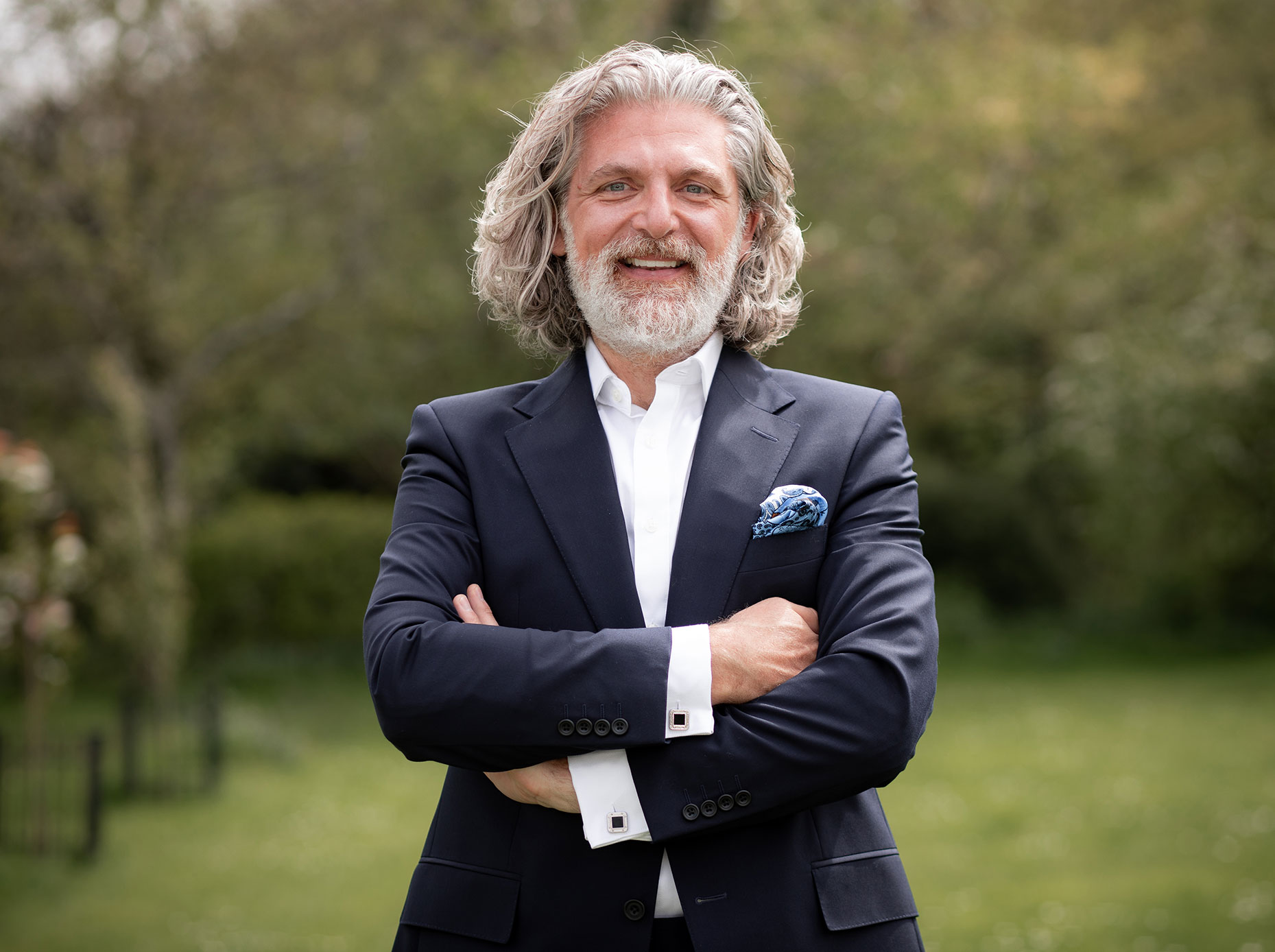
- Education: Université Panthéon Assas (Paris II), Regent's University London
- Occupations: Strategy, special affairs, investment/ private equity – advisor – solicitor and international lawyer, music producer
- Title: Principle of ASV Private Office; Director of strategy and investment Evok Ventures; Board member Sunderland
- Website: asvpo.com simonvumbaca.com

Simon Vumbaca is the principal of London-based private investment office ASV Private Office. Previously a dual-qualified lawyer, Vumbaca is a motorsports personality, non-executive director for Sunderland and formerly the British Basketball League (BBL). He was a CEO and co-founder of Pit Stop Betting until 2019, when he sold the company. He represents the Bahrain International Circuit in its negotiations in motorsports and also represented Saudi Arabia in the deal that brought Formula 1 to the Jeddah Corniche Circuit Jeddah, Saudi Arabia. Vumbaca is also the owner of music production company Firesound Music.

== Career ==
=== ASV Private Office ===
After selling ASV Law in 2020, Vumbaca launched a new private investment firm under the name ASV Private Office. The firm has a particular focus on the sports, entertainment, infrastructure, energy, technology and healthcare sectors. In a press release, the firm stated its goals are to "reimagine the private investment model".

=== ASV Law ===
In 2011, Vumbaca established ASV Law, an international law firm based in Knightsbridge, London. It specialises in delivering corporate, commercial and litigation advice.

Notably, Vumbaca has worked with: the FIA, FIM, Formula One circuits and teams, Moto GP, football clubs and players, high-profile athletes including Pietro Sibello and Kriss Akabusi, and notable musicians and TV personalities including Bunny Wailer and Melanie Sykes.

In 2018, Vumbaca and ASV Law represented Madrox partners in the purchase of Sunderland from Ellis Short for £40 million, after back-to-back relegations saw the club plummet from the Premier League down to the third-tier.

=== Awards ===
Vumbaca has been published and is the recipient of multiple awards for his work in law which are detailed below:

Awards
AI 2020 Leading Advisor Awards – Leading complex cross-border Litigation and Arbitration Lawyer of the Year and Arbitration Lawyer of the Year
Advisory Excellence 2020 – Certificate of Excellence
Corporate NTL 2020 Litigation Law Firm of the Year, England
Spears500 – Top Recommended 2020
Global Law Experts 2021 Recommended Experts
Global Law Experts 2021 Recommended Law Firm

== Involvement in sports ==
=== Motorsports ===
Vumbaca is the co-founder of Pit Stop Betting which was unveiled by the Motorsports Network in 2018. In October 2018, Pit Stop Betting was named the official betting partner of the UK's racing series, the Bennets British Superbike championship. Vumbaca went on to sell the company in 2019.

Vumbaca was retained since 2010 by the Bahrain International Circuit to represent the international company as a whole in its negotiations in Formula 1 and other international series, such as WEC and the like. Vumbaca also represented Saudi Arabia in the deal that brought Formula 1 to the Jeddah Corniche Circuit Jeddah, Saudi Arabia.

=== Sunderland AFC ===
On May 6, 2021, Sunderland announced a quartet of new board members including Vumbaca, Juan Sartori, Steve Davison and Maurice Louis-Dreyfus. Vumbaca is currently non-executive Director at Sunderland.

In a statement, Sunderland announced that Vumbaca would "support SAFC's existing executive team in carrying out the clubs long-term strategic objectives on and off the pitch, whilst further strengthening and undepinning the foundations put in place throughout the first part of 2021."

Sunderland returned to the Championship, following their successful play-off campaign in May 2022. They enjoyed an 18-game unbeaten run spanning over six months.

=== British Basketball League ===
Vumbaca has been a trustee and executive committee member of the British Basketball League. Following long time BBL chairman Paul Blake's decision to step down in 2013, Vumbaca joined Ed Percival as a member of the executive committee. Vumbaca commented that he was "delighted to have been asked to continue assisting the BBL in its continued development and it is with great pleasure that I accepted the position". Vumbaca has also sat as head of appeals for the BBL appeal panel.

=== Sailboat Racing ===
Vumbaca is a passionate sailboat racer, having competed in the 2023 Rolex Fastnet Race, a biennial yacht race, which is the world's largest offshore race.

== Music ==
=== Firesound Music ===
Vumbaca is the owner of Firesound Music specialising in music production, publication and promotion. The company represents Naki Wailer. Recently Firesound partnered with Naki Wailer to produce "Follow the Leader", co-produced by Naki Wailer himself, along with guitarist Earl "Chinna" Smith, Simone "Chuka" Simpson, and Simon Vumbaca.

== YouTube Career ==
=== The Contemplationist ===
Alongside his legal and business work, Vumbaca publishes philosophical content under the name The Contemplationist, via his personal website and a YouTube channel of the same name. The platform explores themes including ethics, technology, leadership and human emotional life - among them love, lust and loneliness - approached through a framework he terms "contemplationism". Vumbaca has also produced a podcast, The Contemplationist Insights, and has given talks and interviews on these themes, including an appearance on Italian radio station, Radio RSN. The Contemplationist helps people on their journey to think clearer and live better.
