= Liberia (disambiguation) =

Liberia is a country in Africa.

Liberia may also refer to:

- Liberia, Costa Rica, a district in Liberia canton, and a city of Guanacaste province, Costa Rica
- Liberia (canton), a canton in Guanacaste province, Costa Rica
- Liberia (cycling team), a professional cycling team that existed from 1954 to 1962
- Liberia (Manassas, Virginia), a historic house in Virginia, United States
- The African Repository, later titled Liberia in 1892
