= French ship Libre =

Two ships of the French Navy have borne the name Libre, in honour of the concept of Liberty.

== Ships ==
- Libre (1798), a barge
- Libre (1798), a Romaine-class frigate

== See also ==
- French ship Liberté
- Libérateur d'Italie (1797), a lugger.
- Liberté française (1800), an 8-gun bombship.

== Notes and references ==
=== Bibliography ===
- Roche, Jean-Michel (2005). Dictionnaire des bâtiments de la flotte de guerre française de Colbert à nos jours. Vol. 1. Group Retozel-Maury Millau. p. 280. ISBN 978-2-9525917-0-6. OCLC 165892922.
