= Tahrir =

Taḥrīr, Arabic: تحرير is a word of Arabic origin, meaning liberation.

Uses of Tahrir include:

- at-Tahrir (1959–1963) daily newspaper of the National Union of Popular Forces in Morocco
- Al Tahrir - an Egyptian daily
- Tahrir al-Wasilah - a book authored by Ayatollah Khomeini
- Tahrir Square - major public square in Cairo (also in Baghdad)
- Tahrir Square Development - Proposed first phase in Baghdad Renaissance Plan; Liberation Square is Baghdad's biggest and most central square

Organization names using Tahrir include:

- Afwaj al-Tahrir. Battalion de la Liberation (BL) in French. Liberation Battalion was a small, shadowy terrorist organization dedicated to attacking Syrian Army forces in Lebanon during the mid-late 1980s
- Al Tahrir is an Eritrean football club
- Fatah is a reverse acronym Fatḥ (or Fatah) of ḥarakat al-taḥrīr al-waṭanī al-filasṭīnī, meaning the "Palestinian National Liberation Movement"; Fatah is the largest faction of the Palestine Liberation Organization (PLO)
- Haraka Tahrir Sudan - The Sudan Liberation Movement/Army (Arabic: حركة تحرير السودانḥarakat taḥrīr as-Sūdan) (abbreviated as either SLM or SLA) is a Sudanese rebel group
- Harakat Tahrir - Liberation Movement to work for the independence of Western Sahara
- Harakit al-Taḥrīr al-Watani Al-Ahwazi, National Liberation Movement of Ahwaz (NLMA), is an organization calling for a free independent Arab State called Ahwaz
- Hizb ut-Tahrir - an international pan-Islamist and fundamentalist political organisation whose goal is for all Muslim countries to unify as a caliphate ruled by Islamic law
- Jabhat al-Tahrir al-Lubnaniyya. Front de Liberation Libanais (FLL) in French. Lebanese Liberation Front (LLF) was a mainly Christian underground terrorist group formed in 1987
- Jabhat at-Taḥrīr al-Waţanī. Front de Libération Nationale (FLN). National Liberation Front (Algeria) is a socialist political party
- Jayshu-t-tahrīr. The Army of Liberation (French : Armée de Libération). Moroccan Army of Liberation was a force fighting for the independence of Morocco in the late 1950s; also transliterated Jaish
- Kutla al-Musalaha wa't-Tahrir. Reconciliation and Liberation Bloc is a Sunni, liberal, and secularist Iraqi political party
- Munaẓẓamat al-Taḥrīr al-Filasṭīniyyat - the Palestine Liberation Organization
- Tahrir al-Sham, a Sunni Islamist political and armed organisation involved in the Syrian Civil War
- Tahrir Institute for Middle East Policy, Washington, D.C.

Other place names using Tahrir include:

- At Tahrir District is a district in Sana'a, Yemen

Other uses of Tahrir include:

- Wisam Al-Tahrir (Arabic: وسام التحرير) (Liberation Medal) - Kuwait Liberation Medal (Kuwait) issued by the government of Kuwait
- Tahrir defterleri were tax registers developed in the Ottoman Empire.
- Tahrir (vocal technique) is a form used in Persian classical singing.

== See also ==
- Tahrir Square (disambiguation)
