= Liberationist =

Liberationist may refer to:

- An advocate of liberation or a liberation movement, such as:
  - Abolition of serfdom and slavery
  - Proletarian liberation
  - Racial liberation
  - Sexual liberation
  - Women's liberation
  - Men's liberation
  - Gay liberation
  - Animal liberation
- Liberation psychology, an approach to psychology focusing on countering oppression
- Liberation theology, an approach to theology focusing on countering oppression
- In the 19th century, an advocate of Church of England disestablishment

== See also ==
- Liberation (disambiguation)
