= Jiefang =

Jiefang, generally a spelling without tonemarks of Jiěfàng (Chinese: 解放; lit. 'liberation'), may refer to:

- Jiefang Daily, newspaper of the Shanghai committee of the Chinese Communist Party
- FAW Jiefang, a truck manufacturing company
  - Jiefang CA-30, military truck
- the Chinese Communist Revolution, common known in China as the “liberation”

== People ==
Jiefang is the Pinyin romanisation of various Chinese given names, including Jiěfàng (解放) and Jiéfāng (潔芳). People with these names include:

- Sheryl WuDunn (伍潔芳; Wǔ Jiéfāng), American business executive and writer
- Eryue He (凌解放; Líng Jiěfàng), Chinese historical fiction writer

== Locations in China ==
- Jiefang Bridge, in Guangzhou
- Jiefang District, Jiaozuo, Henan

=== Townships ===
- Jiefang Township, Chizhou, in Guichi District, Chizhou, Anhui
- Jiefang Township, Yi'an County, in Yi'an County, Heilongjiang

=== Subdistricts ===
- Jiefang Subdistrict, Bengbu, in Longzihu District, Bengbu, Anhui
- Jiefang Subdistrict, Zhanjiang, in Xiashan District, Zhanjiang, Guangdong
- Jiefang Subdistrict, Liuzhou, in Liubei District, Liuzhou, Guangxi
- Jiefang Subdistrict, Botou, Hebei
- Jiefang Subdistrict, Hegang, in Gongnong District, Hegang, Heilongjiang
- Jiefang Subdistrict, Bayannur, in Linhe District, Bayannur, Inner Mongolia
- Jiefang Subdistrict, Ganzhou, in Zhanggong District, Ganzhou, Jiangxi
- Jiefang Subdistrict, Weinan, in Linwei District, Weinan, Shaanxi
- Jiefang Subdistrict, Jiaxing, in Nanhu District, Jiaxing, Zhejiang
- Jiefang Subdistrict, Zhoushan, in Dinghai District, Zhoushan, Zhejiang
- Jiefang Road Subdistrict, Anyang, in Beiguan District, Anyang, Henan
- Jiefang Road Subdistrict, Xinxiang, in Weibin District, Xinxiang, Henan
- Jiefang Road Subdistrict, Zhengzhou, in Erqi District, Zhengzhou, Henan
- Jiefang Road Subdistrict, Jingzhou, in Shashi District, Jingzhou, Hubei
- Jiefang Road Subdistrict, Changsha, in Furong District, Changsha, Hunan
- Jiefang Road Subdistrict, Ma'anshan, in Huashan District, Ma'anshan, Jiangsu
- Jiefang Road Subdistrict, Jinan, in Lixia District, Jinan, Shandong
- Jiefang Road Subdistrict, Linfen, in Yaodu District, Linfen, Shanxi
- Jiefang Road Subdistrict, Tianjin, in Binhai New Area, Tianjin
- Jiefang Road Subdistrict, Altay, in Altay City, Xinjiang
- Jiefang Road Subdistrict, Yining, in Yining City, Xinjiang

== Other uses ==
- China Railways JF, a class of steam locomotives
