= Neville Garrick =

Jamaican-American artist (1950–2023)

- Born: Kenneth Neville Anthony Garrick; 28 July 1950; Colony of Jamaica
- Died: 14 November 2023 (aged 73); California, US
- Education: UCLA
- Known for: Visual artist, photographer, author, film producer
- Movement: Reggae
- Children: 3

Kenneth Neville Anthony Garrick (28 July 1950 – 14 November 2023) was a Jamaican graphic artist and photographer who was based in Los Angeles. He was a graduate of the University of California, Los Angeles (UCLA). He is best known as Bob Marley's art director and is responsible for many of the iconic designs associated with the reggae movement in the 1970s and 1980s.

== Early life and career ==
Kenneth Neville Anthony Garrick was born in Jamaica on 28 July 1950. He attended Kingston College in Jamaica before studying graphic art (after switching from economics) at the University of California, Los Angeles (UCLA), on a football scholarship, where he played for the UCLA Bruins men's soccer team, reaching the National Collegiate Athletic Association finals in both 1971 and 1972. During his time at UCLA, Garrick edited the Black student daily Nommo, contributing to the design of the cover as well as political posters. In 1970, Garrick together with six other art students created The Black Experience mural, including depictions of abolitionists Frederick Douglass and Harriet Tubman, as well prominent figures in the civil rights era including Martin Luther King Jr., Malcolm X, Bobby Seale, Huey P. Newton, Muhammad Ali, and Angela Davis. The mural, located in the Ackerman Student Union building, was restored in 2013. Garrick was a member of the Southern California Chapter of the Black Panthers and a student of Angela Davis at UCLA.

After returning to Jamaica, he became the art director for the Jamaica Daily News from 1973 to 1974. In 1974, Garrick became the art director for the record label Tuff Gong, creating artwork for Bob Marley and the Wailers. His first album cover art for Rastaman Vibration was ranked number 22 in Billboard's 2023 list of 100 best album covers of all time. Other Marley album covers designed by Garrick include Exodus, Uprising, and the posthumously released Confrontation. As Marley's art director, Garrick helped to shape the visual representation of the reggae movement, with his art embodying the essence of the genre. Garrick designed the stage backdrops and lighting for Marley's concert tours and for the Reggae Sunsplash festival for much of the 1980s. During his career, Garrick also contributed artwork for Peter Tosh, Bunny Wailer, Jimmy Cliff, Burning Spear, Steel Pulse, and many others.

In 1986, Garrick co-founded the Bob Marley Museum in Kingston and served as its executive director. He was the author of A Rasta's Pilgrimage: Ethiopian Faces and Places (1999), and co-producer of the 1992 film Time Will Tell, which featured taped interviews from Bob Marley.

== Death ==
Garrick died from cancer in California on 14 November 2023, at age 73.

== Awards and honours ==
- 2005 – Prime Minister's Award for Excellence
- 2022 – Jamaica Reggae Industry Association (JaRIA) Gregory Isaacs Foundation award.
- 2023 – Jamaica's Order of Distinction in the Rank of Commander (CD).
