= Libre (Sébastien Izambard album) =

Studio album by Sébastien Izambard
- Released: 13 October 2000
- Genre: Pop
- Length: 44
- Label: EMI Music France
- Producer: Lionel Florence

Singles from Il Divo
- 1. "Libre"; 2. "Si Tu Savais"

Libre (Free) is the first album recorded by pop singer and present member of the quartet Il Divo, Sébastien Izambard. It was released on October 13, 2000. The album contains eleven pop songs in French.

== Track listing ==
No.	Title	Writer(s)	Music	Length
1.	"Echec à la dame"	Fab Fab and V.Baguian	Sébastien Izambard & Lionel Tridon	3:40
2.	"Libre"	Lionel Florence	Sébastien Izambard	4:14
3.	"Même si vivre"	Lionel Florence	Sébastien Izambard e Lionel Tridon	4:!1
4.	"Un Coin D'Enfance"	Lionel Florence	Sébastien Izambard	3:15
5.	"J't'en Veux"	Lionel Florence	Sébastien Izambard	3:50
6.	"Si Tu Savais"	Lionel Florence	Sébastien Izambard	3:40
7.	"Loin D'hier"	Lionel Florence	Sébastien Izambard	2:51
8.	"C'est un Mystère"	Christophe Bardy	J-P Taïeb	4:37
9.	"Danse"	Christophe Bardy	Sébastien Izambard e Lionel Tridon	3:26
10.	"Dangereuse"	Christophe Bardy	Sébastien Izambard e Lionel Tridon	4:27
11.	"Dis-le quand même"	Lionel Florence	Sébastien Izambard	3:24

== See also ==
- Le Petit Prince
