= Libre Computer Project =

Effort initiated by Shenzhen Libre Technology Co., Ltd."

- Founded at: Shenzhen, Guangdong Province, China
- Headquarters: 634, Tian Hui Building #B, You Song Lu, Long Hua District, Shenzhen 511700
- Location: Shenzhen, Guangdong Province, China
- Fields: Computer science
- Website: libre.computer

The Libre Computer Project is an effort initiated by Shenzhen Libre Technology Co., Ltd., with the goal of producing standards-compliant single-board computers (SBC) and upstream software stack to power them.

== Hardware ==
Libre Computer Project uses crowd-funding on Indiegogo and Kickstarter to market their SBC designs. The delivery and after-sales support was poor resulting in lots of complaints and dissatisfied funders.

Active Libre Computer SBC designs include:

=== ROC-RK3328-CC (Renegade) ===
The ROC-RK3328-CC "Renegade" board was funded on Indiegogo and features the following specifications:

- Rockchip RK3328 SoC
  - 4 ARM Cortex-A53 @ 1.4GHz
    - Cryptography Extensions
  - 2G + 2P ARM Mali-450 @ 500MHz
    - OpenGL ES 1.1 / 2.0
    - OpenVG 1.1
  - Multi-Media Processor
    - Decoders
      - VP9 P2 4K60
      - H.265 M10P @ L5.1 4K60
      - H.264 H10P @ L5.1 4K60
      - JPEG
    - Encoders
      - H.265 1080P30 or 2x H.264 720P30
      - H.264 1080P30 or 2x H.264 720P30
- Up to 4GB DDR4-2133 SDRAM
- 2 USB 2.0 Type A
- 1 USB 3.0 Type A
- Gigabit Ethernet
- 3.5mm TRRS AV Jack
- HDMI 2.0
- MicroUSB Power In
- MicroSD card Slot with UHS support
- eMMC Interface with 5.x support
- IR Receiver
- U-Boot Button
- 40 Pin Low Speed Header (PWM, I2C, SPI, GPIO)
- ADC Header
- Power Enable/On Header

=== AML-S905X-CC (Le Potato) ===
The AML-S905X-CC "Le Potato" board was funded on Kickstarter on 24 July 2017 and features the following specifications:

- Amlogic S905X SoC
  - 4 ARM Cortex-A53 @ 1.512GHz
    - Cryptography Extension
  - 2G + 3P ARM Mali-450 @ 750MHz
    - OpenGL ES 1.1 / 2.0
    - OpenVG 1.1
  - Amlogic Video Engine 10
    - Decoders
      - VP9 P2 4K60
      - H.265 MP10@L5.1 4K60
      - H.264 HP@L5.1 4K30
      - JPEG / MJPEG
    - Encoders
      - H.264 1080P60
      - JPEG
- Up to 2GB DDR3 SDRAM
- 4 USB 2.0 Type A
- 100 Mb Fast Ethernet
- 3.5mm TRRS AV Jack
- HDMI 2.0
- MicroUSB Power In
- MicroSD card Slot
- eMMC Interface
- IR Receiver
- U-Boot Button
- 40 Pin Low Speed Header (PWM, I2C, SPI, GPIO)
- Audio Headers (I2S, ADC, SPDIF)
- UART Header

NOTE: GPIO Header Pin 11 or HDMI CEC is selectable by onboard jumper. They can not be used at the same time since they share the same pad.

=== ALL-H3-CC (Tritium) ===
The "Tritium" board was funded on Kickstarter on 13 January 2018 with the following specifications:

Variant	ALL-H3-CC H2+ 512MB IoT	ALL-H3-CC H3 1GB	ALL-H3-CC H5 2GB
CPU	4 ARM Cortex-A7	4 ARM Cortex-A7	4 ARM Cortex-A53 Crypto
GPU	1G + 2P ARM Mali-400 OpenGL ES 1.1, 2.0 OpenVG 1.1	1G + 2P ARM Mali-400 OpenGL ES 1.1, 2.0 OpenVG 1.1	2G + 4P ARM Mali-450 OpenGL ES 1.1, 2.0 OpenVG 1.1
VPU	Allwinner Display Engine 2.0 Decoders: VP8 1080P60; H.265 4K30/1080P60; H.264 1080P60; JPEG–MJPEG 1080P30; Encoders: H.264 1080P30		
RAM	512MB DDR3-1600 (1333MHz Effective)	1GB DDR3-1600 (1333MHz Effective)	2GB DDR3-1600 (1333MHz Effective)
USB	4 USB 2.0 Type A		
Network	100 Mb Fast Ethernet		
Video Out	HDMI 1.4 (1080P) HDCP 1.2 3.5mm TRRS AV Jack		HDMI 1.4 (4K30) HDCP 1.2 3.5mm TRRS AV Jack
Storage	MicroSD card slot eMMC 4.x Interface		
IR	Receive		
Other	U-Boot Button 40 Pin Low Speed Header (PWM, I2C, SPI, GPIO) UART Header		
Recommended use	Optimized compute intensive IoT edge applications	Cost-centric open embedded Development platform	Advanced 64-bit Development platform

== Software ==
=== Operating systems ===
Name	Focus	Kernel	User space	ROC-RK3328-CC	AML-S905X-CC	ALL-H3-CC
Ubuntu	Desktop, server	Linux	GNU/Debian	Yes	Yes	Yes
Armbian	Desktop, server	Linux	GNU/Debian	Yes	Yes	Yes
Kali Linux	Penetration testing	Linux	GNU/Debian	No	No	No
Volumio	Audio web server	Linux	GNU/Debian	No	No	No
Retropie	Gaming	Linux	GNU/Debian	No	Yes	No
Happi	Gaming	Linux	GNU/Debian	No	No	No
Android	Mobile/HTPC	Linux	Android	Yes	Yes	Yes
LibreELEC	HTPC	Linux	Kodi	No	Yes	No
Arch Linux	Desktop, server	Linux	GNU/Arch	No	No	No
Rune Audio	Audio web server	Linux	GNU/Arch	No	No	No
Lakka	Gaming	Linux	GNU/Arch	No	Yes	No
Fedora	Desktop, server	Linux	GNU/Fedora	No	No	No
Void Linux	Desktop, server	Linux	GNU	No	No	No
NetBSD	Desktop, server	BSD	BSD	No	No	No
Genode	OS Framework	base-hw	Genode	No	No	No
Batocera Linux	Gaming	Linux	GNU/Arch	No	No	No

== Open source ==
=== Software ===
Libre Computer is focused on upstream support in open-source software using standardized API interfaces. This includes Linux, u-boot, LibreELEC RetroArch, and more. A variety of open-source operating systems may be used on Libre Computer boards, including Linux and Android. Few to no binary blobs are used to boot and operate the boards.

=== Hardware ===
Schematics and 2D silkscreen are available for all hardware. Design files are based on non-disclosure materials from SoC vendors. CAD files are not available.

== See also ==
- List of open-source hardware projects
- OLinuXino
- BeagleBoard
- Raspberry Pi
