= Libra =

Libra generally refers to:

- Libra (constellation), a constellation
- Libra (astrology), an astrological sign based on the star constellation

Libra may also refer to:

== Arts and entertainment ==
- Libra (novel), a 1988 novel by Don DeLillo

=== Music ===
- Libra (Gary Bartz album), 1968
- Libra (Julio Iglesias album), 1985
- Libra (Lali album), 2020
- Libra (Toni Braxton album), 2005
- The L.I.B.R.A., 2020 album by T.I.

=== Fictional entities ===
- Libra Dohko, a manga Saint Seiya character
- Libra (Marvel Comics), Gustav Brandt, the character most commonly associated with the name
- Libra (DC Comics), a DC Comics villain who is one of the leading characters in Final Crisis

== Organizations ==
- Libra Association, an oversight body for the digital currency Diem
- Libra Group, a multinational conglomerate business based in New York and London
- LIBRA, a former Croatian liberal democratic political party that is now part of the Croatian People's Party – Liberal Democrats
- Libra Party, an Albanian political party
- Libra Foundation, a charitable organization in Maine, US

== Science and technology ==
- Libra (skipper), a genus of skippers in the family Hesperiidae
- Libra (Academic Search), a public search engine for academic papers and literature
- Libra (weight), an ancient Roman unit of weight
  - Carolingian pound (Latin: libra), a unit of weight and coinage based on the Roman unit
- Diem (digital currency), formerly Libra, a cryptocurrency project initiated by Facebook
- Libra (Chinese astronomy)
- $Libra, a meme coin that caused a political scandal in Argentina in 2025

== Other uses ==
- Libra oil field, a giant oil field off the coast of Brazil
- Libra, the brand name in Australia of Libresse feminine hygiene products
- Marco Libra (born 2008), Venezuelan footballer

== See also ==
- Libras (Portuguese: Língua Brasileira de Sinais), Brazilian Sign Language
- Libre (disambiguation)
