= Liberation (Bunny Wailer album) =

Studio album by Bunny Wailer
- Released: 1989
- Recorded: 1987–1989
- Studios: Dynamic, Kingston, Jamaica
- Genre: Reggae
- Label: Shanachie
- Producer: Bunny Wailer

Bunny Wailer chronology
Rootsman Skanking (1987)	Liberation (1989)	Gumption (1990)

Liberation is an album by the Jamaican musician Bunny Wailer, released in 1989 through Shanachie Records. Wailer supported the album with a North American tour. It was nominated for a Grammy Award for "Best Reggae Recording".

== Production ==
"Botha the Mosquito" is about South African president P. W. Botha. Wailer included a reproduction of the Universal Declaration of Human Rights in the album notes.

== Critical reception ==
Professional ratings
Review scores
Source	Rating
AllMusic	4.5/5 stars
Robert Christgau	B
Los Angeles Times	2/4 stars

The Los Angeles Times wrote: "Wailer seems snake-bitten here—the better melodies deliver lyrics that aren't particularly fresh, and the stronger themes are coupled with lackluster hooks that don't cut through the production problems." The Gazette called the album "roots reggae par excellence."

== Track listing ==
All tracks written by Neville "Bunny" Livingston.

1. "Rise and Shine"
2. "Liberation"
3. "Botha the Mosquito"
4. "Want to Come Home"
5. "Ready When You Ready"
6. "Didn't You Know"
7. "Dash Wey the Vial"
8. "Bald Head Jesus"
9. "Food"
10. "Serious Thing"

== Personnel ==
- Bunny Wailer - Percussion, Arranger, Director, Vocals, Producer, Cover Art Concept
- The Psalms - Background vocals
- Tony "Asher" Brissett - Keyboards
- Barry Barrington Bailey - Horn
- Headley Bennett - Horn
- Errol Carter - Bass
- Steven "Cat" Coore - Guitar
- Carlton "Santa" Davis - drums
- Sly Dunbar - Drums
- Bobby Ellis - Horn
- Harry T. Powell - Percussion
- Eric "Bingy Bunny" Lamont - Rhythm guitar
- Sugar Minott - Drums
- Johnny "Dizzy" Moore - Horn
- Sylvan Morris - Engineer
- Karl Pitterson - Mixing
- Dwight Pinkney - Guitar
- Robbie Shakespeare - Bass
- Earl "Chinna" Smith - Bass
- Keith Sterling - Keyboards
- Daniel "Danny Axeman" Thompson - Bass
- Neville Garrick - Graphic Design, Art Direction, Cover Art Concept
- Owen "Red Fox" Stewart - Keyboards
