= Bunny Wailer =

Jamaican musician (1947–2021)

The Honourable Bunny Wailer OM OJ
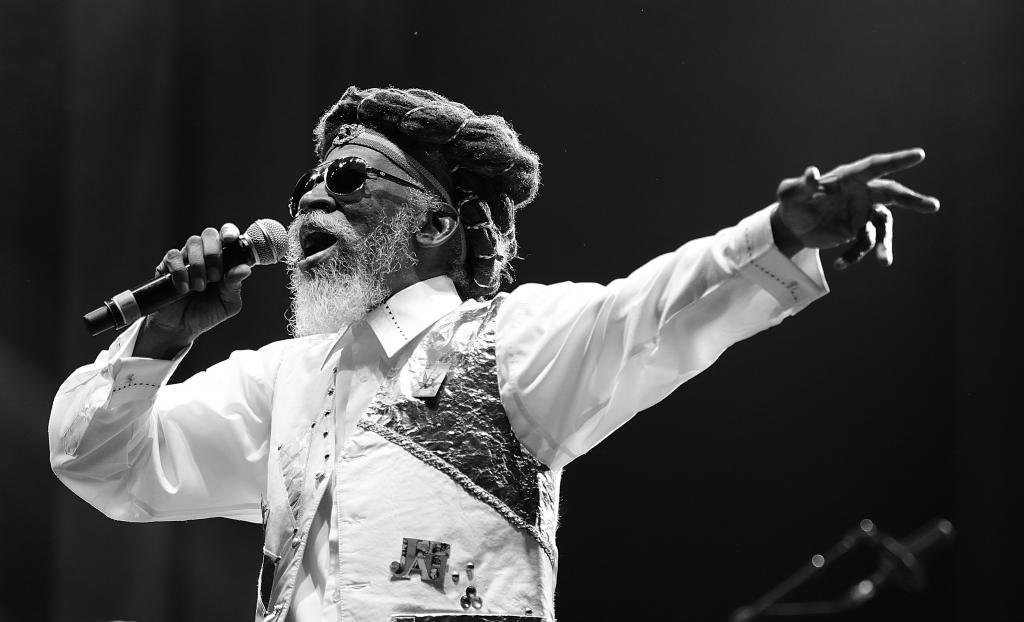
- Wailer performing in 2014

Background information
- Also known as: Bunny Livingston; Bunny O'Riley
- Born: Neville O'Riley Livingston; 10 April 1947; Kingston, Jamaica
- Died: 2 March 2021 (aged 73) Saint Andrew Parish, Jamaica
- Genres: Reggae; roots reggae; ska
- Occupations: Singer; songwriter; musician
- Instruments: Vocals; percussion
- Years active: 1960–2020
- Labels: JAD Records; Universal Music
- Formerly of: Bob Marley & The Wailers

Neville O'Riley Livingston OM OJ (10 April 1947 – 2 March 2021), known professionally as Bunny Wailer, was a Jamaican singer-songwriter and percussionist. He was an original member of reggae group The Wailers along with Bob Marley and Peter Tosh. A three-time Grammy Award winner, Wailer is considered one of the longtime standard-bearers of reggae music. He was also known as Jah B, Bunny O'Riley, and Bunny Livingston.

== Early life and family ==
Wailer was born Neville O'Riley Livingston on 10 April 1947 in Kingston. He spent his earliest years in the village of Nine Mile in Saint Ann Parish. It was there that he first met Bob Marley, and the two young boys befriended each other quickly. They both came from single-parent families; Livingston was brought up by his father, Marley by his mother. Later, Wailer's father, Thaddeus "Thaddy Shut" Livingston, lived with Marley's mother, Cedella Booker, in Trenchtown, and had a daughter with her named Pearl Livingston. Peter Tosh had a son, Andrew Tosh, with Wailer's sister Shirley, making Andrew his nephew.

== The Wailers ==
Wailer had originally gone to audition for Leslie Kong at Beverley's Records in 1962, around the same time his stepbrother Bob Marley was cutting "Judge Not". Wailer had intended to sing his first composition, "Pass It On", which at the time was more ska-oriented. However, Wailer was late getting out of school and missed his audition. A few months later, in 1963, he formed "The Wailing Wailers" with Marley and friend Peter Tosh, and the short-term members Junior Braithwaite and Beverley Kelso. Wailer tended to sing lead vocals less often than Marley and Tosh in the early years, but when Marley left Jamaica in 1966 for Delaware in the US, and was briefly replaced by Constantine "Vision" Walker, Wailer began to record and sing lead vocals on some of his own compositions, such as "Who Feels It Knows It", "I Stand Predominate", and "Sunday Morning". Wailer's style of music was influenced by gospel music and the soul singer Curtis Mayfield. In 1967, he recorded "This Train", based on a gospel standard, for the first time, at Studio One.

Wailer was arrested on charges of possession of cannabis in June 1967 and served a 14-month prison sentence. Around this time he, Bob Marley, and Peter Tosh signed an exclusive recording agreement with Danny Sim's JAD Records and an exclusive publishing agreement with Sim's music publishing company Cayman Music.

As the Wailers regularly changed producers in the late 1960s, Wailer continued to contribute songs to the group's repertoire. The music critic Kwame Dawes says that Wailer's song lyrics were carefully crafted and literary in style, and he remained a key part of the group's distinctive harmonies. Wailer sang lead on such songs as "Dreamland" (a cover of El Tempos' "My Dream Island", which soon became his signature song) "Riding High", "Brainwashing", and in the bridge of the Wailers' song, "Keep On Moving" (sung in the style of Curtis Mayfield of the Impressions), produced by Lee "Scratch" Perry. In 1971, the Wailers recorded Bunny Wailer's song "Pass It On", which he said he wrote in 1962; it was released as a dubplate mix on JAD's "Original Cuts" compilation. This version of the song features different lyrics and music in the verses to the later versions of "Pass It On" – Wailer would later reuse these in "Innocent Blood". By 1973, each of the three founding Wailers operated his own label, Marley with Tuff Gong, Tosh with H.I.M. Intel Diplo, and Bunny Wailer with Solomonic. He sang lead vocals on "Reincarnated Souls", the B-side of the Wailers first Island single of the new era, and on two tracks on the Wailers last trio LP, "Burnin'": "Pass it On" and "Hallelujah Time". By now he was recording singles in his own right, cutting "Searching For Love", "Life Line", "Trod On", "Arab Oil Weapon", and "Pass It On" (a new recording of the Wailers song) for his own label.

Bunny Wailer toured with the Wailers in England and the United States, but soon became reluctant to leave Jamaica. He and Tosh were more marginalised in the group as the Wailers attained international success, and attention was increasingly focused on Marley. Wailer subsequently left the Wailers in 1973 and adopted the name "Bunny" in pursuit of a solo career after balking when Chris Blackwell wanted the Wailers to tour freak clubs in the United States, stating that it was against his Rastafari principles. Before leaving the Wailers, Wailer had become more focused on his spiritual faith. He identified with the Rastafari movement, as did the other Wailers. He also composed much of his own material as well as re-recording a number of cuts from the Wailers' catalogue. Wailer recorded primarily in the roots style, in keeping with his often political and spiritual messages; his album Blackheart Man was well received. According to the journalist Peter Mason, writing in the Guardian newspaper, Blackheart Man "is widely felt to be one of reggae's highest peaks".

== Solo career ==
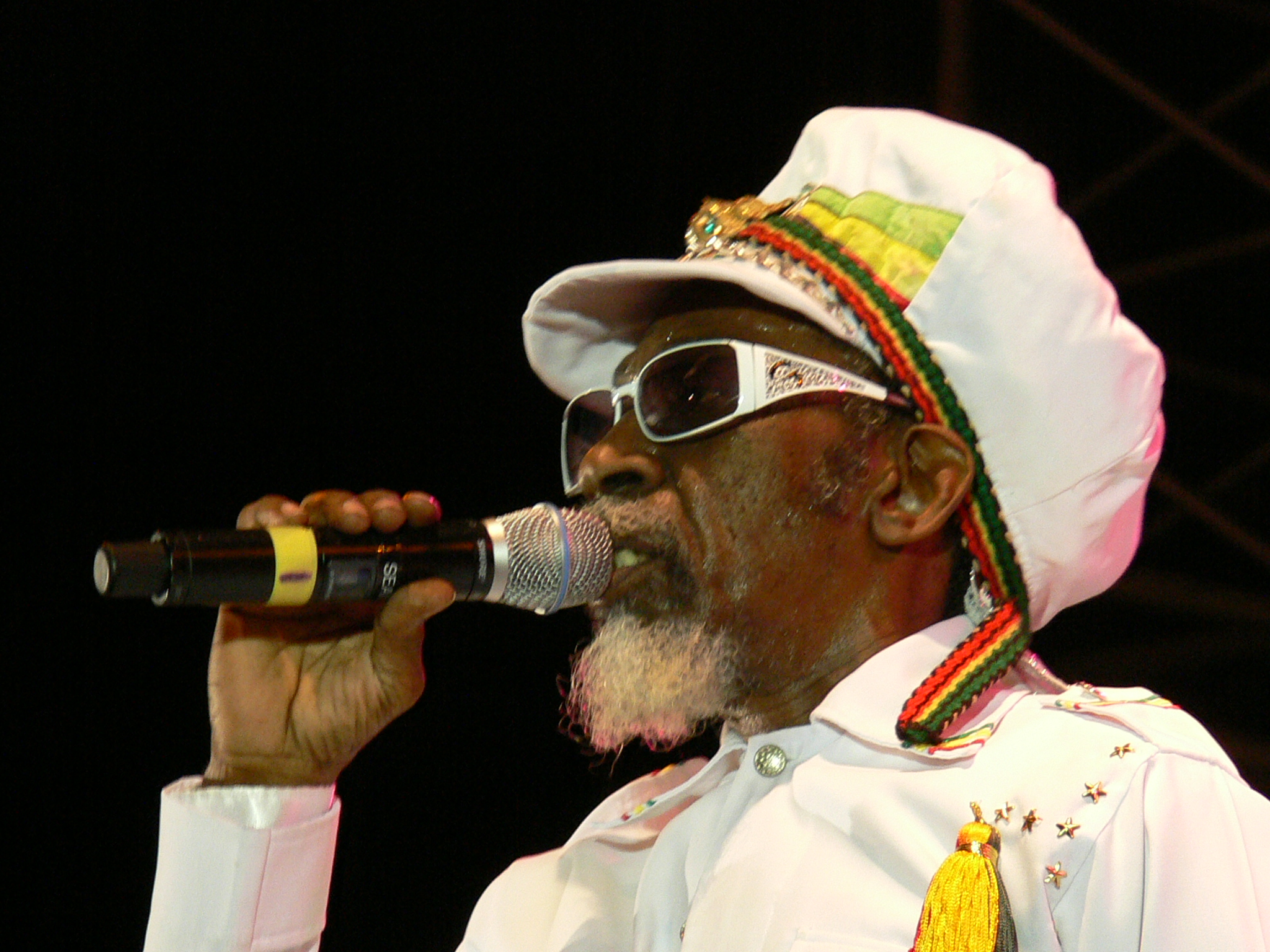
Wailer at Smile Jamaica in 2008

After leaving the Wailers, Wailer experimented with disco on his album Hook Line & Sinker, while Sings the Wailers reworks many of The Wailers' songs with the backing of Jamaican session musicians, Sly and Robbie. He also had success recording in the typically apolitical, more pop, dancehall style.

During this musical period, one of the highlights of Bunny Wailer's career was composing the hit single "Electric Boogie" in 1982 for Marcia Griffiths. This song led to the dance craze "Electric Slide" four years later, which gained popularity in Washington D.C. and other parts of the world. Bunny Wailer also recorded versions of the song for himself, although with less success compared to Griffiths' versions.

Wailer's music had dancehall and rockers influences, best exemplified by the album Bunny Wailer Sings the Wailers on which he reinterpreted some of the Wailers' material as a solo roots singer with roots reggae-based backing by Sly and Robbie. The album, produced by Bunny Wailer, was recorded at Harry J Studio. Some of these tracks are reworked classic Wailers tracks such as "Dreamland", a cover of El Tempos' "My Dream Island" with slightly reworked lyrics that became Bunny's signature song. This was recorded in 1966 by Clement Coxsone Dodd, and in 1972 with Lee "Scratch" Perry; it was released as a 7" in 1971 with a U-Roy version on the B-side. Another classic is "Dancing Shoes", first recorded in the mid-1960s as a driving ska/soul classic with Bunny Wailer on lead vocals.

Wailer won the Grammy Award for Best Reggae Album thrice; in 1991 for the album Time Will Tell: A Tribute to Bob Marley, in 1995 for Crucial! Roots Classics, and in 1997 for Hall of Fame: A Tribute to Bob Marley's 50th Anniversary. He was also featured on the album True Love by Toots and the Maytals, which won the Grammy Award in 2004 for Best Reggae Album, and showcased many notable musicians including; Willie Nelson, Eric Clapton, Jeff Beck, Trey Anastasio, Gwen Stefani / No Doubt, Ben Harper, Bonnie Raitt, Manu Chao, The Roots, Ryan Adams, Keith Richards, Toots Hibbert, Paul Douglas, Jackie Jackson, Ken Boothe, and The Skatalites. Wailer's catalogue is now under the curation of his agent Simon Vumbaca.

However, in 1991, Wailer faced one of the lowest points in his career at the annual Sting event in Portmore, when he was driven off stage by a shower of bottles thrown by the audience. This incident, not uncommon at dancehall events, highlighted the tension between Wailer's traditional style and the emerging trends popularized by artists such as Ninjaman and Shabba Ranks.

In August 2012, it was announced that Wailer would receive Jamaica's fifth highest honour, the Order of Jamaica.

In 2016, Wailer played a month-long 'Blackheart Man' tour to celebrate the 40th anniversary of his 1976 album. In October 2017, Wailer was awarded the Order of Merit by the Jamaican government, the nation's fourth-highest honour.

In October 2019, a commemorative blue plaque dedicated by the Nubian Jak Community Trust honoring Bob Marley, Peter Tosh, and Bunny Wailer was placed at the former site of Basing Street Studios in London, where Catch a Fire and Burnin' were completed.

In November 2019, Wailer received a Pinnacle Award in New York from the Coalition to Preserve Reggae.

== Health and death ==
In October 2018, Wailer suffered a minor stroke, resulting in speech problems. After suffering another stroke in July 2020, he was hospitalized at Andrews Memorial Hospital in Kingston, Jamaica, where he eventually died on 2 March 2021 at the age of 73, of complications from the stroke he suffered the previous year.

== Solo discography ==
=== Albums ===
- Blackheart Man (1976) Island/Tuff Gong (2 extra albums with Blackheart Man: Dubd'sco vol.1 (1976) Island/Tuff Gong and Blackheart Man (Remastered & Extended) (1976) Island/Tuff Gong)
- Protest (1977) Solomonic
- Struggle (1978) Solomonic
- In I Father's House (1979) Solomonic
- Bunny Wailer Sings the Wailers (1980) Solomonic
- Dubd'sco vol.2 (1981) Solomonic
- Rock 'n' Groove (1981) Solomonic
- Tribute (1981) Solomonic
- Hook Line & Sinker (1982) Solomonic
- Roots Radics Rockers Reggae (1983) Shanachie (international re-release of In I Father's House + 2 extra tracks)
- Live! (1983) Solomonic
- Marketplace (1985) Solomonic
- Rootsman Skanking (1987) Shanachie (international re-release of Rock And Groove edited version plus 3 extra tracks)
- Rule Dance Hall (1987) Shanachie
- Liberation (1989) Shanachie
- Time Will Tell: A Tribute to Bob Marley (1990) Shanachie (international re-release of Tribute + 2 extra tracks)
- Gumption (1990) Shanachie
- The Never Ending Wailers (1991) RAS
- Dance Massive (1992) Solomonic
- Just Be Nice (1993) RAS
- Hall of Fame: A Tribute to Bob Marley's 50th Anniversary (1996) RAS
- Communication (2000) Solomonic
- World Peace (2003) Solomonic
- Bunny Wailer's Sound Clash (2006) Charly Records
- Rub A Dub (2007) Solomonic
- Cross Culture (2009) Solomonic
- Reincarnated Souls (2013), VP – 3CD + 2DVD set Solomonic
- Dub Fi Dub (2018) R.O.K./The Original Genesis

=== Compilations ===
- Crucial! Roots Classics (1994) RAS
- Retrospective (1995) Solomonic/Shanachie
- Dubd'sco Volumes 1 & 2 (1998) RAS
- Bob Marley & The Wailers Vol 2: Bunny Wailer & Johnny Lover (2002) Saludos Amigos (with Johnny Lover)
- Winning Combinations: Bunny Wailer & Dennis Brown (2002) Universal Special Products (with Dennis Brown)
- The Wailers Legacy (2006) Solomonic (Bunny Wailer & The Wailers)
- Solomonic Singles 1: Tread Along: 1969–1976 (2016) Dub Store Records/Tuff Gong/Island
- Solomonic Singles 2: Rise and Shine: 1977–1986 (2016) Dub Store Records/Solomonic

=== DVDs ===
- Live (2005) Video Music, Inc.

==== Appearances on DVD compilations ====
- A Reggae Session (1988) Sony BMG, features "Roots, Radics, Rockers and Reggae" and "Rise and Shine"

==== Discography overview ====
- Roots Reggae Library
