= The Complete Bob Marley & the Wailers 1967–1972 =

Series of compilation albums by Bob Marley and the Wailers

Box set by Bob Marley and the Wailers
- Released: 1997–2002
- Genre: Reggae
- Label: JAD

Bob Marley and the Wailers chronology
21 Winners: The Best of Bob Marley and the Wailers (1997)	The Complete Bob Marley & the Wailers 1967–1972 (1997)	Chant Down Babylon (1999)

The Complete Bob Marley & the Wailers 1967–1972 is a series of compilation albums by Bob Marley and the Wailers released in eleven volumes by JAD Records between 1997 and 2002.

== Background ==
Released in 1998–2003, this 220-track series revealed more than one hundred rare Bob Marley & the Wailers recordings to the world, including major songs like "Selassie Is the Chapel", and many of them previously unreleased, such as "Rock to the Rock". Many of the rarest selections came directly from Roger Steffens' huge collection. Co-produced with partner Bruno Blum, the series revived the JAD label, a small company that had signed an exclusive contract with Marley and his wife Rita as well as original Wailers member Peter Tosh in 1967. Although many of the recordings have since been available on various compilations, the quality of the original ten releases, which include extensive liner notes and rare contemporary photographs, remains unmatched.

== Track listings ==
=== Part I ===
==== Vol. 1: Rock to the Rock ====
Rock to the Rock

Compilation album by Bob Marley & the Wailers
- Released: 1998
- Recorded: 1968
- Studios: Dynamic Sounds, Kingston 11, Jamaica
- Genres: Rocksteady, reggae, dub
- Length: 48:35
- Label: JAD
- Producers: Johnny Nash, Arthur Jenkins
- Compilers: Bruno Blum, Roger Steffens

1. "Rock to the Rock" – 2:25^{A}
2. "Rocking Steady" (alternate) – 2:03^{A}
3. "How Many Times" (also known as "Do You Remember") – 3:04
4. "Touch Me" – 3:01
5. "Mellow Mood" (alternate) – 2:35
6. "There She Goes" (alternate) – 2:32
7. "Soul Rebel" (original) – 3:52
8. "Put It On" (alternate) – 3:01
9. "Chances Are" (alternate) – 3:19
10. "Love" – 2:53^{A}
11. "Bend Down Low" (alternate) – 3:28
12. "The World Is Changing" – 2:36
13. "Nice Time" (alternate) – 2:46^{A}
14. "Treat You Right" – 2:16
15. "What Goes Around Comes Around" (original) – 4:14^{A}
  Dub track:
16. "What Goes Around Comes Around" (version) – 4:15^{A}

==== Vol. 2: Selassie Is the Chapel ====
Selassie Is the Chapel

Compilation album by Bob Marley & the Wailers
- Released: 1998
- Recorded: 1968–1970
- Studios: West Indies; JBC; Federal; Randy's, Kingston, Jamaica
- Genres: Reggae, dub
- Length: 46:20
- Label: JAD
- Producers: The Wailers, Mortimer Planno, Johnny Nash, Arthur Jenkins, Ted Pouder
- Compilers: Bruno Blum, Roger Steffens

1. "Don't Rock My Boat" (original) (later known as "Satisfy My Soul") – 2:32^{B}
2. "The Lord Will Make a Way" – 2:12^{B}
3. "Chances Are" (original) – 3:19^{B}
4. "Selassie Is the Chapel" – 3:52^{B}
5. "Tread Oh" – 2:49^{B}
6. "Feel Alright" (original) – 2:31^{B}
7. "Rhythm" – 2:31^{B}
8. "Rocking Steady" (original) – 1:49^{B}
9. "Adam and Eve" – 3:05
10. "Wisdom" (original) (also known as "Fools Die" and "Stiff Necked Fools") – 3:13
11. "This Train" (alternate) – 2:39
12. "Thank You Lord" (alternate) – 3:20
13. "Give Me a Ticket" (original) (also known as "The Letter") – 1:58^{B}
14. "Trouble on the Road Again" – 2:32^{B}
15. "Black Progress" (medley: "Black Progress"/"(Say It Loud) I'm Black and I'm Proud") – 2:30^{B}
  Dub tracks:
16. "Black Progress" (version) – 2:37^{B}
17. "Tread Oh" (version) – 2:25^{B}

==== Vol. 3: Best of The Wailers ====
Best of The Wailers

Compilation album by Bob Marley & the Wailers
- Released: 1998
- Recorded: 1969–1970
- Studios: Dynamic Sounds; Randy's, Kingston, Jamaica
- Genres: Reggae, dub
- Length: 36:33
- Label: JAD
- Producers: Leslie Kong, the Wailers, Bunny Lee
- Compilers: Bruno Blum, Roger Steffens

1. "Sugar Sugar" – 2:46^{B}
2. "Stop the Train" – 2:18
3. "Cheer Up" – 2:01
4. "Soon Come" – 2:21
5. "Soul Captives" – 2:02
6. "Go Tell It on the Mountain" – 3:14
7. "Can't You See" (alternate) – 2:40
8. "Give Me a Ticket" (alternate) (also known as "The Letter") – 1:59^{B}
9. "Hold On to This Feeling" (also known as "Gotta Hold On to This Feeling") – 2:55^{B}
10. "Mr. Chatterbox" (alternate) (also known as "Mr. Talkative") – 2:37
  Dub tracks:
11. "Soul Shake Down" (version) – 3:06
12. "Soon Come" (version) – 2:24
13. "Mr. Chatterbox" (version) – 3:02
14. "Hold On to This Feeling" (version) – 2:50^{B}

=== Part II ===
==== Vol. 4: Soul Rebels ====
Soul Rebels

Compilation album by Bob Marley & the Wailers
- Released: 1998
- Recorded: 1970
- Studios: Dynamic Sounds; Randy's, Kingston, Jamaica
- Genres: Reggae, dub
- Length: 60:57
- Label: JAD
- Producer: Lee "Scratch" Perry
- Compilers: Bruno Blum, Roger Steffens

1. "Try Me" – 2:45
2. "It's Alright" – 2:34
3. "No Sympathy" – 2:13
4. "My Cup" (also known as "I Have to Cry, Cry, Cry") – 3:34
5. "Soul Almighty" – 2:41
6. "Rebel's Hop" (medley: "Keep On Moving"/"Cloud Nine"/"Rebel's Hop") – 2:38
7. "Corner Stone" – 2:27
8. "Four Hundred Years" – 2:31
9. "No Water" – 2:08
10. "Reaction" – 2:41
  Dub tracks:
11. "My Sympathy" ("Four Hundred Years" version) – 2:43
12. "Soul Rebel" (version) – 2:53
13. "Try Me" (version) – 3:01
14. "It's Alright" (version) – 2:29
15. "No Sympathy" (version) – 2:23
16. "My Cup" (version) – 3:12
17. "Soul Almighty" (version) – 3:20
18. "Rebel's Hop" (version) – 2:46
19. "Corner Stone" (version) – 2:23
20. "No Water" (version) (false start) – 0:11
21. "No Water" (version) – 2:34
22. "Reaction" (version) – 3:32
23. "Rebel Version" (also known as "Soul Rebel" version 2) – 2:40

==== Vol. 5: Soul Revolution Part II ====
Soul Revolution Part II

Compilation album by Bob Marley & the Wailers
- Released: 1998
- Recorded: 1970
- Studios: Dynamic Sounds and Randy's, Kingston, Jamaica
- Genres: Reggae, dub
- Length: 58:01
- Label: JAD
- Producer: Lee "Scratch" Perry
- Compilers: Bruno Blum, Roger Steffens

1. "Keep On Moving" (original) (also known as "I Gotta Keep On Moving") – 3:05
2. "Put It On" (alternate) – 3:33
3. "Fussing and Fighting" – 2:28
4. "Memphis" – 2:09
5. "Riding High" – 2:44
6. "Kaya" (original) – 2:38
7. "African Herbsman" – 2:21
8. "Stand Alone" – 2:10
9. "Brain Washing" – 2:40
  Dub tracks:
10. "Keep On Moving" (version) – 3:04
11. "Don't Rock My Boat" (version) – 4:30
12. "Fussing and Fighting" (version) – 3:32
13. "Put It On" (version) – 2:27
14. "Duppy Version" ("Duppy Conqueror" version) – 2:07
15. "Memphis" (version) – 2:07
16. "Riding High" (version) – 2:45
17. "Kaya" (version 1) – 2:37
18. "African Herbsman" (version) – 2:21
19. "Stand Alone" (version) – 2:08
20. "Sun Is Shining" (version) – 2:08
21. "Brain Washing" (version) – 2:40

==== Vol. 6: More Axe ====
More Axe

Compilation album by Bob Marley & the Wailers
- Released: 1998
- Recorded: 1970–1971
- Studios: Dynamic Sounds and Randy's, Kingston, Jamaica
- Genres: Reggae, dub
- Length: 52:25
- Label: JAD
- Producer: Lee "Scratch" Perry
- Compilers: Bruno Blum, Roger Steffens

1. "Kaya" (alternate) – 2:34^{A}
2. "Love Light" (original) – 3:01
3. "Second Hand" (original) – 3:57
4. "Jah Is Mighty" ("Corner Stone" alternate) – 2:27
5. "Run for Cover" ("Soul Rebel" alternate) – 3:14
6. "Man to Man" (original) (later known as "Who the Cap Fit") – 3:31
7. "Downpresser" – 3:14^{B}
8. "Don't Rock My Boat" (alternate 2) – 2:54
9. "More Axe" ("Small Axe" alternate) – 3:31
10. "Long Long Winter" – 3:03
11. "All in One" (original) – 3:40
12. "Turn Me Loose" ("Kaya" alternate) – 2:34
  Dub tracks:
13. "Kaya" (version 2) (scat mix) – 2:42
14. "Battle Axe" (version) ("Small Axe" version) – 3:03
15. "Long Long Winter" (version) – 3:40
16. "Second Hand" (version) – 3:06
17. "Downpresser" (version) – 3:10^{B}
18. "Shocks of Mighty" ("Soul Almighty" version) (featuring Lee Perry) – 3:24
19. "Axe Man" ("Small Axe" binghi version) – 2:54^{B}
20. "Nicoteen" ("Man to Man" version) – 2:37

=== Part III ===
==== Vol. 7: Keep On Skanking ====
Keep On Skanking

Compilation album by Bob Marley & the Wailers
- Released: 1998
- Recorded: 1971–1972
- Studios: Randy's, Kingston, Jamaica; Dynamic Sounds, Kingston, Jamaica
- Genres: Reggae, dub
- Length: 61:04
- Label: JAD
- Producers: Lee "Scratch" Perry, the Wailers
- Compilers: Bruno Blum, Roger Steffens

1. "All in One" (alternate) (featuring Lee Perry) (medley: "Bend Down Low"/"Nice Time"/"One Love"/"Simmer Down"/"Love and Affection") – 2:19^{B}
2. "All in One, Part II" (featuring Lee Perry) (medley: "Love and Affection"/"Put It On") – 2:04^{B}
3. "Keep On Skanking" – 3:21
4. "Dreamland" – 2:42
5. "Love Light" (alternate) – 2:49^{B}
6. "Brand New Second Hand" (false start) – 0:26^{B}
7. "Brand New Second Hand" ("Second Hand" alternate) – 3:58
8. "Shocks of Mighty" (alternate) (featuring Lee Perry) – 3:32
9. "Keep On Moving" (extended version) (Part I) (also known as "I Gotta Keep On Moving") – 3:09^{B}
10. "Keep On Moving" (extended version) (Part II) (featuring Wong Chu) – 3:15^{B}
11. "Keep On Moving" (extended version) (Part III) – 2:31^{B}
12. "Concrete Jungle" – 3:09
13. "Screwface" (alternate 2) – 2:53^{B}
14. "Satisfy My Soul Babe" – 2:07
15. "Send Me That Love" – 3:26^{B}
16. "Comma Comma" – 1:55^{B}
  Dub tracks:
17. "Jungle Dub" – 2:19
18. "Dracula" ("Who Is Mr Brown" version) – 3:10
19. "Love Light" (version) – 2:53^{B}
20. "Dreamland" (version) – 3:31
21. "Face Man" ("Screw Face" version) – 3:40^{B}
22. "Satisfy My Soul Babe" (version) – 2:28

==== Vol. 8: Satisfy My Soul Jah Jah ====
Satisfy My Soul Jah Jah

Compilation album by Bob Marley & the Wailers
- Released: 1998
- Recorded: 1971–1972
- Studios: Randy's (Kingston, Jamaica); Dynamic Sounds (Kingston, Jamaica); CBS Theobalds Road (London, England); Bob's room (Aljvik, Sweden)
- Genres: Reggae, dub
- Length: 66:28
- Label: JAD
- Producers: The Wailers, Johnny Nash
- Compilers: Bruno Blum, Roger Steffens

1. "Screwface" (alternate) – 2:19
2. "Redder Than Red" – 3:10
3. "Lively Up Yourself" (original) – 2:53
4. "Trouble Dub" ("Trouble on the Road Again" alternate) – 3:31^{B}
5. "Dub Feeling" ("Feel Alright" alternate) – 3:40^{B}
6. "Satisfy My Soul Jah Jah" ("Satisfy My Soul Babe" version) – 2:28^{B}
7. "Kingston 12 Shuffle" ("Trench Town Rock" version) (featuring U-Roy) – 2:45^{B}
8. "Pour Down the Sunshine" – 2:18^{B}
9. "Gonna Get You" – 3:13
10. "Cry to Me" (acoustic version) – 1:30^{B}
11. "Reggae on Broadway" – 3:14^{C}
12. "I'm Hurting Inside" (alternate) – 3:38^{C}
13. "Oh Lord, Got to Get There" – 2:52^{C}
14. "Dance Do the Reggae" – 3:08^{C}
15. "Stay with Me" – 2:59^{C}
16. "Guava Jelly" (alternate) – 2:08^{B}
  Dub tracks:
17. "Guava" ("Guava Jelly" version) – 2:13^{B}
18. "Red" ("Redder than Red" version) – 2:46
19. "Live" ("Lively Up Yourself" version) – 2:52^{B}
20. "Samba" ("Lick Samba" version) – 2:34^{B}
21. "Screwface" (version) – 2:16
22. "Grooving Kingston 12" ("Trench Town Rock" version) – 2:57^{B}
23. "Choke" ("Craven Choke Puppy" version) – 2:37^{B}
24. "Satisfy My Soul Jah Jah" (version) – 2:35^{B}

=== Part IV ===
==== Vol. 9: Freedom Time ====
Freedom Time

Compilation album by Bob Marley & the Wailers
- Released: 2002
- Recorded: 1968
- Studios: West Indies, Jamaica Recording, Dynamic Sounds (Kingston, Jamaica)
- Genres: Reggae, soul
- Length: 65:51
- Label: JAD
- Producers: The Wailers, Johnny Nash
- Compilers: Bruno Blum, Roger Steffens

1. "Hypocrites" (alternate) – 2:44^{A}
2. "Freedom Time" – 2:47^{B}
3. "Lyrical Satirical I" – 2:42^{B}
4. "This Train" (alternate) – 3:37^{B}
5. "Funeral" – 3:21^{B}
6. "Pound Get a Blow" – 2:44^{B}
7. "Stepping Razor" – 2:26^{B}
8. "I'm Hurting Inside" (original) – 3:15^{B}
9. "Dem a Fi Get a Beatin'" – 1:49^{A}
10. "Fire Fire" – 1:51
11. "Play Play Play" (featuring Rita Marley) – 2:34^{A}
  Soul mixes:
12. "Bend Down Low" – 4:15^{A}
13. "Nice Time" – 3:04^{A}
14. "Rocking Steady" – 2:12^{A}
15. "Rock to the Rock" – 2:36^{A}
16. "Chance Are" – 3:24^{A}
17. "Mellow Mood" – 2:54^{A}
18. "Love" – 3:16^{A}
19. "Rhapsody" (featuring Rita Marley) – 2:17^{A}
  Demos:
20. "Falling In and Out of Love" (original) – 4:08^{A}
21. "Splish for My Splash" (original) – 2:15^{A}
22. "Stranger on the Shore" (original) – 2:50^{A}
23. "Hypocrites" (version) – 2:42

=== Part V ===
==== Vol. 10: Soul Adventurer ====
Soul Adventurer

Compilation album by Bob Marley & the Wailers
- Released: 2002
- Recorded: 1970–1972
- Studios: Randy's and Dynamic Sounds (Kingston, Jamaica)
- Genres: Reggae, dub
- Length: 72:58
- Label: JAD
- Producers: Lee "Scratch" Perry, the Wailers
- Compilers: Bruno Blum, Roger Steffens

1. "Soul Rebel" (alternate 2) – 3:19^{A}
2. "Sun Is Shining" (DJ version) (featuring Johnny Lover) – 2:09^{B}
3. "Keep On Moving" (alternate) (also known as "I've Gotta Keep On Moving") – 3:08^{A}
4. "It's Alright" (alternate) – 2:32^{A}
5. "Duppy Conqueror" (version 4) – 3:25
6. "I Like It This" ("Don't Rock My Boat" DJ version) (featuring Johnny Lover) – 2:50
7. "Concrete Jungle" (alternate) – 2:58
8. "Kingston 12 Shuffle" ("Trench Town Rock" DJ version) (featuring U-Roy) – 2:50^{B}
9. "Put It On" (full length) – 4:01
10. "No Sympathy" (full length) – 2:53
11. "Reaction" (full length) – 3:37^{A}
12. "Man to Man" (alternate) (full length) – 4:12^{A}
13. "Natural Mystic" – 5:46
14. "Rainbow Country" (full length) – 6:11
15. "Don't Rock My Boat" (alternate 3) – 3:19^{B}
  Dub tracks:
16. "Natural Dub" ("Natural Mystic" version) – 6:11
17. "Rainbow Dub" – 5:27
18. "Sun Is Shining" (side 2) ("Sun Is Shining" version) – 2:10^{B}
19. "Red" (alternate) ("Redder than Red" version) – 2:51^{B}
20. "Zig Zag" ("Duppy Conqueror" version) – 3:00

=== Part VI ===
==== Vol. 11: Lonesome Feeling ====
1. "Head Corner Stone"
2. "More Axe"
3. "Satisfy My Soul Babe"
4. "Satisfy My Soul Jah Jah Dub"
5. "More Axe"
6. "A Little Prayer"
7. "Lonesome Feeling"
8. "Oh Lord I've Got to Get There"
9. "Reggae on Broadway"
10. "Lonely Girl"
11. "Milk Shake and Potato Chips"
12. "It Hurts to Be Alone"
13. "Rock to the Rock"

== Chart positions ==
Part I

Chart (1998)	Peak position
US Reggae Albums (Billboard)	4

Vol. 2: Selassie Is the Chapel

Chart (1998)	Peak position
US Reggae Albums (Billboard)	10

== Notes ==
^A Previously unreleased
^B Previously unreleased outside Jamaica
^C Previously unreleased mix
