= Blackman Know Yourself =

Studio album by Joe Higgs
- Released: 1990
- Label: Shanachie
- Producers: Lee Jaffe, Joe Higgs

Joe Higgs chronology
Family (1988)	Blackman Know Yourself (1990)	Joe and Marcia Together (1995)

Blackman Know Yourself is an album by the Jamaican musician Joe Higgs, released in 1990. He is credited with the Wailers Band.

== Production ==
The album was produced by Lee Jaffe and Higgs, although there are questions about how much Jaffe was involved. "Steppin Razor'", written by Higgs, was popularized by Peter Tosh. "Small Axe" and "Sun Is Shining" are covers of Bob Marley songs. "Oh Carol" is a cover of the Gladiators song.

== Critical reception ==
Professional ratings
Review scores
Source	Rating
AllMusic	4/5 stars
Chicago Tribune	3/4 stars
Robert Christgau	(1-star Honorable Mention)
The Encyclopedia of Popular Music	2/5 stars
MusicHound World: The Essential Album Guide	3/5 stars
The State	2.5/5 stars

The Austin American-Statesman wrote that "the rumbling bass of Aston 'Family Man' Barrett keeps the music anchored in authenticity and Higgs' expressive voice does the rest." The Boston Globe praised Higgs's "silky smooth vocals," writing that "the music upholds a roots-reggae sound and consciousness." The Houston Chronicle stated that Higgs's "soulful, powerfully 'dread' singing offers a reminder of the music's spiritual foundation too often neglected or trivialized by latter-day reggae artists."

The Gazette thought that "'Sons of Garvey', 'Wave of War', and the title track, 'Blackman Know Yourself', are all sparkling examples of Higgs at his best." The Chicago Tribune concluded that Higgs's "voice of middle-aged experience is well-suited to plaintive love songs such as 'She Was the One' or Bob Marley's sultry 'Sun Is Shining'... On the title track, his dignified, authoritative rasp breaks into a falsetto wail that by itself is worth the price of the disc."

AllMusic wrote that, "when other reggae artists were going for high-tech productions and incorporating hip-hop or urban contemporary elements, Higgs stuck with the type of simplicity that had characterized him since the '60s."

== Track listing ==
No.	Title	Length
1.	"Blackman Know Yourself"
2.	"Oh Carol"
3.	"Small Axe"
4.	"Sons of Garvey"
5.	"She Was the One"
6.	"Steppin' Razor"
7.	"Saturday Morning"
8.	"Wave of War"
9.	"Let Us Do Something"
10.	"Sun Is Shining"
