= African Herbsman =

Compilation album by the Wailers
- Released: July 1973
- Recorded: 1970–71
- Genre: Reggae
- Length: 47:37
- Label: Trojan
- Producer: Lee Perry

The Wailers chronology
Catch a Fire (1973)	African Herbsman (1973)	Burnin' (1973)

Professional ratings
Review scores
Source	Rating
AllMusic	5/5 stars

African Herbsman is a 1973 Trojan Records repackage of Bob Marley and the Wailers' 1971 album Soul Revolution Part II produced by Lee "Scratch" Perry, which had had a limited Jamaica-only release. African Herbsman was released shortly after the band's major-label debut album Catch a Fire had been released by Island Records.

The album differs from Soul Revolution Part II by adding five other tracks from the period. Four are non-album singles, including two of the group's self-productions, "Trenchtown Rock" and "Lively Up Yourself", as well as "400 Years" by Peter Tosh from the album Soul Rebels.

Several of the songs would later be re-recorded by Marley; examples are "Lively Up Yourself" (on Natty Dread), "Duppy Conqueror", "Put It On" and "Small Axe" (on Burnin'), and "Sun Is Shining" (on Kaya).

== Track listing ==
=== Original album (1973) ===
All tracks written by Bob Marley, unless noted.

Side one
No.	Title	Writer(s)	Original release	Length
1.	"Lively Up Yourself"	Bob Marley	Non-album single (1971)	2:53
2.	"Small Axe"	Marley	Non-album single (1970)	3:54
3.	"Duppy Conqueror"	Marley	Soul Revolution Part II (1971)	3:44
4.	"Trenchtown Rock"	Marley	Non-album single (1971)	2:57
5.	"African Herbsman"	Richie Havens	Soul Revolution Part II (1971)	2:24
6.	"Keep on Moving"	Lee Perry, Curtis Mayfield, Marley	Soul Revolution Part II (1971)	3:09
7.	"Fussing and Fighting"	Marley	Soul Revolution Part II (1971)	2:28
8.	"Stand Alone"	Marley	Soul Revolution Part II (1971)	2:12

Side two
No.	Title	Writer(s)	Original release	Length
9.	"All in One" (medley pt.1) ("Bend Down Low" / "Nice Time" / "One Love" / "Simmer Down" / "It Hurts to Be Alone" / "Lonesome Feelings" / "Love and Affection" / "Put It On" / "Duppy Conqueror")	Neville Livingston, Marley	Non-album single (1971)	3:36
10.	"Don't Rock the Boat"	Marley	Soul Revolution Part II (1971)	4:33
11.	"Put it On"	Marley	Soul Revolution Part II (1971)	3:33
12.	"Sun Is Shining"	Marley	Soul Revolution Part II (1971)	2:15
13.	"Kaya"	Marley	Soul Revolution Part II (1971)	2:39
14.	"Riding High"	Neville Livingston, Cole Porter	Soul Revolution Part II (1971)	2:44
15.	"Brain Washing"	Marley	Soul Revolution Part II (1971)	2:38
16.	"400 Years"	Peter Tosh	Soul Rebels (1970)	2:32

=== Trojan Records reissue (2003) ===
Bonus tracks cat# 06076-80399-2 6
No.	Title	Writer(s)	Original release	Length
17.	"Memphis" (The Upsetters dub version)	Chuck Berry	Soul Revolution Part II (1971)	2:09
18.	"Live" ("Lively Up Yourself" version)	Tommy McCook	Non-album single (1971)	2:51
19.	"More Axe"	Bob Marley	Non-album single (1970)	2:31
20.	"the Axe Man" ("Small Axe" version)	The Upsetters	Non-album single (1970)	2:47
21.	"Zig Zag" ("Duppy Conqueror" version)	The Upsetters	Non-album single (1970)	2:58
22.	"Grooving Kingston 12" ("Trenchtown Rock" version)	Bob Marley and the Wailers	Non-album single (1971)	2:56
23.	"Moving Version" (DJ Big Youth version)	Lee Perry, Curtis Mayfield, Bob Marley	Non-album single (1971)	2:58
24.	"Keep on Skanking"	Bob Marley	Non-album single (1974)	3:21
25.	"Copasetic:" ("All in One" version) ("Bend Down Low" / "Nice Time" / "One Love" / "Simmer Down" / "It Hurts to be Alone" / "Lonesome Feeling")	The Upsetters	Non-album single (1971)	3:05
26.	"Kaya" (version 2)	Bob Marley and the Wailers	Non-album single (1971)	2:41
