= Bob Marley at His Best =

1992 reggae album by Bob Marley and The Wailers

At His Best

Studio album by Bob Marley
- Released: 30 March 1992
- Genre: Reggae
- Length: 32:52
- Label: Special Music

Bob Marley chronology
One Love (1991)	At His Best (1992)	Songs of Freedom (1992)

Professional ratings
Review scores
Source	Rating
Allmusic	2/5 stars

Bob Marley At His Best is a compilation album from reggae artist Bob Marley and The Wailers. The album was released 30 March 1992 on the Special Music label.

== Track listing ==
1. "Try Me" - 2:46
2. "My Cup" - 3:09
3. "Keep On Moving" - 3:00
4. "Stand Alone" - 2:08
5. "Mellow Mood" - 2:37
6. "Soul Rebel" - 3:15
7. "Rebel's Hop" - 2:30
8. "The Sun Is Shining" - 2:08
9. "Small Axe" - 3:35
10. "Riding High" - 2:14
11. "Lively Up Yourself" - 2:40
12. "Soul Shakedown Party" - 2:50

== Personnel ==
The following personnel are credited with this album:

- James Brown - composer
- Bob Marley - composer, guitar, primary artist, vocals
- Bob Marley and The Wailers - primary artist
- Pair - record label
- Lee "Scratch" Perry - composer
- Cole Porter - composer
- Special Music Company - record label
