= Small Axe =

Small Axe may refer to:

- "Small Axe" (song), 1973 song by Bob Marley and the Wailers
- Small Axe (anthology), 2020 anthology of films by Steve McQueen
- Small Axe Project, academic journal about Caribbean literature
