= 21 Winners: The Best of Bob Marley and the Wailers =

21 Winners: The Best Of Bob Marley and the Wailers

Greatest hits album by Bob Marley and the Wailers
- Released: 14 August 1997
- Recorded: 1969–1977
- Genres: Reggae, R&B
- Length: 60:33
- Label: Madacy Entertainment

Bob Marley and the Wailers chronology
Natural Mystic (1995)	21 Winners: The Best Of Bob Marley and the Wailers (1997)	The Complete Bob Marley & the Wailers 1967–1972 (1997–2002)

Professional ratings
Review scores
Source	Rating
AllMusic	3.5/5 stars

21 Winners: The Best Of Bob Marley and the Wailers is an album by Bob Marley and the Wailers, released on 14 August 1997 under the Madacy Entertainment record label. It includes twenty-one tracks.

== Track listing ==
1. "Soul Rebel" (Bob Marley) – 3:15
2. "Natural Mystic" (Marley) – 5:37
3. "Memphis" (Chuck Berry) – 2:54
4. "Soul Captives" (Marley) – 2:03
5. "Don't Rock My Boat" (Marley) – 4:20
6. "Rebel's Hop" (Marley) – 2:34
7. "Duppy Conqueror" (Marley) – 3:34
8. "Brain Washing" (Marley) – 2:16
9. "You Can't Do That to Me" (Marley) – 2:46
10. "Mr. Brown" (Gregory Isaacs, Marley) – 3:22
11. "Sun Is Shining" (Marley) – 2:02
12. "There She Goes" (Marley) – 2:40
13. "Treat You Right" (Marcus Miller, Jimmy Norman) – 2:15
14. "Fussing and Fighting" (Marley, Lee "Scratch" Perry) – 2:25
15. "Trench Town Rock" (Marley) – 2:51
16. "Soul Almighty" (Marley, Perry)
17. "Corner Stone" (Marley) – 2:10
18. "Keep on Moving" (Marley) – 3:02
19. "Riding High" (Perry, Cole Porter) – 2:38
20. "Soul Shakedown Party" (Marley) – 3:01
21. "Soon Come" (Marley, Peter Tosh) – 2:16
