= Catch a Fire =

1973 studio album by Bob Marley & The Wailers

- The original 1973 'Zippo lighter' hinged album sleeve

Studio album by Bob Marley and the Wailers
- Released: 13 April 1973
- Recorded: May–October 1972
- Studios: Dynamic Sound (Kingston); Harry J's (Kingston); Randy's (Kingston); Island (London)
- Genres: Reggae; reggae rock; roots reggae
- Length: 35:56
- Labels: Tuff Gong, Island
- Producers: Bob Marley, Chris Blackwell

Bob Marley and the Wailers chronology
The Best of the Wailers (1971)	Catch a Fire (1973)	African Herbsman (1973)

Alternative 'spliff' cover
- The sleeve art from the 1974 issue of the album

Catch a Fire is the fifth studio album by the reggae band Bob Marley and the Wailers, released in April 1973. It was their first album released by Island Records. After finishing a UK tour with Johnny Nash, they had started laying down tracks for JAD Records when a disputed CBS contract with Danny Sims created tensions. The band did not have enough money to return to Jamaica, so their road manager Brent Clarke approached producer Chris Blackwell, who agreed to advance The Wailers money for an album. They used this money to pay their fares back home, where they completed the recordings that constitute Catch a Fire. The album has nine songs, two of which were written and composed by Peter Tosh; the remaining seven were by Bob Marley. While Bunny Wailer is not credited as a writer, the group's writing style was a collective process. For the immediate follow-up album, Burnin', also released in 1973, he contributed four songs. After Marley returned with the tapes to London, Blackwell reworked the tracks at Island Studios, with contributions by Muscle Shoals session musician Wayne Perkins, who played guitar on three overdubbed tracks. The album had a limited original release under the name The Wailers in a sleeve depicting a Zippo lighter, designed by graphic artists Rod Dyer and Bob Weiner; subsequent releases had an alternative cover designed by John Bonis, featuring an Esther Anderson portrait of Marley smoking a "spliff", and crediting the band as Bob Marley and the Wailers.

The Catch a Fire Tour, which covered England and the United States, helped generate international interest in the band. Catch a Fire peaked at number 171 on the Billboard 200 and number 51 on the Billboard Black Albums charts. Critical acclaim has included the album being listed at number 126 on Rolling Stone's 500 Greatest Albums of All Time, second only to Legend among five Bob Marley albums on the list. It is regarded as one of the top reggae albums of all time.

The group title Bob Marley and the Wailers being used on Bob Marley solo albums has created a lot of marketing and identity confusion for The Wailers' catalog. This follows the confusion generated by their company Tuff Gong Records (registered in 1973) and the similarly-named Tuff Gong International (registered by the Bob Marley Estate in 1991); this resulted in the 1999 Tuff Gong Settlement Agreement, which sought to separate the group's catalog from Bob Marley's solo catalog. The dual releases of Catch a Fire under both group names is where this marketing confusion began.

== Background ==
Bob Marley, without Peter Tosh or Bunny Wailer, moved to Sweden to work with Johnny Nash, writing and composing songs for the soundtrack to the film Want So Much to Believe. From November to December 1971, Marley toured Great Britain with Nash. Under their CBS international arm, Columbia Records released the Nash-produced "Reggae on Broadway" as a single, which was intended to break Marley as a solo artist; the single instead "sank like a stone". After this solo tour, Marley returned to Jamaica, reuniting with Peter and Bunny. They came back to the UK to complete the tour and continue recording with CBS as a group. The sessions were abandoned because of clashes with Johnny Nash and Danny Sims about the process, causing the band to not have the funds to return to Jamaica, nor could they earn money due to work-permit restrictions. The group's London road manager, Brent Clarke, recommended they get in contact with Chris Blackwell from Island Records, who had released licensed singles by The Wailers from Studio One in Great Britain. Blackwell gave the group an advance of £4000 to help them get home to Jamaica, and to complete the recording of their next album.

== Recording ==
The album was recorded in 1972 at three different studios in Kingston, Jamaica – Dynamic Sound, Harry J's, and Randy's, respectively – on eight-track tape by engineer Sylvan Morris. According to Aston Barrett, "some of the songs had been recorded before ... in different studios and with different musicians, but we gave them that strict timing and brought the feeling out of them more." "Baby We've Got a Date (Rock It Baby)" is similar to "Black Bitter", recorded in an earlier session. The musicians consisted of Marley on vocals and acoustic guitar, Peter Tosh on vocals, guitar and keyboards, Bunny Wailer on backing vocals and bongos, Aston "Family Man" Barrett on bass, and Carlton Barrett on drums. In addition, Robbie Shakespeare played the bass on "Concrete Jungle" and "Stir It Up", Tyrone Downie played organ on "Concrete Jungle" and "Stir It Up", Winston Wright played organ on all other tracks, and Alvin "Seeco" Patterson played akete drums on several tracks. The female backing singing was performed by Rita Marley and her friend Marcia Griffiths. Tommy McCook played the flute.

In the winter of 1972, Marley flew back to London to present the master tapes to Chris Blackwell. CBS and Sims, with whom the band were already contracted, took Blackwell and the Island Records label to court over the recording. Island won the case, and received US$9,000 (about $72,700 in 2026) and two percent of royalties from the band's first six albums, while Sims received £5,000 and the publishing rights to the Wailers songs. Blackwell remixed the tracks at the Island Studios on Basing Street, and included overdubs. Muscle Shoals session guitarist Wayne Perkins, who at that time was recording a new Smith, Perkins & Smith album at the Island studio, recorded a guitar solo overdub for "Concrete Jungle", including the three-octave feedback at the end, slide guitar on "Baby We've Got a Date (Rock It Baby)", and the wah-wah-laced lead on "Stir It Up".

The songs' lyrics deal with political injustice towards blacks and poverty, as is the case in much of their musical output. Catch a Fire is about "the current state of urban poverty", and "Slave Driver" "connects the present to past injustices". However, politics are not the only theme; "Stir It Up", for example, is a love song. "Stir It Up", along with other Marley songs, was covered by Johnny Nash on the I Can See Clearly Now album, peaking at number 12 on the Billboard Hot 100 chart in 1973.

== Cover art ==
The original 1973 vinyl release, designed by graphic artists Rod Dyer and Bob Weiner, was enclosed in a sleeve depicting a Zippo lighter. The sleeve functioned like a real Zippo lighter case, opening at a side hinge to reveal the record within. Only the original pressing of 20,000 had the Zippo cover; because each cover had to be hand-riveted, which was not cost-effective, subsequent pressings had an alternative cover designed by John Bonis, featuring an Esther Anderson portrait of Marley smoking a "spliff", with the album now credited to Bob Marley and the Wailers. Shortly after the album's release, Jamaican police raided Anderson's house and seized the cover photo and film, which were never returned. Copies of the record from the original pressings have since become collector's items. The original cover art was reproduced in 2001 for the deluxe compact disc edition.

== Release ==
The first release from the album sessions was the "Baby We've Got a Date" single, released in early 1973 on Island's Blue Mountain subsidiary. Catch a Fire was released on 13 April 1973 on the Island label with a supporting tour. The album sold around 14,000 copies in its first weeks, and peaked at number 171 on the Billboard 200 chart and at number 51 on Billboard R&B chart.

Catch a Fire has been re-released under different recording labels with different track lengths. In 2001, a special collection edition was released containing the unreleased, non-overdubbed ("Jamaican") versions of the songs on the first side and the original, overdubbed album on the second side. Mobile Fidelity Sound Lab released an Ultradisc II version in 1995.

A documentary about the album, directed by Jeremy Marre, was released in 2000, featuring interviews with the musicians and engineers who worked on the album, archive performance footage, and home video footage filmed by members of the band.

== Tour ==
The album's supporting tour began in 1973 in the United Kingdom, and then moved to the United States. In England, they performed 19 shows at universities and clubs. While in London, the band performed on the BBC shows The Old Grey Whistle Test and Top Gear. The UK leg of the tour was the last time singer Bunny Wailer performed with The Wailers; the reason for his departure was his unhappiness with the record marketing and promotion process, which made touring outside Jamaica difficult, with contributing factors being the difficulty in finding food suitable to his strict Ital diet and other cultural clashes as a Rastafari. After Bunny's departure from the tour, Tosh consulted with Marley and finally picked Joe Higgs as a replacement. Blackwell hired the concert promoter Lee Jaffe to book gigs in North America. The Wailers performed at Paul's Mall in Boston and then three gigs in New York City, alongside Bruce Springsteen's E Street Band; in October, they opened for Sly and the Family Stone in Las Vegas. These concerts marked an important step towards international acknowledgement. The tensions surrounding the marketing, promotions and income from the tour continued, causing Peter Tosh to also depart. Back in Jamaica, the group agreed to pursue solo albums, and their early solo singles were released under their Tuff Gong Records company, based at 56 Hope Road in Kingston.

== Critical reception ==
"Concrete Jungle"
Concrete Jungle audio sample

Professional ratings
Review scores
Source	Rating
AllMusic	5/5 stars
Christgau's Record Guide	A
The Encyclopedia of Popular Music	5/5 stars
The Rolling Stone Album Guide	4.5/5 stars
Select	4/5 medals

The critical reception to Catch a Fire was positive. Village Voice critic Robert Christgau said "half these songs are worthy of St. John the Divine", and "Barrett brothers' bass and drums save those that aren't from limbo". Reviewers from Rolling Stone also praised the brothers' playing, concluding that "Catch a Fire is a blazing debut". According to the review, "'Concrete Jungle' and 'Slave Driver' crackle with streetwise immediacy, while 'Kinky Reggae' and 'Stir It Up' ... revel in the music's vast capacity for good-time skanking. 'Stop That Train' and '400 Years,' both written by Peter Tosh, indicate the original Wailers weren't strictly a one-man show".

Critics have called Catch a Fire one of the greatest reggae albums of all time. Vik Iyengar from AllMusic comments that "Marley would continue to achieve great critical and commercial success during the 1970s, but Catch a Fire is one of the finest reggae albums ever. This album is essential for any music collection". Rolling Stone ranked the album at number 123 on its list of 500 Greatest Albums of All Time, moving to 126 in a 2012 revised listing, the second highest placement for a reggae album; only Legend, ranked higher at number 46. It was later ranked at number 140 in the 2020 reboot of the list. Writing in The Spectator arts blog in 2012, David Rodigan described it as "quite simply, one of the greatest reggae albums ever made". The album was voted number 285 in the third edition of Colin Larkin's All Time Top 1000 Albums (2000).

== Track listing ==
All songs were written by Bob Marley, except where noted.

Side one
No.	Title	Writer(s)	Length
1.	"Concrete Jungle"		4:13
2.	"Slave Driver"		2:53
3.	"400 Years"	Peter Tosh	2:45
4.	"Stop That Train"	Tosh	3:54
5.	"Baby We've Got a Date (Rock It Baby)"		3:55

Side two
No.	Title	Length
6.	"Stir It Up"	5:33
7.	"Kinky Reggae"	3:37
8.	"No More Trouble"	3:58
9.	"Midnight Ravers"	5:08

The Definitive Remastered edition (2001)

bonus tracks
No.	Title	Length
10.	"High Tide or Low Tide"	4:44
11.	"All Day All Night"	3:29

Deluxe edition (2001)

Disc one: The Unreleased Original Jamaican Versions
No.	Title	Writer(s)	Length
1.	"Concrete Jungle"		4:11
2.	"Stir It Up"		3:37
3.	"High Tide or Low Tide"		4:40
4.	"Stop That Train"	Tosh	3:52
5.	"400 Years"	Tosh	2:57
6.	"Baby We've Got a Date (Rock It Baby)"		4:00
7.	"Midnight Ravers"		5:05
8.	"All Day All Night"		3:26
9.	"Slave Driver"		2:52
10.	"Kinky Reggae"		3:40
11.	"No More Trouble"		5:13

Disc two: The Released Album
No.	Title	Writer(s)	Length
1.	"Concrete Jungle"		4:13
2.	"Slave Driver"		2:54
3.	"400 Years"	Tosh	2:45
4.	"Stop That Train"	Tosh	3:54
5.	"Baby We've Got a Date (Rock It Baby)"		3:55
6.	"Stir It Up"		5:32
7.	"Kinky Reggae"		3:37
8.	"No More Trouble"		3:58
9.	"Midnight Ravers"		5:08

== Personnel ==
- Bob Marley – guitar, vocals
- Peter Tosh – organ, guitar, piano, vocals
- Bunny Wailer – bongos, conga, vocals
- Aston "Family Man" Barrett – bass guitar
- Carlton "Carlie" Barrett – drums
- Rita Marley – backing vocals
- Marcia Griffiths – backing vocals

Additional musicians

- John "Rabbit" Bundrick – keyboards, synthesizer, clavinet
- Wayne Perkins – guitar ("Concrete Jungle", "Baby We've Got a Date (Rock It Baby)", "Stir it Up")
- Robbie Shakespeare – bass guitar ("Concrete Jungle" and “Stir It Up”)
- Tommy McCook – flute
- Jean Alain Roussel – piano, keyboards
- Winston Wright – organ
- Francisco Willie Pep – percussion
- Chris Karan – percussion

Production

- Chris Blackwell – production
- The Wailers – production
- Carlton Lee – engineering
- Stu Barrett – engineering
- Tony Platt – engineering
- Bob Weiner – design
- Rod Dyer – design

== Charts ==
Chart performance for Catch a Fire
Chart (2024)	Peak position
Belgian Albums (Ultratop Flanders)	164
