= Every Little Thing (Eric Clapton song) =

Single by Eric Clapton

from the album Old Sock
- Released: May 31, 2013
- Genre: Pop rock, reggae fusion
- Length: 4:35
- Label: Polydor
- Songwriter(s): Bramhall II · Costa · Stanley
- Producer(s): Simon Climie

Eric Clapton singles chronology
"I Ain't Gonna Stand for It" (2001)	"Every Little Thing" (2013)

"Every Little Thing" is a reggae pop song written by Doyle Bramhall II, Nikka Costa and Justin Stanley. It was recorded by the British rock musician Eric Clapton for his 2013 studio album Old Sock. As single release featuring the non-album track "No Sympathy" and remixes of the title by Damian and Stephen Marley.

== Composition ==
In the track-by-track Old Sock interview from 2013, Clapton recalls that the song was written for him to sing and perform it in front of his family. He goes on to say, that the song is also actually about his own family. Originally, Bramhall II was writing the song from the inspiration he got, while meeting with Clapton's family members at home. Clapton later on decided, since the track is about his wife and children, that they should sing on the recording as well. Clapton himself recalls the title as "lovely", but noted, that it is "not the kinda thing [he] would write".

== Release ==
The title was released via the Old Sock studio album on March 12, 2013. Both the single and album versions of the song were released under Polydor Records for worldwide territories. The single was released as a digital download edition and as a limited twelve inch maxi vinyl single. The gramophone record pressings were limited to 2500 copies worldwide. The digital download edition only consists of the two remixes by Marley, not the bonus track nor the original album version can be downloaded. The song was released with the following publishing credits of Ain't No Free administered by Bug Music, Crysalis, Soundhustler, Green & Bloom and Can'tneverdidnothing, which are all sub-publishing companies of BMG Music International.

== Critical reception ==
Rolling Stone critic Will Hermes calls "Every Little Thing" a "love-is-all-you-need anthem that trots out the Clapton kids and feels like an iPhone slide-show soundtrack". Music journalist Richard MacDougall from Blues Rock Review thinks, the song is a "focal point" alongside "Gotta Get Over" on the Old Sock studio release and "starts in off in a little more of a sober vein" then the other rock orientated other track. Finishing his review, MacDougall recalls, that when Clapton's "gospel choir rejoins and fires off, the catchiest hook of the record [is "Every Little Thing]". The journalist rates the track under his Top Five "can't miss this" tracks. AllMusic critic Stephen Thomas Erlewine calls the track a "cheerful lite reggae bounce".

== Chart positions ==
Chart (2013)	Peak position
US Adult Contemporary (Billboard)	26
