= At His Best =

At His Best may refer to:

== Albums ==
- Bob Marley at His Best
- Eric Clapton at His Best
- Ginger Baker at His Best
- Lou Donaldson at His Best 1966
- Mario! Lanza at His Best 1995
- Rodriguez at His Best
