= Old Sock =

Studio album by Eric Clapton
- Released: 12 March 2013
- Recorded: 2012–2013
- Genre: Rock, blues, reggae
- Length: 57:27
- Label: Surfdog/Duck Records/ADA (U.S.)/Polydor (EU)
- Producer: Eric Clapton, Doyle Bramhall II, Justin Stanley, Simon Climie

Eric Clapton chronology
Play the Blues: Live from Jazz at Lincoln Center (2011)	Old Sock (2013)	The Breeze: An Appreciation of JJ Cale (2014)

Professional ratings
Aggregate scores
Source	Rating
AnyDecentMusic?	5.1/10
Metacritic	58/100
Review scores
Source	Rating
Allmusic	3.5/5 stars
American Songwriter	4/5 stars
Exclaim!	3/10
The Independent	2/5 stars
The Independent on Sunday	3/5 stars
London Evening Standard	3/5 stars
musicOMH	2.5/5 stars
The Observer	1/5 stars
Popmatters	5/10
Rolling Stone	3/5 stars

Old Sock is the nineteenth solo studio album by Eric Clapton. It includes the two new compositions "Gotta Get Over" and "Every Little Thing", as well as covers. Several notable musicians were involved in the album, including Steve Winwood, JJ Cale and Paul McCartney.

== Background ==
Old Sock includes two new compositions ("Gotta Get Over" and "Every Little Thing"), and covers of some of his favourite songs from childhood to the current day. Several notable musicians were involved in the album, including Steve Winwood, JJ Cale and Paul McCartney. This is Cale's final major recorded contribution before his death in July 2013. It reached No. 11 in the UK Album Chart and No. 7 in the U.S.

Clapton previously considered naming the album 50 Years of Drift in an Open Tuning, a homage to the Derek Taylor book 50 Years Adrift (In An Open Necked Shirt). He was inspired to name the album Old Sock from a conversation with David Bowie. After hearing Bowie's then-new song "Where Are We Now?", Clapton sent a note thanking him "for writing such a beautiful song". Bowie responded, "Thanks for the shoutout, old sock. Really appreciate it." Bowie allowed Clapton to use the phrase for his album title and share the story of their conversation. Following Bowie's death in 2016, Clapton wrote "Sweet dreams old sock" on his Facebook account.

The album cover is a selfie Clapton took with his iPhone while on holiday in Antigua.

== Track listing ==
No.	Title	Writer(s)	Length
1.	"Further On Down the Road" (featuring Taj Mahal)	Taj Mahal, Jesse E. Davis	5:42
2.	"Angel" (featuring J.J. Cale)	J. J. Cale	3:53
3.	"The Folks Who Live on the Hill"	Oscar Hammerstein II, Jerome Kern	3:44
4.	"Gotta Get Over" (featuring Chaka Khan)	Doyle Bramhall II, Justin Stanley, Nikka Costa	4:36
5.	"Till Your Well Runs Dry"	Peter Tosh	4:40
6.	"All of Me" (featuring Paul McCartney)	Gerald Marks, Seymour Simons	3:22
7.	"Born to Lose"	Ted Daffan	4:01
8.	"Still Got the Blues" (featuring Steve Winwood)	Gary Moore	5:52
9.	"Goodnight Irene"	Huddie Ledbetter, John A. Lomax	4:20
10.	"Your One and Only Man"	Otis Redding	4:27
11.	"Every Little Thing"	Doyle Bramhall II, Justin Stanley, Nikka Costa	4:31
12.	"Our Love Is Here to Stay"	George Gershwin, Ira Gershwin	4:11

Bonus Track
No.	Title	Writer(s)	Length
13.	"No Sympathy"	Tosh	4:08

== Personnel ==
- Eric Clapton – lead vocals, electric guitar, acoustic guitar, 12-string guitar, dobro, mandolin
- Doyle Bramhall II – electric guitar, acoustic guitar, slide guitar, mandolin, backing vocals
- Greg Leisz – pedal steel guitar, mandolin
- Taj Mahal – banjo and harmonica on "Further on Down the Road"
- J. J. Cale – guitar and vocals on "Angel"
- Tim Carmon – Hammond B3 organ
- Simon Climie – acoustic piano, percussion
- Frank Marocco – accordion
- Walt Richmond – upright piano, keyboards
- Matt Rollings – keyboards
- Chris Stainton – clavinet, Fender Rhodes, acoustic piano, Hammond B3 organ
- Justin Stanley – clavinet, Mellotron, drums
- Steve Winwood – Hammond B3 organ on "Still Got the Blues"
- Willie Weeks – bass guitar, upright bass
- Paul McCartney – upright bass and backing vocals on "All of Me"
- Matt Chamberlain – drums
- Steve Gadd – drums
- Jim Keltner – drums
- Abe Laboriel Jr. – drums
- Henry Spinetti – drums
- Gabe Witcher – fiddle
- Stephen "Doc" Kupka – baritone saxophone
- Joseph Sublett – tenor saxophone
- Nicholas Lane – trombone
- Sal Cracchiolo – trumpet
- Nick Ingman – string arrangements and conductor
- Isobel Griffiths – strings contractor
- Perry Montague-Mason – strings leader
- Thomas Bowes – strings leader
- Sharon White – backing vocals
- Michelle John – backing vocals
- Chaka Khan – guest vocals on "Gotta Get Over"
- Julie Clapton – guest vocals
- Ella Clapton – guest vocals
- Sophie Clapton – guest vocals
- Nikka Costa – guest vocals
- Wendy Moten – guest vocals
- Lisa Vaughan – guest vocals

== Production ==
- Producers – Doyle Bramhall II, Eric Clapton, Simon Climie and Justin Stanley.
- Recorded by Simon Climie, Alan Douglas, Steve Price and Justin Stanley.
- Assistant Engineers – Nick Cervonaro, Martin Cooke, Fiona Cruickshank, Joel Evenden, Alex Graupera, Joe Kearns, Paul LaMalfa, Kevin Mills, Harry Rutherford and Kyle Stevens.
- Mixed by Simon Climie
- Recorded at Air Lyndhurst Hall and Angel Recording Studios (London, England).
- Mastered by Bob Ludwig at Gateway Mastering (Portland, ME).
- Production Coordinator and Musician Contactors – Debbie Johnson and Shari Sutcliffe.
- Cover and Photography by Eric Clapton
- Design – Catherine Roylance, Noiseland Industries.

== Charts and certifications ==
=== Weekly charts ===
Chart (2013–14)	Peak position
Australian Albums (ARIA)	22
Austrian Albums (Ö3 Austria)	7
Belgian Albums (Ultratop Flanders)	16
Belgian Albums (Ultratop Wallonia)	11
Canadian Albums (Billboard)	12
Croatian International Albums (HDU)	1
Czech Albums (ČNS IFPI)	7
Danish Albums (Hitlisten)	9
Dutch Albums (Album Top 100)	7
Finnish Albums (Suomen virallinen lista)	19
French Albums (SNEP)	21
German Albums (Offizielle Top 100)	5
Greek Albums (IFPI)	24
Hungarian Albums (MAHASZ)	30
Irish Albums (IRMA)	22
Italian Albums (FIMI)	11
Japanese Albums (Oricon)	15
South Korean Albums (Circle)	32
New Zealand Albums (RMNZ)	11
Norwegian Albums (VG-lista)	7
Polish Albums (ZPAV)	13
Scottish Albums (OCC)	16
Slovenian Albums (SLO Top 30)	8
Spanish Albums (PROMUSICAE)	11
Swedish Albums (Sverigetopplistan)	14
Swiss Albums (Schweizer Hitparade)	11
UK Albums (OCC)	13
UK Album Downloads (OCC)	45
US Billboard 200	7
US Digital Albums (Billboard)	20
US Independent Albums (Billboard)	1
US Top Album Sales (Billboard)	7
US Top Rock Albums (Billboard)	3
US Indie Store Album Sales (Billboard)	4

=== Year-end charts ===
Chart (2013)	Position
Argentinian Albums (CAPIF)	77
Austrian Albums (Ö3 Austria)	130
Belgian Albums (Ultratop Flanders)	170
Belgian Albums (Ultratop Wallonia)	130
Danish Albums (Hitlisten)	56
German Albums (Offizielle Top 100)	112
Swiss Albums (Schweizer Hitparade)	196
UK Albums (OCC)	172
US Independent Albums (Billboard)	18
US Top Rock Albums (Billboard)	52

=== Certifications ===
Region	Certification	Certified units/sales
Japan	—	27,035
