= Funkstar De Luxe =

Danish house producer and remixer (born 1973)

- Born: Martin Aulkjær Ottesen; 1973 (age 52–53)
- Origin: Odense, Denmark
- Genres: Electronic dance music, house
- Occupations: Producer, remixer
- Years active: 1999–present
- Website: funkstardeluxe.com

Funkstar De Luxe (born Martin Aulkjær Ottesen in 1973) is a Danish house producer and remixer. He is best known for his million-selling reworking of Bob Marley's "Sun Is Shining".

== Work ==
Funkstar was first exposed to Marley's music as a teenage keyboardist in an amateur reggae band. "Sun Is Shining" was a worldwide hit reaching the top 20 in nine countries including No. 3 on the UK Singles Chart. Bob Marley vs. Funkstar De Luxe was also awarded World's Best-Selling Reggae Artist/Group at the 2000 World Music Awards.

Longtime Marley manager Chris Blackwell hurried to release his own remixes, but Funkstar had already moved on and had another hit with a remix of Marley's "Rainbow Country." He has since recorded other remixes for artists including Tom Jones, Mary J. Blige, Grace Jones, and Barry White, the most notable of which appeared on "Keep on Movin: It's Too Funky in Here". In 2003, Funkstar released an album of his own material, "Funkturistic". His track "When I Think of You" got a remix by SASH! In 2004.

Dubbed "The Danish King of the Remix" by AllMusic, after two sabbaticals away from the music industry during the 2000s, Funkstar returned to the scene in 2013 charting with a remix of Kim Wilde's "You Keep Me Hanging On". In 2014, his long-time label Lifted House released a rework of his Marley hit "Sun Is Shining – 15th Anniversary", which reached No. 1 on the UK Dance Chart.

His 2015 single "Million Miles" featured Michael Jackson collaborator Geoffrey Williams. The single reached No. 8 on the British Dance Chart and spent ten weeks in the UK Dance Top 20.

== Discography ==
=== Albums ===
- Keep On Moving (1999)
- Keep On Moving (It's Too Funky in Here) (2000)
- I'm a Rainbow Too (2000)
- Funkturistic (2002)

=== Singles ===
List of singles, with selected chart positions
Title	Year	Peak chart positions													Certifications	Album
Title	Year	DEN	BEL	CAN	FRA	GER	IRE	NLD	NOR	NZL	SWE	SWI	UK	US Dance	Certifications	Album
"Sun Is Shining" (vs. Bob Marley)	1999	—	7	3	12	19	7	11	8	11	17	7	3	1	UK: Silver	Keep On Moving (It's Too Funky in Here)
"Rainbow Country" (vs. Bob Marley)	1999	—	58	12	78	47	28	78	—	27	40	54	11	—		Keep On Moving (It's Too Funky in Here)
"Let the Music Play" (vs. Barry White)	2000	—	24	—	39	—	—	91	—	—	—	92	—	—		Single only
"Sunshine Reggae" (vs. Laid Back)	2000	—	—	—	—	68	—	35	—	—	—	64	—	—		Single only
"Walkin' in the Name" (vs. Terry Maxx)	2000	—	—	—	—	—	—	—	—	—	—	—	42	—		Keep On Moving (It's Too Funky in Here)
"Pull Up to the Bumper" (vs. Grace Jones)	2000	—	—	—	—	—	—	—	—	—	—	—	60	4		Keep On Moving (It's Too Funky in Here)
"Blinded by the Light" (with Manfred Mann's Earth Band)	2002	2	—	—	—	—	—	—	—	—	—	—	—	—		Funkturistic
"Saturday"	2003	—	—	—	—	—	—	—	—	—	—	—	—	—		Funkturistic
"Easy"	2003	—	—	—	—	—	—	—	—	—	—	—	—	—		Funkturistic
"When I Think of You"	2004	13	—	—	—	—	—	—	—	—	—	—	—	—		Singles only
"She's a Lady" (vs. Tom Jones feat. DJ the Wave)	2004	—	—	—	—	—	—	—	—	—	—	96	—	—		Singles only
"Itch It Up"	2004	—	—	—	—	—	—	—	—	—	—	—	—	—		Singles only
"So Invincible" (feat. Kristine Blond)	2008	—	—	—	—	—	—	—	—	—	—	—	—	—		
"You Keep Me Hangin' On" (feat. Kim Wilde)	2013	—	—	—	—	—	—	—	—	—	—	—	—	—		
"Sun Is Shining (15th Anniversary)"	2014	—	—	—	—	—	—	—	—	—	—	—	—	—		
"Million Miles" (feat. Geoffrey Williams)	2015	—	—	—	—	—	—	—	—	—	—	—	—	—		
"—" denotes a recording that did not chart or was not released in that territory.

== See also ==
- List of number-one dance hits (United States)
- List of artists who reached number one on the US Dance chart
