= Lately (Stevie Wonder song) =

1981 single by Stevie Wonder

Single by Stevie Wonder

from the album Hotter than July
- B-side: "If It's Magic"
- Released: 1981
- Genre: R&B; soul
- Length: 4:05
- Label: Tamla
- Songwriter: Stevie Wonder
- Producer: Stevie Wonder

Stevie Wonder singles chronology
"I Ain't Gonna Stand for It" (1980)	"Lately" (1981)	"Happy Birthday" (1981)

"Lately" is a song by American singer, songwriter and musician Stevie Wonder, recorded for his nineteenth studio album, Hotter than July (1980). It is a piano ballad about a woman's infidelity. The song was released in 1981 by Tamla, reaching number three on the UK Singles Chart and number 64 on the US Billboard Hot 100.

In 1993, R&B group Jodeci released a gospel-infused cover of the song. Their rendition surpassed Wonder's in chart performance and became the group's biggest hit, peaking at number four on the Billboard Hot 100. Wonder joined the group in their performance of the song in The Arsenio Hall Show. Jodeci won the Soul Train Music Award for Best R&B/Soul Single – Group, Band or Duo for their version.

== Composition ==
"Lately" is a piano ballad, reminiscent of Wonder's previous ones such as "Never Dreamed You'd Leave in Summer". In the song, Wonder "voices sexual suspicion", recounting his female lover's infidelity. Wonder sings in a somewhat restrained manner until the 3 minute and 10 second mark, at which his voice becomes stronger, seemingly "on the verge of breaking down into utter despair."

== Critical reception ==
In 1981, Record World described "Lately" as touching and "perhaps his most beautiful, revealing work yet." Retrospectively, Hanif Abdurraqib of Pitchfork in 2022 described the song as "a classic Wonder ballad, the artist and piano and a palpable sense of longing (forgettable to me, but only because of Wonder's singular ability to pull this type of song off in various ways throughout his career).", while Jason Elias at AllMusic stated that unlike some of Wonder's similar material, "Lately" in particular hit all the perfect emotional and musical notes, and that the song is "enough to make a listener fall prey to an old-fashioned cry." He concluded his review saying "for anyone who is unclear of Wonder's greatness, this track is the proof."

== Personnel ==
- Stevie Wonder – lead vocals, bass synthesizer, piano

== Charts ==
Chart (1981)	Peak position
Australia (Kent Music Report)	17
Ireland (IRMA)	6
Netherlands (Single Top 100)	36
New Zealand (Recorded Music NZ)	15
UK Singles (Official Charts)	3
US Billboard Hot 100	64
US Adult Contemporary (Billboard)	33
US Hot R&B/Hip-Hop Songs (Billboard)	29
West Germany (GfK)	64

Chart (2013)	Peak position
South Korea International (Circle)	55

== Certifications ==
Region	Certification	Certified units/sales
United Kingdom (BPI)	Silver	250,000^{^}
^{^} Shipments figures based on certification alone.

== Jodeci version ==
"Lately"

Single by Jodeci

from the album Uptown MTV Unplugged
- Released: May 25, 1993
- Recorded: 1993
- Studio: Hit Factory (New York); Right Track (New York)
- Genre: R&B; soul
- Length: 5:49 (MTV Unplugged version); 6:23 (studio version); 4:23 (radio edit)
- Label: Uptown; MCA
- Songwriter: Stevie Wonder
- Producer: DeVante Swing

Jodeci singles chronology
"Let's Go Through the Motions" (1993)	"Lately" (1993)	"Cry For You" (1993)

Music video
- "Lately" on YouTube

R&B group Jodeci recorded "Lately" live for Uptown MTV Unplugged, which aired in May 1993. Released as a promotional single alongside a studio version, the cover became their biggest hit, surpassing Wonder's in chart performance and winning them a Soul Train Music award for Best R&B/Soul Single. Wonder joined the group during a performance of the song in The Arsenio Hall Show.

=== Background and composition ===
External image
- A still of a shirtless K-Ci in Jodeci's Unplugged performance of "Lately".

While planning the 1993 MTV Unplugged special intended to showcase the roster of Uptown Records, the label's founder Andre Harrell asked Jodeci to perform Wonder's song on the special in the 24 hours before it was recorded; Harrell bought the compact disc of Wonder's record and played it for them. Jodeci agreed and they learned the song afterwards. The special aired on May 31, 1993.

The Unplugged version is a live recording, with only members K-Ci and JoJo on the vocals. Tom Breihan of Stereogum described Jodeci's Unplugged cover as a "tender old school love-song" that was "a bit atypical of the group", performed with gospel's "passionate theatricality". Jon Caramanica of The New York Times stated that K-Ci and JoJo followed Wonder's build up to the final moment where his heretofore restrained vocals become intensified, but the two also put in the "sober ecstasy of gospel". AllMusic's Jason Elias stated that the group kept the "inherent sadness of the music" and "added even more pain and volume suitable to the words."

The group also recorded a studio version. It was titled "Lately (Main)". Spanning six minutes, that version was produced by member DeVante Swing and featured an additional outro. It was recorded on Hit Factory and Right Track in New York. Jodeci's "Lately" was released as a single for cassette on May 25, 1993, and for vinyl on June 22, 1993. The studio versions were released only on the single, and were not included in the Uptown MTV Unplugged album. Reissues of Jodeci's album Diary of a Mad Band featured the shorter four-minute radio edit of the studio version.

=== Critical reception ===
Elias Leight for Rolling Stone stated that "Jodeci always excelled at slow tempos, and their “Lately” lingers wonderfully." Rashad Grove of BET called Jodeci's cover "arguably the best rendition of a Stevie Wonder composition." In The New York Times, Caramanica stated that K-Ci and JoJo "lovingly annihilated Wonder's original", and that "there is no other version of the song that matters." Caramanica also said that sometimes Jodeci's Unplugged recording of "Lately" is his "absolute favorite piece of music": "Vocal brilliance, mature restraint, vigorous performance, supreme confidence — it would be a master class if anyone were able to study it, learn from it and replicate it." On the other hand, a review of the Uptown MTV Unplugged special on its airdate from The Baltimore Sun stated "their rendition of Stevie Wonder’s “Lately” is wonderfully heartfelt, though occasionally oversung."

=== Live performances ===
Since Uptown MTV Unplugged, the group has performed the song numerous times. In their performance of the song in The Arsenio Hall Show in 1993, host Arsenio Hall brought out Wonder to join them. Wonder added ad libs, including one where he sang, "I like the way you sing my song.” On their performance with Wonder, JoJo stated: "That just let us know, ‘Yes, Jodeci is somebody.' We cried like newborn babies." In 2002, K-Ci and JoJo performed it for Wonder on BET's 8th Annual Walk of Fame Honoring Stevie Wonder.

=== Cultural impact ===
Released as a promotional single, Jodeci's cover became the group's biggest hit, succeeding the chart performance of Wonder's original. The cover reached numbers four and seven on the Billboard Hot 100 and Cash Box Top 100 in August 1993. On the US Billboard Hot R&B/Hip-Hop Singles & Tracks chart, the cover spent weeks on the number one spot, making the cover the group's fourth number one R&B hit. Having topped the charts for 13 weeks, executive producer Andre Harrell referred to it as their "End of the Road", analogous to the chart-topping single for Boyz II Men. It sold 900,000 copies and was certified gold by the Recording Industry Association of America.

Caramanica in The New York Times described the Unplugged performance as having become iconic. Jodeci's "Lately" was parodied in the sketch comedy television series In Living Color and featured in the sitcom Martin.

=== Accolades ===
At the 1994 Soul Train Music Awards, Jodeci won Best R&B/Soul Single – Group, Band or Duo for their cover of "Lately".

=== Music video ===
In the black and white music video, Jodeci performs the song in an empty high rise room with a view of the city at night. DeVante Swing plays piano and Mr. Dalvin drums, while K-Ci and JoJo sing. Later, K-Ci raises his arms, and the video transitions to the room at daytime. The video ends with a fade to black after JoJo waves goodbye to the camera.

=== Credits and personnel ===
Adapted from the vinyl back cover.

==== Uptown MTV Unplugged ====
- Produced by Alex Coletti and directed by Beth McCarthy for MTV

==== Main version ====
- Produced by DeVante Swing for Swing Mob Productions, Inc.
- Recorded by Paul Logus
- Assistant recording engineer – Louis Alfred
- Mixed by Greggg Mann
- Assistant mix engineer – Troy Hightower

==== Extended live version ====
- Produced "live" by DeVante Swing for Swing Mob Productions, Inc.
- Additional live production – Swing Mob for Swing Mob Productions, Inc.
- Executive producer – Andre Harrell

=== Track listing ===
==== Cassette ====
Adapted from the back cover.

Program One
No.	Title	Length
1.	"Lately"

Program Two
No.	Title	Length
1.	"Lately (Album Version)"

==== Vinyl ====
Adapted from the back cover.

Side A
No.	Title	Length
1.	"Lately (Main)"	6:20
2.	"Lately (TV Track)"	6:20

Side B
No.	Title	Length
1.	"Lately (Extended Live)"	5:06

==== CD ====
Adapted from the back cover.

No.	Title	Length
1.	"Lately (Radio)"	4:23
2.	"Lately (Main)"	6:23
3.	"Lately (World Beat Peace Remix)"	6:24

==== CD Maxi-Single ====
Adapted from the back cover.

No.	Title	Length
1.	"Lately (Radio)"	4:20
2.	"Lately (Main)"	6:20
3.	"Lately (TV Track)"	6:20
4.	"Lately (Extended Live)"	5:06
5.	"Lately (World Beat Peace Remix)"	6:20

=== Charts ===
==== Weekly charts ====
Chart (1993)	Peak position
Australia (ARIA)	161
New Zealand (Recorded Music NZ)	50
US Billboard Hot 100	4
US Hot Dance Singles Sales (Billboard)	12
US Hot R&B/Hip-Hop Songs (Billboard)	1
US Pop Airplay (Billboard)	17
US Rhythmic Airplay (Billboard)	1
US Cash Box Top 100	7

==== Year-end charts ====
Chart (1993)	Position
US Billboard Hot 100	15
US Cash Box Top 100	8

=== Certifications ===
Region	Certification	Certified units/sales
United States (RIAA)	Gold	500,000^{^}
^{^} Shipments figures based on certification alone.

== See also ==
- List of number-one R&B singles of 1993 (U.S.)
- "Lately", a song by S Club 7 (a cover of the Stevie Wonder song), a B-side of the 2001 single "Don't Stop Movin'" also features on the group's album, 7 and Motown Mania
