= Burnin' (Bob Marley and the Wailers album) =

Studio album by the Wailers
- Released: 19 October 1973
- Recorded: Spring 1973
- Studios: Harry J. (Kingston); Island (London)
- Genre: Reggae
- Length: 38:28
- Labels: Island; Tuff Gong
- Producers: Chris Blackwell; The Wailers

The Wailers chronology
African Herbsman (1973)	Burnin' (1973)	Rasta Revolution (1974)

Singles from Burnin'
- 1. "I Shot the Sheriff" Released: 12 February 1973; 2. "Get Up, Stand Up" Released: 14 September 1973

Professional ratings
Review scores
Source	Rating
AllMusic	5/5 stars
Christgau's Record Guide	A
Select	4/5 medals

Burnin' is the sixth album by Jamaican reggae group the Wailers (also known as Bob Marley and the Wailers), released in October 1973. It was written by all three members and recorded and produced by the Wailers in Jamaica, contemporaneously with tracks from the Catch a Fire album with further recording, mixing and completion while on the Catch a Fire tour in London. It contains the song "I Shot the Sheriff". It was the last album before Marley, Peter Tosh and Bunny Wailer decided to pursue solo careers, while continuing their local releases through their company Tuff Gong Records. A commercial and critical success in the United States, Burnin' was certified Gold and later added to the National Recording Registry, with the Library of Congress deeming it historically and culturally significant.

== Recording ==
The album was recorded at Harry J's studio in Kingston, Jamaica, with the Wailers producing. It was mixed and overdubbed by Chris Blackwell at Island Records' Basing Street studios in London during the spring of 1973 while the band were touring in support of their previous album, Catch a Fire.

== Music and lyrics ==
Burnin' opens with one of The Wailers' best known songs, the call to action "Get Up, Stand Up" and includes a more confrontational and militant tone than previous records, such as in another Wailers standard turned into a number one hit by Eric Clapton, "I Shot the Sheriff". The songs "Duppy Conqueror", "Small Axe", and "Put It On" are re-recordings of songs previously released on their co productions with Lee Perry's Upsetters Label.

== Critical reception ==
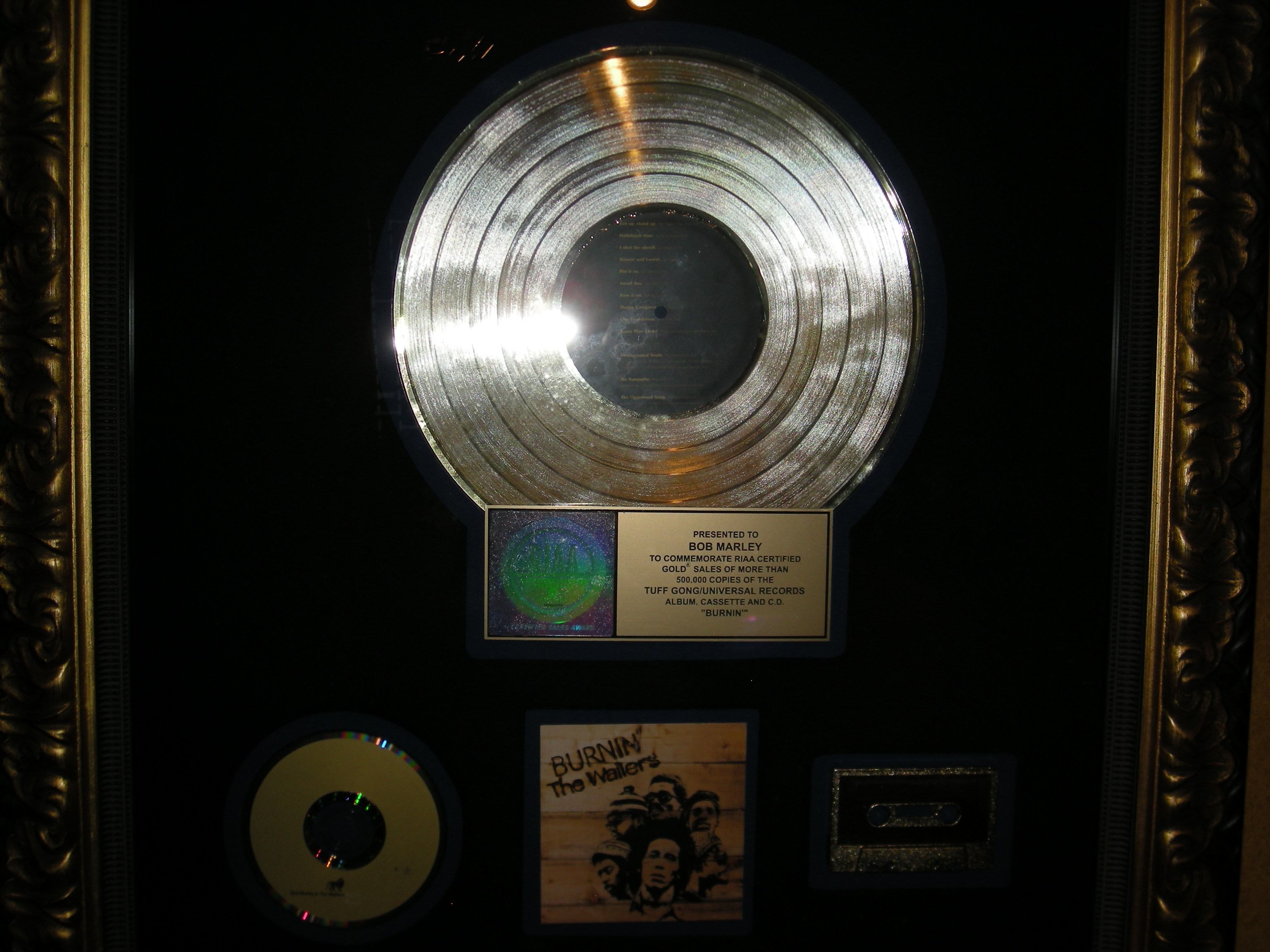
The Wailers' gold record award for Burnin' in Nine Mile, Jamaica

Reviewing in Christgau's Record Guide: Rock Albums of the Seventies (1981), Robert Christgau wrote: "This is as perplexing as it is jubilant—sometimes gripping, sometimes slippery. It's reggae, obviously, but it's not mainstream reggae, certainly not rock or soul, maybe some kind of futuristic slow funk, War without the pseudo-jazz. What's inescapable is The Wailers’ ferocious gift for melodic propaganda. It's one thing to come up with four consecutive title hooks, another to make the titles 'Get Up Stand Up,' 'Hallelujah Time,' 'I Shot the Sheriff,' 'Burnin' and Lootin'.'"

In 2003, the album was ranked number 319 on Rolling Stone magazine's list of the 500 greatest albums of all time. The album maintained the same position in a 2012 update of the list.

In 2007 the album was added to the Library of Congress' National Recording Registry for its historical and cultural significance.

== Track listing ==
Side one
No.	Title	Writer(s)	Length
1.	"Get Up, Stand Up"	Bob Marley, Peter Tosh	3:15
2.	"Hallelujah Time"	Jean Watt	3:27
3.	"I Shot the Sheriff"	Marley	4:39
4.	"Burnin' and Lootin'"	Marley	4:11
5.	"Put It On"	Marley	3:58

Side two
No.	Title	Writer(s)	Length
1.	"Small Axe"	Marley	4:00
2.	"Pass It On"	Jean Watt	3:32
3.	"Duppy Conqueror"	Marley	3:44
4.	"One Foundation"	Tosh	3:44
5.	"Rasta Man Chant"	Traditional; arranged by Marley, Tosh, Livingston	3:43

- Sides one and two were combined as tracks 1–10 on CD reissues.

The Definitive Remastered edition (2001)

Bonus tracks
No.	Title	Writer(s)	Length
11.	"Reincarnated Souls" (b-side of "Concrete Jungle")	Jean Watt	4:01
12.	"No Sympathy" (previously unreleased)	Tosh	3:08
13.	"The Oppressed Song" (previously unreleased)	Livingston	3:16

Text from 12 June 2001 Tuff Gong cat 314 548 894-2 CD liner notes:

- bonus tracks 11–13 recorded during Burnin' sessions at Harry J. Studios, Kingston
- track 11: originally issued 29 May 1973 b-side of "Concrete Jungle"; Island WIP cat 6164
- tracks 12 and 13: previously unreleased

Deluxe edition (2004)

Disc one: Burnin' remastered (bonus tracks)
No.	Title	Writer(s)	Length
14.	"Get Up, Stand Up" (unreleased alternate take)	Marley, Tosh	3:42
15.	"Get Up, Stand Up" (unreleased single version)	Marley, Tosh	3:11

Disc two: Live at Leeds, 23 November 1973
No.	Title	Writer(s)	Length
1.	"Duppy Conqueror"	Marley	6:03
2.	"Slave Driver"	Marley	4:59
3.	"Burnin' and Lootin'"	Marley	8:29
4.	"Can't Blame the Youth"	Tosh	5:08
5.	"Stop That Train"	Tosh	3:57
6.	"Midnight Ravers"	Marley	6:29
7.	"No More Trouble"	Marley	6:59
8.	"Kinky Reggae"	Marley	5:56
9.	"Get Up, Stand Up"	Marley, Tosh	6:15
10.	"Stir It Up"	Marley	7:25
11.	"Put It On"	Marley	4:29
12.	"Lively Up Yourself"	Marley	13:35

== Personnel ==
Musicians

- Bob Marley – guitar, vocals
- Peter Tosh – guitar, keyboards, vocals
- Bunny Wailer – percussion, vocals
- Aston "Family Man" Barrett – bass guitar, additional lead guitar on "I Shot the Sheriff"
- Carlton "Carlie" Barrett – drums
- Earl Lindo – keyboards, vocals

Additional musician and production staff

- John "Rabbit" Bundrick – overdubbed keyboards
- The Wailers and Chris Blackwell – producer
- Tony Platt – engineer
- Phill Brown – engineer

Artwork

- CCS London
- Bob Bowkett
- Simon Perfitt
- Ester Anderson – photography

== Charts ==
Chart performance for Burnin'
Chart (1975)	Peak position
US Billboard 200	151
US Black Albums	41
