= Satisfy My Soul (song) =

1978 single by Bob Marley and the Wailers

Single by Bob Marley and the Wailers

from the album Soul Revolution Part II and Kaya
- B-side: "Smile Jamaica"
- Released: 26 May 1978
- Recorded: 1970 (original version),1977 (Kaya version)
- Studio: Island Studios, London, England
- Genre: Reggae
- Length: 4:30 (album version); 3:50 (single version)
- Label: Upsetter Records (original), Tuff Gong, Island
- Songwriter(s): Bob Marley

Bob Marley and the Wailers singles chronology
"Blackman Redemption" (1978)	"Satisfy My Soul" (1978)	"Rastaman Live Up" (1978)

Music video
- "Satisfy My Soul" on YouTube

"Satisfy My Soul" is a song by Bob Marley and the Wailers, it was originally recorded in 1970 as "Don't Rock My Boat" before being re-recorded in 1977 and then released in 1978 as a single for their album Kaya being released that year. It peaked at number 21 in the UK charts upon its release. The song became one of the most well-known Marley songs and was included on the Legend compilation.

== Music video ==
A music video for the song was uploaded in YouTube on April 24, 2019.

== Charts ==
Chart (1978)	Peak position
UK Singles (OCC)	21

== Certifications ==
Region	Certification	Certified units/sales
New Zealand (RMNZ)	Platinum	30,000^{‡}
United Kingdom (BPI)	Silver	200,000^{‡}
^{‡} Sales+streaming figures based on certification alone.
