= Lee Jaffe =

American artist (born 1950)

- Born: 1950 (age 74–75); New York City, U.S.
- Occupation: Artist
- Relatives: Mia Goth (granddaughter)

Lee Jaffe (born 1950) is an American artist, photographer, filmmaker, musician, and producer. His granddaughter is actress Mia Goth.

== Life and work ==
=== Early life ===
Born in the Bronx to a Jewish family, Jaffe grew up in New York City. Having fulfilled his high school requirements at the age of sixteen, Jaffe left New York to attend Penn State University, where he studied American history and literature, art history, and modern philosophy.

=== Early films and conceptual art ===
Jaffe left Penn State at the age of 19, returned briefly to New York where he played harmonica and guitar in various bands, and then picked up suddenly and moved to Brazil. Through the music scene there, he was introduced into a circle of friends making experimental films. There, he directed such films as the 16 mm film Nine Ways of Dying, created in the remote mountains of Brazil. Jaffe became close to the influential Brazilian filmmaker Neville d’Almeida and the artist Hélio Oiticica, with whom he collaborated in the April 1970 exhibition “From Body to Earth” in Belo Horizonte.

When Jaffe returned in New York in 1971, he continued making films, such as Impact, with the conceptual artist Vito Acconci, and Brooklyn Bridge, with Gordon Matta-Clark. In 1971, he also participated in the landmark conceptual exhibition “Projects: Pier 18” for the Museum of Modern Art, New York, curated by Willoughby Sharp.

=== Music career and sojourn in Jamaica ===
In 1972, while working with Island Records, he met Bob Marley in a hotel room in New York. He followed Marley back to Jamaica on what was originally a two-week vacation, but ended up staying for the next five years. Jaffe lived with Marley, managing the Wailers, playing harmonica on the album Natty Dread, and organizing their North American tour. In Jamaica, Jaffe also met Peter Tosh, and he produced his album Legalize It and shot the iconic cover in 1977.

=== Turn to painting ===
Jaffe moved back to New York in 1977, while still working with Peter Tosh. In 1983 Jaffe turned to painting. His works have been characterized as “large scale, multi-media historical assemblage.” Through his work, he has explored various themes of marginalization in American history, such as “the exploitation of the black performer in America, the cruelty of the fur industry, the relationship of the Native American to his environment, the ambiguity of America's traitors.” Jaffe has exhibited at major museums worldwide, including Moderna Museet, Stockholm, Sweden; Irish Museum of Modern Art, Dublin, Ireland; and the Ikon Gallery, Birmingham, England.

=== Recent work ===
In the mid-80s, Jaffe produced records for reggae pioneer Joe Higgs, Grammy-nominated The Wailing Souls, and dancehall innovator Barrington Levy. In 2003, he wrote ONE LOVE: Life with Bob Marley and the Wailers, published by W.W. Norton and Sons.

In 2013, Jaffe co-wrote a book with French scholar and Jamaican popular music specialist, Jérémie Kroubo Dagnini, Bob Marley and the Wailers: 1973-1976, published by Camion Blanc (French language). This book is a sort of autobiography in which Jaffe reveals precious details about his meetings and relations with Bob Marley and other extraordinary artists including Peter Tosh, Hélio Oiticica, Vito Acconci, and Jean-Michel Basquiat just to name a few.

Jaffe lives today in New York, where he continues to produce films and create his large-scale painting and assemblage.

== Film ==
1969-72

- Mask Whisper
- Parallel Fears (with Miguel Rio Branco)
- Impact (with Vito Acconci)
- Nine Ways of Dying
- Brooklyn Bridge (with Gordon Matta-Clark)
- Le Chien (Starring Rita Renior and Elizabeth Weiner)
- The Life and Times of Luis Gonzaga

2009

- Flow: For Love of Water (producer)

== Discography ==
- 1977 Peter Tosh, Legalize it
- 1986 Joe Higgs, Family
- 1988 Joe Higgs, Blackman Know Yourself
- 1991 The Wailing Souls, All Over The World
- 1994 Morgan Heritage, Miracles
- 1994 Barrington Levy, Barrington
- 1999 Barrington Levy, Living Dangerously

== Books ==
- 2003 ONE LOVE, Life with Bob Marley and the Wailers by Lee Jaffe, Roger Steffens Publisher: W. W. Norton and Company; 1st edition (April 22, 2003)
- 1992 Cordially Yours, Lee Jaffe by Rainer Crone and David Moos. Publisher: Moderna Museet (1992)
- 2013 Bob Marley & The Wailers: 1973-1976 by Lee Jaffe, Jérémie Kroubo Dagnini. Publisher: Camion Blanc (June 17, 2013). Language: French.
