= Gotta Get Over =

Single by Eric Clapton

from the album Old Sock
- Released: February 14, 2013
- Genre: Rock · Pop rock
- Length: 3:02
- Label: Bushbranch · Surfdog
- Songwriter: Bramhall II · Costa · Stanley
- Producer: Simon Climie

Eric Clapton singles chronology
"All of Me" (2013)	"Gotta Get Over" (2013)	"Every Little Thing" (2013)

"Gotta Get Over" is a pop rock song written by Doyle Bramhall II, Nikka Costa and Justin Stanley. It was recorded by the British rock musician Eric Clapton for his 2013 studio album Old Sock. On February 14, 2013, the song was released as a digital download and CD single for Bushbranch and Surfdog Records. It features backing vocals by Chaka Khan.

== Composition ==
The song was written and recorded in the key of A major. Jason Shadrick of music magazine Premier Guitar notes a Derek and the Dominos style opening guitar riff and gospel-influenced chorus. Ultimate Classic Rock critic Billy Dukes called the title an "inspired jam [and] arrangement sounds like a classic blues [with] thick Fender and Hammond" sound. Dukes goes on in his analysis noting "Clapton finds a little gravel in his delivery as the guitarist takes the song over after 30 seconds". The critic also notes a "playfully soloing" by Clapton after the second verse finished. Finishing his review of the song, Dukes recalls the "stable rhythm section" and "funky guitar and organ lick providing a framework for him to frolic on top of". The track features backing vocals by Chaka Khan.

== Release ==
"Gotta Get Over" was releases as a promotional single record to help promote the 2013 studio album Old Sock in early 2013. The track was released on both digital format and CD promotional single on February 14, 2013. While the download was free, the CD single cost about 15 US dollar. Both the digital download and CD release are distributed by Bushbranch and Surfdog Records. "Gotta Get Over" was also released as part of the compilation album Forever Man on April 28, 2015.

== Track listing ==
Digital download and CD single
No.	Title	Writer(s)	Length
1.	"Gotta Get Over"	Doyle Bramhall II · Nikka Costa · Justin Stanley	3:02
Total length:			3:02

== Critical reception ==
Music journalist Derek Moore from the American 96.9 Eagle radio station based in Sacramento, California called the single release "catchy as hell" and adds, that the composition seems to be "funky, bouncy and fun, scooted along by a nice keyboard riff [and] decent fills by Mr. Slowhand himself". Critic Billy Dukes awards "Gotta Get Over" eight out of ten possible points, liking especially the "powerful sound" of the track. Journalist Jason Shadrick calls the song the "most Claptonian track" on the Old Sock album, noting "Clapton really shines" on the recording.

== Chart positions ==
=== Weekly charts ===
Chart (2013)	Peak position
Belgium (Ultratip Bubbling Under Flanders)	74
Belgium (Ultratip Bubbling Under Wallonia)	21
South Korea International (Circle)	75
