= Jérémie K. Dagnini =

French academic

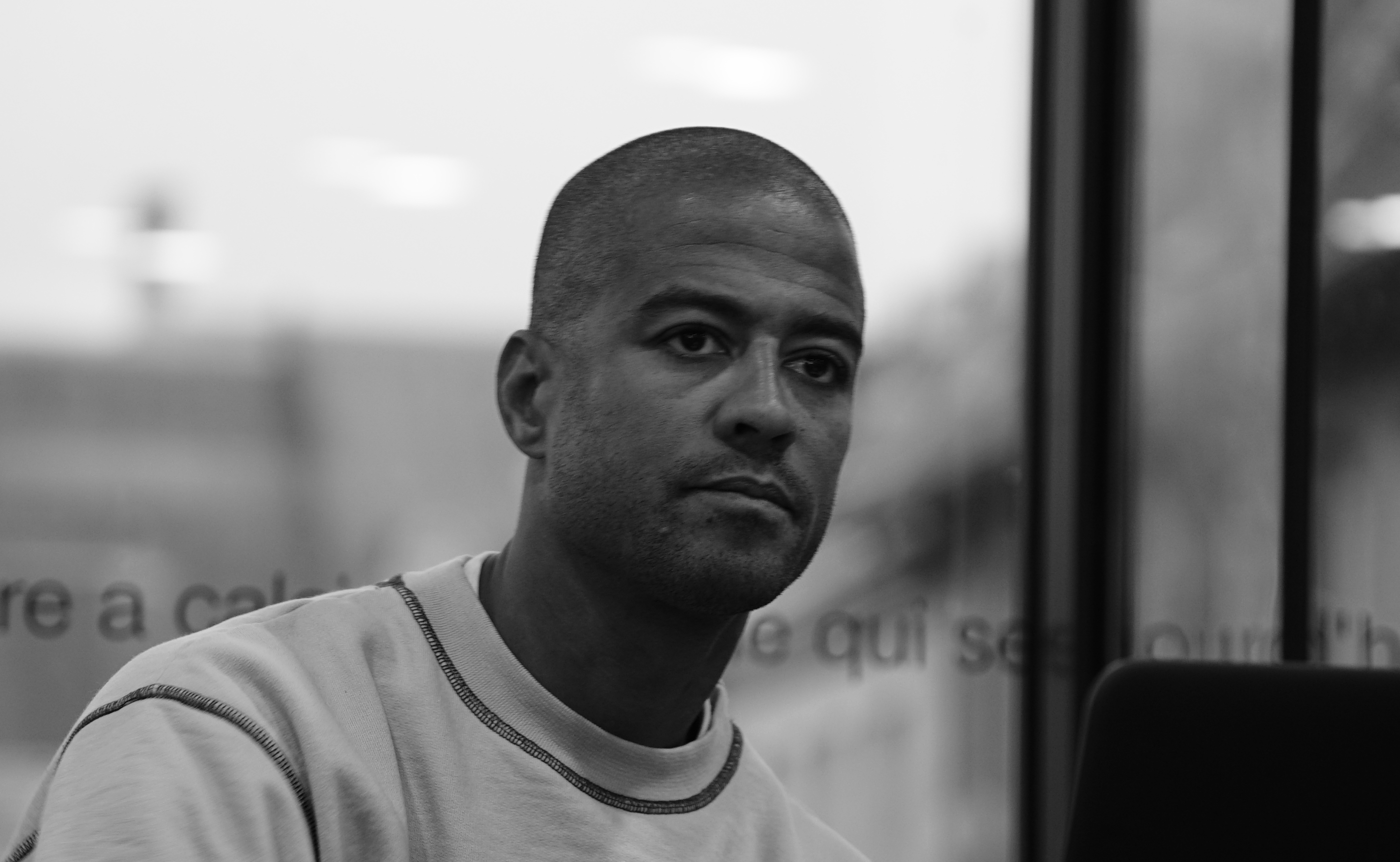
Jérémie K. Dagnini in 2018

Jérémie K. Dagnini is a French academic, specializing in Jamaican popular music.

== Biography ==
Jérémie Kroubo Dagnini (JKD) is a French scholar, holding a PhD in Anglophone studies from the University Bordeaux Montaigne. He is a Jamaican popular music specialist and an associate researcher at the Center for Contemporary Political Studies at the University of Orléans (CEPOC). He is the author of numerous books and articles and has also translated the biography of Lee Scratch Perry written by journalist David Katz. In 2013, he co-wrote a book with American artist Lee Jaffe, Bob Marley & The Wailers: 1973-1976, revealing, among other things, precious details about the daily life of the band in Hope Road and Trench Town at that time, the links Bob Marley had with the local Mafia, and the 1976 smuggling operation that raised money to fund Peter Tosh groundbreaking album Legalize It. JKD also co-wrote a documentary on reggae, "Le Souffle du reggae", directed by Jérémie Cuvillier and broadcast in 2016 on France Ô. In March 2017 he was awarded by the Académie Charles Cros for his book Musiques noires. L'Histoire d'une résistance sonore (Éditions du Camion blanc). In the same year 2017, he wrote an article published in the catalogue of the exhibition Jamaica Jamaica! held at the Philharmonie de Paris. JKD regularly gives national and international conferences on reggae and Jamaican music. In November 2018, Unesco has declared reggae as an 'intangible heritage site', J. Kroubo Dagnini delivered his insights on the topic. More recently, he gave his views on the popular Jamaican expression Bumbo Klaat in the French broadsheet Le Monde. In November 2023, JKD gave lectures on the Small Axe British anthology film series, created and directed by Steve McQueen, at the Entrevues Belfort Film Festival (38th edition). From May 13, 2025, to October 1, 2025, JKD is participating in the CLUBBING exhibition held at the Grand Palais Immersif, an immersive and participatory exhibition designed by the artist Pierre Giner. During this exhibition, JKD tells the story of the sound system culture in Kingston, the Roxy club in London and the Parker Place (reggae nightclub) in Abidjan. Jérémie Kroubo Dagnini is of Ivorian descent through his father side. In other respects, he is a 3rd Dan karate black belt.

== Books ==
- Les Origines du reggae : Retour aux sources. Mento, ska, rocksteady, early reggae, L'Harmattan, 2008 ISBN 978-2-296-06252-8. Reissued by Éditions du Camion Blanc in 2013 (preface by professor Barry Chevannes).
- Vibrations jamaïcaines. L'Histoire des musiques populaires jamaïcaines au XXe siècle, Camion blanc, 2011 ISBN 978-2-35779-157-2.
- Lee "Scratch" Perry: People Funny Boy (translation). Author: David Katz, Camion blanc, 2012 ISBN 978-2-35779-220-3.
- Bob Marley & The Wailers: 1973-1976. Co-author: Lee Jaffe. Camion Blanc, 2013 ISBN 978-2-35779-273-9.
- Rasta & Résistance (directeur d'ouvrage et préface). Author : Horace Campbell. Camion blanc, 2014 ISBN 978-2-35779-499-3.
- DJs & toasters jamaïcains : 1970-1979. Co-author: Eric Doumerc. Camion Blanc, 2015 ISBN 978-2-35779-677-5.
- Musiques noires. L'Histoire d'une résistance sonore (Editor). Camion blanc, 2016 ISBN 978-235779-872-4.
- La Peur: crise du siècle? (Editor). Camion noir, 2022

ISBN 978-237848-305-0.

== Documentaries ==
- Le Souffle du reggae (English title: Blowin' In The Reggae Wind), documentary directed by Jérémie Cuvillier and co-written with Jérémie Kroubo Dagnini. 52 mins (Theorem/ France Ô). Selected at the Francophone Film Festival in Kingston, Jamaica (14-24 November 2018). And film screening at the National Gallery of Jamaica on 28 April 2019 (The 25th Art of Reggae Exhibition).
