= Life of Contradiction =

Studio album by Joe Higgs
- Released: 1975, (re-released) 25 March 2008
- Genre: Reggae
- Label: Pressure Sounds

Life of Contradiction is the first album of reggae musician Joe Higgs. It was recorded in 1972 and released in 1975. The BBC describes the album as "a highly conceptual, deeply personal record by one of reggae’s true masters that deserves to cross over into popular music’s wider canon". The album was recorded with the Now Generation band. The album was re-released in 2008.

== Track listing ==
1. Come On Home
2. Got To Make A Way
3. Wake Up And Live
4. Life Of Contradiction
5. Who Brought Down The Curtains
6. There's A Reward
7. Hard Times Don't Bother Me
8. My Baby Still Love Me
9. She Was The One
10. Song My Enemy Sings
11. Let Us Do Something *
12. Freedom Journey *
- Bonus tracks on the Pressure Sounds reissue only.
