= Hotter than July =

1980 studio album by Stevie Wonder

Studio album by Stevie Wonder
- Released: September 29, 1980
- Recorded: 1979–1980
- Studios: Wonderland (Los Angeles, California)
- Genres: Soul; funk; R&B
- Length: 45:52
- Label: Tamla
- Producer: Stevie Wonder

Stevie Wonder chronology
Stevie Wonder's Journey Through "The Secret Life of Plants" (1979)	Hotter than July (1980)	Stevie Wonder's Original Musiquarium I (1982)

Singles from Hotter than July
- 1. "Master Blaster (Jammin')" Released: September 1980; 2. "I Ain't Gonna Stand for It" Released: October 1980; 3. "Lately" Released: January 1981; 4. "Happy Birthday" Released: April 1981; 5. "Did I Hear You Say You Love Me" Released: July 1981

Hotter than July is the nineteenth studio album by American singer, songwriter, and musician Stevie Wonder, released on September 29, 1980, by Tamla, a subsidiary of Motown Records. Wonder primarily recorded the album in Los Angeles, California, at Wonderland Studios, which he had recently acquired. The album peaked at number three on the Billboard Top LPs & Tape chart and was certified Platinum by the Recording Industry Association of America (RIAA) on February 3, 1981. It was Wonder's most successful album in the UK, where it peaked at number two on the UK Albums Chart and produced four top-10 singles. Music videos were produced for the album's first, third, and fourth singles.

The album was nominated for Favorite Soul/R&B Album at the 1982 American Music Awards.

== Background ==
The relative critical and commercial failure of Wonder's previous album Journey Through "The Secret Life of Plants" (1979), from which only one single ("Send One Your Love") reached the top 5 of a Billboard chart, left him struggling at the turn of the new decade, and he let the media know he felt Motown had not promoted that album very well. During this time of upheaval, Wonder co-wrote the song "Let's Get Serious" with Lee Garrett for Jermaine Jackson's 1980 album of the same name and the song "You Are My Heaven" with Eric Mercury, which became a success for Roberta Flack and Donny Hathaway on Atlantic Records. Wonder was also in demand as a guest on the recordings of artists such as B.B. King, James Taylor, Quincy Jones, and Smokey Robinson.

In addition to performing, Wonder handled the writing, arranging, and producing of Hotter than July, which was primarily recorded in Los Angeles at his newly acquired Wonderland Studios. "Master Blaster (Jammin')" (US No. 5; R&B No. 1), the album's lead-off single, was inspired by the reggae music of Bob Marley, who Wonder had met in 1979 after their performance at the Black Music Association in Philadelphia. The country-tinged "I Ain't Gonna Stand for It" (U.S. No. 11; R&B No. 4), the ballad "Lately" (U.S. No. 64) and the upbeat "Happy Birthday" were other notable successes from the album. In the UK, all four singles reached the top 10, with the first and fourth releases peaking at No. 2.

"All I Do" had originally been written by a teenaged Wonder and collaborators Clarence Paul and Morris Broadnax in 1966. Tammi Terrell recorded the first version of the song that year, but it remained in the Motown vaults until it was included in the compilation A Cellarful of Motown! in the UK in 2002, 32 years after Terrell's death. Brenda Holloway also recorded a version of the song, which was released in 2005 on her Motown Anthology set. Michael Jackson, Eddie Levert and Walter Williams of The O'Jays, and Betty Wright provided backing vocals for Wonder's recording of the song for Hotter than July. The backing vocals for "I Ain't Gonna Stand for It" were handled by Charlie and Ronnie Wilson of The Gap Band, and Wonder's ex-wife Syreeta backed Wonder on "As If You Read My Mind".

While a number of Wonder's previous works, such as Songs in the Key of Life and Innervisions, had received wide critical acclaim and had chart success, Hotter than July was his first album eligible to be certified Platinum by the RIAA, as Motown sales records before 1977 were not audited by the organization after they introduced the category.

== Sleeve liner design and Martin Luther King Jr. Day activism ==
Wonder wrote "Happy Birthday" to honor Martin Luther King Jr. and used the song to campaign for King's birthday, January 15, to become a national holiday in the United States (Martin Luther King Jr. Day would be declared a federal holiday in 1983, and first be celebrated nationwide in 1986). The design of Hotter than July's original record sleeve is also dedicated to these two purposes. Both sides of the sleeve are printed in a black-and-white semi-glossy photographic process. One side features a large square photographic portrait of King inset on a black background with white lettering above and below. Above the photo is printed "Martin Luther King, Jr." "January 15, 1929 – April 4, 1968" (on two lines, centered), and below it appears a passage of text written by Wonder, which reads:

It is believed that for a man to lay down his life for the love of others is the supreme sacrifice. Jesus Christ by his own example showed us that there is no greater love. For nearly two thousand years now we have been striving to have the strength to follow that example. Martin Luther King was a man who had that strength. He showed us, non-violently, a better way of life, a way of mutual respect, helping us to avoid much bitter confrontation and inevitable bloodshed. We still have a long road to travel until we reach the world that was his dream. We in the United States must not forget either his supreme sacrifice or that dream.

I and a growing number of people believe that it is time for our country to adopt legislation that will make January 15, Martin Luther King's birthday, a national holiday, both in recognition of what he achieved and as a reminder of the distance which still has to be traveled.

Join me in the observance of January 15, 1981 as a national holiday.
Stevland Morris a/k/a Stevie Wonder

To the right of this text is a thumbprint, presumably Wonder's, serving as his signature.

On the other side of the record sleeve is a collage of five historical photos: one filling the top third, three sharing the middle third, and one filling the bottom third. The top image is an aerial view of a low-lying urban area with a six-lane highway passing through it and thick smoke rising from many of the buildings on both sides of the highway—presumably a riot is taking place. The center three images consist of a central rectangular photo of a large peaceful demonstration march, with both black and white participants, being led by Martin Luther King Jr. and two square flanking photos of apparent police brutality: in the photo to the left, three officers in white helmets, one of whom is holding a club, are grabbing a male African-American youth by his arms and one leg, and, in the photo to the right, an officer in a white helmet stands in the foreground and looks toward an African-American man lying in a pool of blood on the sidewalk in front of an urban store, while another African-American man crouches with his back against the wall and looks away (King directly mentioned police brutality in his famous "I Have a Dream" speech). The bottom image shows a confrontation in an urban street four or five lanes wide between a large group of African Americans standing in non-violent defiance and law enforcement officers in white helmets who appear to be advancing with weapons. These images contrast with the upbeat and positive mood of the music on most of the album—"Happy Birthday" included. Exceptions are the few songs about romantic turmoil ("Rocket Love", "I Ain't Gonna Stand for It", "Lately") and the socially critical "Cash in Your Face", which protests racial housing discrimination.

== Critical reception ==
Professional ratings
Review scores
Source	Rating
AllMusic	4.5/5 stars
Christgau's Record Guide	A−
Pitchfork	9.4/10
Rolling Stone	4/5 stars
(The New) Rolling Stone Album Guide	4/5 stars
Sounds	4/5 stars

In a contemporary review for Rolling Stone, Stephen Holden said Hotter than July proved Wonder was still "our most gifted pop muralist" because of his evocative, unique synthesis of pop and African elements. The album was voted the eighth best of 1980 in The Village Voice's annual Pazz & Jop critics poll. Robert Christgau, that poll's creator, ranked the album eighteenth on his own year-end list and wrote in a retrospective review that, while "Master Blaster" and perhaps "Happy Birthday" were the only "great Stevie here", the pleasure with which Wonder performed the songs was evident in "his free-floating melodicism and his rolling overdrive, his hope and his cynicism". In a review in (The New) Rolling Stone Album Guide, J. D. Considine called the album "buoyantly tuneful" and said fans viewed it as a return to form for Wonder after the commercial disappointment of Journey Through the Secret Life of Plants.

Rob Theakston of Allmusic claimed "Solid songwriting, musicianship, and production are evident in the majority of Hotter Than July...While most definitely not on the same tier as Innervisions or Songs in the Key of Life, Hotter Than July is the portrait of an artist who still had the Midas touch, but stood at the crossroads of an illustrious career." Hanif Abdurraqib of Pitchfork also described Hotter than July as "an album of seemingly endless abundance. An album that asks not only 'How do you want to feel?' but also, 'How do you want to survive?' and then turns us towards the expansive forest of ever-shifting answers."

== Track listing ==
All songs written, produced and arranged by Stevie Wonder except where noted.

Side one
No.	Title	Lyrics	Length
1.	"Did I Hear You Say You Love Me"		4:07
2.	"All I Do"	Wonder, Clarence Paul, Morris Broadnax	5:06
3.	"Rocket Love"		4:39
4.	"I Ain't Gonna Stand for It"		4:39
5.	"As If You Read My Mind"		3:37

Side two
No.	Title	Length
6.	"Master Blaster (Jammin')"	5:07
7.	"Do Like You"	4:25
8.	"Cash in Your Face"	3:59
9.	"Lately"	4:05
10.	"Happy Birthday"	5:57

== Personnel ==
- Stevie Wonder – lead vocals, synthesizer (1–3, 7, 8), drums (2–4, 7, 8, 10), Fender Rhodes (2, 3, 6, 8), bass synthesizer (3, 8, 9), clavinet (4–6), background vocals (3), ARP (7, 10), vocoder (1), piano (4, 5, 9), harpsichord (7), celesta (5), keyboards (10), harmonica (5), cabasa (4), bells (2), handclaps (8), flute synthesizer (2), bass melodian (10)
- Nathan Watts – bass guitar (1, 4–6), background vocals (1)
- Benjamin Bridges – guitars (1, 3–6), background vocals (1)
- Dennis Davis – drums (1, 5, 6)
- Earl DeRouen – percussion (1, 5, 6, 8), background vocals (1)
- Isaiah Sanders – pianet (1), keyboards, piano, Fender Rhodes (4, 5), organ (6), background vocals (1)
- Hank Redd – saxophone (1, 2, 6), handclaps (8)
- Robert Malach – saxophone (1, 7)
- Larry Gittens – trumpet (1, 6, 7)
- Nolan A. Smith Jr. – trumpet (1)
- Paul Riser – string arrangement (3)
- Hank DeVito – steel guitar (4)
- Rick Zunigar – guitars (5, 6)
- Delores Barnes (7), Shirley Brewer (1, 6, 7), Ed Brown (1), Susaye Greene Brown (1), Charlie Collins (1), Alexandra Brown Evans (1, 6, 7), Mary Lee Whitney Evans (1), Marva Holcolm (6), Michael Jackson (2), Eddie Levert (2), Melody McCulley (7), Jamil Raheem (2), Walter Williams (2), Charlie Wilson (4), Ronnie Wilson (4), Angela Winbush (1, 6), Betty Wright (2), Syreeta Wright (5) – background vocals
- Stephanie Andrews, Kimberly Jackson, Trevor Lawrence, Dennis Morrison, Bill Wolfer – handclaps (8)

== Singles ==
Year	Name	US	US R&B	UK	US Club Play
1980	"Master Blaster (Jammin')"	5	1	2	10
1981	"I Ain't Gonna Stand for It"	11	4	10	–
1981	"Lately"	64	29	3	–
1981	"Happy Birthday"	–	70	2	–
1981	"Did I Hear You Say You Love Me"	–	74	–	–

== Charts ==
=== Weekly charts ===
Chart (1980–1981)	Position
Australian Kent Music Report	3
Austrian Albums Chart	2
Canadian RPM Albums Chart	18
Dutch Albums Chart	4
Japanese Oricon Albums Chart	29
New Zealand Albums Chart	2
Norwegian VG-lista Albums Chart	5
Swedish Albums Chart	3
UK Albums Chart	2
U.S. Billboard 200	3
West German Media Control Albums Chart	12

=== Year-end charts ===
Chart (1980)	Position
Australian Kent Music Report	54
French Albums Chart	39
UK Albums Chart	43
Chart (1981)	Position
Australian Kent Music Report	8
German Albums (Offizielle Top 100)	55
New Zealand Albums (RMNZ)	10
UK Albums Chart	14
U.S. Billboard Year-End	21

=== Decade-end charts ===
Chart (1980–89)	Position
Austrian Albums Chart	28

== Certifications and sales ==
Region	Certification	Certified units/sales
Australia (ARIA)	3× Platinum	210,000^{^}
Canada (Music Canada)	2× Platinum	200,000^{^}
France (SNEP)	Gold	100,000^{*}
Japan (Oricon Charts)	—	73,000
Netherlands (NVPI)	Gold	50,000^{^}
New Zealand (RMNZ)	Platinum	15,000^{^}
United Kingdom (BPI)	Platinum	500,000
United States (RIAA)	Platinum	1,000,000^{^}
Summaries
Worldwide	—	3,000,000
^{*} Sales figures based on certification alone.^{^} Shipments figures based on certification alone.

== See also ==
- List of Billboard number-one R&B albums of 1980
- List of Billboard number-one R&B albums of 1981
