= Happy Birthday (Stevie Wonder song) =

1981 single by Stevie Wonder

- UK single picture sleeve

Single by Stevie Wonder

from the album Hotter than July
- B-side: "Happy Birthday" (sing-along version)
- Released: June 26, 1981
- Recorded: 1980
- Genre: Pop; R&B
- Length: 5:53
- Label: Motown
- Songwriter: Stevie Wonder
- Producer: Stevie Wonder

Stevie Wonder singles chronology
"Lately" (1981)	"Happy Birthday" (1981)	"Did I Hear You Say You Love Me" (1981)

"Happy Birthday" is a song written, produced and performed by Stevie Wonder for the Motown label. Wonder, a social activist, was one of the main figures in the campaign to have the birthday of Martin Luther King Jr. become a national holiday, and created this single to promulgate the cause. The song has since become a standard for use during birthdays in general, particularly among African Americans.

"Happy Birthday" was released as the fourth single of Wonder's Hotter than July (1980) album in June 1981. It was one of his most popular entries in the UK Singles Chart. It was not released in the United States, but is still regarded as one of his signature songs. In June 2026, CBS News included the song in its list of the 250 essential American songs of the past 250 years, one of three Wonder songs to make the list.

== Background ==
The song, one of many of Wonder's songs to feature the use of a keyboard synthesizer, features Wonder lamenting the fact that anyone would oppose the idea of a Dr. King holiday, where "peace is celebrated throughout the world" and singing to King in the chorus, "Happy birthday to you". The holiday, he proposes, would facilitate the realization of Dr. King's dreams of integration and "love and unity for all of God's children".

Wonder used the song to popularize the campaign, and continued his fight for the holiday, holding the Rally for Peace Press Conference in 1981. United States President Ronald Reagan approved the creation of the holiday, signing it into existence on November 2, 1983. The first official Martin Luther King Jr. Day, held the third Monday in January of each year, was held on January 20, 1986, and was commemorated with a large-scale concert, where Wonder was the headlining performer.

"Happy Birthday" was released as a single in several countries. In the UK, the song became one of Wonder's biggest hits, reaching number two in the charts in 1981.

When Wonder performed the song at Nelson Mandela Day at Radio City Music Hall on July 19, 2009, he slightly changed the lyrics, "Thanks to Mandela and Martin Luther King!" in the second verse. Wonder also performed this song at the Diamond Jubilee Concert in London for the Diamond Jubilee of Elizabeth II.

== Personnel ==
- Stevie Wonder – piano, Fender Rhodes, vocoder, drums, Bass Melodian Synthesizer, Fairlight Synthesizer
- Background Vocals: Linda Allen, Windy Barnes, Brenda M. Boyce, Shirley Brewer, Emma Coleman, Susaye Greene Brown, Renee Hardaway, Malikia Hilton, Josie James, Melody McCully, Nadra Ross, LaDee Streeter, Tammy Thomes, Venetta Wiley, Betty Wright

== Charts ==
Chart (1981)	Peak position
Australia (Kent Music Report)	31
Belgium (Ultratop 50 Flanders)	13
Ireland (IRMA)	5
Israel (IBA)	1
Netherlands (Dutch Top 40)	10
Netherlands (Single Top 100)	12
New Zealand (Recorded Music NZ)	23
Switzerland (Schweizer Hitparade)	8
UK Singles (Official Charts)	2
West Germany (GfK)	18
Zimbabwe (ZIMA)	20

Chart (1999)	Peak position
US Hot R&B/Hip-Hop Songs (Billboard)	70

2026 chart performance
Chart (2026)	Peak position
Jamaica Airplay (JAMMS)	7

== Certifications ==
Region	Certification	Certified units/sales
Germany (BVMI)	Gold	250,000^{‡}
New Zealand (RMNZ)	Gold	15,000^{‡}
United Kingdom (BPI)	Platinum	600,000^{‡}
^{‡} Sales+streaming figures based on certification alone.
