= Angel (J. J. Cale song) =

Single by Eric Clapton

from the album Old Sock
- Released: March 4, 2013
- Genre: Pop rock
- Length: 3:54
- Label: Polydor
- Songwriter: J.J. Cale

Audio
- "Angel" by Eric Clapton on YouTube

"Angel" is a pop rock song written by the American recording artist J.J. Cale. The British rock musician Eric Clapton covered the song and released his take on the track in 2013 on his studio album Old Sock for Polydor Records. The title was also released as a digital download single on March 4, 2013.

== Background and release ==
Cale wrote the song in 1981 and kept the publishing rights for the title for Really Crazy Mamas Music, administered by Broadcast Music Incorporated. For his track-by-track commentary on the Old Sock release in 2013, Clapton explained: "When we did this other album that was just called Clapton, we had tracks in the can, which was another thing to do with why this came to be, this album because I had about three songs, maybe more, actually, that I thought were up to scratch to release and so... Part of that thing in killing time was to complement these tracks, and "Angel" was one of them, that we'd done a couple of years previously. We'd never really resolved it, so we kinda re-did it again. But we had J.J.'s voice on there and everything. And so it was another hommage to him, with him on it. And I liked the song a lot".

The song was never released by Cale in 1981 and was not released on the 2010 Clapton studio album. Editor's from the official Clapton fan club Where's Eric! do believe, that the first recording was made in late 2005 or early 2006, when Clapton and Cale began to work on their collaborative effort The Road to Escondido. Clapton, however, did explain in the Old Sock interview, that he recorded the song with Cale in 2009 or 2010. The promotional single "Angel" was released as a digital download on March 4, 2013. In addition to promote the Old Sock studio effort, the song was made available for airplay around the world. The recording was produced by Eric Clapton himself along with his long-time collaborator record producer Simon Climie. Also, Doyle Bramhall II as well as Justin Stanley produced the title, which is the second song on Old Sock.

== Reception ==
The track was chosen by the coffee company Starbucks as "Pick of the Week" starting on March 5, 2013. "Angel" was made available for Starbucks customers via the entertainment section of the Starbucks Digital Network while in the store or through the Starbucks app. Music critic Philip Majorins from PopMatters thinks, that "Angel" stands out for the "erratic evolution of styles represented" on Old Sock, noting the song seems to keep up the "consistent and reassuring sunny mood" of the album. Majorins calls the title a "joy of the collaborative interplay", which make the studio album a "satisfying but languid party". In Romania, the single was downloaded over two and a half thousand times while on chart for nine weeks and was presented with a silver disc, peaking at position 11 on the country's digital download single chart, which is compiled by the International Federation of the Phonographic Industry.

== Charts ==
Chart (2013)	Peak position
Romania (IFPI)	11

== Certifications ==
Region	Certification
Romania (IFPI Romania)	Silver
