= I Ain't Gonna Stand for It =

1980 single by Stevie Wonder

Single by Stevie Wonder

from the album Hotter than July
- B-side: "Knocks Me Off My Feet"
- Released: November 1980
- Genre: R&B; soul; country
- Length: 4:39
- Label: Motown
- Songwriter: Stevie Wonder
- Producer: Stevie Wonder

Stevie Wonder singles chronology
"Master Blaster (Jammin')" (1980)	"I Ain't Gonna Stand for It" (1980)	"Lately" (1981)

"I Ain't Gonna Stand for It" is the second single from Stevie Wonder's 1980 album, Hotter Than July. It reached number four on the Billboard R&B singles chart and number 11 on the Hot 100. It also hit number 10 on the UK Singles Chart. The song is famous for Wonder's imitation of a seasoned country-and-western crooner. Charlie and Ronnie Wilson of The Gap Band provide backing vocals on the song. It was covered by Eric Clapton in 2001.

Record World called it a "beautifully constructed song" and praised the "warm, universal lyrics" as well as the "irresistible chorus hook."

== Personnel ==
- Stevie Wonder – lead vocals, piano, clavinet, cabasa, drums, background vocals
- Nathan Watts – bass
- Ben Bridges – acoustic guitar, electric guitar
- Isaiah Sanders – Fender Rhodes
- Hank Devito – steel guitar
- Charlie Wilson – background vocals
- Ronnie Wilson – background vocals

== Chart history ==
=== Weekly charts ===
Chart (1980–1981)	Peak position
Australia (Kent Music Report)	61
Canada Top Singles (RPM)	9
Germany (GfK)	50
Ireland (IRMA)	6
Netherlands (Dutch Top 40)	31
Netherlands (Single Top 100)	29
New Zealand (Recorded Music NZ)	2
UK Singles (Official Charts)	10
US Billboard Hot 100	11
US Hot R&B/Hip-Hop Songs (Billboard)	4
US Adult Contemporary (Billboard)	20
US Cash Box Top 100	13

=== Year-end charts ===
Chart (1981)	Rank
Canada (RPM)	72
US Cash Box	86
US Top Pop Singles (Billboard)	73

== Eric Clapton version ==
"I Ain't Gonna Stand for It"

Single by Eric Clapton

from the album Reptile
- Released: March 22, 2001
- Length: 4:50
- Label: Reprise
- Songwriter: Stevie Wonder
- Producers: Eric Clapton; Simon Climie

Eric Clapton singles chronology
"Help the Poor" (2000)	"I Ain't Gonna Stand for It" (2001)	"Every Little Thing" (2013)

On March 22, 2001, British rock musician Eric Clapton released his version of the song along with the two B-sides "Losing Hand" and "Johnny Guitar" as a CD single and maxi-single release under Reprise Records. The recording was produced by Clapton himself along with his long-time collaborator Simon Climie. It was also released as part of his 2001 studio album Reptile, just a month before Clapton's interpretation of the song was released as a single. Besides being released as a single and on the Reptile studio album, the song was released to several compilation albums and B-side single releases. AllMusic critic William Ruhlmann noted that by "remaking [the] song by Wonder means competing with [him] vocally, and as a singer Clapton isn't up to the challenge. He is assisted by the current five-man version of the Impressions, who do much to shore up his vocal weaknesses, but he still isn't a disciplined or thoughtful singer. Of course, when that distinctive electric guitar sound kicks in, all is forgiven".

Although the song was well received in digital media, it did not make a major impact on the international music charts, reaching number 63 in Switzerland.

=== Music video ===
A music video to accompany the single release was shot on February 14, 2001, during the Reptile World Tour rehearsal. The official music video starts with a rehearsal photo session and later features Clapton and his band – namely Andy Fairweather Low, Steve Gadd, Nathan East, Paulinho da Costa, David Sancious and the Impressions – performing the song, while early biographical pictures of Clapton can be seen. During other passages of the video, early childhood memories of the band members are shown. While performing the song in the rehearsal situation, sounds of Clapton and his band talking, laughing and playing table football can be seen and heard. The video to "I Ain't Gonna Stand for It" fades out to another rehearsal section, as the music does also, to the end. It was published under license of the Warner Music Group originally in 2001 for TV broadcasting and was made available legally via various internet platforms in 2007.

=== Charts ===
Chart (2001)	Peak position
Hungary Airplay (Music & Media)	15
Poland Airplay (Music & Media)	1
Romania (Romanian Top 100)	87
Spain Airplay (Music & Media)	4
Switzerland (Schweizer Hitparade)	63
UK Singles (Official Charts)	99
