= Rod Dyer =

Rod Dyer (born in South Africa) is an American graphic artist, illustrator, photographer and restaurateur.

== Career ==
Dyer has been described as a "prominent graphic designer who created many of the album covers for Capitol Records in the 1960s." Logos and symbols to his credit include Disney Channel, Entertainment Tonight, Paramount Pictures, Big Ticket Television, 20th Century Fox, Cinergi Pictures, Heaven, MCA, Gramercy Pictures, Surround Sound, and graphics for Guess Jeans.

In 1965, Dyer was nominated for a Grammy award for the cover art of the album Stan Kenton Conducts The Los Angeles Neophonic Orchestra.

== Death of daughter ==
In 1988, his 18-year-old daughter Teak Dyer was kidnapped, robbed, raped, and murdered.
