= Kaya (album) =

Studio album by Bob Marley and the Wailers
- Released: 23 March 1978
- Recorded: January – April 1977
- Studios: Island, London, England
- Genre: Reggae
- Length: 36:59
- Labels: Tuff Gong; Island
- Producers: Bob Marley and the Wailers

Bob Marley and the Wailers chronology
Exodus (1977)	Kaya (1978)	Babylon by Bus (1978)

Singles from Kaya
- 1. "Is This Love" Released: 3 February 1978; 2. "Satisfy My Soul" Released: 26 May 1978

Kaya is the tenth studio album by the Jamaican reggae band Bob Marley and the Wailers, released in 1978. The album consists of tracks recorded alongside those released on the Exodus album. It was produced by the Wailers.

The album's release coincided with the One Love Peace Concert, heralding Marley's triumphant return to Jamaica from exile in London. Three of the songs are new versions of tracks from the 1971 album Soul Revolution Part II. Kaya reached the top five in the UK album charts. A 40th anniversary remix was released on 2 June 2018.

== Critical reception ==
Professional ratings
Review scores
Source	Rating
AllMusic	4/5 stars
Christgau's Record Guide	A−
The Encyclopedia of Popular Music	4/5 stars
MusicHound Rock: The Essential Album Guide	2.5/5 stars

Lester Bangs, in Rolling Stone, wrote: "Musically, Kaya is a succession of the most tepid reggae clichés, pristinely performed and recorded, every last bit of tourist bait (down to the wood blocks) in place just like a Martin Denny record." The Bay State Banner noted that "the Wailers take freely from Gamble & Huff's chords, Euro-disco's burping bass, and pop-soul ballads' blithe strings and synthesizers, but they funk up and condense these styles and use reggae's chicken scratch and snap-on drumming as disco employs congas: for a counter-voice to handle the unspeakable passions in a song." Robert Christgau said, "If this is MOR, it's MOR like good Steely Dan—MOR with a difference." Christgau added, "Marley has sung with more apparent passion, it's true, but never more subtly, and his control of the shift in conception that began with Exodus is now absolute. He hasn't abandoned his apocalyptic vision—just found a day-to-day context for it." The Globe and Mail opined that "Marley's reggae, expansive as always, has this time failed to integrate the Jamaican and American elements."

== Track listing ==
=== Original album (1978) ===
All songs written by Bob Marley. Mastered by Ted Jensen of Sterling Sound.

Side one
No.	Title	Length
1.	"Easy Skanking"	2:58
2.	"Kaya"	3:15
3.	"Is This Love"	3:52
4.	"Sun Is Shining"	4:58
5.	"Satisfy My Soul"	4:31

Side two
No.	Title	Length
1.	"She's Gone"	2:25
2.	"Misty Morning"	3:33
3.	"Crisis"	3:54
4.	"Running Away"	4:15
5.	"Time Will Tell"	3:29

=== The Definitive Remasters edition (2001) ===
All songs written by Bob Marley.

CD version
No.	Title	Length
1.	"Easy Skanking"	2:58
2.	"Kaya"	3:15
3.	"Is This Love"	3:52
4.	"Sun Is Shining"	4:58
5.	"Satisfy My Soul"	4:31
6.	"She's Gone"	2:25
7.	"Misty Morning"	3:33
8.	"Crisis"	3:54
9.	"Running Away"	4:15
10.	"Time Will Tell"	3:29
11.	"Smile Jamaica" (alternate version)	5:03
Total length:		43:26

=== Deluxe edition (2013) ===
Disc one: Kaya Remastered
No.	Title	Length
1.	"Easy Skanking"	2:58
2.	"Kaya"	3:15
3.	"Is This Love"	3:52
4.	"Sun Is Shining"	4:58
5.	"Satisfy My Soul"	4:31
6.	"She's Gone"	2:25
7.	"Misty Morning"	3:33
8.	"Crisis"	3:54
9.	"Running Away"	4:15
10.	"Time Will Tell"	3:29
11.	"Smile Jamaica" (version)	5:02

Disc two: Live at Ahoy Hallen, Rotterdam, Netherlands 7 July 1978
No.	Title	Length
1.	"Positive Vibration"	5:29
2.	"The Heathen"	4:05
3.	"Them Belly Full (But We Hungry)"	3:46
4.	"Concrete Jungle"	5:48
5.	"Rebel Music (3 O'Clock Road Block)"	5:13
6.	"War / No More Trouble"	6:22
7.	"I Shot the Sheriff"	4:28
8.	"No Woman, No Cry"	6:42
9.	"Is This Love"	5:55
10.	"Jamming"	7:54
11.	"Easy Skanking"	4:50
12.	"Get Up, Stand Up"	4:55
13.	"Exodus"	10:43

=== Kaya: 40th Anniversary Mix (2018) ===
Disc one: Kaya Remastered
No.	Title	Length
1.	"Easy Skanking"	2:58
2.	"Kaya"	3:15
3.	"Is This Love"	3:52
4.	"Sun Is Shining"	4:58
5.	"Satisfy My Soul"	4:31
6.	"She's Gone"	2:25
7.	"Misty Morning"	3:33
8.	"Crisis"	3:54
9.	"Running Away"	4:15
10.	"Time Will Tell"	3:29
11.	"Smile Jamaica" (version)	5:02

Disc two: Kaya 40 (Stephen Marley Remix)
No.	Title	Length
1.	"Easy Skanking"	3:53
2.	"Kaya"	3:15
3.	"Is This Love"	3:52
4.	"Sun Is Shining"	4:58
5.	"Satisfy My Soul"	4:31
6.	"She's Gone"	2:25
7.	"Misty Morning"	3:33
8.	"Crisis"	3:54
9.	"Running Away"	4:15
10.	"Time Will Tell"	3:29
11.	"Smile Jamaica" (version)	5:02

== Musicians ==
- Bob Marley – lead vocals, acoustic and rhythm guitar, percussion
- Junior Marvin – lead guitar
- Tyrone "Organ D" Downie – keyboards, percussion
- Aston "Family Man" Barrett – bass, percussion
- Carlton Barrett – drums, percussion
- Winston Grennan – drums
- Alvin "Seeco" Patterson – percussion
- Vincent Gordon – trombone
- Glen Da Costa – trumpet
- Rita Marley – backing vocals
- Marcia Griffiths – backing vocals
- Judy Mowatt – backing vocals

== Charts ==
=== Weekly charts ===
Weekly chart performance for Kaya
Chart (1978–79)	Peak position
Australian Albums (Kent Music Report)	5
Norwegian Albums Chart	6
New Zealand Albums Chart	6
Swedish Albums Chart	14
UK Albums Chart	4
US Billboard 200	50
US Top R&B/Hip-Hop Albums (Billboard)	50

=== Year-end charts ===
Year-end chart performance for Kaya
Chart (1978)	Position
Australian Albums (Kent Music Report)	12
New Zealand Albums (RMNZ)	21

== Certifications ==
Certifications for Kaya
Region	Certification	Certified units/sales
Australia (ARIA)	Platinum	50,000^{^}
France (SNEP)	2× Platinum	600,000^{*}
Germany (BVMI)	Gold	250,000^{^}
United Kingdom (BPI)	Gold	100,000^{^}
United States (RIAA)	Gold	500,000^{^}
^{*} Sales figures based on certification alone.^{^} Shipments figures based on certification alone.
