= Small Axe (song) =

Song by Bob Marley

Upsetter Records single release in 1971

"Small Axe" is a song now credited to Bob Marley though the first releases credited Lee "Scratch" Perry and Bob Marley. Perry said it was a collaboration. It was initially released in 1970 as a single by Perry on his Upsetter Records label, then later rerecorded for 1973's the Wailers album Burnin'. It has since been covered by several artists, among others Buju Banton, Deerhoof, Andrew Tosh, Greensky Bluegrass, the Aggrovators, U Roy, UB40, Trey Anastasio, and Peps Persson who made a Swedish version called "Liden såg" (little saw).

== Background ==
In the period when the song was written, virtually all the power in the Jamaican music industry was in a few hands, including Coxsone Dodd (Studio One), Duke Reid (Treasure Isle), and Prince Buster (Federal Records with Ken Khouri). Perry, frustrated at the situation, thought a metaphorical small axe could remove their power, as in the song's lyrics: "If you are a big tree, we are the small axe, sharpened to cut you down".

"Small Axe" was first recorded and produced in 1970 as a non-album single by Perry, and Martin Rodman. The version heard on the Island Records album Burnin' was re-recorded a few years later, with Chris Blackwell and the Wailers as producers.

There is a confusion over credit for the composition of "Small Axe". The 1970 Jamaican issue credits the song to both Perry and Marley. The Trojan Records-issued African Herbsman album creditis the song to Perry. The Island-issued Burnin' album credits the song to Marley. This discrepancy occurred on a lot of the Perry material that was later re-recorded for Island Records. It was one of the major sources of the feud that raged between Lee Perry and Island for most of the latter part of the 20th century.

== Releases ==
"Small Axe" was released on Upsetter Records in Jamaica in 1970 and 1971. "Small Axe" was also released on a single by Perry's Upsetter Records UK. It featured "All In One" on the flip. The 1971 issue on Upsetter Jamaica had a different flip side; "Down the Road" by the Upsetters.

It was included on the album African Herbsman (1973), a compilation of tracks from the sessions that produced the album Soul Revolution Part II.

It was rerecorded and released in 1973 for the album Burnin'.

Small Axe was also the name of a CD issue 883717006523 in 2005 on the Pazzazz label. This features tracks from the Lee Perry sessions that spawned Soul Rebels and Soul Revolution Part II.

"Small Axe" was re-issued in 2013 on a US Upsetter 7-inch pressing with a different flip side, "Drum Version".
