= Soul Revolution Part II =

Soul Revolution

Studio album by Bob Marley and the Wailers
- Released: 1971
- Recorded: 1970–71
- Genre: Reggae
- Length: 34:24
- Labels: Maroon; Upsetter
- Producer: Lee Perry

Bob Marley and the Wailers chronology
| Soul Rebels (1970) | Soul Revolution (1971) | The Best of the Wailers (1971) |

Professional ratings
Review scores
| Source | Rating |
|---|---|
| AllMusic | 4/5 stars |

Soul Revolution (also known as Soul Revolution Part II) is the third album by Bob Marley and the Wailers. It was produced by Lee "Scratch" Perry. While the name on the album cover for all the original releases was Soul Revolution Part II, the name Soul Revolution appeared on the record label. Because in traditional record collecting, the name that appears on the record label itself is honored as the correct name of the album, the proper name of this album should be considered to be Soul Revolution. A dub version with the vocals removed was released as Soul Revolution Part II Dub; both versions were released as one set in 1988. The album was repackaged with additional material as African Herbsman in 1973.

== Track listing ==
All tracks written by Bob Marley, except where noted.

Side one

1. "Keep On Moving" (Lee "Scratch" Perry, Rainford Hugh, Curtis Mayfield) 3:09
2. "Don't Rock My Boat" 4:33 (a version of this song appeared on Kaya (1978) as "Satisfy My Soul")
3. "Put It On" 3:34
4. "Fussing and Fighting" 2:29
5. "Duppy Conqueror V/4" 3:25
6. "Memphis" 2:09

"Duppy Conqueror V/4[version 4]" is a version of the song "Duppy Conqueror" in which parts of the vocals have been left off, such that it in effect alternates between the vocal version of the song and an instrumental version of the song.

Side two

1. "Riding High" (Neville Livingston) 2:46
2. "Kaya" 2:39 (also appeared on the 1978 album of the same name)
3. "African Herbman" (Richie Havens) 2:24
4. "Stand Alone" 2:12
5. "Sun Is Shining" 2:11
6. "Brain Washing" 2:41

"Riding High" and "Brain Washing" – lead vocals by Bunny Wailer. The correct title of the song is "African Herbsman" but it was misspelled as "African Herbman" on the original LP label.

CD releases (bonus tracks)

1. "Kaya" (alternative version) 2:37 — some editions only
2. "Duppy Conqueror" (alternative version) 3:48 — some editions only

== Soul Revolution Part II Dub ==
Cover of the dub version

Soul Revolution Part II Dub is a dub companion set to Soul Revolution Part II, being the original Soul Revolution Part II album with the vocals stripped off. In the case of "Memphis", which originally contained no vocals, Peter Tosh's lead melodica solo was removed to create the new instrumental version. This album was originally released only in Jamaica. The instrumental version of the album was originally released in a very limited pressing on Upsetter Records, "part of which was jacketed in plain sleeves and part of which was jacketed in Soul Revolution Part II sleeves." Dating to as late as 2004, this album has also become known as "Upsetter Revolution Rhythm," because of a CD by that name released in 2004 (Hip-O Records / Universal Music / JAD cat#B0003300-02) which was a reissue of the original instrumental album, with the addition of one bonus track: "Kaya version alternate mix".

== Part 1 & 2 ==
In 1988, Trojan Records released a double-LP reissue of both albums, catalogue number TRLD 406, called "Soul Revolution I & II". This release included four extra tracks as compared with the original two LPs, which were "Soul Rebel" and "Mr. Brown" along with the instrumental dub versions, "Soul Rebel version 4" and "Dracula". Curiously, and partially in line with "Duppy Conqueror V/4" from the original vocal LP, "Soul Rebel version 4" contains only a small portion of choral vocals at the beginning of the song, with the rest being instrumental.

On the first disc of this release, "Duppy Conqueror V/4" is mistitled as "Duppy Conqueror". On the second disc, which is identified as "The Rhythm Album", song 5 is mistitled as "Duppy Conqueror Version 4" when in this context it should be titled just "Duppy Conqueror". On disc 1, the misspelled title of "African Herbman" is preserved as on the original vocal LP, while on disc 2, the spelling of the title of the instrumental version has been corrected to "African Herbsman".

The cover of this Trojan Records release had a two-tone close-up photo-based image of Bob Marley in a square in the middle, surrounded on all four sides by repeated images of Bunny Wailer and Peter Tosh and another image of Bob Marley, as well as multi-coloured text reading "BOB MARLEY AND THE WAILERS SOUL REVOLUTION 1 AND 2". This cover of this Trojan reissue should not be confused with the cover of the original vocal Soul Revolution LP, which had a turquoise background, with dark blue text, and featured an hexagonal-shaped picture in the middle, surrounded by six square-shaped photos.

The Part 1 & 2 release contained tracks produced by the Wailers.

Bonus tracks

1. "Soul Rebel" (Lee "Scratch" Perry) 2:46
2. "Mr. Brown" (Gregory Isaacs, Bob Marley) 2:53
3. "Soul Rebel Version 4"
4. "Dracula" 2:55

== Personnel ==
The Wailers

- Bob Marley – vocals
- Peter Tosh – vocals, melodica
- Bunny Livingston – vocals

Additional musicians

- Alva Lewis – guitar
- Glen Adams – keyboard
- Aston Barrett – bass
- Carlton Barrett – drums

Production

- Lee Perry – producer
- Errol Thompson – engineer
