= No Sympathy =

Song by Bob Marley and the Wailers

from the album Soul Rebels
- Released: December 1970
- Genre: Reggae
- Length: 2:16
- Label: Upsetter
- Songwriter(s): Peter Tosh
- Producer(s): Lee Perry

"No Sympathy" is a reggae song written by Peter Tosh and originally recorded by Bob Marley and the Wailers for their 1970 album Soul Rebels. Tosh later included it on his 1976 debut solo album, Legalize It. The British rock musician Eric Clapton recorded the song during his sessions for his 2013 studio album Old Sock. Although his take on "No Sympathy" was not released on the original Old Sock album, it was made available as an online digital single and was released on the limited bonus track edition of the album.

== Chart performance ==
As a B-side to the "Every Little Thing" maxi single release, the title entered Billboard magazine's Adult Contemporary chart, peaking at position 26 in 2013.
