= Soul Rebels =

Studio album by Bob Marley and the Wailers
- Released: December 1970
- Recorded: August–November 1970
- Studios: Randy's, Kingston, Jamaica
- Genre: Reggae
- Length: 33:09
- Label: Trojan
- Producer: Lee Perry

Bob Marley and the Wailers chronology
The Wailing Wailers (1965)	Soul Rebels (1970)	Soul Revolution Part II (1971)

Soul Rebels is the second studio album by the Wailers, their first album to be released outside Jamaica. The Wailers approached producer Lee "Scratch" Perry in August 1970 to record an entire album, and the sessions took place at Randy's recording studio (also known as Studio 17) above Randy's Record Mart at 17 North Parade in Kingston, Jamaica, until November. First issued in the UK by Trojan Records in December 1970, the album has since been re-released several times on several different labels. Perry's production is sparse and haunting, only featuring guitar, bass, drums, electronic organs, and vocals with no horns or other embellishments.

== Songs ==
The first track, "Soul Rebel", was from the first collaboration of Perry and Bob Marley. Marley initiated the idea for the song, and Perry arranged and co-wrote the music as Marley dictated the lyrics.

== Critical reception ==
Professional ratings
Review scores
Source	Rating
AllMusic	4.5/5 stars

Writing in Newsday in 1973, Robert Christgau found Soul Rebels superior to Marley and the Wailer's only American release at the time, Catch a Fire.

AllMusic gave Soul Rebels a glowing retrospective review, calling it "a strange and wonderful set of early reggae that at times plays fast and loose with the already established conventions of the genre".

== Cover ==
According to the book, I & I: The Natural Mystics, the band was not happy with the "soft porn" look of the album cover, clashing as it did with their sensibilities, and were upset that they weren't consulted on its look.

== Track listing ==
=== Original album (1970) ===
All tracks are written by Bob Marley, except where noted.

Side one
No.	Title	Writer(s)	Length
1.	"Soul Rebel"		3:19
2.	"Try Me"		2:45
3.	"It's Alright"		2:34
4.	"No Sympathy"	Peter Tosh	2:13
5.	"My Cup"	James Brown	3:34
6.	"Soul Almighty"		2:42

Side two
No.	Title	Writer(s)	Length
7.	"Rebel's Hop"	Curtis Mayfield, Norman Whitfield, Barrett Strong, Marley	2:38
8.	"Corner Stone"		2:28
9.	"400 Years"	Tosh	2:33
10.	"No Water"		2:08
11.	"Reaction"		2:41
12.	"My Sympathy"	Tosh	2:41

=== The Definitive Remastered edition (2002) ===
Current CD Version
No.	Title	Writer(s)	Length
1.	"Soul Rebel"		3:19
2.	"Try Me"		2:45
3.	"It's Alright"		2:34
4.	"No Sympathy"	Tosh	2:13
5.	"My Cup"	Brown	3:34
6.	"Soul Almighty"		2:42
7.	"Rebel's Hop"	Mayfield, Whitfield, Strong, Marley	2:38
8.	"Corner Stone"		2:28
9.	"400 Years"	Tosh	2:33
10.	"No Water"		2:08
11.	"Reaction"		2:41
12.	"My Sympathy"	Tosh	2:41
13.	"Dreamland"	Bunny Wailer	2:44
14.	"Dreamland" (version)	Wailer	2:36
15.	"Dracula"	Lee "Scratch" Perry	2:55
16.	"Soul Rebel" (version 4)		2:54
17.	"Version of Cup"	Perry	3:13
18.	"Zig Zag"	Perry	3:24
19.	"Jah Is Mighty"		2:26
20.	"Brand New Second Hand"	Tosh	3:11
21.	"Brand New Second Hand" (version)	Tosh	3:05
22.	"Downpresser"	Tosh	3:16

=== JAD Remastered edition (2004) ===
Bonus tracks
No.	Title	Length
13.	"Jah Is Mighty"	2:26
14.	"Soul Rebel" (version 4)	2:52

Also "No Sympathy (Version)" (replaces "My Sympathy", due to error)
