= Joe Higgs =

Jamaican musician (1940–1999)

- Born: Joseph Benjamin Higgs; 3 June 1940; Kingston, Jamaica
- Died: 18 December 1999 (aged 59) Los Angeles, California, US
- Genres: Rhythm & Blues, ska, rocksteady, reggae
- Instruments: Vocals, guitar
- Years active: 1958–1999
- Website: http://www.joehiggs.com/

Joseph Benjamin Higgs (3 June 1940 – 18 December 1999) was a reggae musician from Jamaica. In the late 1950s and 1960s he was part of the duo Higgs and Wilson together with Roy Wilson. A popular artist in Jamaica for four decades, he tutored younger musicians including Bob Marley and the Wailers and Jimmy Cliff.

== Biography ==
Higgs was instrumental in the foundation of modern Jamaican music, first recording in 1958 for producer and businessman (and later Jamaican Prime Minister) Edward Seaga, both as a solo artist and with Roy Wilson. He is often called the "Godfather of Reggae". His first release (with Wilson) was "Oh Manny Oh" in 1958, which was one of the first records to be pressed in Jamaica and went on to sell 50,000 copies. Higgs and Wilson also recorded for Clement "Coxsone" Dodd in the late 1950s and early 1960s. The partnership with Wilson dissolved in 1964 when Wilson emigrated to the United States. Higgs then concentrated on a solo career and also worked with Carlos Malcolm and the Afro-Jamaican Rhythms, before joining Lynn Taitt's The Soul Brothers as lead vocalist.

Higgs mentored young singers in his yard and began working with Bob Marley in 1959. In fact, it was at one of the informal music lessons Joe Higgs held in Trench Town, that Bob and Bunny Livingston met Peter Tosh. Marley acknowledged later on that Higgs had been an influential figure for him, while Higgs described their time together: "I am the one who taught the Wailers the craft, who taught them certain voice technique". It was Higgs who introduced the Wailers to Dodd in 1963.

Higgs has also been described as the "Father of Reggae" by Jimmy Cliff. For a while Higgs toured with Cliff, acting as his bandleader as well as writing songs for Cliff including "Dear Mother", and also performed with The Wailers on their US tour when Bunny Wailer refused to go on the tour in 1973. Higgs wrote "Steppin' Razor" in 1967 as his entry in the Festival Song Contest, later recorded by Tosh without crediting Higgs. Higgs later won a court case to establish his rights as composer but never received any profits from the song's success.

Higgs won the Jamaican Tourist Board Song Competition in 1972 with "Invitation to Jamaica", released as a single on his own Elevation label, and much of his best-known solo work was issued in the 1970s. Singles included "More Slavery" (released on Micron), "Creation" (Ethnic Fight), "Let Us Do Something" (Elevation), and "World Is Upside Down" (Island). His debut album, Life of Contradiction, had been recorded in 1972 for Island Records, but as Island boss Chris Blackwell felt that it would be difficult to market it remained unreleased until 1975, when it was issued by Micron Music, and has been described as "a seminally sophisticated work combining reggae, jazz, and rhythm and blues influences to create a new texture that would have a profound effect on the best Jamaican music to follow". As well as The Wailers, Higgs also helped several other singers and groups including The Wailing Souls.

His second album, Unity Is Power, was released in 1979 and further singles followed on Cliff's Sunpower label and Bunny Wailer's Solominic imprint. His 1983 single "So It Go", with a lyric critical of the Jamaican government of the day was banned from airplay and led to harassment which would eventually lead to Higgs relocating to Los Angeles, where he lived for the rest of his life. Two further albums were released in the 1980s, Triumph (1985) and Family (1988), and in 1990 he recorded Blackman Know Yourself on which he was backed by the Wailers Band, and includes covers of the Marley/Lee Perry songs "Small Axe" and "Sun Is Shining". In 1995, his final album was issued, Joe and Marcia Together, a collaboration with his daughter.

A majority of Higgs' songs were connected to his impoverished life in Trenchtown where he grew up. Higgs considered that it was out of the poverty and violence of Kingston's shantytowns such as Trenchtown and Johnstown that the reggae music had grown. Before reggae hit big on the western music scene with Bob Marley, it was understood as a "ghetto music". Higgs was the very first artist out the ghetto music scene to have lyrics which primarily dealt with everyday troubles. In his own words:

"Music is a matter of struggle. It's not good that it's known you're from Trenchtown. Reggae is a confrontation of sound. Reggae has to have that basic vibrant sound that is to be heard in the ghetto. It's like playing the drum and bass very loud. Those are the basic sounds. A classical reggae should be accepted in any part of the world. Freedom, that's what it's asking for; acceptance, that's what it needs, and understanding, that's what reggae's saying. You have a certain love come from hard struggle, long suffering. Through pain you guard yourself with that hope of freedom, not to give up...""

Higgs died of cancer on 18 December 1999 at Kaiser Hospital in Los Angeles. At the time of his death he was working with Roger Steffens on an official biography, and had been working on a collaboration with Irish artists, including John Alexander Reed and Ronald Padget for the Green on Black album. He was survived by twelve children, including his daughter Marcia, who is a rapper, and son Peter, a studio guitarist.

In 2006, the Joe Higgs Music Awards were established in his honour.

== Quotations ==
From memorial website:

- "Joe Higgs was a brother amongst the Wailers for years. He was encouragement, and he inspired us and kept us together." – Peter Tosh (1976)
- "We looked up to Joe Higgs. He was something like a musical guardian for us. He was a more professional singer, because he was working for years with a fella named Roy Wilson as Higgs & Wilson. They had a lotta hits and they had the knowledge of the harmony techniques, so he taught us [The Wailers] them. And he helped in the studio, to work out our different parts." – Bunny Wailer (1980's)
- "Joe Higgs helped me understand that music. He taught me many things." – Bob Marley

== Discography ==
- Life of Contradiction (1975), Micron
- Unity is Power (1979), Island/1 Stop
- Triumph (1985), Alligator
- Family (1988), Shanachie
- Blackman Know Yourself (1990), Shanachie – Joe Higgs with the Wailers Band
- Joe and Marcia Together (1995)

Contributions to other albums

- Negril (LP, 1975. Micron Music Ltd.) (CD, 2003. 3D Japan), session musician
