= Sun Is Shining (Bob Marley and the Wailers song) =

1971 song by Bob Marley and the Wailers

Song by Bob Marley and the Wailers

from the album Kaya
- Released: 1978
- Genre: Reggae
- Length: 4:58
- Label: Tuff Gong, Island
- Songwriters: Bob Marley, Lee Perry

"Sun Is Shining" is a song by Jamaican reggae band Bob Marley & the Wailers, first appearing on the Lee Perry-produced album Soul Revolution Part II in 1971, and then on African Herbsman in 1973. Marley later re-recorded the song for his 1978 album Kaya. In 1999, a remix by "Bob Marley vs. Funkstar De Luxe" reached number one on the US Billboard Dance Club Play chart and number three on the UK Singles Chart.

Although having become one of the most popular Marley songs, "Sun Is Shining" used to be a fairly unknown and seldom-performed number during Marley's lifetime. Up to date, only two live performances are documented; however, both took place under special circumstances. On 16 June 1978, Marley performed at The Music Inn in Lenox, Massachusetts, a concert having been rescheduled twice since 1976, and played an over 2-hour set. "Sun Is Shining" was the opening song, reportedly included spontaneously as it stopped to rain. On 23 July 1978, Marley performed an outdoor concert at the Santa Barbara Bowl that included "Sun Is Shining" as opening song; just before the song, Marley introduced the performance by referring to Haile Selassie's birthday on the same day.

== Certifications ==
Certifications for "Sun Is Shining"
Region	Certification	Certified units/sales
New Zealand (RMNZ)	Gold	15,000^{‡}
^{‡} Sales+streaming figures based on certification alone.

== Bob Marley vs. Funkstar De Luxe version ==
"Sun Is Shining"

Single by Bob Marley vs. Funkstar De Luxe

from the album Keep on Moving (It's Too Funky in Here)
- Released: 13 September 1999
- Genre: EDM
- Length: 3:59
- Label: Club Tools
- Songwriters: Bob Marley, Lee Perry
- Producer: Funkstar De Luxe

Bob Marley singles chronology
"What Goes Around Comes Around" (1996)	"Sun Is Shining" (1999)	"Turn Your Lights Down Low" (1999)

Funkstar De Luxe singles chronology
"Falculator" (1998)	"Sun Is Shining" (1999)	"Rainbow Country" (2000)

The song was remixed in 1999 by Danish house music producer Funkstar De Luxe. It was released on the Kontor Records sub-label Club Tools, credited to Bob Marley vs. Funkstar De Luxe. The producer was the first to receive clearance from the Marley estate to release official remixes of the late singer's music (although bootleg mixes of Marley tunes have circulated in the club world for years).

The song reached number one in Iceland and on the American and Canadian dance charts, and it debuted at number three on the UK Singles Chart—Marley's highest-charting single in that country. It also became a top-10 hit in Belgium, Finland, Ireland, Norway and Switzerland.

=== Track listing ===
1. "Sun Is Shining" (Radio De Luxe edit) – 3:59
2. "Sun Is Shining" (ATB airplay mix) – 3:48
3. "Sun Is Shining" (Rainbow mix) – 6:03
4. "Sun Is Shining" (ATB club mix) – 6:55
5. "Sun Is Shining" (Funkstar club mix) – 8:14

=== Charts ===
==== Weekly charts ====
Weekly chart performance for "Sun Is Shining"
Chart (1999–2000)	Peak position
Australia (ARIA)	28
Austria (Ö3 Austria Top 40)	23
Belgium (Ultratop 50 Flanders)	7
Belgium (Ultratop 50 Wallonia)	10
Canada Top Singles (RPM)	28
Canada Dance/Urban (RPM)	1
Denmark (IFPI)	4
Europe (Eurochart Hot 100)	6
Finland (Suomen virallinen lista)	8
France (SNEP)	12
Germany (GfK)	19
Iceland (Íslenski Listinn Topp 40)	1
Ireland (IRMA)	7
Italy (Musica e dischi)	11
Italy Airplay (Music & Media)	7
Netherlands (Dutch Top 40)	7
Netherlands (Single Top 100)	11
New Zealand (Recorded Music NZ)	11
Norway (VG-lista)	8
Scottish Singles Sales (Official Charts)	4
Spain (Promusicae)	6
Sweden (Sverigetopplistan)	17
Switzerland (Schweizer Hitparade)	7
UK Singles (Official Charts)	3
UK Indie (Official Charts)	1
US Dance Club Play (Billboard)	1
US Maxi-Singles Sales (Billboard)	7

==== Year-end charts ====
1999 year-end chart performance for "Sun Is Shining"
Chart (1999)	Position
Belgium (Ultratop 50 Flanders)	67
Belgium (Ultratop 50 Wallonia)	74
Europe (Eurochart Hot 100)	31
Europe (Radio Top 50)	64
Europe Border Breakers (Music & Media)	13
France (SNEP)	63
Italy (Musica e dischi)	51
Netherlands (Dutch Top 40)	55
Netherlands (Single Top 100)	99
New Zealand (RIANZ)	41
Sweden (Hitlistan)	87
UK Singles (OCC)	68
UK Airplay (Music Week)	43
UK Club Chart (Music Week)	49

2000 year-end chart performance for "Sun Is Shining"
Chart (2000)	Position
US Maxi-Singles Sales (Billboard)	17

=== Certifications ===
Certifications for "Sun Is Shining"
Region	Certification	Certified units/sales
Belgium (BRMA)	Gold	25,000^{*}
France (SNEP)	Gold	250,000^{*}
New Zealand (RMNZ)	Gold	5,000^{*}
Sweden (GLF)	Gold	15,000^{^}
United Kingdom (BPI)	Silver	200,000^{^}
^{*} Sales figures based on certification alone.^{^} Shipments figures based on certification alone.
