= Upsetter Records =

- Founded: 1968
- Founder: Lee "Scratch" Perry
- Defunct: 1978
- Distributor: Trojan Records
- Genre: Reggae
- Country of origin: Jamaica
- Location: Kingston, Jamaica

Upsetter Records was a Jamaican record label set up by Lee "Scratch" Perry in 1968. Perry also opened the Upsetter Record Shop where he sold the records he produced.

Lee "Scratch" Perry worked for Coxsone Dodd's Studio One record label and later for Joe Gibbs's Amalgamated Records through the 1950s and 1960s. Amid personal and financial disagreements, he left Gibbs in 1968 and founded Upsetter Records, which became the outlet for his independent productions and the base for the musicians who formed the Upsetters. According to Lloyd Bradley, Perry attracted high-calibre players less through money than through the creative freedom he offered, allowing the label to become a major site of experimentation in early reggae production. The label took its name from Perry's nickname, "The Upsetter", which he adopted after his 1968 single "I Am the Upsetter", a musical dismissal of his former boss Coxsone Dodd. The house band became known as the Upsetters.

Upsetter Records signed a distribution deal with the U.K. based Trojan Records, and had its first success with Perry and the Upsetters' 1969 album Return of Django, which became a hit in the U.K. The label proceeded to release productions by many major Jamaican performers, including the Wailers and early sessions of Bob Marley and the Wailers.

In 1973, The Wailers left and signed up with Island Records. Aston "Family Man" Barrett and his brother Carlton (Carlie) Barrett left the Upsetters and formed the Wailers Band, the backing band of the Wailers, and later part of Bob Marley and the Wailers. Despite the setback, Perry turned his fortunes around when, in the same year, he built Black Ark Studios — which recorded for Upsetter Records and other labels, becoming a center of creativity in reggae music.

Upsetter Records continued to release records throughout the 1970s, and in 1981, Perry had a breakdown and burned down Black Ark Studios.

In 1989, after King Tubby's death, the studio was looted.

In 2014, Lee Perry reopened the label exclusively for the release of his new album Back On the Controls with London producer Daniel Boyle.
