= Il Divo discography =

- Studio albums: 10
- Live albums: 2
- Compilation albums: 1

The discography of multinational classical crossover vocal group Il Divo, contains ten studio albums, two live albums, one compilation album, singles and duets and collaborations.

Their debut album, Il Divo, was released in 2004 and went to number one in 13 countries worldwide. The Christmas Collection album was released in October 2005 and was certified 2× Platinum in Canada and Platinum in America. Their third album, Ancora, was released in 2005; it went to number one in America selling more than 150,000 copies during its first week. Their fourth album, Siempre, was released in 2006; it went to number one in ten countries. Their fifth album, The Promise was released in 2008 and went to number one in seven countries, Their sixth album, Wicked Game in 2011, their seventh album, A Musical Affair in 2013 and their eighth album, Amor & Pasión in 2015.

== Albums ==
=== Studio albums ===
List of studio albums, with selected chart positions and certifications
Title	Album details	Peak chart positions										Certifications
Title	Album details	UK	AUS	AUT	CAN	FRA	GER	IRE	NLD	SWI	US	Certifications
Il Divo	Released: 1 November 2004; Label: Sony Music / Syco; Formats: CD, digital download	1	1	2	1	4	2	2	1	2	4	BPI: 5× Platinum; ARIA: 3× Platinum; BVMI: Gold; IFPI AUT: Platinum; IFPI SWI: Platinum; MC: 3× Platinum; NVPI: 2× Platinum; RIAA: Platinum; SNEP: 2× Gold
The Christmas Collection	Released: 25 October 2005; Label: Sony Music / Syco; Formats: CD, digital download	—	16	18	1	122	75	—	4	13	14	BPI: Gold; ARIA: Gold; IFPI SWI: Gold; MC: 2× Platinum; RIAA: Platinum
Ancora	Released: 7 November 2005; Label: Sony Music / Syco; Formats: CD, digital download	1	1	6	1	9	18	3	2	4	1	BPI: 3× Platinum; ARIA: 4× Platinum; BVMI: Gold; IFPI AUT: Platinum; IFPI SWI: Gold; MC: 3× Platinum; RIAA: Gold; SNEP: Platinum
Siempre	Released: 21 November 2006; Label: Sony Music / Syco; Formats: CD, digital download	2	2	9	1	10	22	2	1	1	6	BPI: 2× Platinum; ARIA: 2× Platinum; IFPI AUT: Gold; IFPI SWI: Gold; MC: 3× Platinum; NVPI: Platinum; RIAA: Platinum; SNEP: Gold
The Promise	Released: 10 November 2008; Label: Sony Music / Syco; Formats: CD, digital download	1	5	11	2	22	24	2	1	6	5	BPI: Platinum; ARIA: Platinum; IFPI AUT: Gold; IFPI SWI: Gold; RIAA: Gold
Wicked Game	Released: 4 November 2011; Label: Sony Music / Syco; Formats: CD, digital download	6	11	12	11	—	28	15	2	3	10	BPI: Gold; ARIA: Gold; IFPI SWI: Gold; MC: Gold
A Musical Affair	Released: 5 November 2013; Label: Sony Music / Syco; Formats: CD, digital download	5	40	16	—	42	64	21	6	24	19	BPI: Gold; SNEP: Gold
Amor & Pasión	Released: 28 October 2015; Label: Sony Music / Syco; Formats: CD, digital download	13	80	43	—	—	—	25	6	22	135	BPI: Silver
Timeless	Released: 10 August 2018; Label: Decca Gold; Formats: CD, digital download	13	37	50	—	—	76	—	17	7	—	
For Once in My Life: A Celebration of Motown	Released: 16 July 2021; Label: Decca Gold; Formats: CD, digital download, streaming	—	—	—	—	—	—	—	35	—	—	
XX	Released: 9 February 2024; Label: Il Divo, Thirty Tigers; Formats: CD, digital download, streaming	—	—	—	—	—	—	—	34	—	—	
"—" denotes album that did not chart or was not released.

=== Live albums ===
List of live albums, with selected chart positions and certifications
Title	Album details	Peak chart positions					
Title	Album details	AUT	CAN	FRA	IRE	NLD	SWI
An Evening with Il Divo: Live in Barcelona	Released: 1 December 2009; Label: Syco; Formats: CD, digital download	26	19	198	29	9	15
Live in Japan	Released: 17 November 2014; Label: Syco; Formats: CD, digital download	—	—	—	98	55	—
"—" denotes album that did not chart or was not released

=== Compilation albums ===
List of compilation albums
Title	Album details	Peak chart positions						
Title	Album details	UK	AUT	GER	IRE	NLD	SWI	US
The Greatest Hits	Released: 4 December 2012; Label: Syco, Sony Music; Formats: CD, digital download	17	13	43	23	5	16	25

=== Special editions ===
List of special editions
Title	Album details	Notes
Il Divo Gift Pack	Released: 1 November 2004; Label: Syco Music; Formats: CD, digital download	CD edition includes: Il Divo; The Christmas Collection
Christmas Collection. The Yule Log	Released: 25 October 2005; Label: Syco Music; Formats: CD, digital download	Edition includes: Album with Christmas songs; Unpublished images of Il Divo
Il Divo Collezione	Released: 7 November 2006; Label: Syco Music; Formats: CD, digital download, script	A box set that includes: CD: Il Divo, Ancora and The Christmas Collection; DVD: Encore; 20-page booklet with rare photos and an individual poster signed
The Promise Luxury Edition	Released: 7 November 2008; Label: Syco Music; Formats: CD, digital download	Edition includes: The album The Promise; DVD with videos and interviews.
Wicked Game Gift Edition	Released: 28 November 2011; Label: Syco Music; Formats: CD, digital download	Edition includes: The album Wicked Game; Direct Live in London
Wicked Game Limited Edition Deluxe Box Set	Released: 28 November 2011; Label: Syco Music; Formats: CD, digital download, Book	Edition includes: The album Wicked Game; Direct Live in London; Book 150 pages: Features photos in black and white.; Personal photographs and biographies.
The Greatest Hits Deluxe Limited Edition	Released: 26 November 2012; Label: Syco Music; Formats: CD, digital download, Book	Special edition contains: Albums: Il Divo; Ancora; Siempre; The Promise; Wicked Game; The Christmas Collection and The Greatest Hits; DVD: Encore; Live at the Greek Theater; At the Coliseum; An Evening with Il Divo: Live in Barcelona; Live in London; The 5 books of Il Divo; Opera glasses in an embroidered velvet bag.; Limited to 3,000 cases worldwide. All personally signed.
A Musical Affair Exclusive	Released: 5 November 2013; Label: Syco Music; Formats: CD, digital download	Edition includes: Album A Musical Affair; Making of A Musical Affair; Calendar 15 pages of Il Divo
A Musical Affair. French Version	Released: 24 November 2014; Label: Syco Music; Formats: CD, digital download	Edition includes: Album A Musical Affair; Partially or totally unpublished duets in French
Live in Japan. Japan Version	Released: 1 December 2014; Label: Syco Music; Formats: CD, digital download, Blu-ray	Live from Budokan Theater in Tokyo.; Includes songs "Flowers Will Bloom" and "Furusato".
"—" denotes album that did not chart or was not released

== EPs ==
List of EPs
Title	EP details
A Merry Little Christmas	Released: 3 November 2023; Label: Il Divo, Thirty Tigers; Formats: digital download

== Singles ==
List of singles, with selected chart positions, showing year released and album name
Title	Year	Peak chart positions						Album
Title	Year	AUT	FRA	GER	IRE	SWI	US AC	Album
"Mama"	2005	—	—	—	—	—	—	Il Divo
"Regresa a mi (Unbreak My Heart)"	2005	—	88	—	—	—	33	Il Divo
"O Holy Night"	2005	—	—	—	28	—	—	Ancora
"I Believe in You (Je crois en toi)" (with Celine Dion)	2006	—	30	—	—	35	31	Ancora
"The Time of Our Lives" (featuring Toni Braxton)	2006	24	—	17	—	8	—	Libra
"Nights in White Satin (notte di luce)"	2006	—	—	—	—	81	—	Siempre
"Amazing Grace"	2008	—	—	—	—	—	—	The Promise
"Wicked Game (Melanchonia)"	2011	—	—	—	—	—	—	Wicked Game
"Por una cabeza"	2015	—	—	—	—	—	—	Amor & Pasión
"Si voy a perderte (Don't Wanna Lose You)"	2015	—	—	—	—	—	—	Amor & Pasión
"Bésame mucho"	2015	—	—	—	—	—	—	Amor & Pasión
"Abrázame"	2015	—	—	—	—	—	—	Amor & Pasión
"Quizás, quizás, quizás"	2015	—	—	—	—	—	—	Amor & Pasión
"For Once in My Life"	2021	—	—	—	—	—	—	For Once in My Life
"My Girl"	2021	—	—	—	—	—	—	For Once in My Life
"Crazy"	2023	—	—	—	—	—	—	XX
"No Tengo Nada"	2023	—	—	—	—	—	—	XX
"Perfect"	2024	—	—	—	—	—	—	XX
"—" denotes single that did not chart or was not released	2024							

=== Other singles ===
- "Volta Pra mim", Portuguese version of "Regresa a mí (Unbreak My Heart)"
- "With You I'm Born Again (Por ti vuelvo a nacer)"
- "I Believe I Can Fly (Se que puedo volar)"
- "Bridge over Troubled Water"
- "The Impossible Dream"
- "Hana wa Saku"
- "Furusato"
- "We Wish You a Merry Christmas"

== Duets and collaborations ==
=== In soundtracks ===
==== Events ====
- FIFA World Cup: Il Divo & Toni Braxton "Time of Our Lives"

==== TV soaps ====
- TV soaps Sortilegio, song "Sortilegio de amor"

=== Duets ===
- Anggun ("Who Wants to Live Forever")
- Barbra Streisand ("The Music of the Night", "Somewhere", "Evergreen")
- Celine Dion ("I Believe in You (Je crois en toi)")
- Engelbert Humperdick ("Spanish Eyes")
- Florent Pagny ("Belle")
- Heather Headley ("Can You Feel the Love Tonight?")
- Hélène Segara ("Memory")
- Juan Gabriel ("Amor eterno")
- Katherine Jenkins ("Somewhere")
- Kristin Chenoweth ("Do You Hear What I Hear?", "All I Ask of You")
- Lea Salonga ("A Whole New World", "Time to say goodbye (Con Te Partirò)", "Can You Feel the Love Tonight?")
- Leona Lewis ("Somewhere")
- Lisa Angell ("Can You Feel the Love Tonight?")
- Mazz Murray ("Memory", "Time to say goodbye (Con Te Partirò)", "Music of the Night")
- Michael Ball ("Love Changes Everything")
- Natasha St-Pier ("Aimer")
- Nicole Scherzinger ("Memory")
- Sonia Lacen ("L'envie d'aimer")
- Vincent Niclo ("Le Temps Des Cathédrales")

=== Collaborations records of other artists ===
- On Ne Change Pas with Celine Dion on "I Believe in You (Je crois en toi)" (2005)
- Voices from the FIFA World Cup on the song "The Time of Our Lives" (2006)
- Libra by Toni Braxton on the song "The Time of Our Lives" (2006)
- Live in Concert by Barbra Streisand on the song "Evergreen" (2006)
- Engelbert Calling by Engelbert Humperdick on the song "Spanish Eyes" (2014)
- Los Dúos by Juan Gabriel on the song "Amor eterno" (2015)
