= Carlos Marín =

Spanish singer (1968–2021)

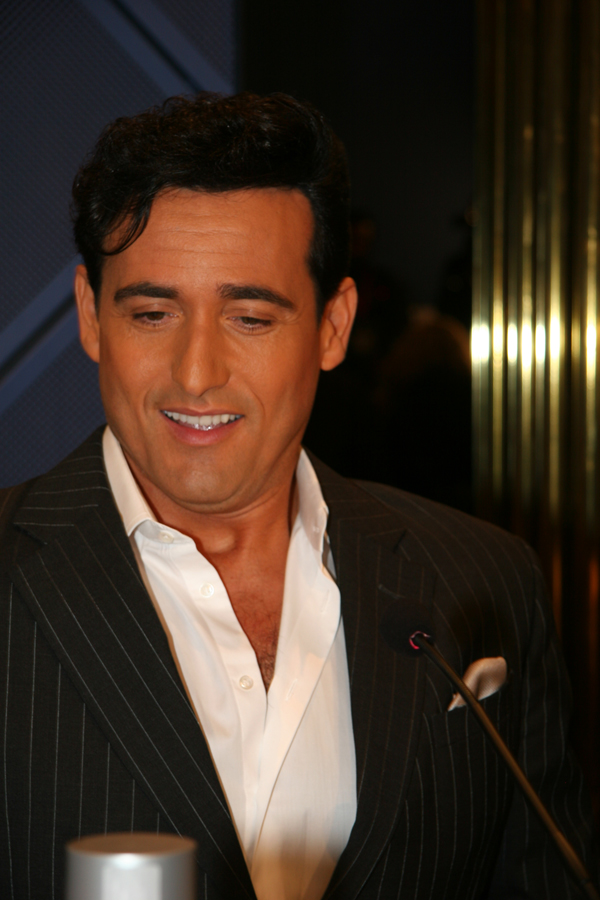
- Marín in 2008

Background information
- Born: Carlos Marín Menchero; 13 October 1968; Rüsselsheim, West Germany
- Origin: Madrid, Spain
- Died: 19 December 2021 (aged 53) Manchester, England
- Cause of death: Complications due to COVID-19
- Genres: Classical crossover; opera; romantic
- Occupation: Singer
- Years active: 1976–2021
- Labels: Syco Music; Sony BMG; Columbia Records
- Formerly of: Il Divo
- Website: carlosmarin.es

Carlos Marín Menchero (13 October 1968 – 19 December 2021) was a Spanish baritone and a member of the classical crossover group Il Divo, which has sold over 28 million records worldwide.

== Early life ==
Born in Rüsselsheim, West Germany, and raised in Madrid, Spain, Marín started his career in music early in life, recording his first album when he was eight years old, produced by Dutch singer-songwriter and record producer Pierre Kartner. The record, named The Little Caruso, contained songs like "O Sole Mio" and "Granada". At eight years old, he sang "Granada" in front of an audience of 800 people. At age ten he recorded a second album called Mijn Lieve Mama (My Dear Mother). This musical beginning led him to study piano and solfeggio. During this period Marín lived in the Netherlands in Eindhoven, but moved back to Spain when he was twelve. In Spain he won several awards in television contests like "Gente Joven" (Young People) and "Nueva Gente" (New People) in TVE (Spanish Television) when he was 15 and in his 20s. During this time he also started to sing on live television shows accompanied by an orchestra.

He earned through the years an important reputation as a musical performer, cultivating different musical genres and receiving excellent reviews from critics. He made a name for himself in the music industry, participating in several musical contests; the "Jacinto Guerrero", "Francisco Alonso", and "Julián Gayarre" in 1996, where he won second place in male performers, among others.

He performed in several musicals, starting in 1993 as Marius in Les Misérables, and afterwards Beauty and the Beast (where he had an accident that left him with a ruptured tendon in his calf and took six months to recover), Grease (where he played the role of Vince Fontaine), El Diluvio Que Viene (the Spanish language version of the Italian musical "Aggiungi un posto a tavola"), and covering for José Sacristán in Man from La Mancha. He participated also in the production of La Magia De Broadway (Broadway Magic) and Peter Pan (in theater and CD), in this musical he shared also the tasks of musical direction with Alberto Quintero.

He sang in Henry Selick's animated film, The Nightmare Before Christmas, and he was also the Prince's singing voice in Disney's Spanish version of Cinderella, produced in the year 2000.

Marín took vocal lessons with Alfredo Kraus, Montserrat Caballé, and Jaume Aragall.

In later years he won acclaim as primo baritono in several operas, including La Traviata, The Barber of Seville, La Bohème, Lucia Di Lammermoor, and Madame Butterfly. Some of his most distinguished opera performances included Mercutio in Campoamor (Oviedo), Don Giglio in La Capricciosa Corretta (highly recommended for opera lovers), or in Damut's version of Marina.

Marín also participated in zarzuela (Spanish operetta). He participated in the zarzuelas in the Jardines De Sabatini (Sabatini Gardens) in Madrid, a popular summer music venue at the Gardens of the Royal Palace of Madrid. Some of his performances in the Spanish operetta include La Gran Vía (The Great Way), La revoltosa (The Rebellious), in which he played Felipe, and La verbena de la Paloma (The Fair of the Virgin of la Paloma), in which he played Julián.

== Il Divo ==
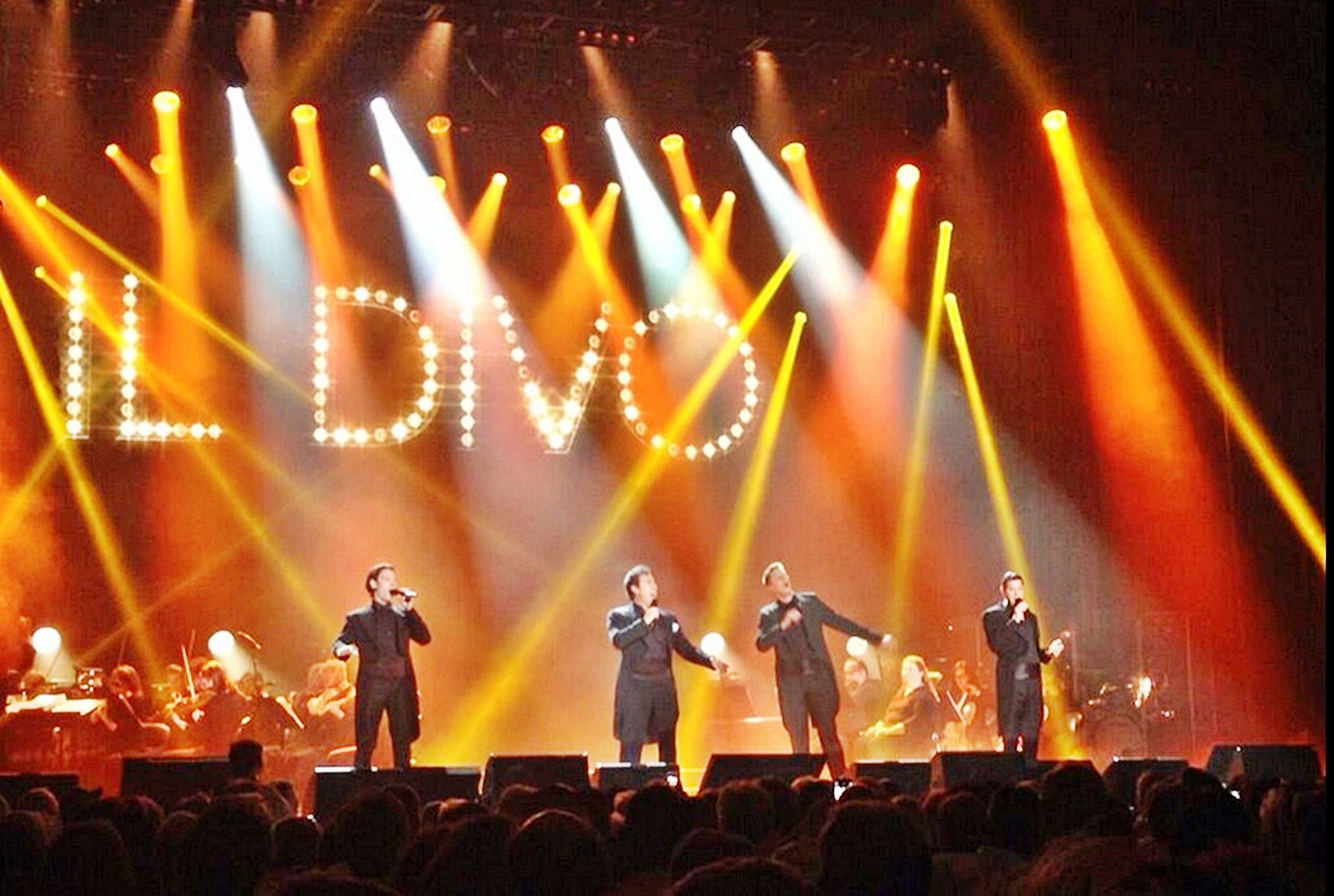
Il Divo

In December 2003, he became a member of the international musical quartet Il Divo along with Urs Bühler (Switzerland), Sébastien Izambard (France), and David Miller (USA).

Their debut album, Il Divo, became a worldwide multiplatinum selling record when released in November 2004, entering the Billboard charts at number four and selling five million copies worldwide in less than a year and knocking Robbie Williams from the number one spot in the charts. Their second album, Ancora, was released on 7 November 2005 in the United Kingdom. Il Divo's third album, Siempre, was released on 21 November 2006 in the United States and on 27 November 2006 internationally. Their album, The Promise, was released on 10 November 2008 (world) and on 18 November 2008 (US), and shot straight to number 1 in the UK.

On 1 December 2009, Il Divo released their album An Evening with Il Divo (Live in Barcelona) with their single "Unbreak my Heart" turning into another success on the charts. That same year Il Divo were chosen to sing Sortilegio de Amor, the soundtrack for the Mexican Televisa soap opera, Sortilegio, written by the Brazilian songwriter Denisse de Kalaffe. In 2011 Il Divo received the Classical Brit Award, Artist of the Decade. In June the same year, Il Divo were named Musical Ambassador in Japan and were asked to sing "Time to Say Goodbye" for the Japanese movie Andalucia.

== Carlos Marín en Concierto ==
Parallel to his presence in Il Divo, Marín started his own solo show performing for the first time in Madrid (Spain), where he gave four concerts at the Compac Gran Via Theater in June 2011, continuing with these solo concerts in Campeche (Mexico) 2014, Ciudad del Carmen (Mexico) 2015, Madrid (Spain) 2015, Mexico DF – Teatro Metropolitan 2016 which kicked off his first World Tour to include US, Spain, Mexico, South America and Japan.

In September 2016, Marín released his first personal DVD/CD Worldwide, the result of the recording done during the Show at the Compac Gran Via Theater in Madrid, January 2016, where he sold out every night for 6 shows straight and played spectators from all over the world.

== Personal life ==
Marín married Geraldine Larrosa at Disneyland in California, in June 2006, after a 13-year relationship. After fewer than three years of marriage, they divorced in early 2009.

== Illness and death ==
During the first Christmas tour since 2020, due to the COVID-19 pandemic, Carlos Marin contracted a virus. On 7 December 2021, Marin was hospitalized in Manchester, England. He was subsequently put into a medically induced coma, and died on 19 December, at the age of 53. According to his sister, Marin had been vaccinated. On 27 December 2021 the wake for Marín was held in Madrid; a funeral took place the next day on 28 December. Marín was buried at the Cementerio de la Almudena in Madrid. A memorial service was held 3 June 2022 in the crypt of the Almudena Cathedral in Madrid.

== Discography ==
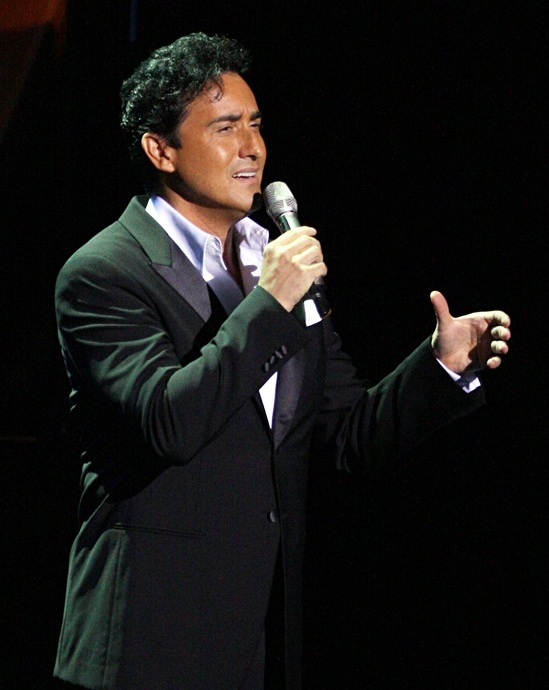
Marín performing in 2012

=== Solo ===
- Studio albums:
1. Little Caruso (1976)
2. Mijn Lieve Mama (My Dear Mother) (1978)
- Opera and musicals:
- La revoltosa (1995)
- La verbena de la Paloma (1995)
- Jekyll & Hyde, The Musical: Promo (2000)
- Live albums:
1. En Concierto (2016)

=== Il Divo ===
- Studio albums:
1. Il Divo (2004)
2. Ancora (2005)
3. Siempre (2006)
4. The Promise (2008)
5. Wicked Game (2011)
6. A Musical Affair (2013)
7. Amor & Pasión (2015)
8. Timeless (2018)
9. For Once In My Life: A Celebration Of Motown (2021)
- Seasonal album:
1. The Christmas Collection (2005)
- Compilations:
1. The Greatest Hits (2012)
- Live albums:
1. An Evening with Il Divo: Live in Barcelona (2009)
2. Live in Japan (2014)
- Special editions:
1. Il Divo: Gift Edition (2005)
2. Il Divo Collezione (2006)
3. Christmas Collection: The Yule Log (2006)
4. The Promise. Luxury Edition (2008)
5. Wicked Game: Gift Edition (2011)
6. Wicked Game: Limited Edition Deluxe Box Set (2011)
7. The Greatest Hits: Gift Edition (2012)
8. The Greatest Hits: Deluxe Limited Edition (2012)
9. A Musical Affair: Exclusive Gift Edition (2014)
10. A Musical Affair: French Versión (2014)
11. Live in Japan: Japan Versión (2014)

== Videography ==
=== Il Divo ===
1. 2004 – Live at Gotham Hall
2. 2005 – Encore
3. 2005 – Mamá
4. 2006 – The Yule Log: The Christmas Collection
5. 2006 – Live at the Greek Theater
6. 2008 – At the Coliseum
7. 2009 – An Evening with Il Divo: Live in Barcelona
8. 2011 – Live in London
9. 2014 – Live in Japan
10. 2016 – Live in Japan 2016
