= David Miller (tenor) =

American singer

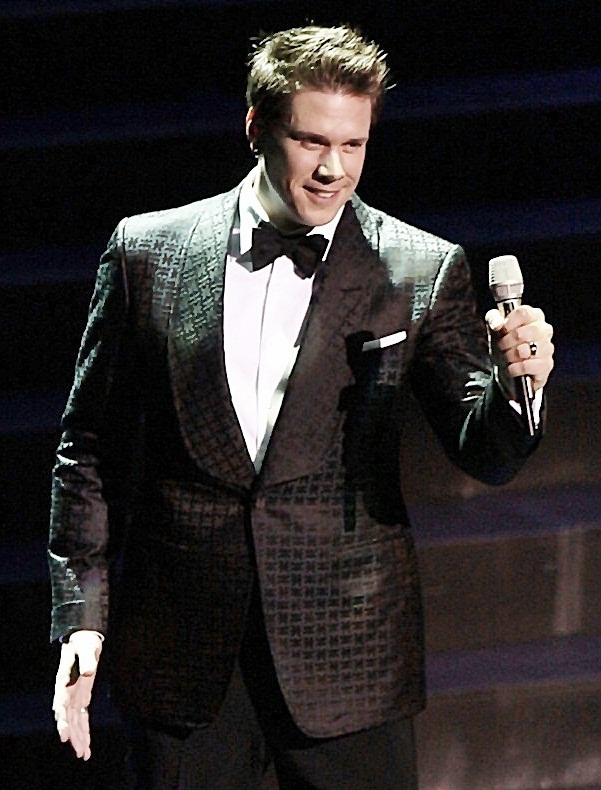
- Miller in 2012

Background information
- Born: David Miller; April 14, 1973 (age 53); San Diego, California, U.S.
- Genres: Classical crossover, opera, romantic
- Occupation: Singer
- Years active: 2000–present
- Labels: Syco, Sony BMG, Columbia

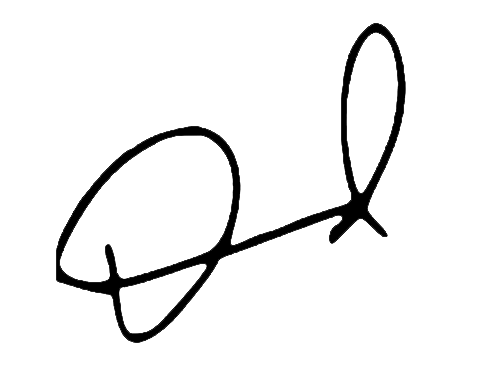
Miller's signature

David Miller (born April 14, 1973) is an American tenor. Since 2004, he has been a member of the successful classical crossover group Il Divo, who have sold over 30 million copies worldwide. As well, Miller shared a Tony Award with the other members of the ensemble cast of Baz Luhrmann's 2002 revival of La bohème in 2003.

== Background and personal life ==
Miller was born in San Diego, California, but raised in the suburbs of Denver, Colorado. As a student at Heritage High School in Littleton, he starred in high school productions as the Rooster in Annie and Noah in Two by Two. He was also a member of the Colorado Children's Chorale but only took music seriously in high school after being asked to audition for Annie due to the lack of male cast members with the ability to sing. Uninterested in his father's suggestion that he join the military, he went on to Oberlin Conservatory of Music, where he studied with Richard Miller, and graduated in 1995 with a bachelor's degree in Vocal Performance and a master's degree in Opera Theatre.

Miller has been married to soprano Sarah Joy Miller, a member of the Three Graces, since 2009. They live in New York's financial district with their dog, Cosmo, a Maltese-Havanese mix.

== Musical career ==
=== Opera ===
Miller was a member of the Pittsburgh Opera Center in 1996–1997. He first came to attention after his highly acclaimed Washington Opera debut in March 1997 as Alfredo in Giuseppe Verdi's La traviata.

On May 6, 1998, he performed, along with other opera singers, for President Bill Clinton in the White House.

In 1999, he appeared with the Los Angeles Opera in the role of Tybalt in Thor Steingraber's production of I Capuleti e i Montecchi by Vincenzo Bellini. He reprised this role at the Teatro Municipal in Santiago de Chile, and at the Savonlinna Festival in Finland.

In 2000, he made his debut with Opera Australia and at Teatro alla Scala in Milan, singing Tony in West Side Story. In 2003, he sang with the Los Angeles Philharmonic and Audra McDonald at the Hollywood Bowl in excerpts from West Side Story.

Miller made his debut in the Vlaamse Opera as Cassio in 2001 and 2002. In addition he performed in Jules Massenet's Manon in Teatro Verdi in Trieste under the baton of Daniel Oren. In the US, he sang the title role in Offenbach's The Tales of Hoffmann at the now-defunct Connecticut Opera in Hartford, Connecticut. He also interpreted the role of Percy in Donizetti's Anne Boleyn at Pittsburgh Opera with John Mauceri during 2000/2001. During the 2002/2003 season he performed in the world premiere of the opera Vita by Marco Tutino at Teatro alla Scala in Milan. He has worked with American opera companies in several roles, including Des Grieux in Manon, Romeo in Romeo et Juliette, Werther, Alfredo in La Traviata and Tamino in The Magic Flute with Opera Pacific.

His best known work to date is considered to be his role as Rodolfo in Baz Luhrmann's 2002 version of Puccini's La Boheme. This show modernized the opera in an effort to lure young audiences to Broadway. Luhrmann staged a Broadway show as he did with Moulin Rouge! and his Romeo et Juliette. Luhrmann's version of La bohème premiered in Sydney ten years before it debuted on Broadway. David was one of 3 Rodolfos in the original Broadway cast and shared Tony Award with the other members of the ensemble cast of Baz Luhrmann's 2002 revival of La bohème in 2003.

Outside of Il Divo he has also taken roles such as Don Ottavio in Mozart's Don Giovanni, Belmonte in Abduction from the Seraglio and Tom Rakewell in The Rake's Progress.

In December 2007, while Il Divo was taking a break from their world tour, David made a return to the classical opera stage. He performed in recital with the Chicago Pops Orchestra, singing a variety of tenor arias as well as some show tunes and Christmas favorites.

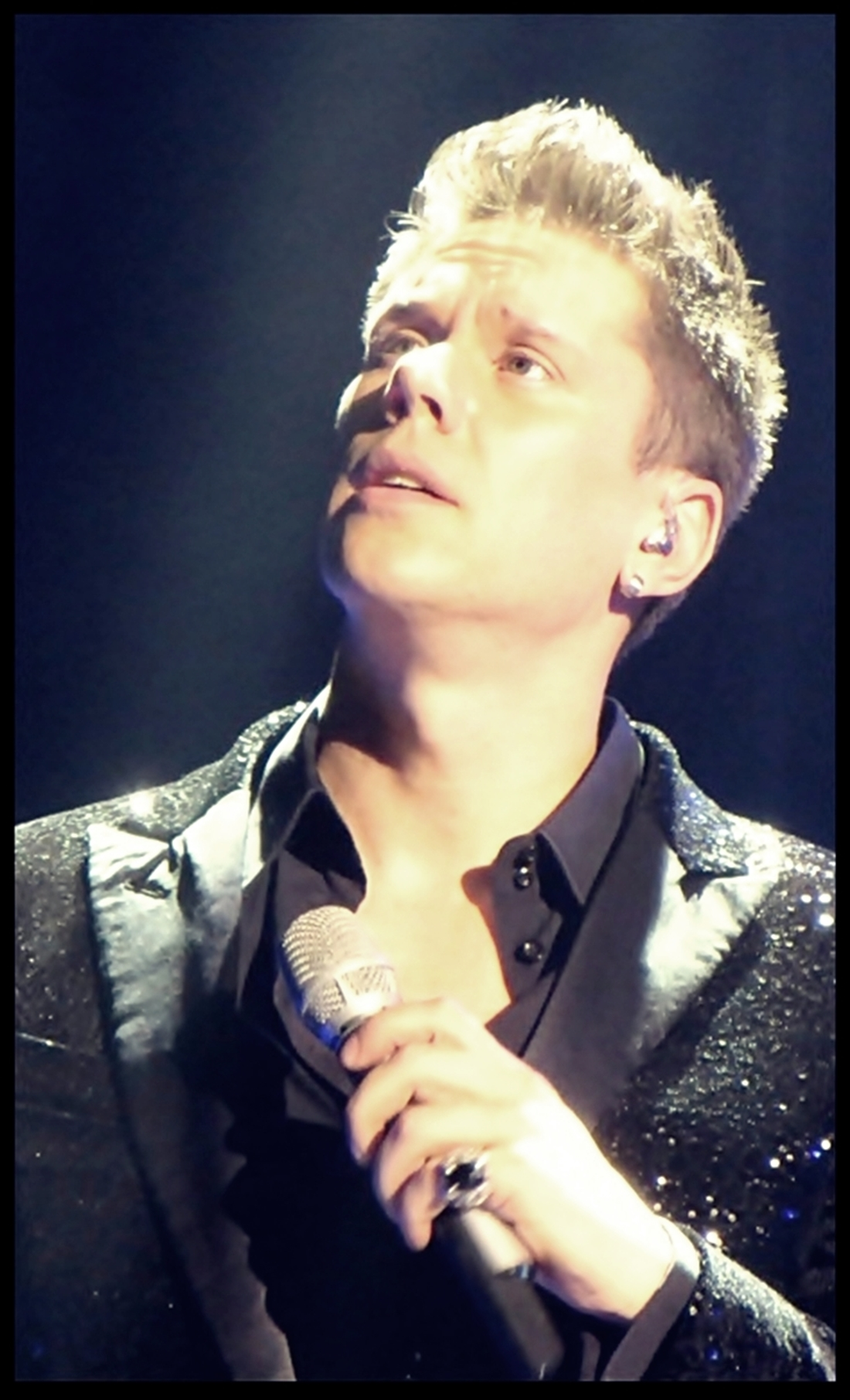
Miller in 2014

=== Il Divo ===
In December 2003, he became a member of the international musical quartet Il Divo along with Swiss operatic tenor Urs Bühler, French pop singer Sébastien Izambard, and the late Spanish baritone Carlos Marín, who was later replaced by Steven Labrie. Their eponymous first album became a worldwide multiplatinum-selling record when released in November 2004, entering Billboard at number four and selling five million copies worldwide in less than a year, knocking Robbie Williams from the number one spot in the charts. Their second album, Ancora, was released on November 7, 2005, in the United Kingdom. Il Divo's third album, Siempre, was released on November 21, 2006, in the United States and on November 27, 2006, internationally. Their next album, The Promise, was released on November 10, 2008 (internationally) and on November 17, 2008 (in Canada & the US), and went to number 1 in the UK.

== Discography ==
=== Opera ===
1. Baz Luhrmann's La Bohème – Highlights from the 2002 Original Broadway Cast

=== Il Divo ===
- Studio album:
1. 2004 – Il Divo
2. 2005 – Ancora
3. 2006 – Siempre
4. 2008 – The Promise
5. 2011 – Wicked Game
6. 2013 – A Musical Affair
7. 2015 – Amor & Pasión
8. 2018 – Timeless
- Seasonal album
1. 2005 – The Christmas Collection
- Compilations:
1. 2012 – The Greatest Hits
- Live Album:
1. 2009 – An Evening with Il Divo: Live in Barcelona
2. 2014 – Live in Japan
- Special Editions:
1. 2005 – Il Divo. Gift Edition
2. 2006 – Il Divo Collezione
3. 2006 – Christmas Collection. The Yule Log
4. 2008 – The Promise. Luxury Edition
5. 2011 – Wicked Game. Gift Edition
6. 2011 – Wicked Game. Limited Edition Deluxe Box Set
7. 2012 – The Greatest Hits. Gift Edition
8. 2012 – The Greatest Hits. Deluxe Limited Edition
9. 2014 – A Musical Affair. Exclusive Gift Edition
10. 2014 – A Musical Affair. French Versión
11. 2014 – Live in Japan. Japan Versión

== Videography ==
=== Il Divo ===
1. 2004 – Live at Gotham Hall
2. 2005 – Encore
3. 2005 – Mamá
4. 2006 – The Yule Log: The Christmas Collection
5. 2006 – Live at the Greek Theater
6. 2008 – At the Coliseum
7. 2009 – An Evening with Il Divo: Live in Barcelona
8. 2011 – Live in London
9. 2014 – Live in Japan
