= The Greatest Hits (Il Divo album) =

Greatest hits album by Il Divo
- Released: 26 November 2012
- Genre: Classical crossover
- Label: Syco Music
- Producer: Alberto Quintero

Professional ratings
Review scores
Source	Rating
AllMusic	4.5/5 stars

The Greatest Hits Is the first compilation album of English crossover classical group Il Divo, released on 26 November 2012 in Europe and 8 December 2012 in the United States.

The album was issued to celebrate Il Divo's eighth anniversary as a group. The album includes four new recordings; the classical "Il Mio Cuore Va – My Heart Will Go On", "Solo – Alone", "Siempre te amaré – I Will Always Love You", and "Can't Help Falling in Love", together with other songs chosen by fans.

== Track listing ==
=== Disc 1 ===
1. "Il mio cuore va – My Heart Will Go On"
2. "I Will Always Love You (Siempre Te Amaré)"
3. "Can't Help Falling in Love"
4. "Alone (Solo)"
5. "Senza Catene – Unchained Melody"
6. "Amazing Grace"
7. "Heroe"
8. "Regresa a mí – Unbreak My Heart"
9. "Somewhere"
10. "Passerà"
11. "All by Myself (Solo Otra Vez)"
12. "Mama"
13. "Adagio"
14. "Without You (Desde el Dia Que Te Fuiste)"
15. "Caruso"
16. "Don't Cry for Me Argentina"
17. "My Way (A Mi Manera)"
18. "Time to Say Goodbye – Con te partirò"

=== Disc 2 ===
1. "Nights in White Satin (Notte di Luce)"
2. "Nella Fantasia"
3. "Ave Maria"
4. "La Vida Sin Amor"
5. "Everytime I Look at You"
6. "The Power of Love (La Fuerza Mayor)"
7. "You Raise Me Up (Por ti seré)"
8. "Crying (Llorando)"
9. "She"
10. "Hallelujah (Aleluya)"
11. "Don't Let the Sun Go Down on Me (Pour que tu m'aimes encore)"
12. "The Impossible Dream (The Quest)"
13. "O Holy Night"

=== Deluxe limited edition ===
A deluxe limited edition of the album was released, limited to 3,000 copies. All were signed personally and contain:

- Albums: Il Divo; Ancora; Always; The Promise; Wicked Game; The Christmas Collection and The Greatest Hits
- DVDs: Encore; Live at the Greek Theater; At the Coliseum; An Evening with Il Divo: Live in Barcelona; Live in London
- Five books by Il Divo
- Binocular lenses, in a velvet embroidery

== Personnel ==
=== Il Divo ===
- Carlos Marín
- Sébastien Izambard
- David Miller
- Urs Bühler

== Charts ==
=== Weekly charts ===
Chart (2012–2013)	Peak position
Austrian Albums (Ö3 Austria)	13
Belgian Albums (Ultratop Flanders)	3
Belgian Albums (Ultratop Wallonia)	20
Dutch Albums (Album Top 100)	5
Finnish Albums (Suomen virallinen lista)	30
German Albums (Offizielle Top 100)	43
New Zealand Albums (RMNZ)	17
Portuguese Albums (AFP)	11
Scottish Albums (OCC)	17
Spanish Albums (PROMUSICAE)	10
Swedish Albums (Sverigetopplistan)	10
Swiss Albums (Schweizer Hitparade)	16
UK Albums (OCC)	17

=== Year-end charts ===
Chart (2012)	Position
Dutch Albums (Album Top 100)	92
Swedish Albums (Sverigetopplistan)	53
UK Albums (OCC)	93

Chart (2013)	Position
Belgian Albums (Ultratop Flanders)	87
Belgian Albums (Ultratop Wallonia)	152
Spanish Albums (PROMUSICAE)	48

== Certifications ==
Region	Certification	Certified units/sales
Poland (ZPAV)	Gold	10,000^{*}
Portugal (AFP)	Gold	7,500^{^}
Spain (PROMUSICAE)	Gold	20,000^{^}
^{*} Sales figures based on certification alone.^{^} Shipments figures based on certification alone.
