= Urs Bühler =

Swiss singer

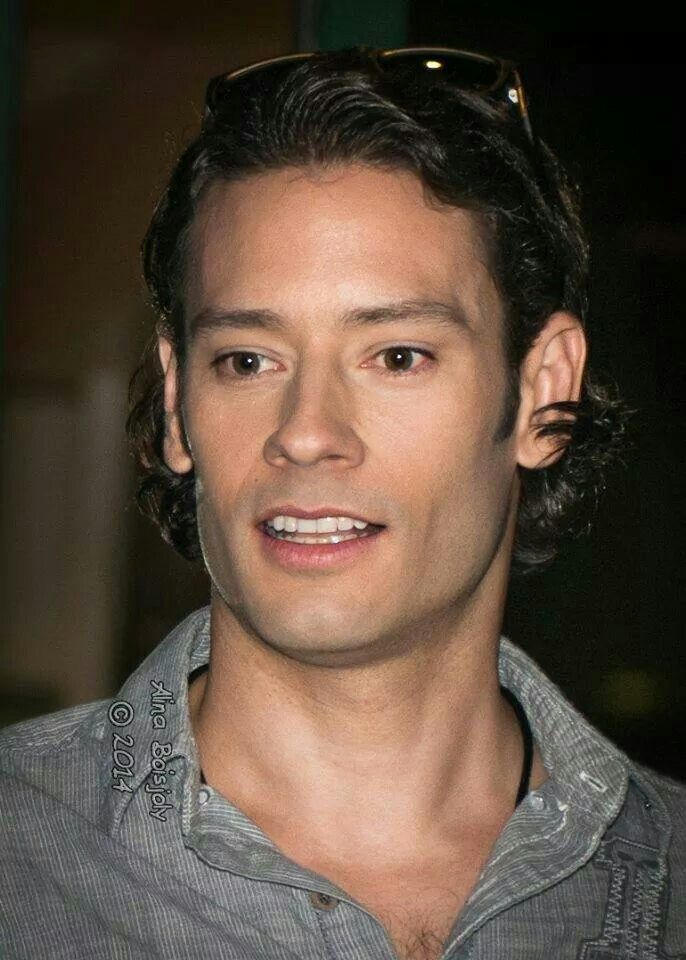
- Bühler in 2016

Background information
- Born: Urs Toni Bühler; 19 July 1971 (age 55); Willisau, Switzerland
- Genres: Classical crossover, opera, romantic, rock
- Occupation: Singer
- Years active: 2000–present
- Labels: Syco, Sony BMG, Columbia

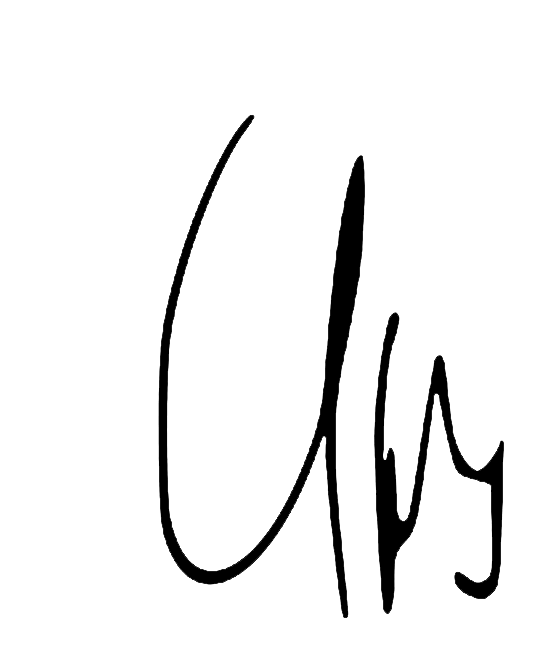
Bühler's signature

Urs Toni Bühler (born 19 July 1971) is a Swiss classically trained tenor. He is a member of the classical crossover group Il Divo, who have sold over 30 million copies worldwide.

== Early life ==
Bühler's musical training started at the age of five, when he began singing in a choir and also learned to play violin, clarinet, piano, guitar, and drums. His musical career, though, started when he was fifteen in an entirely different genre from lyrical song. He was a member of a cover band and later the lead singer of a heavy metal band called "Conspiracy" when he was seventeen years old in Luzern.

== Career ==
=== Tenor ===
At that time, Bühler was already receiving music lessons at the Academy for School and Church Music. His progress in the field led him to move to Amsterdam, where he studied voice at Sweelinck Conservatorium with Udo Reinemann, a well-known German baritone. Under the private tutoring of Swedish tenor Gösta Winbergh of the Royal Swedish Opera and French tenor Christian Papis, Bühler enriched his classical repertoire. He sang in the choir of the Dutch opera and performed in the Salzburg Festival under the direction of Claudio Abbado. Before joining Il Divo, he was mainly based in the Netherlands, singing oratorios and performing with the Netherlands Opera Gezelschap (NOG). Despite many performances, there are only a handful of recordings available of Bühler before Il Divo.

=== Il Divo ===
In December 2003, Bühler became a member of the international musical quartet Il Divo along with Carlos Marín (Spain), Sébastien Izambard (France), and David Miller (United States). He had an informal first audition with the group's creator, Simon Cowell. In Cowell's office, he simply asked Bühler to sing for him unaccompanied. Impressed by Bühler's tenor voice, Cowell offered him a place in Il Divo. Their first album, Il Divo, became a worldwide multi-platinum-selling record when released in November 2004, entering the US Billboard at number four and selling five million copies worldwide in less than a year and knocking Robbie Williams from the number one spot in the charts. Their second album, Ancora, was released in November 2005. Il Divo's third album, Siempre, was released in November 2006. Their fourth album, The Promise, was released in November 2008 and shot straight to number 1 in the UK.

== Discography ==
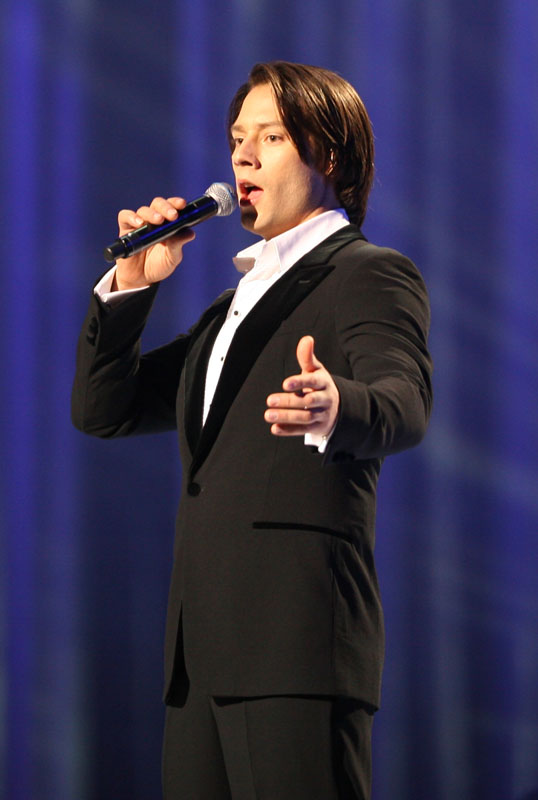
Bühler performing in 2008

=== The Conspiracy ===
- Studio album
1. 1991 – One to One

=== Il Divo ===
- Studio album
1. 2004 – Il Divo
2. 2005 – Ancora
3. 2006 – Siempre
4. 2008 – The Promise
5. 2011 – Wicked Game
6. 2013 – A Musical Affair
7. 2015 – Amor & Pasión
8. 2018 – Timeless
- Seasonal album
1. 2005 – The Christmas Collection
- Compilations
1. 2012 – The Greatest Hits
- Live albums
1. 2009 – An Evening with Il Divo: Live in Barcelona
2. 2014 – Live in Japan
- Special editions
1. 2005 – Il Divo. Gift Edition
2. 2006 – Il Divo Collezione
3. 2006 – Christmas Collection. The Yule Log
4. 2008 – The Promise. Luxury Edition
5. 2011 – Wicked Game. Gift Edition
6. 2011 – Wicked Game. Limited Edition Deluxe Box Set
7. 2012 – The Greatest Hits. Deluxe Limited Edition
8. 2014 – A Musical Affair. Exclusive
9. 2014 – A Musical Affair. French Version
10. 2014 – Live in Japan. Japan Versión

== Videography ==
=== Il Divo ===
1. 2004 – Live At Gotham Hall
2. 2005 – Encore
3. 2005 – Mamá
4. 2006 – The Yule Log: The Christmas Collection
5. 2006 – Live at the Greek Theater
6. 2008 – At the Coliseum
7. 2009 – An Evening with Il Divo: Live in Barcelona
8. 2011 – Live in London
9. 2014 – Live in Japan

== Performances ==
- Ba-ta-clan. Opera Minora. Festival Aan Zee in Noordwijk. 23 May 2001.
- Der Vogelhändler (plays leading role, Adam). Nieuwstad Operette in Nieuwegein. November 2002.
- Eine Nacht in Venedig (plays leading role, Caramello). Nieuwstad Operette in Nieuwegein. 7 November 2003.
- Johannes Passion. Oude Kerk, Delft. With Philharmonisch Koor Toonkunst Rotterdam. 17 April 2003.
