= Il Divo videography =

Il Divo discography
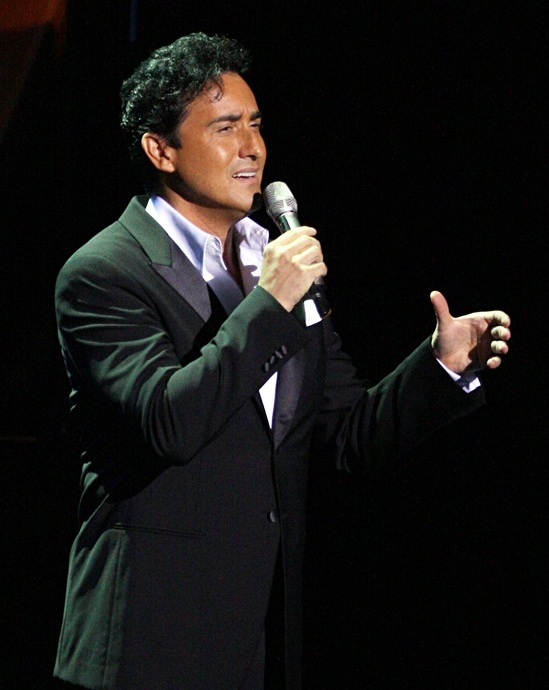
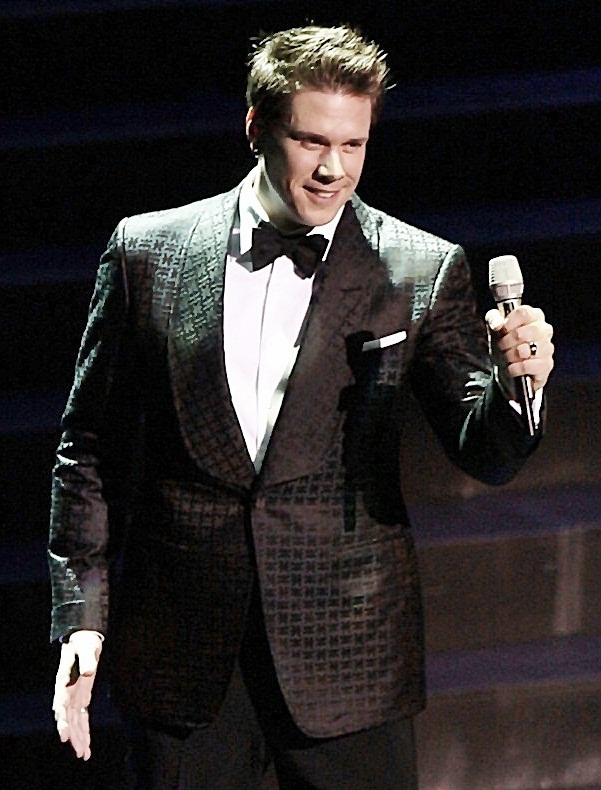
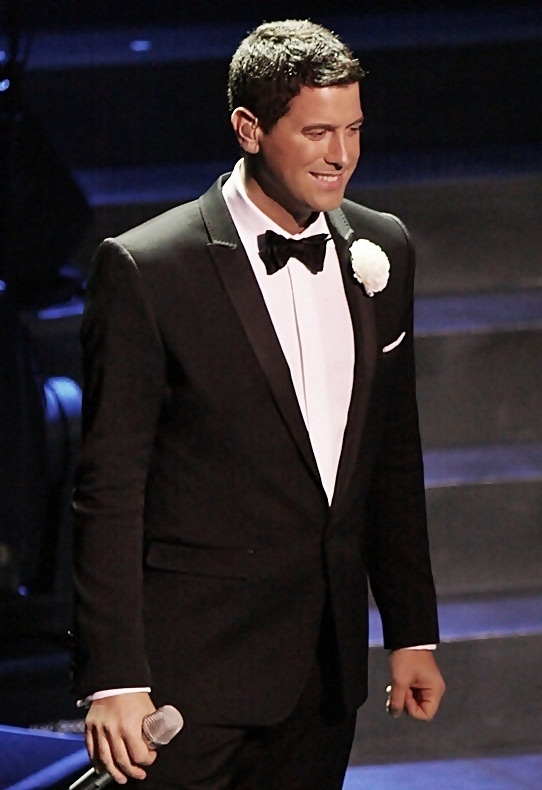
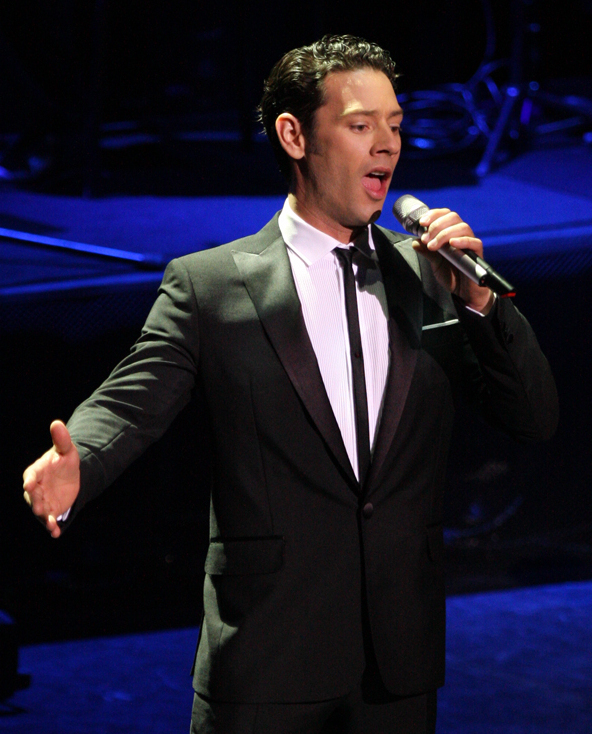
- Carlos Marín David Miller Sébastien Izambard Urs Bühler
- Video albums: 9
- Music videos: 9

The videography of Il Divo composes by the documentaries or concerts published in format DVD, Blu-ray or digital format, or by the videos musical officials, that have published by the discográficas associated to the quartet; Sony Music; Syco Music or Columbia Records.

Il Divo Is a grouping of singers of classical training, that tackles the popular repertoire and have transformed in an unprecedented success all over the world. The group is a vocal concept, based in the technical faculties of his singers, choosing a repertoire of the most varied, in style and period, that accompanies of an orchestra.

== Music videos ==
Year	Title	Album	Director	Recording	Video
2005	Regresa a mí	Il Divo	Sharon Maguirem	Filmed in Slovenia in 2004	Video
2005	Mama	Il Divo	Fátima Andrade	Filmed in Tropea, Italy in 2005	Video
2005	Time of our Lives	Voices from the FIFA World Cup	Nigel Dick	Filmed for the World-wide Glass of Football of 2006	Video
2014	Le Temps Des Cathédrales	A Musical Affair. French version		Filmed in Théâtre du Gymnase in Paris, France.	Vídeo
2014	Who Wants to Live Forever (with Anggun)	A Musical Affair. French version		Filmed in Théâtre du Gymnase in Paris, France.	Vídeo
2014	Aimer	A Musical Affair. French version		Filmed in Théâtre du Châtelet in Paris, France.	Vídeo
2014	Can You Feel the Love Tonight	A Musical Affair. French version		Filmed in Théâtre du Gymnase in Paris, France.	Vídeo
2014	Memory	A Musical Affair. French version		Filmed in Théâtre du Châtelet in Paris, France.	Vídeo
2015	Amor & Pasión -Trailer-	Amor & Pasión	CTT Exp & Rentals	Filmed in Tepoztlán, Mexico in July 2015	Vídeo

== Video albums: Documentary and concert ==
Year	Title	Presentation	Contained
2004	Live At Gotham Hall	*Digital; *DVD * Concert	*Place: Gottam Hall in New York; *Date: December 2004; *Promotional DVD. Live performance with tracks «Regresa a mí», «Mama», «Nella fantasia», «Passerà» y «My Way»
2005	Encore	* DVD; *Blu-ray * Concert	*Place: Roman Theatre (Mérida); *Date: 3 October 2005; *Extra: Interview, images of casting.
2005	Mama	* DVD * Documentary	*Videoclip de Mama. *Making-of of the video *Mamá - Live in New York; *Gallery of photos
2006	The Yule Log: The Christmas Collection	* DVD * Documentary	*Three sketch with Il Divo
2006	Live at the Greek Theater	* DVD; *Blu-ray * Concert	*Place:Greek Theatre of Los Angeles, California, California; *Date:22 June 2006; *Extra:Versión of Somewhere.
2008	At the Coliseum	* DVD; *Blu-ray * Concert	*Place:Coliseo Romano of Pula, in Croatia; *Date:April 2008; *Extra:Interview 'The Promise-Il Divo in Conversation'
2009	An Evening with Il Divo: Live in Barcelona	*CD; *DVD; *Blu-ray; *Concert	*Place:Palau Sant Jordi of Barcelona; *Date:3 April 2009; *Extra: unpublished Songs Bridge Over Troubled Water and The Impossible Dream. *Scenes behind cameras and interview with Il Divo
2011	Live in London	*DVD; *Blu-ray; *Concert	*Place:London Coliseum; *Date:1 August 2011; *Extra:Documentary recording Wicked Game and essays of the concert *Accompanied by the Orchestra Royal Philharmonic
2014	Live in Japan	*CD; *DVD; *Blu-ray; *Concert	*Place:Theatre Nippon Budokan of Tokyo; *Date:11 March 2014

== TV appearances ==
- It Takes Two (BBC 2 London 13 November 2015)
- ¡Qué tiempo tan feliz! (Telecinco Spain - 7 November 2015)
- Loose Women (ITV1 TV London 4 November 2015)
- QVC TV (London 3 November 2015)
- Music Industry Trusts Award (London 2 November 2015)
- Asaichi (NHK TV Japan 30 October 2015)
- Morning Market (Japan 30 October 2015)
- Despierta América (Miami 21 October 2015)
- Planet TV (Belgrade-2014)
- RTV (Slovenia-2014)
- The Talk (United States-2014)
- Which so happy time! (Spain-2013)
- America's Got Talent (United States-2013)
- Street Smart (2013)
- The Saturday Night Show (2013)
- The night in peace (Spain-2012)
- Which so happy time! (Spain-2012)
- RTL Klub (2012)
- Furusato (Japan-2012)
- Strictly Eats Dancing: It Takes Two (2012)
- Herman (Portugal-2011)
- To Hollywood Christmas Celebration at the Grove (2011)
- Today (2011)
- Daybreak (2011)
- Sortilegio (Soap opera) – (Mexico – 2009)
- Live with Kelly and Michael (2005–2008)
- Xposé (2008)
- Idol (2008)
- With the first to the 2007 (Spain-2007)
- Disk of the Year (Spain – 2006)
- Look who dances! (Spain – 2006)
- This Morning (2004–2006)
- Here there is tomato (Spain – 2006)
- Operation triumph (Spain – 2006)
- The Tonight Show with Jay Leno (2005–2006)
- Dancing with the Stars (2006)
- Fifa World Cup 2006 (Germany – 2006)
- Dancing with the Stars (Portugal-2006)
- Arucitys (2006)
- Good Morning America (2006)
- All-Time Greatest Party Songs (2005)
- Christmas Mania 2005 (2005)
- The Royal Variety Performance 2005 (2005)
- Wetten, dass..? (2005)
- The nocheBuena (Spain-2005)
- Top of the Pops (2005)
- Herman (Portugal-2005)
- UK Music Hall of Fame: Biggest Selling Artists of the 21st Century (2005)
- Dancing with the Stars (2005)
- Tickled Pink (2005)
- Symphonic show: Them stars chantent leurs idoles (2005)
- Ellen: The Ellen DeGeneres Show (United States-2005)
- The 32nd Annual Daytime Emmy Awards (2005)
- The View (2005)
- Each day (Spain-2005)
- Disk of the Year (Spain-2005)
- The Oprah Winfrey Show (United States – 2005)
- GMTV (2004-2005)
- Cilla Live (2004)
- The Late Late Show (2004)
- Today with Give and Mel (United States – 2004)
- Kelly (United States – 2004)

== See also ==
- Il Divo discography
