= List of number-one albums of 2006 (Spain) =

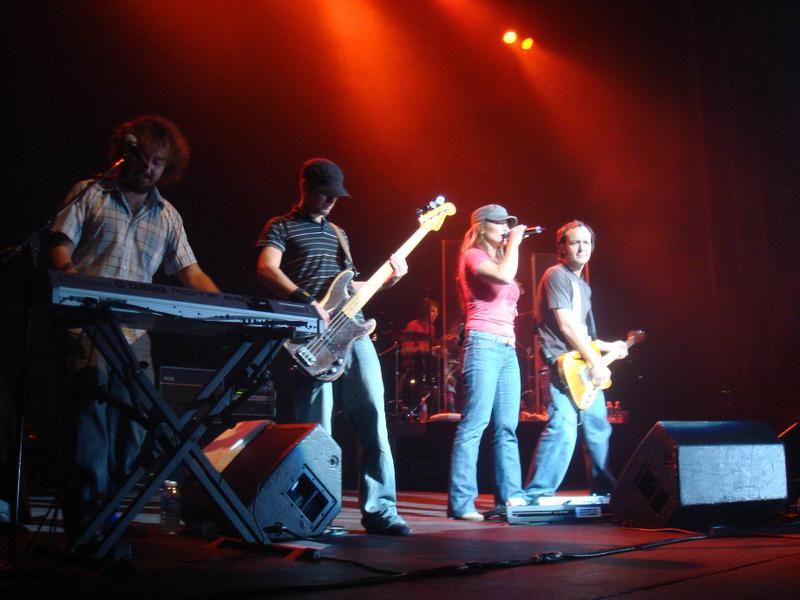
Spanish band La Oreja de Van Gogh stayed at number one for 11 non-consecutive weeks with their compilation album LOVG 1996-2006 and their fourth studio album, Guapa, the best-selling album of 2006 in Spain.

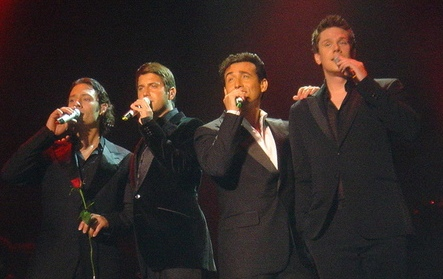
Multinational vocal group Il Divo peaked at number one with both Ancora and Siempre, their second and third studio albums respectively.

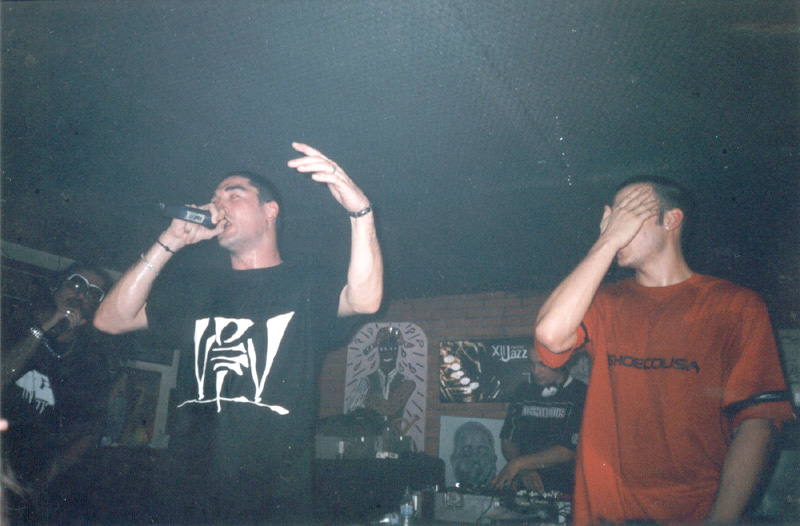
Spanish band Violadores del Verso became the first rap artist to reach number one in the Spanish charts with their studio album Vivir para Contarlo.

Top 100 España is a record chart published weekly by PROMUSICAE (Productores de Música de España), a non-profit organization composed by Spain and multinational record companies. This association tracks record sales (physical and digital) in Spain.

== Albums ==
Chart date	Album	Artist	Reference
January 8	Ancora	Il Divo	
January 15	Ancora	Il Divo	
January 22	1	The Beatles	
January 29	Ancora	Il Divo	
February 5	Sakya Tashi Ling	Monjes Budistas	
February 12	Se Ciega por Amor	Camela	
February 19	Se Ciega por Amor	Camela	
February 26	Se Ciega por Amor	Camela	
March 5	Joyas Prestadas	Niña Pastori	
March 12	Joyas Prestadas	Niña Pastori	
March 19	Joyas Prestadas	Niña Pastori	
March 26	El Disco de Rebelde Way	Erreway	
April 2	El Disco de Rebelde Way	Erreway	
April 9	LOVG 1996-2006	La Oreja de Van Gogh	
April 16	Joyas Prestadas	Niña Pastori	
April 23	Mô	Joan Manuel Serrat	
April 30	Guapa	La Oreja de Van Gogh	
May 7	Guapa	La Oreja de Van Gogh	
May 14	Guapa	La Oreja de Van Gogh	
May 21	Guapa	La Oreja de Van Gogh	
May 28	Guapa	La Oreja de Van Gogh	
June 4	Guapa	La Oreja de Van Gogh	
June 11	Guapa	La Oreja de Van Gogh	
June 18	Pentimiento	David Bustamante	
June 25	Guapa	La Oreja de Van Gogh	
July 2	Guapa	La Oreja de Van Gogh	
July 9	Pequeños Grandes Directos	El Canto del Loco	
July 16	Rebelde	RBD	
July 23	Rebelde	RBD	
July 30	Rebelde	RBD	
August 6	Rebelde	RBD	
August 13	Rebelde	RBD	
August 20	Rebelde	RBD	
August 27	Amar es Combatir	Maná	
September 3	Amar es Combatir	Maná	
September 10	Amar es Combatir	Maná	
September 17	Por la Boca Vive el Pez	Fito & Fitipaldis	
September 24	Por la Boca Vive el Pez	Fito & Fitipaldis	
October 1	Por la Boca Vive el Pez	Fito & Fitipaldis	
October 8	Premonición	David Bisbal	
October 15	Premonición	David Bisbal	
October 22	Premonición	David Bisbal	
October 29	Premonición	David Bisbal	
November 5	Vivir para Contarlo	Violadores del Verso	
November 12	El Tren de los Momentos	Alejandro Sanz	
November 19	El Tren de los Momentos	Alejandro Sanz	
November 26	El Tren de los Momentos	Alejandro Sanz	
December 3	El Tren de los Momentos	Alejandro Sanz	
December 10	Siempre	Il Divo	
December 17	Guapa	La Oreja de Van Gogh	
December 24	Siempre	Il Divo	
December 31	Siempre	Il Divo	

== See also ==
- List of number-one singles of 2006 (Spain)
