= Alberto Quintero (composer) =

Alberto Quintero (born in October 1970 in Palencia, Spain) is a Spanish composer, arranger, music producer, musical director and conductor.

== Biography ==
Although most of his career has been focused on recording, he has recently focused on the world of theatre, experiencing some success. This includes two nominations for the Max Awards of the Scenic Arts (2001–2002) as Best Musical Director, and for his work in My Fair Lady, the musical.

As his musical growth progressed, he made his first attempt as an arranger of musicals with Rock Quijote, the musical, in his home town of Palencia. Later, he moved to Madrid to further develop his skills. He studied piano with Ricard Miralles, harmony and arrangement with Felix Santos, singing with Maria Luisa Castellanos, and conducting with Miquel Ortega in Madrid and Antoni Ros-Marbà in Barcelona.

== Works ==
=== Records ===
Since 1992, he has taken part in many productions as an arranger, composer and producer. Among the artists with whom he has worked with are:

- Il Divo, (disc Timeless, 2018)
- Il Divo, (disc Amor & Pasión, 2015)
- Sébastien Izambard, Darren Hayes, Natalie Bassingthwaighte, Pete Murray, Ella Hooper, Diesel, David Campbell, Alex Lloyd, Christine Anu, Luke Steele, Katy Steele, Casey Donovan, Damien Leith, Marlisa, Nathaniel, The Australian Children's Choir, Flea (Hope For Isla & Jude, 2014)
- Il Divo, Vincent Niclo, Florent Pagny, Helene Segara, Natasha St-Pier, Anggun, Lisa Angell, Sonia Lacen (disc A Musical Affair French Edition, 2014)
- Il Divo (disc Live in Japan, 2014)
- Innocence (disc Live in México, 2014)
- Matina (disc Ven Conmigo, 2014)
- Il Divo, Juan Gabriel (song Amor Eterno, 2014)
- Il Divo, Lea Salonga (song A Whole New World, 2014)
- Il Divo, Lea Salonga (song Can You Feel The Love Tonight, 2013)
- Il Divo, Helene Fischer (song Can You Feel The Love Tonight, 2013)
- Il Divo, Engelbert Humperdick (song Spanish Eyes, 2013)
- Il Divo, Kristin Chenoweth, Heather Headley, Nicole Scherzinger (disc A Musical Affair, 2013)
- Innocence (disc This Is Love, 2013)
- Il Divo (disc The Greatest Hits, 2012)
- Ana Gabriel (disc Huelo a Soledad, 2001)
- Paloma San Basilio (disc Escorpio, 2001)
- Francisco (disc Mi reina, 1998)

=== Pianist ===
As a pianist, Quintero has collaborated with many acknowledged artists, including:

- Javier Gurruchaga and his Orquesta Mondragón
- Carlos Baute
- Cristina del Valle (Ex-Amistades Peligrosas) among others...

=== Theatre ===
From 1999, he has been an arranger, producer, music director and conductor of some successful musicals released in Gran Vía of Madrid, known as little Spanish Broadway. These include:

Grease (Lope de Vega Theater, 1999)
Leading roles: JG (Danny) and Geraldine Larrosa (Sandy), Carlos Marín (Vince Fontaine), Pablo Puyol (Kenickie), Marta Rivera (Rizzo), Victor Ullate (Sonny), Raquel Grijalba (Marty) and Ignasi Vidal (Doody).
Peter Pan (Lope de Vega & New Apolo Theaters, 1999 – 2000)
Leading roles: Raquel Grijalba (Peter), Carlos Marín (le Captain Hook & Mr. Darling), Virginia Martinez (Wendy Moira Angela Darling), Marta Rivera (Mrs. Darling) and Beatriz Luengo (Slightly).
La Magia de Broadway (Lara Theater, 1999)
Leading roles: Pablo Abraira, Mia Patterson, Pedro Ruy-Blas, Gema Castaño and Virginia Martinez.
La Magia de Broadway (Lara and New Apollo Theatres 2000)
Leading roles: Marta Sanchez, Serafín Zubiri, Carlos Marín, Geraldine Larrosa, Luis Amando, Paco Arrojo, Beatriz Luengo, Marta Rivera, Raquel Grijalba, Enrique Sequero and Nacho Vidal.
My Fair Lady (Theatre Coliseum, 2001 – 2003)
Leading roles: Paloma San Basilio (Eliza Doolitle), Jose Sacristán (Teacher Higgins), Joan Crosas (Alfred Doolitle), Nicolás Dueñas (Colonel Pickering), Victor Díaz (Freddy), Carmen Bernardos (Mrs. Higgings) and Selica Torcal (Mrs. Pearce).
Kerala (Aranjuez's Great Casino 2005)
musical mixture of Circus and Theatre ambient in the India and led for: Kris Horrigan and Christelle (acrobatic Duo).
Maribel y la extraña familia (Apollo Theater 2005)
Leading roles: Andoni Ferreño (Marcelino), Amparo Saizar (Maribel), Ester Bellver (Rufi), Raquel Grijalba (Nini), Chus Herranz (Pili), Selica Torcal (Paula) and Milagros Ponti (Matilde).

=== TV ===
Very recently, his career has focused mainly on television. As a composer, he has worked for several national, autonomic channels and new channels of TDT. Some standouts from his work on television are:

TV Programs
- El Juego del Euromillón (TV5MONDE)
- Club Disney (TV5MONDE)
- Escuela de Actores (Antena 3)
- Escuela de Cocina Telva (Veo TV)
- Formula Marca (Veo TV)
- Zapineox (Antena.neox)
- Zapinueb (IB3 Autonomic Television of Balearics)
- 4-4-2 (IB3 Autonomic Television of Balearics)
- Veo las Noticias (Veo TV)
- Muévete en Casa (Antena.nova)
- Joc i Gols (IB3 Autonomic Television of Balearics)
- Total Esports (IB3 Autonomic Television of Balearics)
- 7 de Notícies (IB3 Autonomic Television of Balearics)
- Parella de 3 (IB3 Autonomic Television of Balearics)
- Como el Perro y el Gato (Antena.neox)

Continuity
- Corporate music, Veo TV
- Corporate continuity, Veo TV
- Continuity Christmas 2005 (IB3 Autonomic Television of Balearics)
- Promos Spring 2006 (IB3 Autonomic Television of Balearics)
- Promos Summer 2006 (IB3 Autonomic Television of Balearics)
- Promos Autumn 2006 (IB3 Autonomic Television of Balearics)
- Promos Christmas and Winter 2006 (IB3 Autonomic Television of Balearics)
- Continuity Winter 2006–2007 (IB3 Autonomic Television of Balearics)

SitComs

- La Vida en el Aire (TVE2) (directed for Ignacio Mercero)
- La Virtud del Asesino (TVE1) (directed for Antonio Bodegas)

=== Films ===
As arranger, he also has done incursions into cinema's world and among his works:

- El Palomo Cojo (directed by Jaime de Armiñan)
- La Sal de la Vida (directed by Eugenio Martín)

=== Commercials ===
As composer of music for commercials he has also been employed by different agencies at campaigns for companies like:

- Disney
- Grupo Skoda
- Magneti Marelli

== Awards ==
1999 – Arranger and Musical Director of Peter Pan, the musical, rewarded with the Max Award of the Scenic Arts to the Best Children's Musical.

2001 – Nomination to the Max Award of Scenic Arts as Best Musical Director for My Fair Lady, the musical (Coliseum Theater, Madrid).

2002 – Nomination to the Max Award of Scenic Arts as Best Musical Director for My Fair Lady, the musical (Coliseum Theater, Madrid).
