= Live at Gotham Hall =

Live At Gotham Hall

Video by Il Divo
- Released: 2004
- Recorded: Gotham Hall, New York, of December 2004
- Genre: Classical crossover, melodic music; Romantic Music; Adult contemporary; folk music; sacred music.
- Label: Sony Music; Syco Music; Columbia Records

Il Divo chronology
Live At Gotham Hall (2004)	Encore (2006)

Live At Gotham Hall, is a live promotional presentation, available on DVD, of the concert of Il Divo in the Gotham Hall of New York, of December 2004.

It was the first concert of Il Divo, and the first DVD.

== Smart of songs ==
It contains a concert with five songs in direct;

No.	Title	Writer(s)	Length
1.	"Regresa a mí"	Diane Warren	5:01
2.	"Mama"	Savan Kotecha, Quiz & Larossi	3:19
3.	"Nella Fantasia"	Ennio Morricone, Chiara Ferrau	4:27
4.	"Passerà"	Aleandro Baldi, Giancarlo Bigazzi, Marco Falagiani	4:41
5.	"My Way"	Paul Anka, Jacques Revaux, Gilles Thibaut	4:29

== Personal ==
=== Voice ===
- Urs Bühler
- Sébastien Izambard
- Carlos Marín
- David Miller

== See also ==
- Il Divo discography
- Il Divo videography
