= Il Divo (disambiguation) =

Il Divo is a multinational operatic pop vocal group.

Il Divo may also refer to:

- Il Divo (album), a 2004 self-titled album by Il Divo
- Il divo (film), a 2008 Italian film
