= Alberto Quintero =

Alberto Quintero may refer to:

- Alberto Quintero (composer)
- Alberto Quintero (footballer)
