= Los Machucambos =

Music group of 1960s

Los Machucambos was a music band formed in Paris in 1959. The two guitar players were Rafael Gayoso (from Spain), Milton Zapata (from Peru) and the singer was Julia Cortés (from Costa Rica) . In 1960 Zapata was replaced by Romano Zanotti (from Italy). Although the group had a long list of discography their best known hit was Pepito which became the number 1 hit in 1961.

After Julia Cortés retired in 1972 they had various lead singers, like María Licata (1973-1980), Florence, María Aparecida (1976-1980), Chilean Mariana Montalvo (1980-2005) and Haileey since 2006.

== Discography ==
- Duerme Negrito 1959
- La Canción De Orfeo / Adieu Tristesse / La Bamba / Macongo 1959
- La Bamba 1960
- Chansons populaires d'Amérique du Sud 1960
- La Petenera / Piedra Y Camino / Recuerdos De Ipacarai / Chaparralito 1960
- Pepito / Negra Maria Esther / Dimelo En Septiembre / Luna De Benidorm 1960
- La Palomita 1961
- Pepito / Negra Maria Esther 1961
- La Cucaracha / Contigo en la Distancia / Otorrino Laringólogo / La Boa 1961
- Pepito / Dimelo En Septiembre 1961
- Pepito 1961
- Otorrino Laringologo Cha Cha Cha / La Boa Cha Cha Chacca 1961
- Aquella Rosa / Otorrino Laringologo 1961
- Non Monsieur / Fabulosa 1962
- Granada 1962
- Teresita La Chunga / Chico Cha Cha Cha 1962
- Granada Cha Cha Cha / Perfidia Cha Cha Cha 1962
- Cuando Calienta El Sol 1962
- Professor Bach / El Ascensor / Mira Mirame / La Chinqua 1963
- Non Monsieur / En El Lugar Del Mundo 1963
- La Mamma / Maria Elena / America / Melinda 1963
- Ciel de Lit / La Lune (Yo Soy la Luna) / La Bamba de Colas / Otra Bamba 11/1963 Decca 460.803
- Malaga / Mi Sono Innamorato Di Te 1963
- Los Machucambos 1963
- El Watusi 1963
- Los Indios 1963
- La Mamma / La Bamba De Colás / América / Mexicana 1964
- Mucho Machucambos 1964 Decca LP PFS4056 Phase 4 Stereo
- Cuando calienta el sol / Esperanza / Non monsieur (No señor) / Fabulosa 1964 Decca Edge 71774
- Tartamudeando / Angelito / La Pollera Colorá / Qui Quae Quo 1965
- Valsecito 1965
- Caramba! 1966
- Le Canard En Fer Blanc 1967
- Mucho gusto 1968
- Che 1970
- Pepito / Cuando Calienta El Sol 1970
- La Cumbia 1971
- El Condor Pasa 1971
- A Tonga Da Mironga Do Kabulete / Tarde Em Itapoan 1973
- Balas / Abre Alas 1975
- Maria Elena (Tuyo Et Mi Corazon) 1975
- Samba Tragique 1975
- Pepito / Solamente Una Vez 1976
- Cuando Calienta El Sol / Paseando Por La Sabana 1976
- Remember / Oda Del Desterrado 1977
- Donde Volabas 1979
- La Fiesta 1983
- Cuando Calienta El Sol 1976
- Pepito / Guantanamera 1988
- A Mover La Colita / Pepito 1996
- Vacances Tabou
- La Mamma / Tuyo Es Mi Corazon
- Song Of Orpheus / Goodbye Sadness
- La Cucaracha / Otorino Laringolo
- Cuando Calienta El Sol / La Bamba
- Garota De Ipanema
- Cuando Caliente El Sol
- Chico Cha Cha Cha / Amor Amor
- Bossa Nova
- Pepito / Adios
- Cha Cha Cha
- Os Bandeirantes
- La Cucaracha / La Bamba
- Non Monsieur (The Pink Poodle)

External videos
- Pepito
