= Isabel (Il Divo song) =

Single by Il Divo

from the album Ancora
- Released: November 7, 2005
- Recorded: Sweden, 2005
- Genre: classical crossover
- Length: 4:17
- Label: Syco Music, Sony Music
- Songwriter(s): Gabriel Fauré; Andreas Romdhane
- Producer(s): Andreas Romdhane

Isabel (Elisabeth) is a classical crossover song in Spanish adapted for the quartet Il Divo, included in their album Ancora (2005).

The melody is based and developed from "Pavane in F-sharp minor, Op. 50". Gabriel Fauré, 1887.

With lyrics by Andreas Romdhane, 2005.

The song commemorates the French countess Élisabeth Greffulhe.
