= Live in London (Il Divo) =

Video by Il Divo
- Released: 6 December 2011
- Recorded: 2 August 2011
- Genre: Classical crossover, melodic music; Romantic Music; Adult contemporary; folk music; sacred music;
- Label: Sony Music; Syco Music; Columbia Records

Il Divo chronology
An Evening with Il Divo: Live in Barcelona (2009)	Live in London (2011)	Live in Japan (2014)

Live in London is a home video of the concert of the English group of crossover classical Il Divo in London Coliseum, of London on 2 August 2011, accompanied by the London Philharmonic Orchestra. Published on 5 December 2011 in format DVD or Blu-ray.

The concert of 120 minutes exhibits mostly material of the album Wicked Game. 'Live in London' also has a documentary behind that follows to Seb, Urs, David and Carlos during the recording and promotion of "Wicked Game".

== Concert ==
Live in London – Concert DVD
No.	Title	Writer(s)	Length
1.	"Te Amaré" (Come What May)	David Baerwald, Kevin Gilbert	4:56
2.	"Dov'è L'Amore"	Samuel Barber	3:26
3.	"Adagio"	Tomaso Albinoni	4:37
4.	"Nella Fantasia"	Chiara Ferrau, Ennio Morricone	4:26
5.	"La Vida Sin Amor"	Gómez, David Kreuger, Per Magnusson	3:39
6.	"Everytime I Look at You"	Andy Hill, John Robinson Reid	3:48
7.	"Passerà"	Aleandro Baldi, Giancarlo Bigazzi, Marco Falagiani	4:41
8.	"Senza Catene" (Unchained Melody)	Alex North, Hy Zaret	3:51
9.	"A mi manera" (My Way)	Paul Anka, Jacques Revaux, Gilles Thibaut	4:28
10.	"Melanconia" (Wicked Game)	Chris Isaak	4:15
11.	"Si tú me amas"	Andreas Romdhane, Josef Larossi, John Robinson Reid	4:08
12.	"Mama"	Savan Kotecha, Andreas Romdhane	3:18
13.	"Aleluya" (Hallelujah)	Leonard Cohen	3:21
14.	"Llorando" (Crying)	Joe Melson, Roy Orbison	3:24
15.	"Regresa a mí" (Un-Break My Heart)	Diane Warren, Marco Flores	4:42
16.	"Desde el día que te fuiste" (Without You)	Peter Ham, Tom Evans	3:51
17.	"Pour que tu m'aimes encore" (Don't Let the Sun Go Down on Me)	Elton John, Bernie Taupin	5:53
18.	"Somewhere"	Leonard Bernstein, Stephen Sondheim	3:30
19.	"Con te partirò" (Time to Say Goodbye)	Frank Peterson, Lucio Quarantotto, Francesco Sartori	4:19

- Extra
1. Countdown to the Coliseum
2. At The Classic Brits
3. At The Photoshoot
4. In The Studio
5. At The Coliseum
6. Wicked Game – Track By Track
7. Wicked Game – Tráiler

== Personal ==
=== Voice ===
- Urs Bühler
- Sébastien Izambard
- Carlos Marín
- David Miller

== Certifications ==
Region	Certification	Certified units/sales
Australia (ARIA)	Platinum	15,000^{^}
^{^} Shipments figures based on certification alone.
