= Timeless (Il Divo album) =

Studio album by Il Divo
- Released: 10 August 2018
- Recorded: 2017
- Length: 38:22
- Label: Decca Gold
- Producer: Alberto Quintero

Singles from Timeless
- 1. "Hola" Released: 11 May 2018; 2. "Aquí Esperándote" Released: 27 July 2018; 3. "Unforgettable" Released: 3 August 2018

Timeless is the ninth studio album by the classical crossover group Il Divo. It was released on 10 August 2018 by Decca Gold. The album is Il Divo's first with Universal Music. The album's first single, "Hola" (a Spanish-language version of "Hello" by Adele), was released on 11 May 2018.

== Track listing ==
Timeless track listing
No.	Title	Writer(s)	Length
1.	"Hola"	Adele, Greg Kurstin	4:50
2.	"All of Me"	David Tozer, Toby Gad, John Legend.	4:54
3.	"Angels"	Robbie Williams, Guy Chambers	3:59
4.	"Aquí Esperándote"	Richard Marx, José Feliciano, Leonardo Schultz	4:04
5.	"Toi Et Moi"	Alan Bergman, Marilyn Bergman, Marvin Hamlisch	3:54
6.	"Grazie Amore Mio"	Carl Sigman, Francis Lai	4:08
7.	"Que Bonito Es Vivir"	George Douglas, George David Weiss	2:31
8.	"Love Me Tender"	Elvis Presley, Vera Matson	3:14
9.	"Unforgettable"	Irving Gordon	3:23
10.	"Smile"	Geoffrey Parsons, Charlie Chaplin, John Turner	3:25
Total length:			38:22

== Charts ==
Chart performance for Timeless
Chart (2018)	Peak position
Australian Albums (ARIA)	37
Austrian Albums (Ö3 Austria)	50
Belgian Albums (Ultratop Flanders)	5
Belgian Albums (Ultratop Wallonia)	88
Czech Albums (ČNS IFPI)	29
Dutch Albums (Album Top 100)	17
German Albums (Offizielle Top 100)	76
Polish Albums (ZPAV)	50
Scottish Albums (OCC)	9
Spanish Albums (PROMUSICAE)	3
Swiss Albums (Schweizer Hitparade)	7
UK Albums (OCC)	13
