= Ignasi Vidal =

Spanish painter and illustrator

Ignasi Vidal i Molné (1904–1988) was a Spanish painter and illustrator.

Born in Barcelona, the son of the writer Cosme Vidal i Rosich (known as "Josep Aladern"), in 1939 Vidal immigrated to Monaco because of the Spanish Civil War. He was vice-president of the UNESCO Comite d'Arts Plastiques for Monaco. He illustrated Baudelaire, Verlaine, Arthur Rimbaud and many others.

Vidal died in Nice.
