= Amor & Pasión =

Studio album by Il Divo
- Released: 28 October 2015
- Recorded: February – September 2015
- Studios: Miami Art House Studios (Miami, United States)
- Genres: Classical crossover; bolero; mambo; tango
- Length: 43:06
- Labels: Syco; Sony Music
- Producer: Julio Reyes Copello

Il Divo chronology
A Musical Affair (2013)	Amor & Pasión (2015)	Timeless (2018)

Amor & Pasión, initially released in Japan on 28 October 2015, is the eighth studio album by the classical crossover musical group Il Divo, formed by a male vocal quartet; the Swiss tenor Urs Bühler, the Spanish baritone Carlos Marín, the American tenor David Miller and the French pop singer Sébastien Izambard. The album was produced by Julio Reyes Copello.

== Release ==
The album was released across the globe in a one month period. The album was first released in Japan on 28 October 2015, in Spain on 6 November, in the United States on 13 November, and in the UK on 27 November, on Syco Music under Sony Music and on Columbia Records their final album for Sony.

== Recording ==
The album was recorded at the Miami Art House Studios, in the city of Miami, in 2015. During the month of July 2015, initiated the photographic campaign for his seventh album and the recording of a new videoclip in the streets of the city of Tepoztlán, in Mexico, under the production of CTT Exp & Rentals.

== Tracks ==
The album contains versions of songs in traditional tango, mambo and classical bolero, with flavours and sensual rhythms of Spain, Cuba, Argentina and Mexico. It marked a new chapter in the group's career.

The album contains songs only in Spanish, with versions of "Por una cabeza" originally by Carlos Gardel and Alfredo Le Pera, "Abrázame" by Julio Iglesias and Rafael Ferro Garcia, "Si voy a perderte (Don't Wanna Lose You)" by Gloria Estefan, "Eres tú", "Quizás, quizás, quizás (Perhaps, Perhaps, Perhaps)" of the composer Osvaldo Farrés, "Bésame Mucho" of the composer Consuelo Velázquez, "¿Quien Será? (Sway)" mambo composed by Pablo Beltrán Ruiz and Luis Demetrio, "Volver" tango of Carlos Gardel, the bolero "Historia de un amor", the bolero "Contigo en la distancia" of César Portillo de la Luz, "A las mujeres que amé (To All the Girls I've Loved Before)" by Hal David and Albert Hammond and their version of "Himno de la alegría (Ode to Joy)".

== Singles ==
- "Por una cabeza"
- "Si voy a perderte (Don't wanna lose you)"
- "Bésame mucho"
- "Abrázame"
- "Quizás, quizás, quizás"

== Track listing ==
Amor & Pasión
No.	Title	Writer(s)	Length
1.	"Por una Cabeza"	Carlos Gardel; Alfredo Le Pera	3:44
2.	"Abrázame"	Julio Iglesias; Rafael Ferro Garcia	3:27
3.	"Si voy a perderte (Don't Wanna Lose You)"	Gloria Estefan	4:47
4.	"Quizás, quizás, quizás (Perhaps, Perhaps, Perhaps)"	Osvaldo Farrés	3:14
5.	"Bésame mucho"	Consuelo Velázquez	2:50
6.	"¿Quien será? (Sway)"	Pablo Beltrán Ruiz; Luis Demetrio	3:01
7.	"Volver"	Carlos Gardel	3:12
8.	"Historia de un amor"	Carlos Eleta Almarán	3:29
9.	"Eres tú"	Juan Carlos Calderón	4:04
10.	"Contigo en la distancia"	César Portillo de la Luz	2:51
11.	"A las mujeres que amé (To All the Girls I've Loved Before)"	Hal David; Albert Hammond	4:32
12.	"Himno de la alegría (Ode to Joy)"	Ludwig van Beethoven; Amado Regueiro Rodríguez; Osvaldo Nicolás Ferraro Gutierrez	3:43

== Personnel ==
Il Divo

- Carlos Marín – baritone
- Sébastien Izambard – tenor
- David Miller – tenor
- Urs Bühler – tenor

Production

- Julio Reyes Copello – producer, mixing, engineer
- Alberto Quintero – mixing
- Maria Elisa Ayerbe – engineer, mixing
- Jan Holzer, Vitek Kral, Andrés Bermúdez, Gabriel Saientz Bandoneón, Carlos Fernando López, David Alsina, Ricardo López Lalinde – engineer
- Dick Beetham – mastering

Other musicians

- Dan Warner – Guitar
- Guillermo Vadalá – bass
- Julio Reyes Copello – piano, programmer, arrangement
- Richard Bravo – percussion
- David Alsina - Bandoneon
- Juan Camilo Arboleda – orchestral arrangements
- Carlos Fernando López – orchestral arrangements, programmer
- Ricardo López Lalinde – programmer

== Charts ==
=== Weekly charts ===
Chart (2015–16)	Peak position
Australian Albums (ARIA)	80
Austrian Albums (Ö3 Austria)	43
Belgian Albums (Ultratop Flanders)	13
Belgian Albums (Ultratop Wallonia)	53
Dutch Albums (Album Top 100)	6
Irish Albums (IRMA)	25
Polish Albums (ZPAV)	38
Portuguese Albums (AFP)	11
Spanish Albums (Promusicae)	10
Swiss Albums (Schweizer Hitparade)	22
UK Albums (Official Charts)	13
US Billboard 200	135
US Top Latin Albums (Billboard)	1
US Latin Pop Albums (Billboard)	1

=== Year-end charts ===
Chart (2015)	Position
Dutch Albums (Album Top 100)	65
Spanish Albums (PROMUSICAE)	59
UK Albums (OCC)	96
Chart (2016)	Position
Belgian Albums (Ultratop Flanders)	185
Spanish Albums (PROMUSICAE)	72
US Top Latin Albums (Billboard)	5

== Certifications ==
Region	Certification	Certified units/sales
Spain (Promusicae)	Gold	20,000^{‡}
United Kingdom (BPI)	Silver	60,000^{*}
^{*} Sales figures based on certification alone.^{‡} Sales+streaming figures based on certification alone.

== See also ==
- List of number-one Billboard Latin Albums from the 2010s
- List of number-one Billboard Latin Pop Albums from the 2010s
