= A Musical Affair =

Studio album by Il Divo
- Released: 5 November 2013
- Recorded: February – September 2013
- Genre: Classical crossover
- Length: 45:43
- Label: Syco, Columbia
- Producer: Steve Mac

Il Divo chronology
Wicked Game (2011)	A Musical Affair (2013)	Amor & Pasión (2015)

A Musical Affair is the seventh studio album by the classical crossover group Il Divo. Il Divo is a group of four male singers: French pop singer Sébastien Izambard, Spanish baritone Carlos Marín, American tenor David Miller, and Swiss tenor Urs Bühler. The album was released on 5 November 2013, and has the participation of singers such as Barbra Streisand, Nicole Scherzinger, Kristin Chenoweth and Michael Ball, among others.

The album's songs are compiled from famous plays and musicals including The Lion King, The Phantom of the Opera, Les Misérables, West Side Story and Cats, among others.

The French version of the album A Musical Affair which was published on 24 November 2014, includes duets with French singers; the songs are sung partially or entirely in French.

== Recording ==
The album, produced by Steve Mac, was recorded between Florida, London, Belgium, New York, California, Barcelona, Washington DC and Slovakia in the recording studios of:

- Bank Atlantic Center in Fort Lauderdale, Florida
- Britannia Row Studios in London, England
- ICP Studios in Brussels, Belgium
- Madison Square Garden in New York
- NightBird Recording Studios in West Hollywood
- SARM Studios in London, England
- Feel Studies of Barcelona, Spain
- Studio 2 of Slovak Radio in Bratislava, Slovakia
- Tonopro Studios in Barcelona, Spain
- Verizon Center in Washington DC, United States

== Track listing ==
=== International ===
No.	Title	Writer(s)	Length
1.	"Memory" (musical Cats duet with Nicole Scherzinger)	Andrew Lloyd Webber	4:28
2.	"Can You Feel the Love Tonight?" (musical The Lion King duet with Heather Headley)	Elton John, Tim Rice	4:08
3.	"Bring Him Home" (musical Les Misérables)	Alain Boublil and Jean-Marc Natel	3:25
4.	"Tonight" (musical West Side Story)	Leonard Bernstein, Stephen Sondheim, lyricist	2:50
5.	"All I Ask of You" (musical The Phantom of the Opera duet with Kristin Chenoweth)	Andrew Lloyd Webber, Charles Hart, Richard Stilgoe	4:29
6.	"Some Enchanted Evening" (musical South Pacific)	Richard Rodgers, Oscar Hammerstein II	3:15
7.	"Who Can I Turn To?" (musical The Roar of the Greasepaint – The Smell of the Crowd)	Leslie Bricusse, Anthony Newley	3:28
8.	"Who Wants to Live Forever" (musical We Will Rock You)	Brian May	3:36
9.	"You'll Never Walk Alone" (musical Carousel)	Richard Rodgers, Oscar Hammerstein II	3:39
10.	"If Ever I Would Leave You" (musical Camelot)	Alan Jay Lerner, Frederick Loewe	3:03
11.	"Love Changes Everything" (musical Aspects of Love duet with Michael Ball)	Andrew Lloyd Webber	3:48
12.	"The Music of the Night" (musical The Phantom of the Opera duet with Barbra Streisand)	Andrew Lloyd Webber	4:17

=== French version ===
No.	Title	Writer(s)	Length
1.	"Belle" (with Florent Pagny, from Notre-Dame de Paris)	Luc Plamondon, Riccardo Cocciante	4:39
2.	"Le Temps Des Cathédrales" (with Vincent Niclo, from Notre-Dame de Paris)	Luc Plamondon, Riccardo Cocciante	3:17
3.	"Memory" (duet with Hélène Ségara from musical Cats)	Andrew Lloyd Webber	4:23
4.	"Can You Feel the Love Tonight" (duet with Lisa Angell, from musical The Lion King)	Elton John, Tim Rice	4:04
5.	"Who Wants to Live Forever" (duet with Anggun, from musical We Will Rock You)	Brian May	4:33
6.	"Aimer" (duet with Natasha St-Pier, from musical Roméo et Juliette, de la haine à l'amour)	Gérard Presgurvic	2:49
7.	"L'envie d'aimer" (duet with Sonia Lacen, from musical Les Dix Commandements)	Daniel Lévi	5:14

== Charts ==
=== Weekly charts ===
Chart (2013)	Peak position
Australian Albums (ARIA)	40
Austrian Albums (Ö3 Austria)	16
Belgian Albums (Ultratop Flanders)	11
Belgian Albums (Ultratop Wallonia)	31
Dutch Albums (Album Top 100)	6
Finnish Albums (Suomen virallinen lista)	47
French Albums (SNEP)	42
German Albums (Offizielle Top 100)	64
Irish Albums (IRMA)	21
New Zealand Albums (RMNZ)	15
Portuguese Albums (AFP)	7
Scottish Albums (OCC)	6
Spanish Albums (PROMUSICAE)	12
Swiss Albums (Schweizer Hitparade)	24
UK Albums (OCC)	5
US Billboard 200	19
US Top Classical Albums (Billboard)	1

=== Year-end charts ===
Chart (2013)	Position
Belgian Albums (Ultratop Flanders)	113
Dutch Albums (Album Top 100)	56
UK Albums (OCC)	69
US Top Classical Albums (Billboard)	21

Chart (2014)	Position
Belgian Albums (Ultratop Flanders)	136
Belgian Albums (Ultratop Wallonia)	153
US Top Classical Albums (Billboard)	6

Chart (2015)	Position
Belgian Albums (Ultratop Wallonia)	175

== Certifications ==
Region	Certification	Certified units/sales
France (SNEP)	Gold	50,000^{*}
Poland (ZPAV)	Gold	10,000^{*}
United Kingdom (BPI)	Gold	100,000^{^}
^{*} Sales figures based on certification alone.^{^} Shipments figures based on certification alone.
