= The Christmas Collection (Il Divo album) =

Studio album by Il Divo
- Released: 25 October 2005
- Genre: Classical crossover
- Labels: Syco; Columbia

Il Divo chronology
Il Divo (2004)	The Christmas Collection (2005)	Ancora (2005)

The Christmas Collection is the second studio album by the classical crossover vocal group Il Divo. The album is a collection of Christmas or holiday-inspired songs. It was released on 25 October 2005 in seven countries: the United States, Canada, Austria, Slovenia, the Netherlands, Sweden and Finland.

The Christmas Collection was also the best-selling holiday album of 2005 in the United States according to sales figures from Nielsen/SoundScan, with total sales of 544,000 copies that year.

On 8 January 2007, The Christmas Collection was certified Platinum by the Recording Industry Association of America for shipments of one million copies in the United States.

== Track listing ==
1. "O Holy Night"
2. "White Christmas"
3. "Ave Maria"
4. "When a Child Is Born"
5. "Adeste Fideles (O Come All Ye Faithful)"
6. "Over the Rainbow"
7. "Panis Angelicus"
8. "Rejoice"
9. "Silent Night"
10. "The Lord's Prayer"

== Charts ==
=== Weekly charts ===
Weekly chart performance for The Christmas Collection
Chart (2005–2007)	Peak position
Australian Albums (ARIA)	16
Austrian Albums (Ö3 Austria)	18
Belgian Albums (Ultratop Flanders)	49
Belgian Albums (Ultratop Wallonia)	59
Canadian Albums (Billboard)	1
Danish Albums (Hitlisten)	12
Dutch Albums (Album Top 100)	4
Finnish Albums (Suomen virallinen lista)	11
French Albums (SNEP)	122
German Albums (Offizielle Top 100)	75
Hungarian Albums (MAHASZ)	31
Mexican Albums (AMPROFON)	80
New Zealand Albums (RMNZ)	24
Portuguese Albums (AFP)	2
Spanish Albums (Promusicae)	19
Swedish Albums (Sverigetopplistan)	4
Swiss Albums (Schweizer Hitparade)	13
US Billboard 200	14
US Top Classical Albums (Billboard)	1
US Top Holiday Albums (Billboard)	1

=== Year-end charts ===
Year-end chart performance for The Christmas Collection
Chart (2006)	Position
US Billboard 200	137

== Certifications ==
Certifications for The Christmas Collection
Region	Certification	Certified units/sales
Australia (ARIA)	Gold	35,000^{^}
Canada (Music Canada)	2× Platinum	200,000^{^}
Mexico (AMPROFON)	Gold	50,000^{^}
Portugal (AFP)	Platinum	20,000^{^}
Switzerland (IFPI Switzerland)	Gold	20,000^{^}
United Kingdom (BPI)	Gold	100,000^{‡}
United States (RIAA)	Platinum	1,000,000^{^}
^{^} Shipments figures based on certification alone.^{‡} Sales+streaming figures based on certification alone.

== See also ==
- List of Billboard Top Holiday Albums number ones of the 2000s
