= An Evening with Il Divo: Live in Barcelona =

Live album by Il Divo
- Released: 1 December 2009
- Recorded: 3 April 2009
- Venue: Barcelona, Spain
- Genre: Classical crossover
- Label: Sony; Syco; Columbia

Il Divo chronology
An Evening with Il Divo: Live in Barcelona (2009)	Live in Japan (2014)

An Evening with Il Divo: Live in Barcelona

Video by Il Divo
- Released: 1 December 2009
- Recorded: 3 April 2009
- Venue: Barcelona, Spain
- Genre: Classical crossover
- Label: Sony; Syco; Columbia

Il Divo chronology
At the Coliseum (2008)	An Evening with Il Divo: Live in Barcelona (2009)	Live in London (2011)

An Evening with Il Divo: Live in Barcelona is the first live album by classical crossover vocal group Il Divo. It was recorded at the Palau Sant Jordi concert An Evening with Il Divo: Live in Barcelona. on 3 April 2009 and the album was released 1 December the same year. It was made available in both Blu-ray and DVDs + CD format.

== Overview ==
The live album mostly covers material from their prior studio albums but also includes two new songs in the quartet's repertoire. "Bridge over Troubled Water", by Simon & Garfunkel, and "The Impossible Dream" from the Broadway musical Man of La Mancha. It contains songs interpreted mainly in English and Spanish, and the DVD includes behind the scenes and an interview with the group. It was directed by Guillermo Baker. Giorgio Armani designed the wardrobe of Carlos Marín, David Miller, Sebastien Izambard and Urs Buhler for this concert.

It debuted at No.1 in nine countries, including Spain,
Portugal and the Netherlands and was certified Gold in Mexico.

== Track listing ==
=== DVD ===
DVD An Evening with Il Divo: Live in Barcelona
No.	Title	Writer(s)	Length
1.	"Somewhere"	Leonard Bernstein, Stephen Sondheim
2.	"Regresa a mí"	Diane Warren
3.	"La Promessa"	Jörgen Elofsson, Francesco Galtieri
4.	"Angelina"	Alcaraz Gomez, Gordeno, Larossi
5.	"Isabel"	Andreas Romdhane, Gabriel Fauré
6.	"Bridge over Troubled Water"	Paul Simon
7.	"She"	Charles Aznavour, Herbert Kretzmer
8.	"Passerà"	Aleandro Baldi, Giancarlo Bigazzi, Marco Falagiani
9.	"Unchained Melody Senza Catene"	Alex North, Hy Zaret
10.	"Mamá"	Larossi, Savan
11.	"Nights in White Satin Notte di Luce"	Mario Frangoulis, Justin Hayward
12.	"The Winner Takes It All Va toda al ganador"	Benny Andersson, Björn Ulvaeus
13.	"Without You Desde el día que te fuiste"	Thomas Evans, Peter Ham
14.	"Pour que tu m'aimes encore"	Jean-Jacques Goldman
15.	"Everytime I Look at You"	Andy Hill, John Reid
16.	"Hallelujah"	Leonard Cohen
17.	"Adagio"	Tomaso Albinoni, Remo Giazotto
18.	"La Vida Sin Amor"	Alcaraz Gomez, David Kreuger, Per Magnusson, Pablo Pinilla, Matteo Saggese
19.	"Caruso"	Lucio Dalla
20.	"The Power of Love La Fuerza Mayor"	Peter Gill, Holly Johnson, Brian Nash, Mark O'Toole, Rudy Pérez
21.	"My Way A Mi Manera"	Paul Anka, Revaux, Thibault
22.	"Amazing Grace"	Dave Arch, Urs Bühler, Sebastian Izambard, Carlos Marin, Tradizionale
23.	"The Impossible Dream (The Quest)"	Joe Darion, Mitch Leigh

=== CD ===
CD An Evening with Il Divo: Live in Barcelona
No.	Title	Writer(s)	Length
1.	"Regresa a mí"	Diane Warren	5:01
2.	"Unchained Melody Senza Catene"	Alex North, Hy Zaret	3:41
3.	"La Promessa"	Jörgen Elofsson, Francesco Galtieri	4:54
4.	"Adagio"	Tomaso Albinoni, Remo Giazotto	4:46
5.	"Somewhere"	Leonard Bernstein, Stephen Sondheim	3:28
6.	"Nights in White Satin Notte di Luce"	Mario Frangoulis, Justin Hayward	4:35
7.	"Without You Desde el día que te fuiste"	Thomas Evans, Peter Ham	3:39
8.	"Hallelujah"	Leonard Cohen	3:18
9.	"Amazing Grace"	Dave Arch, Urs Bühler, Sebastian Izambard, Carlos Marin, Tradizionale	3:57
10.	"My Way A Mi Manera"	Paul Anka, Revaux, Thibault	4:29

== Certifications ==
Region	Certification	Certified units/sales
Australia (ARIA)	4× Platinum	60,000^{^}
Mexico (AMPROFON) album	Gold	30,000^{^}
Portugal (AFP) album	Gold	10,000^{^}
Spain (Promusicae) album	Gold	30,000^{^}
United Kingdom (BPI) video	Platinum	50,000^{^}
^{^} Shipments figures based on certification alone.

== See also ==
- Il Divo Videography
- Il Divo discography
