= The Promise (Il Divo album) =

Album by Il Divo

Studio album by Il Divo
- Released: 10 November 2008
- Genre: Classical crossover
- Labels: Syco, Columbia
- Producer: Steve Mac

Il Divo chronology
Siempre (2006)	The Promise (2008)	Wicked Game (2011)

The Promise is the fifth studio album by the classical crossover group, Il Divo. The Promise was released globally on 10 November 2008, except in the US and Canada, where it was released 17 November, Ireland and Mexico where it was released on 7 November, and Japan, on 26 November. The album reached the No.1 spot in the UK on 16 November. The album was produced by Steve Mac. It was announced on 10 September, that it will be named The Promise, although the track listing was at this time not yet disclosed. In early messages to people who are members of the band's official site's mailing list, it revealed to them that 'Il Divo return with their richest and most diverse album to date.' It also revealed that the album would have twelve songs. Cover songs confirmed at this time were: Frankie Goes To Hollywood's "The Power of Love"; 'a haunting and beautiful interpretation of Leonard Cohen's "Hallelujah"'; the smouldering intensity of Lara Fabian's "Adagio"; and the fourth confirmed song then was ABBA's "The Winner Takes It All".

The Promise contains seven covers of existing songs, along with four new songs written especially for the album. The new songs included are: "La Promessa" (Italian), "Enamorado" (Spanish), "Angelina" (Spanish) and "La Luna" (Italian). Also contained on the album is a cover of the chart topping song "She" made famous by French tenor Charles Aznavour. "L'Alba Del Mondo" is an Italian adaptation of the song "I Knew I Loved You", a famous song based on "Deborah's Theme" from Once Upon A Time in America and written by Ennio Morricone. The final track on the album is a cover of the traditional hymn, "Amazing Grace".

On 24 October 2008, Il Divo flew across the ocean overnight specially for The Oprah Winfrey Show after they had been called by Winfrey on the phone on their way in the airport for a post-album recording vacation, to give a special performance on the show, where they performed the song "Amazing Grace". Following this the hymn made it into the MTV US top 20.

The album peaked No. 1 on the top classical albums on Billboard charts, and up until 12 September 2009, spent 43 straight weeks in the Top 10 list.

The album was released globally on 10 November 2008, except in the US and Canada, where it was released on 18 November 2008, Ireland where it was released on 7 November 2008, and Japan, on 26 November 2008. The album reached the No.1 spot in the UK on 16 November 2008. The album was produced by Steve Mac. According to the credits on the DVDs, the bagpipes in Amazing Grace, both on this album and in the performance on the In the Coliseum DVD, are played by Robert White.

== Track listing ==
The Promise
No.	Title	Writer(s)	Length
1.	"La fuerza mayor" (The Power of Love)	Holly Johnson, Peter Gill, Mark O'Toole, Brian Nash, Rudy Pérez	5:01
2.	"La Promessa"	Jörgen Elofsson, Francesco Galtieri	4:28
3.	"Adagio"	Remo Giazotto, Lara Fabian	4:37
4.	"Hallelujah" (Aleluya)	Leonard Cohen	3:21
5.	"L'alba del mondo" (I Knew I Loved You (Deborah's Theme))	Ennio Morricone	4:47
6.	"Enamorado"	Andreas Romdhane y Josef Larossi, Armando Manzanero, John Reid	3:15
7.	"Angelina"	Alcarez Gómez, Gordeno, Andreas Romdhane y Josef Larossi	4:32
8.	"Va todo al ganador" (The Winner Takes It All)	Benny Andersson, Björn Ulvaeus	3:48
9.	"La luna"	Kinnda Hamid, Marco Marinangeli, Andreas Romdhane, Josef Larossi	3:51
10.	"She"	Charles Aznavour, Herbert Kretzmer	2:51
11.	"Amazing Grace"	John Newton	4:30
Total length:			45:01

The Promise (Japan Edition)
No.	Title	Writer(s)	Length
12.	"Por ti vuelvo a nacer" (With You I'm Born Again)	Carol Connors, David Condado	3:39

The Promise (Mexican Edition)
No.	Title	Writer(s)	Length
12.	"Sortilegio De Amor"	Josef Larossi, Denisse De Kalaffe	3:26

== Charts ==
=== Weekly charts ===
Chart (2008)	Peak position
Australian Albums (ARIA)	5
Austrian Albums (Ö3 Austria)	11
Belgian Albums (Ultratop Flanders)	1
Belgian Albums (Ultratop Wallonia)	18
Canadian Albums (Billboard)	2
Danish Albums (Hitlisten)	11
Dutch Albums (Album Top 100)	1
Finnish Albums (Suomen virallinen lista)	5
French Albums (SNEP)	22
German Albums (Offizielle Top 100)	24
Hungarian Albums (MAHASZ)	28
Irish Albums (IRMA)	2
Italian Albums (FIMI)	65
Mexican Albums (AMPROFON)	5
New Zealand Albums (RMNZ)	7
Norwegian Albums (VG-lista)	1
Portuguese Albums (AFP)	1
Scottish Albums (Official Charts)	2
Slovenian Albums (IFPI)	1
Spanish Albums (Promusicae)	1
Swedish Albums (Sverigetopplistan)	1
Swiss Albums (Schweizer Hitparade)	6
UK Albums (Official Charts)	1
US Billboard 200	5
US Top Classical Albums (Billboard)	1

=== Year-end charts ===
Chart (2008)	Position
Australian Albums (ARIA)	23
Belgian Albums (Ultratop Flanders)	47
Dutch Albums (Album Top 100)	15
French Albums (SNEP)	178
Mexican Albums (AMPROFON)	59
Swedish Albums (Sverigetopplistan)	5
Swiss Albums (Schweizer Hitparade)	37
UK Albums (OCC)	17

Chart (2009)	Position
Austrian Albums (Ö3 Austria)	55
Belgian Albums (Ultratop Flanders)	50
Belgian Albums (Ultratop Wallonia)	63
Canadian Albums (Billboard)	8
Dutch Albums (Album Top 100)	30
Swedish Albums (Sverigetopplistan)	87
US Billboard 200	41
US Top Classical Albums (Billboard)	1

Chart (2010)	Position
US Top Classical Albums (Billboard)	9

== Certifications and sales ==
Region	Certification	Certified units/sales
Australia (ARIA)	Platinum	70,000^{^}
Austria (IFPI Austria)	Gold	10,000^{*}
Belgium (BRMA)	Gold	15,000^{*}
Canada	—	162,000
Finland (Musiikkituottajat)	Gold	19,343
Greece (IFPI Greece)	Gold	7,500^{^}
Germany (BVMI)	Gold	100,000^{‡}
Hungary (MAHASZ)	Gold	3,000^{^}
Ireland (IRMA)	2× Platinum	30,000^{^}
Mexico (AMPROFON)	Gold	40,000^{^}
Netherlands (NVPI)	Platinum	60,000^{^}
New Zealand (RMNZ)	Gold	7,500^{^}
Portugal (AFP)	2× Platinum	40,000^{^}
Spain (Promusicae)	2× Platinum	160,000^{^}
Sweden (GLF)	Platinum	40,000^{^}
Switzerland (IFPI Switzerland)	Platinum	30,000^{^}
United Kingdom (BPI)	Platinum	300,000^{^}
United States (RIAA)	Gold	500,000^{^}
Summaries
Europe (IFPI)	Platinum	1,000,000^{*}
Worldwide	—	2,700,000
^{*} Sales figures based on certification alone.^{^} Shipments figures based on certification alone.^{‡} Sales+streaming figures based on certification alone.
