= Live in Japan (Il Divo album) =

Live album by Il Divo
- Released: 1 December 2014
- Recorded: 11 March 2014
- Venue: Nippon Budokan
- Genre: Classical crossover
- Label: Sony; Syco; Columbia

Il Divo chronology
An Evening with Il Divo: Live in Barcelona (2009)	Live in Japan (2014)

Live in Japan

Video by Il Divo
- Released: 1 December 2014
- Recorded: 11 March 2014
- Venue: Nippon Budokan
- Genre: Classical crossover
- Label: Sony; Syco; Columbia

Il Divo chronology
Live in London (2011)	Live in Japan (2014)

Live in Japan, also known as A Musical Affair: Live in Japan, is the second live album by crossover classical group Il Divo, released on 12 November 2014 in Japan and 1 December 2014 in the rest of the world. The release shows the concert in Tokyo on 11 March 2014, in the Theatre Nippon Budokan. It follows their first live album An Evening with Il Divo: Live in Barcelona, released in 2009.

The artist Lea Salonga was invited by Il Divo to participate on some of the songs.

Urs Bühler said of the album, "we are very proud to have captured our concert at the Budokan, one of the most legendary theatres of the world. It marks a milestone in our career."

== Track listing ==
=== DVD ===
1. "Tonight"
2. "Some Enchanted Evening"
3. "If Ever I Would Leave You"
4. "Can You Feel the Love Tonight? (Es La Noche del Amor)" (duet with Lea Salonga)
5. "Memory (Piano)" (duet with Lea Salonga)
6. "I Will Always Love You (Siempre Te Amaré)"
7. "Don't Cry for Me Argentina"
8. "Don't Let the Sun Go Down on Me (Pour que tu m'aimes encore)"
9. "Somewhere"
10. "The Winner Takes It All (Va Todo al Ganador)"
11. "Bring Him Home (Salvalo)"
12. "Love Changes Everything"
13. "Who Can I Turn To?"
14. "Music of the Night" (duet with Lea Salonga)
15. "The Impossible Dream (The Quest)"
16. "You'll Never Walk Alone"
17. "My Way (A Mi Manera)"
18. "Time to Say Goodbye (Con Te Partirò)" (duet with Lea Salonga)

=== CD ===
1. "Tonight"
2. "Some Enchanted Evening"
3. "Can You Feel the Love Tonight? (Es La Noche del Amor)" (duet with Lea Salonga)
4. "Memory (Piano)" (duet with Lea Salonga)
5. "I Will Always Love You (Siempre Te Amaré)"
6. "Don't Cry for Me Argentina"
7. "Somewhere"
8. "The Winner Takes It All (Va Todo al Ganador"
9. "Bring Him Home (Salvalo)"
10. "Love Changes Everything"
11. "Music of the Night" (duet with Lea Salonga)
12. "The Impossible Dream (The Quest)"
13. "My Way (A Mi Manera)"
14. "Time to Say Goodbye (Con Te Partirò)" (duet with Lea Salonga)
15. "A Whole New World" (duet with Lea Salonga)
- The Japanese version of the CD/DVD includes the songs "Flowers Will Bloom" and "Furusato".

== Charts ==
Chart performance for Live in Japan
Chart (2014)	Peak position
Belgian Albums (Ultratop Flanders)	57
Belgian Albums (Ultratop Wallonia)	110
Dutch Albums (Album Top 100)	55
Irish Albums (IRMA)	98
Portuguese Albums (AFP)	19

== Certifications ==
Certifications for Live in Japan
Region	Certification	Certified units/sales
United Kingdom (BPI)	Silver	60,000^{*}
^{*} Sales figures based on certification alone.
