= Wicked Game (Il Divo album) =

Studio album by Il Divo
- Released: 4 November 2011
- Recorded: 2009–2011
- Genre: Classical crossover
- Label: Syco; Columbia
- Producer: Per Magnusson; David Kreuger

Il Divo chronology
| The Promise (2008) | Wicked Game (2011) | A Musical Affair (2013) |

Wicked Game is the sixth studio album by the classical crossover group Il Divo. The album was released on 4 November 2011. Il Divo performed "Wicked Game", their reworking of the Chris Isaak song, on TV in the UK on 5 September on Red or Black? and in the United States on 7 September on the semi-final of America's Got Talent.

In October 2012, it was announced that Il Divo would tour with Katherine Jenkins for the first time, throughout Europe and North America.

== Background ==
In September 2011, the group announced the album on their website. One of the members, Carlos Marin, describes the recording of the new album as "unbelievable - you can really hear the evolution. And that connection between us, the way that the combination produces magic, it's stronger than ever." Swiss member Urs Buhler said he believes this new album will delight you, the fans, as much as it has them. "We think it's the best thing we've ever done."

== Track listing ==
1. "Wicked Game (Melanconia)"
2. "Crying (Llorando)"
3. "Don't Cry for Me Argentina"
4. "Dov'è l'amore"
5. "Falling Slowly (Te prometo)"
6. "Come What May (Te amare)"
7. "Senza parole"
8. "Stay (Ven a mi)"
9. "Sempre Sempre"
10. "Time to Say Goodbye (Con te partirò)"

== Charts ==
=== Weekly charts ===
| Chart (2011) | Peak position |
|---|---|
| Australian Albums (ARIA) | 11 |
| Austrian Albums (Ö3 Austria) | 12 |
| Belgian Albums (Ultratop Flanders) | 3 |
| Belgian Albums (Ultratop Wallonia) | 28 |
| Canadian Albums (Billboard) | 11 |
| Dutch Albums (Album Top 100) | 2 |
| Finnish Albums (Suomen virallinen lista) | 21 |
| German Albums (Offizielle Top 100) | 28 |
| Hungarian Albums (MAHASZ) | 28 |
| Irish Albums (IRMA) | 15 |
| New Zealand Albums (RMNZ) | 12 |
| Norwegian Albums (VG-lista) | 27 |
| Portuguese Albums (AFP) | 4 |
| Scottish Albums (OCC) | 7 |
| Spanish Albums (PROMUSICAE) | 7 |
| Swedish Albums (Sverigetopplistan) | 12 |
| Swiss Albums (Schweizer Hitparade) | 3 |
| UK Albums (OCC) | 6 |
| US Billboard 200 | 10 |
| US Top Classical Albums (Billboard) | 1 |

=== Year-end charts ===
| Chart (2011) | Position |
|---|---|
| Australian Albums (ARIA) | 94 |
| Swiss Albums (Schweizer Hitparade) | 59 |
| UK Albums (OCC) | 55 |
| US Top Classical Albums (Billboard) | 5 |
| Chart (2012) | Position |
| Belgian Albums (Ultratop Flanders) | 45 |
| Canadian Albums (Billboard) | 36 |
| Dutch Albums (Album Top 100) | 84 |
| Spanish Albums (PROMUSICAE) | 27 |
| Swiss Albums (Schweizer Hitparade) | 89 |
| US Top Classical Albums (Billboard) | 4 |
| Chart (2013) | Position |
| US Top Classical Albums (Billboard) | 34 |

== Release history ==
| Region | Date | Format |
|---|---|---|
| United Kingdom | 4 November 2011 | CD, digital download |

== Certifications ==
Certifications for Wicked Game
| Region | Certification | Certified units/sales |
|---|---|---|
| Australia (ARIA) | Gold | 35,000^{^} |
| Canada (Music Canada) | Gold | 40,000^{^} |
| Netherlands (NVPI) | Platinum | 50,000^{^} |
| Portugal (AFP) | Platinum | 15,000^{^} |
| Spain (PROMUSICAE) | Platinum | 40,000^{^} |
| Switzerland (IFPI Switzerland) | Gold | 15,000^{^} |
| United Kingdom (BPI) | Gold | 100,000^{*} |
^{*} Sales figures based on certification alone.^{^} Shipments figures based on certification alone.
