= Siempre (Il Divo album) =

Studio album by Il Divo
- Released: 21 November 2006
- Genre: Classical crossover
- Length: 44:14
- Labels: Syco; Columbia
- Producers: Steve Mac; Per Magnusson; David Kreuger

Il Divo chronology
Ancora (2005)	Siempre (2006)	The Promise (2008)

Professional ratings
Review scores
Source	Rating
AllMusic	3/5 stars

Siempre is the fourth studio album by the classical crossover vocal group Il Divo. It was released on 21 November 2006 in the United States and globally on 27 November 2006 by Syco Music and Columbia Records.

== Background ==
According to producer Steve Mac in an interview with HitQuarters, preparation for the album would involve Simon Cowell compiling a list of around 200 potential songs. Cowell would then whittle this number down to around 40 which he then presented to Mac for consideration. Mac would then tell Cowell which of these would or would not work. When the song list had been reduced to around 18 or 19 songs Mac would then try out the songs with the band to see which worked for them. 15 songs would then be recorded for the album.

The songs on Siempre ("Always" in Spanish) include new arrangements of "Nights in White Satin" (originally by The Moody Blues), "Caruso", "Without You", "Somewhere", "You Raise Me Up", a new version of the song "Music" from the 1970s renamed "Musica", and re-arranged by its original British composer John Miles. The album also features a cover of Bryan Adams' "Have You Ever Really Loved a Woman?" translated into the Spanish "Un regalo que te dio la vida" (which literally means "A Gift That Life Gave You"). The album includes the Spanish adaptation by the famous Mexican composer and musician Armando Manzanero of "Una noche" ("One Night", Spanish). Other original songs in this album include "La vida sin amor" ("Life without Love," Spanish), and "Come primavera" ("Like Spring", Italian).

== Track listing ==
No.	Title	Writer(s)	Length
1.	"Notte di luce" (Nights in White Satin)	Mario Frangoulis, Justin Hayward	4:18
2.	"Caruso"	Lucio Dalla	3:56
3.	"Desde el día que te fuiste" (Without You)	Peter Ham, Tom Evans	3:51
4.	"Come Primavera"	Cheope, Henrik Janson, David Kreuger, Per Magnusson	3:50
5.	"Un regalo que te dio la vida" (Have You Ever Really Loved a Woman?)	Bryan Adams, Michael Kamen, Robert John "Mutt" Lange, Rudy Perez	4:39
6.	"La vida sin amor"	Carlos Gómez, David Kreuger, Per Magnusson	3:39
7.	"Una noche"	Savan Kotecha, Andreas Romdhane y Josef Larossi	4:12
8.	"Por ti seré" (You Raise Me Up)	Brendan Graham, Rolf Løvland, Lo Ta-yu	4:02
9.	"Amor venme a buscar"	Steve Mac, Rudy Pérez, John Reid	4:14
10.	"Música"	John Miles	3:59
11.	"Somewhere" (Extra)	Leonard Bernstein, Stephen Sondheim	3:30

Notes

- In the United States, varying stores had the rights to different songs from their Live at the Greek DVD, which were used to make up an exclusive live bonus track, ensuring that an album of 11 tracks was released to the US like every other country would receive.

== Charts ==
=== Weekly charts ===
Chart (2006–2007)	Peak position
Australian Albums (ARIA)	2
Australian Classical Albums (ARIA)	1
Austrian Albums (Ö3 Austria)	9
Belgian Albums (Ultratop Flanders)	2
Belgian Albums (Ultratop Wallonia)	4
Canadian Albums (Billboard)	1
Danish Albums (Hitlisten)	4
Dutch Albums (Album Top 100)	1
European Albums (Billboard)	2
Finnish Albums (Suomen virallinen lista)	2
French Albums (SNEP)	10
German Albums (Offizielle Top 100)	22
Hungarian Albums (MAHASZ)	28
Irish Albums (IRMA)	2
Italian Albums (FIMI)	59
Japanese Albums (Oricon)	23
Mexican Albums (Top 100 Mexico)	27
New Zealand Albums (RMNZ)	3
Norwegian Albums (VG-lista)	7
Portuguese Albums (AFP)	3
Scottish Albums (Official Charts)	3
Spanish Albums (Promusicae)	1
Swedish Albums (Sverigetopplistan)	4
Swiss Albums (Schweizer Hitparade)	1
UK Albums (Official Charts)	2
US Billboard 200	6
US Top Classical Albums (Billboard)	1

=== Year-end charts ===
Chart (2006)	Position
Australian Albums (ARIA)	36
Australian Classical Albums (ARIA)	2
Belgian Albums (Ultratop Flanders)	49
Belgian Albums (Ultratop Wallonia)	89
Dutch Albums (Album Top 100)	17
Finnish Albums (Suomen virallinen lista)	18
French Albums (SNEP)	91
Irish Albums (IRMA)	13
Spanish Albums (PROMUSICAE)	9
Swedish Albums (Sverigetopplistan)	29
Swiss Albums (Schweizer Hitparade)	30
UK Albums (OCC)	20
Worldwide Albums (IFPI)	9

Chart (2007)	Position
Australian Classical Albums (ARIA)	5
Austrian Albums (Ö3 Austria)	61
Belgian Albums (Ultratop Flanders)	58
Dutch Albums (Album Top 100)	18
European Albums (Billboard)	16
Spanish Albums (PROMUSICAE)	3
Swedish Albums (Sverigetopplistan)	70
Swiss Albums (Schweizer Hitparade)	55
UK Albums (OCC)	176
US Billboard 200	46
US Top Classical Crossover Albums (Billboard)	2

== Certifications ==
Region	Certification	Certified units/sales
Argentina (CAPIF)	Gold	20,000^{^}
Australia (ARIA)	2× Platinum	140,000^{^}
Austria (IFPI Austria)	Gold	15,000^{*}
Belgium (BRMA)	Platinum	50,000^{*}
Canada (Music Canada)	3× Platinum	300,000^{^}
Denmark (IFPI Danmark)	Gold	20,000^{^}
Finland (Musiikkituottajat)	Gold	24,836
France (SNEP)	Gold	75,000^{*}
Hungary (MAHASZ)	Gold	3,000^{^}
Ireland (IRMA)	4× Platinum	60,000^{^}
Mexico (AMPROFON)	Platinum	100,000^{^}
Netherlands (NVPI)	2× Platinum	140,000^{^}
New Zealand (RMNZ)	Platinum	15,000^{^}
Portugal (AFP)	2× Platinum	40,000^{^}
Russia (NFPF)	Gold	10,000^{*}
Spain (Promusicae)	4× Platinum	320,000^{^}
Sweden (GLF)	Platinum	40,000^{^}
Switzerland (IFPI Switzerland)	Platinum	30,000^{^}
United Kingdom (BPI)	2× Platinum	600,000^{^}
United States (RIAA)	Platinum	1,100,000
Summaries
Europe (IFPI)	Platinum	1,000,000^{*}
^{*} Sales figures based on certification alone.^{^} Shipments figures based on certification alone.
