= Ancora =

Studio album by Il Divo
- Released: 7 November 2005
- Recorded: February 2004 – August 2005
- Studios: Metropolis Studios, London
- Genre: Classical crossover
- Length: 44:49
- Labels: Syco, Columbia
- Producer: Steve Mac

Il Divo chronology
The Christmas Collection (2005)	Ancora (2005)	Siempre (2006)

Singles from Ancora
- 1. "Unchained Melody (Senza catene)" Released: 8 July 2005; 2. "O Holy Night" Released: 18 September 2005; 3. "I Believe in You (Je Crois en Toi)" Released: 14 November 2005; 4. "All By Myself (Solo Otra Vez)" Released: 22 January 2006

Professional ratings
Review scores
Source	Rating
AllMusic	3/5 stars

Ancora is the third studio album released by classical crossover vocal group Il Divo. The album was released in the United Kingdom and other parts of Europe on 7 November 2005, excluding the United States and Latin America. The album was later released in the United States and Latin America on 24 January 2006. It debuted at number one on the Billboard 200 on the week of releases. The album contains one song partially in Latin, one song performed in Italian, two songs performed in French, two songs performed in English, and six songs performed in Spanish, excluding the bonus track. The album features the single "I Believe in You", performed with Celine Dion, that is also featured on her international album, On Ne Change Pas.

This was recorded in both Sweden and London with producers Per Magnusson, David Kreuger and Steve Mac, who were also the producers of their first album. Released on 7 November 2005 in the UK, it hit number one both in the UK and Australia within one week. Ancora was released in the US on 24 January 2006. It entered the Billboard albums chart at number 1, selling more than 150,000 copies during its first week of sales.

Highlights include "Isabel", "I Believe in You (Je crois en toi)", a duet with Celine Dion, a Spanish version of Secret Garden's "You Raise Me Up" (Por ti seré), and a Spanish cover of Eric Carmen's "All by Myself". Two of the tracks on the non-American release of this CD, "O Holy Night" and a version of Schubert's "Ave Maria", also appear on 2005's The Christmas Collection.

== Track listing ==
No.	Title	Writer(s)	Length
1.	"Heroe"	Mariah Carey; Walter Afanasieff	4:17
2.	"Isabel"	Andreas Romdhane	4:16
3.	"I Believe in You (Je crois en toi)" (with Celine Dion)	Jörgen Elofsson; Per Magnusson; David Kreuger; Matteo Saggese; Luc Plamondon	4:01
4.	"Unchained Melody (Senza Catene)"	Alex North	3:50
5.	"Si Tú Me Amas"	Andreas Romdhane; John Reid; Josef Larossi	4:09
6.	"Ave Maria"	Franz Schubert	4:52
7.	"Hasta Mi Final"	Wayne Hector; Steve Mac	3:36
8.	"All by Myself (Solo Otra Vez)"	Eric Carmen; Sergei Rachmaninoff	3:54
9.	"En Aranjuez con tu Amor"	Alfredo Garcia Segura; Joaquín Rodrigo	3:51
10.	"Pour que tu m'aimes encore"	Jean-Jacques Goldman	3:56
11.	"O Holy Night"	Adolphe Adam; John Sullivan Dwight	4:03

American Edition
No.	Title	Writer(s)	Length
1.	"All by Myself (Solo Otra Vez)"	Eric Carmen, Sergei Rachmaninoff	3:54
2.	"Isabel"	Romdhane	4:16
3.	"I Believe in You (Je crois en toi)" (with Celine Dion)	Elofsson, Kreuger, Magnusson	4:01
4.	"You Raise Me Up (Por Ti Seré)"	Brendan Graham, Rolf Løvland, Lo Ta-yu	4:01
5.	"Si Tú Me Amas"	Larossi, Reid, Romdhane	4:09
6.	"Hasta Mi Final"	Hector, Mac	3:36
7.	"Heroe"	Mariah Carey, Walter Afanasieff	4:17
8.	"En Aranjuez con tu Amor"	Garcia, Rodrigo	3:51
9.	"Esisti Dentro Me"	Romdhane	3:49
10.	"Pour que tu m'aimes encore"	Goldman	3:56

== Charts ==
=== Weekly charts ===
Chart (2005–2006)	Peak position
Australian Albums (ARIA)	1
Austrian Albums (Ö3 Austria)	6
Belgian Albums (Ultratop Flanders)	2
Belgian Albums (Ultratop Wallonia)	3
Canadian Albums (Billboard)	1
Danish Albums (Hitlisten)	11
Dutch Albums (Album Top 100)	2
Finnish Albums (Suomen virallinen lista)	1
French Albums (SNEP)	9
German Albums (Offizielle Top 100)	18
Hungarian Albums (MAHASZ)	7
Irish Albums (IRMA)	3
Italian Albums (FIMI)	15
Malaysian International Albums (RIM)	9
New Zealand Albums (RMNZ)	1
Norwegian Albums (VG-lista)	2
Portuguese Albums (AFP)	1
Scottish Albums (Official Charts)	2
South African Albums (RISA)	3
Spanish Albums (Promusicae)	1
Swedish Albums (Sverigetopplistan)	3
Swiss Albums (Schweizer Hitparade)	4
UK Albums (Official Charts)	1
US Billboard 200	1
US Top Classical Albums (Billboard)	1

=== Year-end charts ===
Chart (2005)	Position
Australian Albums (ARIA)	20
Belgian Albums (Ultratop Flanders)	42
Belgian Albums (Ultratop Wallonia)	43
Dutch Albums (Album Top 100)	14
European Albums (Billboard)	90
French Albums (SNEP)	98
Hungarian Albums (MAHASZ)	52
Irish Albums (IRMA)	11
New Zealand Albums (RMNZ)	19
Swedish Albums (Sverigetopplistan)	19
Swiss Albums (Schweizer Hitparade)	88
UK Albums (OCC)	14
Worldwide Albums (IFPI)	21

Chart (2006)	Position
Australian Albums (ARIA)	21
Austrian Albums (Ö3 Austria)	32
Belgian Albums (Ultratop Flanders)	31
Belgian Albums (Ultratop Wallonia)	23
Dutch Albums (Album Top 100)	14
European Albums (Billboard)	10
French Albums (SNEP)	90
German Albums (Offizielle Top 100)	89
Hungarian Albums (MAHASZ)	64
South African Albums (RISA)	14
Swiss Albums (Schweizer Hitparade)	12
UK Albums (OCC)	123
US Billboard 200	82

=== Decade-end chart ===
Chart (2000–09)	Position
Australian Albums (ARIA)	72

== Certifications ==
Region	Certification	Certified units/sales
Argentina (CAPIF)	2× Platinum	80,000^{^}
Australia (ARIA)	4× Platinum	280,000^{^}
Austria (IFPI Austria)	Platinum	30,000^{*}
Belgium (BRMA)	2× Platinum	100,000^{*}
Canada (Music Canada)	3× Platinum	300,000^{^}
Denmark (IFPI Danmark)	Gold	20,000^{^}
Finland (Musiikkituottajat)	2× Platinum	62,647
France (SNEP)	Platinum	200,000^{*}
Germany (BVMI)	Gold	100,000^{^}
Hungary (MAHASZ)	Platinum	10,000^{^}
Ireland (IRMA)	5× Platinum	75,000^{^}
Japan (RIAJ)	Gold	100,000^{^}
Mexico (AMPROFON)	Platinum	100,000^{^}
New Zealand (RMNZ)	2× Platinum	30,000^{^}
Portugal (AFP)	2× Platinum	40,000^{^}
Russia (NFPF)	Platinum	20,000^{*}
Spain (Promusicae)	4× Platinum	320,000^{^}
Sweden (GLF)	Platinum	60,000^{^}
Switzerland (IFPI Switzerland)	Platinum	40,000^{^}
United Kingdom (BPI)	3× Platinum	900,000^{^}
United States (RIAA)	Gold	1,100,000
Summaries
Europe (IFPI)	2× Platinum	2,000,000^{*}
^{*} Sales figures based on certification alone.^{^} Shipments figures based on certification alone.
