= Il Divo (album) =

Studio album by Il Divo
- Released: 1 November 2004 (United Kingdom); 19 April 2005 (United States)
- Recorded: February – September 2004, Metropolis Studios, London
- Genre: Classical crossover
- Length: 53:52
- Label: Syco, Columbia
- Producer: Steve Mac

Il Divo chronology
Il Divo (2004)	Ancora (2005)

Singles from Il Divo
- 1. "Regresa a mí" Released: 22 October 2004; 2. "My Way (A mi manera)" Released: 18 February 2005; 3. "Mama" Released: 7 May 2005; 4. "Unchained Melody (Senza catene)" Released: 8 July 2005

Professional ratings
Review scores
Source	Rating
AllMusic	3/5 stars

Il Divo is the debut studio album to be released by classical crossover vocal group Il Divo, formed by Simon Cowell in 2004. The album was released on 1 November 2004 in the United Kingdom, via Syco Music, and on 19 April 2005 in the United States, via Columbia Records. The album contains three songs performed in English, six songs performed in Italian, and three songs performed in Spanish, excluding the bonus track. As of December 2013, the album had sold more than 1.5 million copies in the UK. The album has sold more than 5,000,000 worldwide copies to date.

Recording started in the first half of 2004 in Sweden, with producers Quiz & Larossi, Per Magnusson & David Kreuger and in the UK with producer Steve Mac. This self-titled album contained the Spanish Regresa a mí, their second single and first original song Mama; Sinatra's My Way (A mi manera); Nella Fantasia, and 1994's San Remo Festival winner Passerà.

The album hit the No. 1 slot on both Amazon.com and BarnesandNoble.com after a career-defining appearance on The Oprah Winfrey Show on 5 April 2005, where they performed Regresa a mí.

In the United Kingdom, the Il Divo album knocked Robbie Williams off the number 1 spot in the UK charts, Williams allegedly said to them at the Bridget Jones: The Edge of Reason film premiere, "So you are the four idiots who have forced me off my number one spot!"

This multiplatinum-selling CD became number one in the charts in a total of 13 countries around the world, and achieved top 5 placing in 25 countries.

== Singles ==
- "Regresa a mí" was released as the album's lead single on 22 October 2004. The song is a cover of the original English-language version performed by R&B singer Toni Braxton, originally released in June 1996. The single remain's the band most successful single release to date. The band's Spanish version of the track received positive appreciation from critics, who said that the cover "has the potential to be a hit and to open doors for many of operas most acclaimed stars."
- "Mama" was released as the album's third single on 7 May 2005. "Mama" was the first original song ever released as a single by the band. It was released both as limited edition CD single and DVD single. It was also included on the band's live album, Live at the Greek Theatre. The songwriters behind "Mama", Andreas "Quiz" Romdhane and Josef Larossi, have contributed the largest number of original songs for the band, including "Sei parte ormai di me", "Isabel", "Si tu me amas", "Esisti dentro me" and "Una Noche". The song has also been covered and translated into other languages, including to Afrikaans by the artist Kurt Darren, and into Italian by Paul Potts.

== Track listing ==
No.	Title	Writer(s)	Producer(s)	Length
1.	"Regresa a mí"	Diane Warren	Steve Mac	4:42
2.	"Mama"	Andreas Romdhane, Josef Larossi, Savan Kotecha	Steve Mac, Quiz & Larossi	3:19
3.	"Nella Fantasia"	Ennio Morricone, Chiara Ferraù	Per Magnusson, David Kreuger	4:26
4.	"Passerà"	Aleandro Baldi, Giancarlo Bigazzi, Marco Falagiani	Steve Mac	4:40
5.	"Everytime I Look at You"	Andy Hill, John Reid	Per Magnusson, David Kreuger	3:31
6.	"Ti amerò"	Matteo Saggese, Per Magnusson, David Kreuger, Frank Musker	Per Magnusson, David Kreuger	4:01
7.	"Dentro un altro si"	Andy Hill, Don Black	Per Magnusson, David Kreuger	4:34
8.	"The Man You Love"	Steve Mac, Blair Daly, Troy Verges	Steve Mac	3:56
9.	"Feelings"	Jörgen Elofsson	Steve Mac	3:39
10.	"Hoy que ya no estás aquí"	Jörgen Elofsson, Tony Vincent	Steve Mac, Mathias Venge	4:19
11.	"Sei parte ormai di me"	Andreas Romdhane, Josef Larossi, Brian McFadden, Shane Filan, Matteo Saggese, Mino Vergnaghi	Quiz & Larossi	4:28
12.	"My Way (A mi manera)"	Jacques Revaux, Claude François, Gilles Thibaut, Paul Anka	Steve Mac	4:28

American Bonus Track
No.	Title	Length
13.	"Unchained Melody (Senza catene)"	3:51

== Charts ==
=== Weekly charts ===
Chart (2004–05)	Peak position
Australian Albums (ARIA)	1
Austrian Albums (Ö3 Austria)	2
Belgian Albums (Ultratop Flanders)	3
Belgian Albums (Ultratop Wallonia)	2
Canadian Albums (Billboard)	1
Dutch Albums (Album Top 100)	1
Finnish Albums (Suomen virallinen lista)	1
French Albums (SNEP)	4
German Albums (Offizielle Top 100)	2
Hungarian Albums (MAHASZ)	3
Irish Albums (IRMA)	2
Italian Albums (FIMI)	63
New Zealand Albums (RMNZ)	3
Norwegian Albums (VG-lista)	2
Portuguese Albums (AFP)	2
Scottish Albums (OCC)	1
Spanish Albums (Promusicae)	2
Swedish Albums (Sverigetopplistan)	1
Swiss Albums (Schweizer Hitparade)	2
UK Albums (OCC)	1
US Billboard 200	4
US Top Classical Albums (Billboard)	1

=== Year-end charts ===
Chart (2004)	Position
UK Albums (OCC)	10

Chart (2005)	Position
Australian Albums (ARIA)	12
Austrian Albums (Ö3 Austria)	34
Dutch Albums (Album Top 100)	8
French Albums (SNEP)	50
German Albums (Offizielle Top 100)	67
Hungarian Albums (MAHASZ)	20
New Zealand Albums (RMNZ)	18
Swedish Albums (Sverigetopplistan)	5
Swiss Albums (Schweizer Hitparade)	18
UK Albums (OCC)	48
US Billboard 200	64
Worldwide Albums (IFPI)	16

Chart (2006)	Position
Australian Albums (ARIA)	79
Hungarian Albums (MAHASZ)	64
UK Albums (OCC)	162
US Billboard 200	168

=== Decade-end charts ===
Chart (2000–2009)	Position
UK Albums (OCC)	62

== Certifications ==
Region	Certification	Certified units/sales
Argentina (CAPIF)	3× Platinum	120,000^{^}
Australia (ARIA)	3× Platinum	210,000^{^}
Austria (IFPI Austria)	Platinum	30,000^{*}
Belgium (BRMA)	2× Platinum	100,000^{*}
Canada (Music Canada)	3× Platinum	300,000^{^}
Finland (Musiikkituottajat)	2× Platinum	66,441
France (SNEP)	2× Gold	200,000^{*}
Germany (BVMI)	Gold	100,000^{^}
Hungary (MAHASZ)	Platinum	20,000^{^}
Mexico (AMPROFON)	2× Platinum	200,000^{^}
Netherlands (NVPI)	2× Platinum	160,000^{^}
New Zealand (RMNZ)	2× Platinum	30,000^{^}
Norway (IFPI Norway)	Platinum	40,000^{*}
Portugal (AFP)	Platinum	40,000^{^}
Spain (Promusicae)	4× Platinum	320,000^{^}
Sweden (GLF)	Platinum	60,000^{^}
Switzerland (IFPI Switzerland)	Platinum	40,000^{^}
Taiwan	—	30,000 (Note: Taiwanese estimated sales as of January 2006.)
United Kingdom (BPI)	5× Platinum	1,500,000^{*}
United States (RIAA)	Platinum	1,000,000^{^}
Summaries
Europe (IFPI)	2× Platinum	2,000,000^{*}
^{*} Sales figures based on certification alone.^{^} Shipments figures based on certification alone.
