= PPX Enterprises, Inc. =

Defunct American record label

- Founder: Ed Chalpin
- Defunct: Defunct
- Distributor: Various
- Genre: Various
- Country of origin: United States
- Location: New York

PPX Enterprises, Inc. was the umbrella organization for various PPX entities which includes P.P.X. and PPX Productions. The label, like its Founder Ed Chalpin is quite likely remembered for its dealings Jimi Hendrix and producing cover versions of past hits.

== Background ==
PPX Enterprises, Inc. provided cover versions of top hits from the 1950s to the present in various genres. These could be obtained for use by record companies, duplicators, for films use, background music, radio and television.

The company was formed by Ed Chalpin in 1961, who had been in the music business since 1956.

Known for turning out cover-versions of songs, it was estimated in 1975 that PPX had a catalogue of around 5,000 titles. Subsidiaries of PPX Enterprises include Dimensional Sound which was located at 301 W 54 St., New York, NY 10019.

Music trade magazine Billboard once referred to Ed Chalpin as a pioneer of cover version recordings. Cover versions are sometimes referred to as exploito, and in reference to psychedelic rock cover versions, the term is part of the title of the album, I Said, She Said, Ah Cid: The Exploito Psych World Of Alshire Records 1967-71.

Artists who were signed over the years to PPX include, Jimmy Cliff, Jimi Hendrix, Curtis Knight, Anthony Swete and Ella Moore.

== History ==
=== 1960s ===
In 1962, Ed Chalpin had signed contracts with RCA Mexicana and Gamma Records to promote his pre-recorded tapes catalogue.

It was reported by Cash Box in the magazine's 18 November 1962 issue that PPX Enterprises were expanding their business into Latin America. Under Ed Chalpin's supervision, Stanley Steinhouse would be covering the development of PPX in all the Latin American markets. Representing PPX Enterprises in Venezuela was Fabrica Venezolana de Discos which Steinhouse was also involved with. Also the Hitsvillve series of records with PPX recordings had been issued.

The 4 November, 1967 issue of RPM Weekly wrote that PPX Enterprises had announced the finalization of their national negotiations for two new Jimi Hendrix LPs. The English Decca and London labels were set to run with them. There were also negotiations in process for release Germany, Austria and Switzerland.

Chalpin had announced that P.P.X. Enterprises, Inc. had opened an office in Canada at 2050 Stanley Street, Montreal on 12 August 1967. Starting off with French Canada, the territory was to be overseen by Andre Montell. The plan was to later expand to include the rest of the country.

=== 1970s to 1980s ===
According to Cash Box in the magazine's May 9, 1970 issue, Anthony Swete along with Curtis Knight and Ella Moore were to have releases in the near future on the Paramount label. They were to be promoted under the wing of Bill Gallagher of Famous Music. With Knight's album Down in the Village already released, Swete and Moore were to have their recordings released in the near future.

It was reported by Billboard in the magazine's 17 February, 1973 issue that PPX Enterprises, Inc. had taken legal action against the administrator of Jimi Hendrix's estate, Polydor Records; Track Records, Michael Frank Jeffery, of London, and Yameta Ltd., Nassau, Bahamas. The case came about as a result of Hendrix who was making a living as a guitarist and a member of The Squires had made a recording at PPX Studios with a member of the group and on October 15, 1965, had entered into a contract for three years.

As of July 1979, PPX Enterprises, Inc. was located at 301 West 54th St., New York, N.Y. 10019.

=== 1990s to 2020s ===
In April 1999, Chuck D, the frontman for the group Public Enemy and their producer, Hank Shocklee were directed by a judge to pay PPX more than $87,120 due to a violation of an agreement. Apparently PPX was denied $65,881.30 in revenue from recordings on Def Jame that Public Enemy made between 1994 and 1998.

According to the 6 July 2021 issue of Fader, PPX Enterprises owner Ed Chalpin had been enlisted by A Tribe Called Quest to oversee their deal with Jive Records. Apparently, founding member Ali Shaheed Muhammad and the rest of the group were unaware that Chalpin had added a clause to the deal that with the next five records, his company PPX Enterprises would be getting a percentage of the royalties. When the band were recording their Low End Theory album they embarked on a mission to have the clause erased. A court case involving Jive Records ensued. They later discovered that PPX had sold their share of a settlement they made with Jive Records to a party who entered into a partnership with the music royalties portal, Royalty Exchange.

== Artists ==
- Jimmy Cliff had signed with PPX in 1973. It was reported in the 12 May 1973 edition of Billboard that Chalpin was now the manager of singer Cliff and had signed deals with Warner Brothers, and EMI.
- Jimi Hendrix had signed a contract with PPX in 1965 when he was Curtis Knight's side man.
- The Hubs were an unnamed group of studio musicians who recorded instrumental cover versions for PPX. They also used the names, The Downbeats and The Contrasts. One recording they did for PPX was "Memphis" which was on the B side of "Ring of Fire" by Dan Gaynes.
- Mark Juhns recorded for the label. He had the "Spirit in the Sky" backed with Jerry Walsh's cover of "Bridge over Troubled Waters". The single was released in Italy on Clan Celentano BF. ES. 92 in 1970. The recordings were licensed from PPX. The previous year the "Backfield in Motion" bw "Make Believe" single had been released. Anthony Swete was the vocalist on the A side while Juhn's was the vocalist on the B side. He also had two singles released in 1970 on the RCA Twin Hits series. "Cowboy Convention" bw "Evil Woman" was released on PPX 1003. The other single was "Spirit in the Sky" bw "Always Something There to Remind Me". Dean Gregory sang on the B side.
- Curtis Knight had been with PPX from at least 1965.
- Tim Reynolds was quite prolific with PPX, releasing nearly thirty singles that featured him as the primary artist or sharing the single with another artist on either the A or B side. He recorded his version of "Working for the Man". It was given a three star rating by Billboard in the 10 November, 1962 issue. Having entered the Cash Box Top 100 chart on 3 November 1962, his version of "Working for the Man" and was sharing the no. 35 spot with Roy Orbison who had already established the song in the chart. Both singles peaked at no. 32 on the week of 17 November. Both Orbison and Reynolds' singles were still in the chart at no. 63 on the week of 8 December. This was their final chart entry. Other songs recorded were "Maybelline" which was released as the B side on Twin Hits 5035. He appeared on about eleven Twin Hits singles that were released in Australia, most of them with another artist on the flip side. One of them "Hey Paula" was a duet with Jean Madison. Reynolds was the credited artist on the B side song "Rhythm of the Rain".
- Anthony Swete, a PPX recording artist brought the label success in 1968 and 1969 with his versions of "Judy in Disguise" and "Hold Me Tight". Both of them were top-ten hits in Argentina. Ed Chalpin even accompanied Swete to Argentina in February that year. Swete had his version of "Backfield in Motion" released in the UK. It was reviewed by the Record Mirror in the magazine's February 7, 1970 issue. James Hamilton gave it a positive review. At that time Swete's version was the only one available in the country, predating the Mel and Tim UK release.
- Jerry Walsh recorded three songs "Tu Me Enseñaste", "Hamacame" and "Sr. Sol, Sra.Luna" which appeared on the Los Mios, Los Tuyos, Los Preferidos De Todos various artists album which also included songs by Anthony Swete, Mark Juhns and Lois Shane. He also recorded a cover of The Beatles' song "Let It Be" which was released in Australia on Twin Hits RCA PPX-1012 in 1970. He recorded four songs for the PPX Singers Perform The Best Songs Of Saturday Night Fever and Bee Gees album that was released in 1978.

== Later years ==
According the March 10, 2015 article "CURTIS KNIGHT & THE SQUIRES Featuring JIMI HENDRIX – “Station Break” Streaming" by Brave Worlds, the recordings that Jimi Hendrix did for PPX and RSVP are part of his extraordinary legacy.

Ed Chalpin died in Boca Raton, Florida on 1 October 2019. He was surrounded by family which included his two daughters, a sister and several nieces and nephews. The funeral service was held on 6 October 2019 at Beth David Cemetery in Elmont, New York.
