= The Star You Wished Upon Last Night =

Song by Gisele MacKenzie with Richard Maltby and His Orch.
- Language: English
- Length: 2:22
- Label: Vik 4X-0233
- Songwriter(s): Jimmy McHugh - Buddy Kaye

"The Star You Wished Upon Last Night" was a song recorded by Gisele MacKenzie. It was released on the Vik label and became a hit for her in 1956. It was also recorded by Nick Noble and Jeannie Carson.

== Gisele MacKenzie version ==
=== Background ===
"The Star You Wished Upon Last Night" was composed by Jimmy McHugh and Buddy Kaye. It was backed with "It's Delightful to Be Married" by Anna Held and Vincent Scotto. Gisele Mackenzie sang lead on both sides, and the backing was provided by Richard Maltby and His Orchestra. The recordings were released on single, Vik 4X-0233 in October, 1956.

The single had a review in the This Week's Best Buys section of the November 24 issue of The Billboard. Since it was released it had made good progress, but in the last ten days prior to the review, it had gathered some great momentum. Saying that it could be a "dangerous" record, the good potential of the record was noted. The B side, "It's Delightful to Be Married" was getting good attention in some key cities.

=== Airplay ===
For the week of November 17, "The Star You Wished Upon Last Night" was at no. 9 on Johnny Micheals' playlist of WOKY in Milwaukee, Wisc. It was listed in the radio section of Tunes With Greatest Radio - TV Audience feature for the week of November 24. It was reported by The Billboard in the December 1 issue that was getting good radio coverage. It was shown in the December 15 issue of The Billboard that a survey of NBC affiliate stations for records receiving the most airplay showed the record was the top single in Detroit.

=== Juke box ===
The song was one of the top juke box records in Milwaukee as recorded by the December 15 issue of The Billboard.

=== Charts ===
On the week ending November 24, the record was at no. 9 in the Coming Up Strong section. On the week ending December 1, the song was at no. 8 on the Coming Up Strong chart in The Billboard.

It made it to no. 42 in the US main chart. The Top40Weekly website has it entering at no. 70 in the New This Week section for the week ending 31st October, 1956, and two weeks at no. 42 in the Power Hits section for the week ending 5th December, 1956.

== Nick Noble version ==
Nick Noble's version of "The Star You Wished Upon Last Night" was backed with "You Don’t Know What Love Is" and released on Mercury 70981 in 1956.

== Other versions ==
Jeannie Carson recorded a version of the song which was released on Decca 3113 in 1956.

Dickie Valentine recorded a version which was released in 1989.
