= Beth David Cemetery =

Jewish cemetery in Elmont, New York

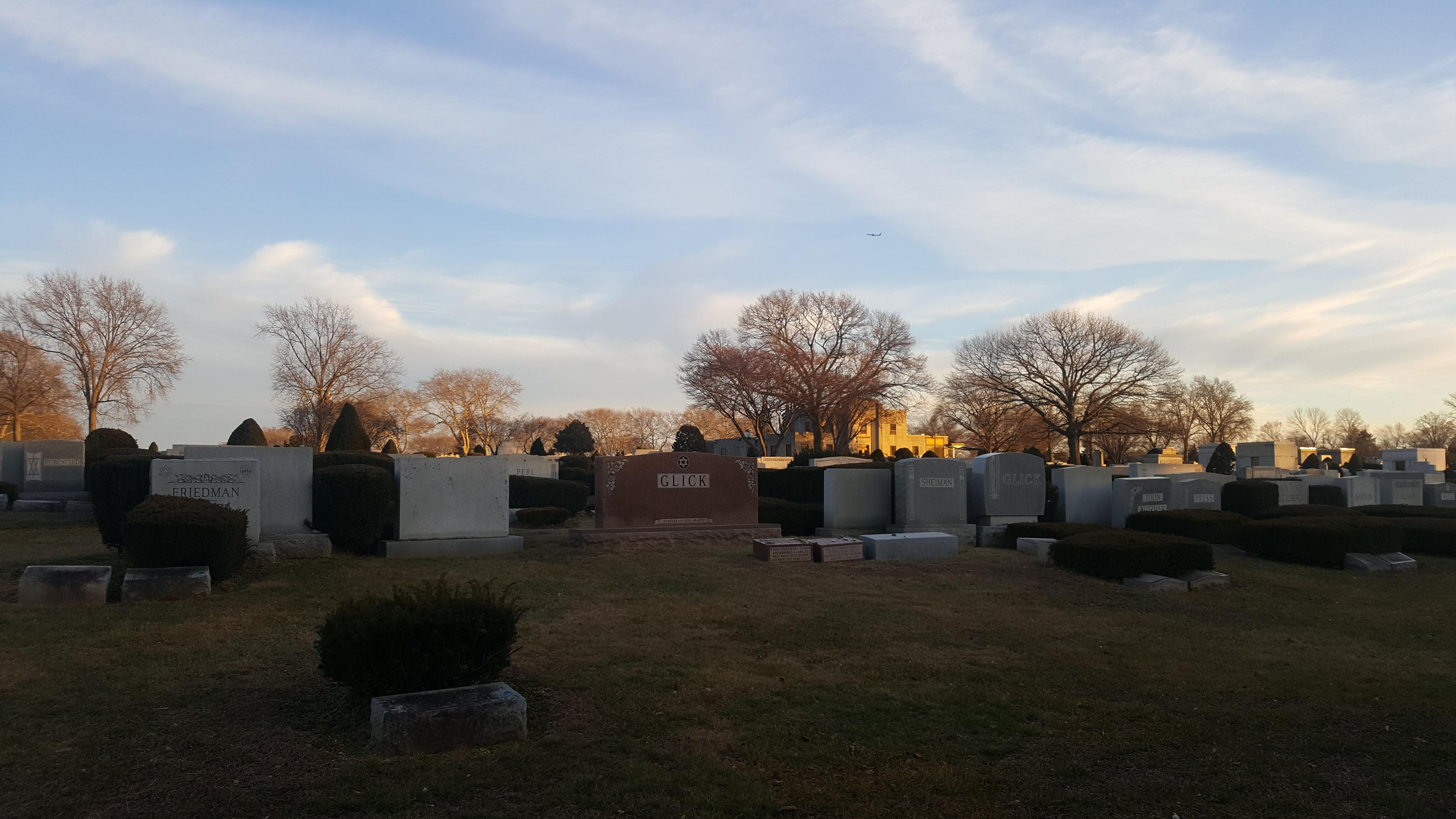
- Interactive map of Beth David Cemetery

Details
- Established: 1917 (109 years ago)
- Location: Elmont, New York
- Country: United States
- Coordinates: 40.6992°N 73.7062°W
- Type: Jewish
- Find a Grave: Beth David Cemetery

Beth David Cemetery is a Jewish cemetery located at 300 Elmont Road in Elmont, in Nassau County, New York, United States.

== Description ==
The cemetery was established in 1917. As of 2012, there were approximately 245,000 burials in the cemetery.

== Notable interments ==
- Iris Apfel (1921–2024), fashion designer
- Sam Ash (1897–1956), violinist and founder of Sam Ash Music
- Abe Axler (1901–1933), mobster
- Eduard Bloch (1872–1945), personal physician to the family of Adolf Hitler
- Rube Bloom (1902–1976), musician
- Dori Brenner (1946–2000), actress
- Joseph Brody (1877–1937), composer
- Joyce Brothers (1927–2013), psychologist
- Ed Chalpin (1935–2019), record executive and producer
- Barbara Craddock (1940–2005), dancer and choreographer
- Bill Creston (1932-2024), filmmaker
- Happy Foreman (1899–1953), baseball player
- Noah Greenberg (1919–1966), conductor
- Bernard Herrmann (1911–1975), composer
- Israel J. Hochman (1875–1940), bandleader and music arranger
- Sol Kaplan (1919–1990), composer
- Andy Kaufman (1949–1984), comedian and actor
- Martin Landau (1928–2017), actor
- Jay Larkin (1950–2010), television executive
- Sam Levenson (1911–1980), humorist
- Chuck Low (1928–2017), actor
- Sidney Lumet (1924–2011), film director
- Jackie Mason (1928–2021), comedian and actor
- Jack Newfield (1938–2004), journalist
- Mitchell Parish (1900–1993), lyricist
- Robert Plotnik (1943–2018), owner of "Bleecker Bob's" record shop
- Doc Pomus (1925–1991), musician
- Mnachem Risikoff (1866–1960), rabbi and scholar
- Saul Rogovin (1923–1995), baseball player
- Elyakim Rosenblatt (1933–2019), Orthodox rabbi
- Benjamin Stanley Rosenthal (1923–1983), politician
- Frank Russek (1875/1876-1948), businessman
- Aaron Schechter (1928–2023), Orthodox rabbi
- Walt Singer (1911–1992), football player
- Solomon Smulewitz (1866–1943), Yiddish vaudeville singer and songwriter
- Harry Strauss (1909–1941), mobster
- Herbert Tenzer (1905–1993), politician
- Abe Vigoda (1921–2016), actor
- Larry Wachtel (1930–2007), radio commentator
- Leibele Waldman (1907–1969), composer and actor
- Herman Wouk (1915–2019), author

== See also ==
- Montefiore Cemetery
- New Montefiore Cemetery
