= Hard to Get =

Hard to Get may refer to:

- "Hard to Get" (song), a 1955 song popularized by Gisele MacKenzie
- "Hard to Get", a song by Katy B from On a Mission
- "Hard to Get", a song by Starclub
- Hard to Get (1929 film), starring Jack Oakie
- Hard to Get (1938 film), featuring Olivia de Havilland, Dick Powell, and Bonita Granville
