= Royalty Exchange =

Royalty assets online commerce platform

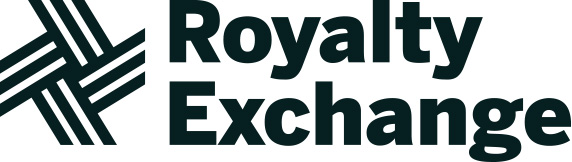
- Founded: 2011
- Website: www.royaltyexchange.com

Royalty Exchange is an American company that operates an online platform for buying and selling royalty assets of any type, mostly music, where royalty owners can sell their future payments to investors as alternative assets. The company hosts a centralized marketplace and online auction platform that connects a community of over 22,500+ investors with owners of royalty-based assets.

All types of assets can be monetized and invested in including music royalties, film royalties, and tax credits, patent and intellectual property royalties, trade secret royalties, renewable energy land leases, technology licensing royalties, book publishing royalties, franchise royalties, copyright royalties and agriculture royalties.

== History ==
Royalty Exchange was founded in 2011 in Raleigh, North Carolina. The founding team was led by Sean Peace (tech entrepreneur and CEO), Reggie Calloway (five-time Grammy-nominated songwriter/artist) and Wilson Owens (former band manager and digital marketing expert).

In October 2015, the company was acquired by a group of private investors, including new CEO Matthew Smith, and President & CFO Jeff Schneider. Additional investors include artist manager and concert promoter Bill Silva of Bill Silva Entertainment, as well as a group of alternative investment experts. The company is now based in Denver, CO.

In October 2017, Royalty Exchange became a member company of Techstars Music Accelerator.

On March 3, 2021, digital distributor Vydia announced that it would use Royalty Exchange's online marketplace to fund advances for its clients. On March 11, 2021, Anthony Martini was named CEO of Royalty Exchange. Former CEO Matthew Smith will remain with the company as a chairman.

== Notable auctions ==
- Frank Churchill: The first successfully completed online auction began on July 2 and closed on July 16, 2011. It included royalties of songwriter Churchill's catalog, including songs from Snow White and the Seven Dwarfs and Bambi.
- Kashif: Fifty percent of the R&B singer-songwriter and producer's writer share of public performance royalties, which sold for $156,000. His catalog includes the songs "Love Come Down" and "So Fine."
- Coolio: On August 28, 2013, American rapper Coolio auctioned the performance royalties of all his songs, including the #1 single "Gangsta's Paradise". Coolio used the proceeds to advance his career as a chef.
- Cheryl Cook: In July 2014, Cook auctioned all of her writer's share of public performance royalties, and accumulated royalty-produced assets from songs by Preston Glass. This asset sold for $26,000.
- Barry White: This asset sold for $73,000, consisting of 25% of Dennis Radcliffe's songwriting share of public performance royalties for the hit song “You're the First, the Last, My Everything.” The song was released by Barry White in 1974. It peaked at #1 on the Billboard Hot Soul Singles chart and #2 on the Billboard Hot 100 chart.
- Tony Geiss: In June 2017, the estate of Geiss, a songwriter for the children's television series Sesame Street, auctioned his royalties for $580,000 and donated the proceeds to several charity organizations.
- "See You Again": In July 2017, Jake Broido, a backup singer on Wiz Khalifa's #1 single "See You Again", auctioned off his digital performer royalties for the United States.
- King Lil G: In July 2017, MIH Entertainment put rapper King Lil G's sound recording royalties up for sale without King Lil G's knowledge. In January 2018, investor Ryan Stotland, who won the bidding for $420,000, sued Royalty Exchange for breach of contract. Stotland named Berklee College of Music professor Allen Bargfrede as an expert witness who concluded in his expert report that Royalty Exchange had acted negligently while performing due diligence on the catalog sale. On October 11, 2018, Judge Jackson denied Royalty Exchange's motion to dismiss. On March 7, 2019, Royalty Exchange paid an undisclosed amount of money to Stotland in order to settle the case out of court.
- Dickie Goodman: Goodman's son Jon sold the rights to the entire Goodman library on Royalty Exchange in July 2018, netting $13,000. The elder Goodman had committed suicide in 1989, and his library of "break-in" records was drawing $1,700 a year in royalties at the time of the auction; the younger Goodman sold the library in hopes of its new owners having the connections to give the library greater exposure.
- Dave Fortman: In April 2020, Dave Fortman placed his production royalties for Slipknot's 2008 album All Hope Is Gone and Simple Plan's self-titled album up for sale.
- Lil Dicky: In June 2021, Royalty Exchange announced its first NFT auction, which included music publishing royalties for "Save Dat Money" by rapper Lil Dicky.
- A Tribe Called Quest: In June 2021, Royalty Exchange sold 1.5% of A Tribe Called Quest's sound recording royalties from the group's first five albums as an NFT without their permission. Ali Shaheed Muhammad, one of the founding members of the group, stated that, "no member of A Tribe Called Quest has entered into any partnership with Royalty Exchange." A Tribe Called Quest previously disputed a hidden clause in their first record contract with Jive Records that had been negotiated by Ron Skoler and Ed Chalpin of PPX Enterprises, who represtened the rap group in 1989. That clause assigned a percentage of the recording fund to PPX each time the recording of a new record commenced. A Tribe Called Quest successfully sued when they learned of the clause but only after Jive Records provided support when the group committed to a recording an additional record with the label. "Apparently PPX sold their share of a settlement they made with Jive Records to an individual whom entered into a partnership with Royalty Exchange. Be clear that is the NFT that was created and auctioned," Muhammad stated.
- Shrek: In July 2021, North Star Media acquired a portion of the royalty stream to 643 compositions from the Shrek film franchise.

=== Royalty Flow ===
In September 2017, Royalty Exchange created a company called Royalty Flow, designed to acquire and hold royalty streams "of the world's biggest artists," starting with the Bass Brothers' production share of Eminem's 1999-2013 catalog. Royalty Flow filed with the SEC under Regulation A+ to raise between $11 million and $50 million to acquire the Eminem catalog from the producers who discovered and developed him—FBT Productions—as well as future catalogs. Those buying shares in Royalty Flow would have the right to collect dividends based on the performance of the Eminem catalog and any other catalogs acquired over time. The company intends to later list directly to the NASDAQ.

Royalty Flow was officially launched on November 27, 2017. On April 9, 2018, Royalty Exchange CEO Matt Smith canceled the IPO. He confirmed that the Nasdaq Stock Market revoked the company's conditional approval for listing on the exchange.

The Bass Brothers' stake has since been acquired by Shamrock Holdings.

== Private Syndicates ==
In June 2018, Royalty Exchange began offering Private Syndicate investments. Under Private Syndicates, Royalty Exchange creates Special Purpose Vehicles (SPV) designed to hold music catalogs. Accredited investors then buy shares of that entity, which grants them a proportional share of the royalty income it generates. Unlike auctions, there is no bidding. Investors can buy units in the Private Syndicate at fixed, known prices, and take the position size of their choice in each.

The first Private Syndicate closed was for the co-publishing share of Cage The Elephant's catalog.

The second Private Syndicate, which was announced in September 2018, involved the royalties to British rock band Dire Straits. This catalogue had earned nearly $300,000 in the twelve months before the auction.

== Multi-unit auctions ==
On August 7, 2014, Royalty Exchange had its multi-unit auction, a type of auction where the asset is securitized or divided into multiple units allowing for numerous buyers to bid on and win small or large amounts of the asset. The auction consisted of producer royalties for 11 tracks recorded and performed by the alternative rock band, 3 Doors Down.

== Acquisition and funding ==
In October 2015, the business was acquired and relocated to Denver, Colorado. As part of the acquisition, a new marketing/sales, legal, and operations team were put in place. In June 2017, the company raised $6.4 million in funding through a convertible note offering, more than double the $3 million it initially sought. The new funds were earmarked for new hires, new technology, and new product development.
