= Bob Rolontz =

Robert Rolontz (December 14, 1920 – June 14, 2000) was an American music journalist, executive and record producer.

He was born in Philadelphia, and studied at Columbia University. He started work in the record industry in Philadelphia, where his father owned local radio station WCAU. In 1951, he moved to New York and joined Billboard as a music reporter, writing a regular column on rhythm and blues. He joined RCA Victor in 1955 to manage its R&B subsidiary labels, Groove and Vik. Among the labels' biggest hits was Mickey & Sylvia's "Love Is Strange" in 1956, on which he was credited as producer. He also worked at Groove with Piano Red and Champion Jack Dupree, and was the first to use King Curtis on a recording session.

Rolontz returned to Billboard in 1958 as an associate editor, later promoted to music editor. In 1963, he wrote the book How To Get Your Song Recorded. He joined Atlantic Records in 1965, with responsibility for advertising and publicity, and was credited with inventing the "platinum disc", in order to publicize the success of Cream's album Wheels of Fire in selling 1 million copies. The concept was later accepted as an industry standard. In 1975, he became vice-president responsible for corporate public relations at Atlantic's parent company, Warner Communications. He was credited with persuading BMI and Rolling Stone to initiate the Ralph J. Gleason Music Book Awards in 1989.

He died in New York City in 2000, aged 79, after suffering from Parkinson's disease for 22 years.
