= Ed Chalpin =

American record producer, artist manager

- Also known as: Ed Chalpin, Ed Dantes
- Born: Edward Chalpin
- Died: October 1, 2019 (aged 84)
- Occupations: talent manager, record producer, record label owner
- Labels: PPX Enterprises, Inc., PPX, Disc-Trophy Records

Ed Chalpin (January 16, 1935 – October 1, 2019 ) was a record executive and producer. He is most remembered for his association with Curtis Knight and the Squires which caused problems for Jimi Hendrix throughout his career. Chalpin is responsible for the recordings from that period, some of which appear on You Can't Use My Name: The RSVP/PPX Sessions.

Originally from New York City, Chalpin began his career in the music business in 1956. He was referred to by Billboard as a pioneer producer of cover records. Chalpin was a producer of cover versions of Top 40 hits, released under the "Twin Hits" label. Today these would be regarded as Exploito releases. Up to 1966, a good deal of the records that his PPX Enterprises produced were cover versions. Around 25% of his cover recordings were overseas hits.

== Career ==
=== 1960s ===
Chalpin formed PPX Enterprises in 1961. In 1962, he had signed contracts with RCA Mexicana and Gamma Records to promote his pre-recorded tapes catalogue.

In 1964, "Summer In Sweden (Sabeline)" b/w "Endless Sleep" by The Spotnicks was released. Chalpin was the producer for both tracks. Also that year, he produced Mis Siete Novios for Vianey Valdez which was released on Eco Eco-262.

In 1965, he was the producer on "She Can Make Me Cry" b/w "I'll Be There" by Mark Richards. The PPX Studio single was released on ABC-Paramount 45-10654. "Memphis" by Bernd Spier was released on CBS and made it to number 1 in Germany.

In October 1965, Jimi Hendrix was introduced to Chalpin by Curtis Knight. Hendrix and Knight soon recorded a session for Chalpin, despite Hendrix having already signed a two-year deal with Sue Records in July 1965. Chalpin signed Hendrix to a 3-year recording contract and was given one dollar to make the contract legal. The sessions resulted in the first releases under Hendrix's own name. The act of signing the contract with Chalpin would be a cause of concern for Hendrix when he found fame in 1966, as he was still actually contracted to Chalpin.

In 1966, Billboard announced that Chalpin in partnership with Douglas "Jocko" Henderson from Philly radio station WHAT, was launching a new label called Chalco Records. The first release was to be "Suey" which featured Jayne Mansfield. The recording was made at Studio 76 aka Dimensional Sound, and it featured Hendrix on the instrumental backing. Around June 1968 Chalpin had signed up Rickie Mason, a Canadian singer who he referred to as a white James Brown and whom he would produce for the British Decca label In February 1969 Chalpin went to Argentina with Anthony Swete, who had scored his second Top Ten hit in the country with "Hold Me Tight".

=== 1970s ===
Chalpin produced the Curtis Knight solo album Down in the Village which was released in 1971 on Paramount Records PAS 5023. Some 47 years later Dave Segal of the Portland Mercury said that the album deserved "its own damn reissue". In 1971, Chalpin worked with Chubby Checker on a psychedelic album, which was released under a variety of titles including Slow Twistin' . In addition to the budget labels it was released on, the album was also released on London Records in 1971. In 2007 a CD of the album was released on the Underground Masters label with the title Chubby Checker Goes Psychedelic!!. In addition to crediting Chalpin as the producer, it included an extra track called "The Ballad of Jimi" which was also included on an earlier Chalpin production, the Jimi Hendrix & Curtis Knight album Get That Feeling.

It was announced in the May 12, 1973 edition of Billboard that Chalpin was now the manager of singer Jimmy Cliff and had signed deals with Warner Brothers and EMI. In 1975, Chalpin built Dimensional Sound, a recording studio in Manhattan on 54st off 8th ave. He continued his sound-a-like recordings. He also produced a "new" Jimi Hendrix album from old tapes featuring Hendrix on rhythm guitar. He hired Michael Toland to overdub lead guitar in the style of Hendrix. The rhythm section was Ronnie D'Addario on bass, and Charlie Scibetta on drums. Bob Halsal and Kim Stallings were the engineers. The Hendrix estate were not happy and eventually the album was pulled off the market. As of 1980, Chalpin was the owner of Dimensional Sound and Echo Studios, a 24-track facility in New York.

== PPX artists ==
The Hubs were a group of studio musicians who recorded instrumental cover versions for PPX. They also used the names The Downbeats and The Contrasts. One recording they did for PPX was "Memphis" which was on the B-side of "Ring of Fire" by Dan Gaynes.

Anthony Swete had chart success in Argentina during the 1960s with his versions of "Judy in Disguise (With Glasses)" and "Hold Me Tight". He also had top twenty success there with his Abrázame Fuerte album. Swete recorded "La La La (If I Had You)" b/w "Up on Cripple Creek" which was released on RCA Twin Hits PPX 1005. He also recorded his version of "Backfield in Motion" which was released in Australia on RCA 101882. A PPX production, it was released in the UK on RCA Victor RCA 1905 before the original hit was picked up for release.

It was noted by Billboard in the May 9, 1970 issue that three PPX artists – Curtis Knight, Ella Moore, and Anthony Swete – had signed with Paramount label. A more in-depth explanation of the deal was noted by Cash Box in their publication on the same date. Paramount had been going through a process of revamping, and the PPX artists were added to the Paramount roster as a result of a deal between Bill Gallagher of Famous Music (Paramount's parent company) and Ed Chalpin. Promo campaigns for the three artists were planned with Gallagher overseeing the process. Anthony Swete recorded on an album for the PPX label and contributed songs to the 1979 Roller Disco Dip album. The record was aimed at roller skating venues across the United States.

== Death ==
Ed Chalpin died in Boca Raton, Florida on October 1, 2019. He was surrounded by his two daughters, a sister, and several nieces and nephews. His funeral was held at October 6, 2019 at Beth David Cemetery in Elmont, New York.
