= Louis Waldman (disambiguation) =

Louis Waldman (1892–1982) was an American socialist politician.

Louis Waldman may also refer to:

- Louis A. Waldman, American art historian
- Louis "Leibele" Waldman (1907–1969), Jewish-American hazzan and composer
