= Abrázame Fuerte (album) =

Studio album by Anthony Swete
- Released: 1969
- Label: RCA
- Producer: Ed Chalpin

Anthony Swete chronology
Abrázame Fuerte (1969)	Anthony Swete (1970)

Abrázame Fuerte is a 1969 album by singer Anthony Swete that was released on the RCA label in Argentina. It contained Swete's hit singles "Judy in Disguise" and "Hold Me Tight". The album also made the top twenty in Argentina that year.

== Background ==
Anthony Swete was an artist who was signed to Ed Chalpin's PPX record label. His solo album, Abrazame Fuerte was released in Argentina on RCA GLE-80005 in 1969. As of March that year it was available. Swete had flown to Argentina with manager Chalpin in the previous month.

=== Singles ===
Swete's version of "Judy in Disguise" had got to no. 4 on the Buenos Aires Top Ten chart for the week ending 6 April, and "Hold Me Tight" had peaked at no. 5 on 15 March 1969 on the Argentina's Best Sellers chart.

== Reception ==
The album was reviewed in the March 3 issue of Crónica. It was reviewed again in the 23 June issue of Crónica. The reviewer wrote that "Abrázame Fuerte" ("Hold Me Tight") was a big seller in Argentina. It was also noted that the album would appeal to the younger people. The reviewer also wrote that song "Hold Me Tight" had the vibrant and explosive rhythm that was around at the time and combined with the melodic rhythm that was all the rage years ago. In addition to "Hold Me Tight", "Judy in Disguise" was named as one of the standout songs on the album.

== Commercial performance ==
It was noted in the April 29 issue of La Nación that Swete's album Abrazame Fuerte had made its debut at no. 17 on the Tops Long Plays chart. At that time, the single, "Abrázame fuerte" had moved down from 12 to 18 on the Tops Simples chart.

== Track listing ==
Side A

1. "Abrazame Fuerte" (Hold Me Tight), (J. Nash)
2. "Doblame, Modelame" (Bend Me, Shape Me), (English and Weiss)
3. "Joven, Tierna Y Maravillosa" (Young, Warm and Wonderful), (Tommy Knight)
4. "No Me Importa Lo Que Sepan" (I Don't Care Who Knows It), (Knight)
5. "Si Me Dejas" ("If You Let Me"), (Knight)
6. "Es Mi Nena" ("She's My Girl"), (Knight)

Side B

1. "Pequeñas Manzanas Verdes" (Little Green Apples), (B. Russell)
2. "¡Hola, Adios!", (Hello Goodby), (John Lennon-Paul McCartney)
3. "Judy Disfrazada" (Judy in Disguise), (J. Fred-A. Bernard)
4. "Estaré Allí" (I'll Be There), (Knight)
5. "Deseo Volcer a Casa" (I Wanna Come Home), (Knight)
6. "No Entiende" (They Don't Understand), (Knight)
