= Anthony Swete =

- Also known as: Knight 'En Day, Swete, Tommy Knight, Antonio Dulche
- Born: Tommy Wesley Knighton; May 10, 1942
- Died: May 24, 2017 (aged 75) New Jersey, United States
- Genres: Pop, soul, r&b
- Occupation: Singer
- Instrument: Voice
- Years active: 1960s, 1970s, ?
- Labels: Allied International, Clan Celentano, CRC, Disc-Trophy Records, Epic, F1 Team, Groove, Jonal Records, Paramount, PPX, RCA, RCA Victor, Variety, Zafiro
- Spouse: Annie Knighton

Anthony Swete was an American soul and pop singer who for a long time was associated with Ed Chalpin and his PPX record label. Recording in the 1960s and throughout the 1970s, he had a multitude of singles issued on a plethora of record labels. He also had albums released on the Clan Celentano, RCA and Zafiro labels. During his career, he had chart hits. Two of them, "Judy in Disguise" and "Hold Me Tight" were top ten hits in Argentina during the late 1960s.

== Background ==
Anthony Swete's real name of Tommy Wesley Knighton was revealed in both the 14 and 15 February 1969 issues of the Argentine newspaper Crónica. The 15 February article said that had a passion for rugby and politically seemed to be a Nixon supporter. He was born on 10 May 1942.

Swete started out in 1958 as a 15-year-old in a night club in America's South, filling in for the singer who was unwell on that day. In the beginning he had a vagabond kind of lifestyle and earned little money. Along the way he also learned to play piano in order to accompany himself. At some stage he met a girl on the music scene who would become his wife. This curtailed his wandering lifestyle, and he headed to the music scene in New York in pursuit of success.

He became an artist signed to the PPX label. This label had at various times signed Jimmy Cliff, Jimi Hendrix, Curtis Knight and Ella Moore.

He was listed by Cash Box in the December 28, 1968 issue as one of the artists that made the Argentina Top Ten that year. In addition to the chart success he had in Argentina with "Judy in Disguise" and "Hold Me Tight", his album also made the top twenty. When he was in Argentina, he was also referred to as Antonio Dulche.

In the early 1970s via PPX, he was signed to the Paramount label.

Both Anthony Swete (Tommy Knighton) and his wife Annie P. Knighton used the pseudonyms Tommy Knight and Ann Knight for the songs they composed.

== Career ==
=== 1968 ===
==== "Judy Disfrazada" a.k.a. Judy in Disguise ====
Anthony Swete recorded his version of "Judy in Disguise". It was released in Argentina as "Judy Disfrazada". The B side was the Scott English and Larry Weiss composition "Doblame, Modelame" ("Bend Me, Shape Me"). The recordings were released on Groove GS-8005 in 1968. As shown by Cash Box in the 16 March issue, Swete's version debuted at no. 10 on the Argentina's Best Sellers chart. It peaked at no. 5 on the Cash Box Argentina's Best Sellers chart for the week of 20 April. It was still in the chart at no. 17 on 25 May. As shown by Billboard, it was at no. 4 on the Buenos Aires Top Ten chart for the week ending April 6.

=== 1969 ===
Swete would have more success in Argentina in 1969 which would take him to the Latin American country.

==== "Abrazame fuerte" a.k.a. "Hold Me Tight ====
Anthony Swete reciorded "Hold Me Tight" which was released as "Abrazame Fuerte" on Groove GS-8015. As recorded by Cash Box, the single was at no. 5 on the Argentina's Best Sellers chart for the week of 25 January. The 9 February issue of La Nación had "Abrazame fuerte" at no. 4 in the Tops en Otra Banda chart. It had moved down from no. 3. According to the 15 March issue of Cash Box, the song would eventually reach the peak position of no. 5 on the Best Sellers chart. The 20 April issue of La Nación had "Abrazame fuerte" moving down six places from no. 12 to 18 on the Tops Simples chart.

==== Further activities ====
Anthony Swete's pending arrival in Argentina was mentioned in the 13 February issue of Crónica, that he was to arrive on Aerolíneas Argentinas Flight 301. According to the article, in addition to appearances on television, Swete's personal appearances were to be exclusively at Carlos Ballón's Escala Musical venues. It was reported in the 15 February 1969 issue of Crónica that Swete, known for the hits "Judy in disguise" and "Hold Me tight" had come to Argentina with his manager Ed Chalpin. He had actually arrived the day before on the 9:10 plane at the Ezeiza international airport and was to appear at a concert with The Tremeloes. The 25 February issue of Crónica wrote that Swete, who came for a concert at the Hermitage had problems in understanding Spanish. The concierge at the hotel put him in the picture about the disc jockeys in the city. He didn't realize that they were up to date with the music, and they were from venues other than radio.

==== Abrazame Fuerte album ====
Swete recorded the album Abrazame Fuerte that was released in Argentina on RCA GLE-80005. By March 1969 it was available.

It was noted in the 29 April issue of La Nación that Swete's album Abrazame Fuerte had made its debut at no. 17 on the Tops Long Plays chart. Meanwhile the single, "Abrázame fuerte" had moved down from 12 to 18 on the Tops Simples chart.

According to the 23 June issue of Crónica, "Abrázame Fuerte" ("Hold Me Tight") was a big seller in Argentina. His album was also reviewed in the issue. The reviewer noted the album's youth appeal value. The album had actually been reviewed in an earlier issue of Crónica, the 3 March issue.

==== Further activities ====
According to the 5 May 1969 issue of Crónica, a various artists record featuring Swete Jack Ritt, R. U. Fine, Mark Juhns and Lois Shane was being released in Argentina on RCA. An album Los Mios, Los Tuyos, Los Preferidos De Todos which was released in Argentina on RCA's Groove series (cat# RCA GLP-80007) was reviewed in the 25 August issue of Crónica. Swete covered the songs "Gente Cotidiana", "Veinticinco Millas" and "Dame, Dame Buen Amor". The album also included songs by Jerry Walsh with "Tu Me Enseñaste", "Hamacame" and "Sr. Sol, Sra.Luna", Lois Shayne with "Hijo De Un Predicador" and "Muevete Un Poco Mas Cerca", Joe Moss with "Tengo Una Idea De Ti", Dan Sona with "Galveston" and Mark Juhns with "Dulce Vino De Cereza" and "Cesped Grande".

At some stage, an album Discotequeando En El Safari Club was released in Venezuela on the Orbe label. This various artists album had songs such as "The Horse" by The Foundations", "Bang-Shang-A-Lang" by Young Blood, "Sweet Blindness" by Billi Sapphire, "Just Beyond Your Smile" by Jackie Trent & Tony Hatch, "White Room" by R. U. Fine, "Run to the Door" by Clinton Ford, "I've Gotta Get a Message to You" by John Clark, "Colours" by Donovan, "Encore" by John Clark, "The Na Na Song" by The Ferris Wheel, "Red Red Wine by "Jimmy James & the Vagabonds" and "Little Green Apples" by Swete.

=== 1970s ===
Swete recorded his version of "Backfield in Motion" which saw a release in the UK. It was reviewed by the Record Mirror in the magazine's February 7, 1970 issue. It did get a positive review with James Hamilton calling it a nicely dated beater with soulful Sam & Dave touches. At the time Swete's version was the only one available in the country, predating the Mel and Tim UK release. Backed with "Yester Me, Yester You, Yesterday" by Pip Bravo, the single had a release in New Zealand on Allied International PPX 302. Also in 1970, a single was released on the RCA Twin Hits label featuring his versions of "My Honey and Me" bw "Rainy Night in Georgia".

According to Cash Box in the magazine's May 9, 1970 issue, Swete along with Curtis Knight and Ella Moore were to have releases in the near future on the Paramount label. They were to be promoted under the wing of Bill Gallagher of Famous Music. With Knight's album Down in the Village already released, Swete and Moore were to have their recordings released in the near future.

He composed the song "Is it Good to You" which was registered in the first half of 1974. It was credited to his pseudonym Tommy Knight.

In July 1978 and now going by the name Swete, he was set to record a disco album that would be played at roller skating rinks around the US. The music which would be a mixture of Top 40 and disco would feature Swete backed by a band whose identity hadn't yet been disclosed. The record was to be played at intervals at the skating rinks. It seems in that period, Swete was also going by the name of Knight 'En Day. It was reported by Billboard in the magazine's May 19, 1979 issue that 30,000 copies of the single "Disco Dip" had been sold from 25 skating rinks. The singles were not for general sale via the traditional venues. They were to be sold at the skating rinks. Also that year or 1979, an album Roller Disco Dip, credited to Laura Lee Mann, Gina Rotchschild, Ron Booker, Anthony Swete, Curtis Knight was released. The credited composers of the songs that Anthony Swete performed, "Disco Dating" and " Skating on My Birthday" were Ann Knight, Ed Dantes, Tommy Knight. It's more than likely that Ann Night is his wife Ann Knighton, Ed Dantes is Ed Chalpin, and Tommy Knight is Tommy Knighton (Swete).

== Death ==
Anthony Swete a.k.a. Tommie W. Knighton died on 24 May 2017.

His wife Ann Knighton died on 13 April 2024.

== Later years ==
"Backfield In Motion" was on Netti Page's playlist in March 2011 as part of the New Zealand Soul Weekender.

Swete's version of "Doblame, Moldeame" was included on the I Love Latin, Vol. 94 compilation that was released in 2023.

== Discography ==
Singles (selective)
Act	Release	Catalogue	Year	Notes
Anthony Swete	"Judy Disfrazada" (Judy in Disguise) / "Doblame, Modelame" (Bend Me Shape Me)	Groove GS-8005	1968	
Anthony Swete	"Abrazame Fuerte" (Hold Me Tight) / "Pequeñas Manzanas Verdes" (Little Green Apples)	CRC 8235	1969	Chile release
Anthony Swete Mark Juhns	"Backfield in Motion" / "Make Believe"	RCA Victor 101882	1969	
Anthony Swete	"Backfield in Motion / "Soul Deep"	RCA Victor	1970	UK release
Anthony Swete	"My Honey and Me" / "Rainy Night in Georgia"	RCA Twin Hits PX 1005	1970	Aust. release
Anthony Swete	"The Letter" / "If You Let Me"	Clan Celentano BF ES 93	1970	Italy release
Anthony Swete	"Disco Dip" / "Skating on My Birthday"	F1 Team P 508	1978	Italy

EPs (selective)
Act	Release	Tracks	Catalogue	Year	Notes
Anthony Swete		A. "Abrazame Fuerte" ("Hold Me Tight"), "A Lo Que Juega La gente" ("Games People Play"); B. "Gente Cotidiana" ("Everyday People"), "Cuida Tus Deberes" ("Take Care of Your Homework")	RCA Victor GE-30002	1968	
Anthony Swete, Jerry Walsh		A. a) "Gimme, Gimme Good Lovin", b) "Rock Me"; B. c) "Twenty Five Miles", d) "Mr. Sun, Mr. Moon"		1968	a, c) Anthony Swete b, d) Jerry Walsh

Albums
Act	Release	Catalogue	Year	Notes
Anthony Swete	Abrázame Fuerte	RCA GLE-80005	1968 / 1969	
Anthony Swete	Anthony Swete	Clan Celentano BF ES LP 7021	1970	
Laura Lee Mann, Gina Rotchschild, Ron Booker, Anthony Swete, Curtis Knight	Roller Disco Dip	Zafiro ZL-293	1978, 1979	

Various artists compilation appearances
Title	Track	Catalogue	Year	Notes
The Now Sounds	"My Honey and Me"	Cornwall Records, Inc. – LG 101	1970	United States
The Now Sounds	"Rainy Night in Georgia"	Cornwall Records, Inc. – LG 102	1970	United States
Sound Spectacular Volume 1	"Twenty Five Miles, "Gimme Good Lovin'"	RCA Camden CAM-141		Australia
Sound Spectacular Volume 2	"Love is All You Have to Give"	RCA Camden CAMS 142		Australia
Golden Hits	"Games People Play", "Gimme Gimme Good Lovin'", "Spinning Wheel"	King Size M.R.E TE 001		Holland
U.S. Charts Breakers	"Backfield In Motion"	Stateside 2C 054-91.105		France
