= Jay Larkin =

American entertainment executive (1950–2010)

Jay Larkin (October 23, 1950 – August 9, 2010) was a television boxing and entertainment executive. During his more than twenty years with the cable network Showtime, from 1984 to 2005, Larkin created and produced such programs as Showtime Championship Boxing and ShoBox as a pay-per-view sports phenomenon, rising from publicist to senior vice president and executive producer en route to becoming one of the most powerful successful persons in the television boxing business, promoting major boxing events. Larkin also brought MMA to television, but was less successful.

== Childhood and education ==
Born into a Long Island Jewish family, Larkin held degrees in theatre and directing from C.W. Post College, Long Island University, Boston Conservatory of Music, and the School of Theatre, Film and Television at University of California at Los Angeles.

== Boxing and MMA promotion ==
Mike Tyson, Evander Holyfield, Lennox Lewis, Marvin Hagler, Sugar Ray Leonard, Julio César Chávez, and Félix Trinidad were among the boxers whose bouts Larkin promoted. His biggest fights were Tyson-Holyfield I in 1996, Tyson-Holyfield II in 1997 (a record $100,000,000 revenue night), and Tyson-Lewis in 2002. He was fired due to Showtime network job cutbacks in November 2005. He followed as president in 2007–2008 of the now defunct mixed martial arts promotion International Fight League. Larkin's venture in MMA was a televised first and a failure. The IFL promotion was the first to be on broadcast TV in 2007 when it signed a deal with MyNetworkTV. IFL lost nearly $36,000,000 in its brief two years of existence in competition with UFC.

== Showtime pay-per-view concerts ==
Larkin was involved in marketing, distribution and production of such artists as Paul McCartney, Eric Clapton, Sting, The Rolling Stones, Elton John, Liza Minnelli, Stevie Wonder, Frank Sinatra, Jay-Z, Gloria Estefan, Spice Girls, and Backstreet Boys.

== Showtime comedy specials and documentaries ==
Larkin worked with such celebrities on Showtime as Tim Allen, Ellen DeGeneres, Drew Carey, Jon Stewart, Dave Chappelle, Denis Leary and many others. He was executive producer on Broadway of Mario Cantone's Tony-nominated Laugh Whore.

== Death ==
Larkin died in Nyack Hospital in Nyack, New York of a brain tumor on August 9, 2010. He was diagnosed in April 2007, and maintained a correspondence with New York Yankee Bobby Murcer, who was in a similar situation and predeceased him. Larkin was buried in Beth David Cemetery in Elmont, New York. He was survived by his wife Lisa and their two sons. Before he died, Larkin stated Nigel Benn versus Gerald McClellan was his most painful moment as a promoter.
