= Lovedrops =

"Baby You're So Fine"

Single by Mickey & Sylvia
- Released: 1961
- Label: Willow

Mickey & Sylvia singles chronology
"What Would I Do" (1960)	"Baby You're So Fine" (1961)	"Baby You're So Fine" (1961)

"Lovedrops" is a song written by S. Robinson and M. Baker. The song was originally recorded by the American R&B duo, Mickey & Sylvia, who are best known for their 1957 single, "Love Is Strange". Mickey & Sylvia's version of "Lovedrops" was released in 1961 as the B-side of "Baby You're So Fine".

It was also recorded in June 1966 by the Canadian group Barry Allen & The Rebels (credited as "Barry Allen") and released as a single. The record peaked at #4 on the CHUM chart, stayed in the Top 10 for over three months, and eventually went gold. The success of this single earned Allen the award of "Top Male Vocalist" of 1966 in Canada. Their version was recorded in Clovis, New Mexico with record producer Norman Petty, who encouraged the group to record the song in the highest key they could sing it in.

Shawn Nagy's "Super Oldies" label has reissued Barry's recording on CD in original mono and new stereo forms.
