= Starting All Over Again (Mel and Tim song) =

Single by Mel and Tim

from the album Starting All Over Again
- B-side: "It Hurts to Want It So Bad"
- Released: July 1972
- Genre: Pop
- Length: 3:49 (single version) 4:07 (album version)
- Label: Stax Records
- Songwriter: Phillip Mitchell
- Producers: Barry Beckett, Roger Hawkins

Mel and Tim singles chronology
"Good Guys Only Win in the Movies" (1970)	"Starting All Over Again" (1972)	"I May Not Be What You Want" (1973)

"Starting All Over Again" is a 1972 song by the cousin duo Mel and Tim. It is the title track of their second LP. It was their second and final top 40 hit in the U.S. and Canada. It peaked at number 19 on the Billboard Hot 100, spending five months on the American charts. On the R&B chart, the song peaked at number 4.

The cousins performed "Starting All Over Again" on Soul Train on March 17, 1973. They appeared on the show along with Al Green.

== Chart history ==
=== Weekly charts ===
Mel and Tim

Chart (1972)	Peak position
Canada RPM Top Singles	27
New Zealand (Listener)	16
U.S. Billboard Hot 100	19
U.S. Billboard R&B	4
U.S. Cash Box Top 100	18

== Hall & Oates version ==
"Starting All Over Again" was covered by American duo Hall & Oates in 1990 on the album Change of Season. Released as a single in 1991, their version reached number 11 on the Canadian Adult Contemporary chart and number 10 on the U.S. Adult Contemporary chart during summer of that year.

=== Charts ===
Chart (1991)	Peak position
Canada RPM Adult Contemporary	11
Canada RPM Top 100	14
US Billboard Adult Contemporary	10

==== Year-end charts ====
Chart (1991)	Rank
Canada RPM Adult Contemporary	80

== Other versions ==
- David Lindley, in 1985.
- Bobby Bland, in 1992.
- Israel "Iz" Kamakawiwo'ole, on the final album before his death, N Dis Life, released in 1996.
- "Starting All Over Again" was the title track of Paul Jones' 2009 album and it featured Eric Clapton on guitar.
