= La golondrina =

1862 Mexican song

Song
- Language: Spanish
- English title: "The Swallow"
- Written: 1862
- Genre: Folk
- Songwriter: Narciso Serradell Sevilla

"La golondrina" (English: "The Swallow") is a song written in 1862 by Mexican physician Narciso Serradell Sevilla (1843–1910), who at the time was exiled to France due to the French intervention in Mexico.

The lyrics come from a poem written in Arabic by the last Abencerrages king of Granada, Aben Humeya, in a translation by Niceto de Zamacois, which Serradell found in a magazine used as packing material. They use the image of a migrating swallow to evoke sentiments of longing for the homeland. It became the signature song of the exiled and expatriate Mexicans.

== Spanish recordings ==
The song was notably recorded by Señor Francisco in 1906. In 1948, Gene Autry sang the song in his Cinecolor film The Big Sombrero. Other recorded versions include:

- Chet Atkins (1955, guitar instrumental)
- Caterina Valente (1959)
- Nat King Cole (1962)
- Plácido Domingo (1984)
- Flaco Jiménez (1992, instrumental)
- Caetano Veloso (1994)
- Guadalupe Pineda (2004).

== She Wears My Ring ==
Felice & Boudleaux Bryant wrote lyrics in English, as "She Wears My Ring", which was first recorded by Jimmy Sweeney (also known as Jimmy Bell) in 1960. Other notable cover versions are by:

- Roy Orbison (1962)
- Johnny O'Keefe (1964)
- Ray Price (1968)
- Elvis Presley (1973).

=== Solomon King recording ===
Solomon King recorded the song in 1968 and it became an instant international hit.

==== Charts ====
Chart (1968)	Peak position
Ireland (IRMA)	13
New Zealand (Listener)	17
UK Singles (The Official Charts Company)	3

== Recordings in other languages ==
The song, recorded in German by 13-year-old Heintje as "Du sollst nicht weinen" ("Thou Shalt Not Cry"), became a number-one hit in August 1968 in West Germany.

=== Anita Hegerland version ===
In June 1970, the 9-year-old Norwegian singer Anita Hegerland became a famed child singer with the Swedish-language recording "Mitt sommarlov" ("My Summer Break") that topped the Swedish best selling chart Kvällstoppen for five weeks and Svensktoppen for seven weeks as well as the Norwegian singles chart for three weeks. At age 10, she became Norway's first artist to sell over a million copies and she now is one of the best-selling solo singers in Norway, with sales of more than 7 million albums and singles. Hegerland's songs have been released on nearly 30 million albums worldwide, most of which are with Roy Black and Mike Oldfield.

==== Charts ====
Chart (1970)	Peak positions
Finland (Suomen virallinen lista)	15
Norway (VG-lista)	1
Sweden (Kvällstoppen)	1
Sweden (Svensktoppen)	1

== In popular culture ==
- The song figures prominently in the 1969 film The Wild Bunch, directed by Sam Peckinpah and scored by Jerry Fielding. The local people serenade the bandit protagonists with it as they leave Angel's Mexican village.
