= Barbara Rosenthal =

American photographer and novelist (born 1948)

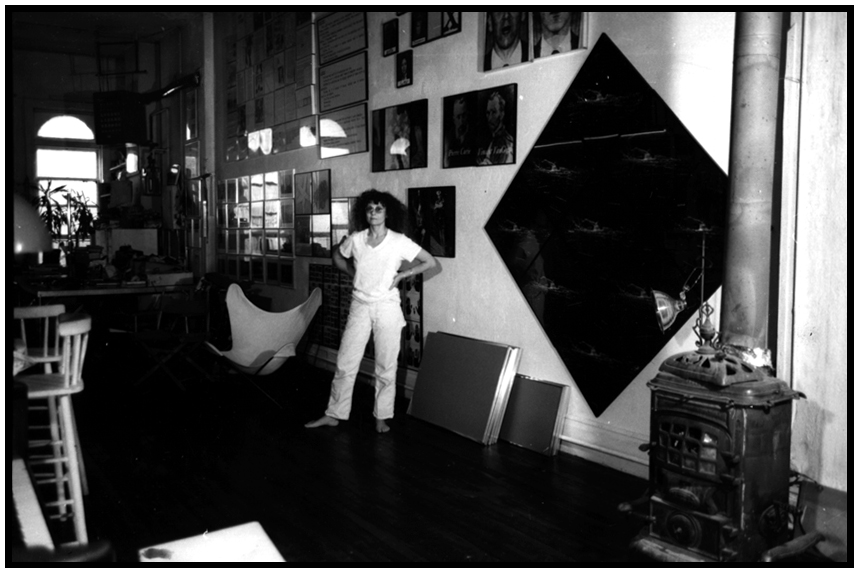
- Barbara Rosenthal, 1990
- Born: Barbara Ann Rosenthal; 1948 (age 77–78); The Bronx, New York
- Education: Brooklyn Museum Art School; Art Students League; Carnegie-Mellon University; Tyler School of Art in Rome; New York University Institute of Art History; City University of New York
- Known for: Avant-garde art, writing, performance, photography
- Notable work: Journal: Volumes 1-71; Homo Futurus; Surreal Photography; Conceptual Photography; Provocation Cards; Existential Cartoons

Barbara Ann Rosenthal (born 1948) is an American avant-garde and conceptual artist, writer, and performance artist. She is known for her interdisciplinary and existential works.

Rosenthal's multimedia work combines X-rays, brain scans, and text drawn from journals and the clothing she wears. Her work often explores existential themes and has been noted for its philosophical underpinnings. In 2021, her archives were acquired by Queens College.

She has used pseudonyms such as "Homo Futurus," the title of one of her books, and "Cassandra-on-the-Hudson," which reference themes in her creative work. In 2022, she trademarked "Homo Futurus."

Rosenthal lives and works in the Greenwich Village neighborhood of New York City.

== Early life ==
Barbara Rosenthal was born in The Bronx in 1948.

At the age of 11, Rosenthal wrote a weekly column for her town newspaper, The Franklin Square Bulletin.

== Education and early career ==
Rosenthal started her education at the Brooklyn Museum Art School in 1963, where she studied figure drawing and painting with instructor Isaac Soyer. From 1964-1966, she continued her education at the Art Students League.

She later attended Carnegie Mellon University, where she earned her BFA in painting in 1970. During her sophomore and senior years, she was the editor of the literary art magazine Patterns. She spent her junior year studying abroad at Temple University's Tyler School of Art in Rome, Italy, studying art and art history.

She earned an MFA in painting from Queens College in 1974.

During her years as an art student and teacher, Rosenthal supplemented her earnings as an assembly-line painting artist and a go-go dancer at clubs, including Metropole Cafe and Club Mardi Gras. She also worked as a stringer photojournalist for The Village Voice, East Village Eye, and The New York Post. From 1972 to 1974, she taught at the Lakeside School in Seattle, Washington.

== Academic career ==
Rosenthal's first college teaching position was as a painting instructor at Stephens College, Columbia, Missouri, in 1976-1977. Since 1990, Rosenthal has taught writing as an adjunct lecturer at the College of Staten Island of The City University of New York. Rosenthal has also taught studio art and art history at other colleges in New York. She also taught as an Adjunct Assistant Professor of Photography at Nassau Community College in 1994.

== Writing ==
As a writer, Barbara Rosenthal produces short- and long-form works, including poetry, novels, art criticism, and essays. Her fiction, like her visual art, tends to present a grim worldview, depicting surreal surroundings in which a lone individual faces incomprehensible situations. Rosenthal is a regular contributor to NY Arts Magazine and is known for her stand against art as advocacy, which she labels "retrograde." She says that she opposes many prevailing political, cultural, and feminist trends in contemporary art.

In 1982, Rosenthal became an associate member of the Women's Institute For Freedom of the Press, Washington, DC.

== Performance ==
Rosenthal's performance art has utilized installation, projections, voice, music, and abstract sound to convey themes of individuality, identity, and time.

Her first performance/installation, "Self-Portrait Room," was performed in 1968. From 1976 to 1984, she performed in videos by placing a stationary camera in front of a single-action life situation. Rosenthal's ventriloquism video, How Much Does The Monkey Count, was made in 1988 and was reprised at CBGB in 1991 and the Living Theater in 1992.

From 1976 to 1996, she was the leading female actor in the Super-8 films by Bill Creston. Seven other films produced by Rosenthal were also screened at The Museum of Modern Art in 1989.

In 2005, Rosenthal crashed the Performa05 Festival in NY with Existential Interact wearing her image-text "Button Pin Shirts" and handing out Provocation Cards in front of the Guggenheim Museum and White Box Gallery in New York. This interaction was performed at various iconic street locations across several cities in the United States and abroad. She represented the United States in both performance and text-based art at the Tina B. Prague Contemporary Art Festival in 2009 and 2010.

Rosenthal’s project Existential Interact was featured in a full-page spread in the 2011 issue of Emergency Index, an annual documentation of performance art. In 2013, Rosenthal began including video morphs in her work, beginning in I’m Growing Up, which was performed at Grace Exhibition Space in Brooklyn and at AudioPollen in Brisbane, Australia.

== Photography ==
Rosenthal is noted for her photography. From 1978 to 1988, she also worked as a photojournalist at New York newspapers including The New York Post and the Village Voice. Until 2005, she exclusively shot in black and white, which she hand-processed and printed in her darkroom. Since 2006, she has also worked with color film, continuing to hand-process black and white film while sending the color film to a commercial lab. However, she scans and digitally prints both types of negatives.

Her work is most often shown in art galleries. In the past few years, she has had solo or two-person photography shows in several locations across the globe. Additionally, about 200 of her Surreal Photographs have been published by Visual Studies Workshop Press in offset books.

== Video ==
Since 1976, Rosenthal has made over 100 videos. She has worked in different formats as the technology has changed, including 1/2" open reel, 3/4-Umatic, VHS, mini-DV, and HD.

The first works, The Haircut and The Bath, began with 1/2" open reel portapak partnering with Bill Creston. In 1982, she won a Festival Prize for Helen Webster: Cancer and Self-Discovery at the Global Village Video Festival in New York. In 1988, her videos Leah Gluck: Victim of the Twins Experiments and Women in the Camps were shown in the installation at The Jewish Museum, New York.

Besides partnering in New York and Missouri with Bill Creston in her early videos, as well as his films, she has partnered in Berlin, Germany with DJ RoBeat for several of her videos and live performances since 2008.

== Art philosophy ==
In 1992 Rosenthal said that many "dictums ... guide [her] production: that pattern serve as color; that as few materials are used as possible; that as little space is used as possible … that it engages a viewer differently from separate vantages; that it reaches several centers of the psyche simultaneously; so a viewer is left with room to freely associate; that mystery is always present; that it does not advocate; that it does not mimic past successes … that it be available to everyone and that it be both produced and priced at lowest possible cost."

== Major collections ==
The largest holdings of Rosenthal's works in Europe are at Artpool Art Research Center and the Tate Britain Library, London, England. The largest American holdings of her work are in The Dadabase Collection of The Museum of Modern Art and The Whitney Museum of American Art. Her archives, including over one hundred volumes of workbooks and Journals and fifty drafts of her unpublished novel, "Wish For Amnesia", are currently housed at eMediaLoft.org, NYC and bequeathed to the Special Collections of the Hunt Library at Carnegie-Mellon University upon her death.

== Grants, honors, and awards ==
In 2013, Barbara Rosenthal received participation in the New Museum's XFR-STN Transfer Station media archiving project.

In 2006, Rosenthal received an Artist's Residency from the Red Gate Gallery, in Beijing. Other residencies include: Visual Studies Workshop Press, Rochester, NY in 2000; Amiga Computer Video Imaging Residency Grant at Adaptors/Brooklyn, NY, in 1996; Electronic Arts Grant Video Residency, Experimental TV Center, Owego, NY in 1989, 1990 and 1991; Harvestworks Audio-Video Residency, NYC in 1988; and Video Arts Residency at Real Art Ways, Hartford, CT in 1988.

Rosenthal's monetary awards have included a Media Presentation Grant from Experimental TV Center, Owego, NY in 2000; Finishing Funds from Film Bureau in NYC 1991; a New York State Council on the Arts Video Facility Subsidy Grant at Margolis/Brown Adaptors, Brooklyn, NY in 1998; a Finishing Funds Grant from Media Bureau/The Kitchen in NYC, in 1988; three Artists Space/Artists Grants in NYC 1986, 89 and 90; and a Creative Arts for Public Service C.A.P.S. Grant in Video, New York State, in 1984.

Rosenthal received a Medal of Honor from the Brussels Ministry of Culture, Brussels, Belgium, in 1990. Rosenthal received a Global Village Documentary Festival Award in NYC in 1983. She has been listed as a Fiction Writer, Poet, and Spoken Word Artist by Poets & Writers, NYC, since 1986. She was elected membership in Pi Delta Epsilon National Publications Honor Society, USA, in 1970.

== Selected works ==
=== Books ===
- Clues to Myself, Visual Studies Workshop Press, Rochester, NY, 1981 ISBN 0-89822-015-7
- Homo Futurus, Visual Studies Workshop Press, Rochester, NY, 1986 ISBN 0-89822-046-7
- Sensations, Visual Studies Workshop Press, Rochester, NY, 1984 ISBN 0-89822-022-X
- Soul & Psyche, Visual Studies Workshop Press, Rochester, NY, 1998 ISBN 0-89822-121-8
- Weeks (collaboration with poet Hannah Weiner), Xexoxial Endarchy, Madison, WI, 1990

=== Pamphlets and saddle-stitched books ===
- Existential Cartoons, L-Gallery of Contemporary Art, Moscow, Russia, 2007
- Catalogue Raisonné, The Museum of Modern Media, NYC, 2007
- Children's Shoes, eMediaLoft.org, NYC, 1992
- Introduction to the Trilogy, eMediaLoft.org, NYC, 1985
- Names/Lives, eMediaLoft.org, NYC, 2001
- Old Address Book, eMediaLoft.org, N.Y.C., 1984
- Structure And Meaning, eMediaLoft.org, NYC, 1981
