= Robert Plotnik =

American lawyer

Robert Edward Plotnik
- Born: August 28, 1943; Baltimore, Maryland, U.S.
- Died: November 29, 2018 (aged 75); New York City
- Other names: Bleecker Bob
- Occupation: Business owner
- Known for: Record shop
- Notable work: Bleecker Bob's Golden Oldies

Robert Edward Plotnik (August 28, 1943 – November 29, 2018), also known as Bleecker Bob, was the owner of an eponymous record shop first located on Bleecker Street in Manhattan, New York. He became a legend in the music industry and his store was a landmark in Greenwich Village, known for its selection of rare records. Often viewed as eccentric, he formed friendships with many celebrities. Members from bands like Led Zeppelin, Eric Clapton, David Bowie and the Clash would frequent his shop looking for old records.

Plotnik was noted for recognizing changes in music, and his store was at the forefront of emerging rock genres, such as punk rock, where he offered hard-to-find British and American records. Joey Ramone of the punk rock band the Ramones, said, "Bleecker Bob's has everything." This often required him to import records from overseas that were not available in the United States. Many rock stars were patrons of his shop, and Plotnik would often jeer them while in his store. Guitarist Lenny Kaye met Patti Smith while he was working for Plotnik at Village Oldies.

The wisecracking Plotnik and his shop were featured on a 1993 episode of Seinfeld, titled "The Old Man".

== Bleecker Bob's Golden Oldies ==
Plotnik opened Village Oldies with his partner Al Trommers in September 1967 at 149 Bleecker Street. Shortly afterwards, Trommers gave Plotnik the nickname "Bleecker Bob". In the 1970s, the shop moved to MacDougal Street, just below 8th Street. Village Oldies specialized in vintage rhythm and blues records. In 1981, Plotnik moved it to 118 West Third Street. The shop closed on April 13, 2013. He also franchised a store on Melrose Avenue in Los Angeles, California.

== Early life ==
Plotnik attended New York University and graduated from Fordham University School of Law in 1969. He became a registered attorney in New York State in 1969.

== Death ==
Plotnik died of complications from a stroke he had suffered in 2001 on November 29, 2018. He is buried at Beth David Cemetery in Elmont, New York.
