= Hard to Get (song) =

1955 popular song written by Jack Segal

Song
- Published: 1955
- Songwriter(s): Jack Segal

"Hard to Get"

Single by Gisele MacKenzie
- B-side: "Boston Fancy"
- Released: June 1955
- Recorded: 1955
- Genre: Traditional pop
- Length: 3:10
- Label: X
- Songwriter(s): Jack Segal

Gisele MacKenzie singles chronology
"Don't Let the Stars Get in Your Eyes" (1952)	"Hard to Get" (1955)	"Pepper Hot Baby" (1955)

"Hard to Get" is a popular song written by Jack Segal, and published in 1955.

== Background ==
The song was a hit for Gisele MacKenzie in 1955, with the orchestra conducted by Richard Maltby. The biggest hit of MacKenzie's career, it peaked at number five on Billboard's "Best Sellers in Stores" chart during the summer of that year.
