= Chuck Low =

American actor (1928–2017)

- Chuck Low in Goodfellas, 1990
- Born: Charles Lewis Low; July 21, 1928; New York City, New York
- Died: September 18, 2017 (aged 89); Allendale, New Jersey, U.S.
- Resting place: Beth David Cemetery, Elmont, New York
- Other names: Charles Low; Chuck L. Low; Chuck Lewis Low
- Occupation: Actor
- Years active: 1982–2003

Charles Lewis Low (July 21, 1928 – September 18, 2017) was an American businessman and actor, known for his appearances in films starring his longtime friend and associate Robert De Niro.

== Biography ==
Low was born in New York City to Jewish immigrant parents. His mother was Russian, and his father was Austrian-Polish. He served in the Army National Guard and U.S. Army Reserve, attaining the rank of Major.

Low worked as a real estate developer in the Tribeca neighborhood of New York City. He first met Robert De Niro in 1980, when the actor was a tenant in a building he owned. At the age of 54, he made his film debut opposite De Niro in Martin Scorsese’s The King of Comedy, playing a bit part as a Chinese restaurant customer.

He went on to play other small and supporting roles in films starring De Niro. He played young Deborah Gelly's (Jennifer Connelly) father in Once Upon a Time in America (1984), Don Cabeza in The Mission (1986), Morris "Morrie" Kessler in Goodfellas (1990), Freddy DiMario in Night and the City (1992), Bernie in Mistress (1992), and the dance judge in Sleepers (1996).

His portrayal of Morrie Kessler, a fictionalized version of Lufthansa heist participant Martin Krugman, gained him the most acclaim. The character of Morrie was famous for his "Morrie's Wig Shop" commercial which is seen as comical, and that coupled with his penchant for pestering Jimmy Conway about money leads most of the characters to see him as a nuisance, setting up his eventual murder by Tommy DeVito.

Low also guest starred in a first-season episode of The Sopranos, as Shlomo Teittleman. He can also be seen in Alan Taylor's 2003 film, Kill the Poor.

Aside from his acting work, Lowe continued to work mainly in real estate. For many years, he was De Niro's real estate broker.

== Death ==
Low died at a nursing home in Allendale, New Jersey on September 18, 2017. His remains are interred at Beth David Cemetery in Elmont, New York.

== Filmography ==
Year	Title	Role	Notes
1982	The King of Comedy	Man in Chinese Restaurant	
1984	Once Upon a Time in America	Deborah Gelly's Father	Uncredited
1986	The Mission	Cabeza	
1990	Goodfellas	Morris Kessler	
1992	Mistress	Bernie	
1992	Night and the City	Freddy DiMario	
1996	Sleepers	Dance Judge	
2003	Kill the Poor	Bruno	

=== Television ===
Year	Title	Role	Notes
1998	Law & Order	Hyram Jenkins	Episode: "Disappeared"
1999	The Sopranos	Shlomo Teittleman	Episode: "Denial, Anger, Acceptance"
2001	100 Centre Street		Episode: "No Good Deed Goes Unpunished"
