= Bill Creston =

American painter and filmmaker (1932–2024)

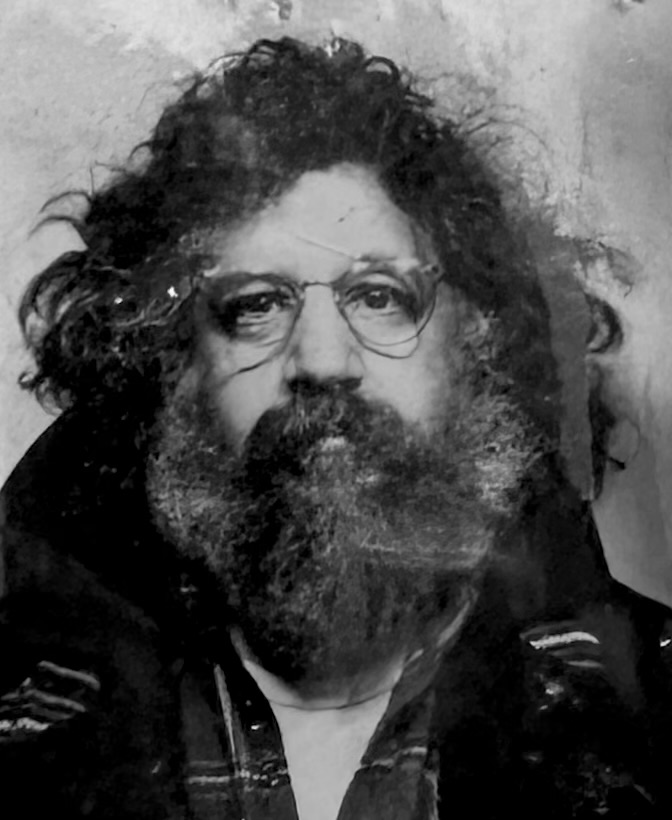
- Bill Creston (Circa 1984)
- Born: William Z Creston; March 16, 1932; Brooklyn, New York, U.S.
- Died: May 30, 2024 (aged 92); Manhattan, New York, U.S.
- Education: High School of Music & Art; Art Students League
- Occupations: Painter, filmmaker, educator
- Years active: 1963–2024
- Employer(s): Cooper Union, School of Visual Arts, CUNY
- Partner: Barbara Rosenthal
- Children: Ola Creston; Sena Clara Creston
- Parent(s): Selma Creston; Samuel Creston

William Z "Bill" Creston (March 16, 1932 – May 30, 2024) was born in Brooklyn, New York City, the second of two sons born to Selma Creston and Samuel Creston. Bill's older brother Seymore died at age twelve from illness when Bill was six years old. Bill Creston was an independent filmmaker, artist and teacher. During the late 1960s Creston was an early advocate of using video as an artistic medium. As an established professional artist, he sparked controversy over his independence and use of dark humor within his avant-garde artworks. His artistic mediums included: painting, street works, performance and films. Creston is credited with initiating the first video departments at both Cooper Union and the School of Visual Arts in New York City.

== Early professional career ==
Creston began formally studying fine art at the High School of Music & Art (1946–1950) in Manhattan, New York. He started his professional career as an artist while studying painting at the Art Students League (ASL) (1950–1954) in New York City. Creston gained a reputation as an iconoclastic artist who used the mediums of painting, street art installation, performance art and video art. His avant-garde narrative and autobiographical films have screened at Lincoln Center, Museum of Modern Art, The Kitchen, and Anthology Film Archives.

=== Painting ===
During the late 1950s and early 1960s, Creston was employed part-time at the Metropolitan Museum of Art along with his friend, artist Ed Clark. The Urinals, his 1968, 48-inch by 96-inch oil-on-masonite triptych painting, depict the urinals in the basement Guards' Room at the Metropolitan Museum of Art where Creston and Clark worked. Creston was an original member of the cooperative Brata Gallery at 89 East 10th Street which was one of the Tenth Street galleries in Manhattan's East Village. Art critic John Canaday reported in the January 17, 1960 New York Times,

On my Tenth Street tour during a presumably typical week of openings I saw nothing that would be much missed if obliterated ... To be merciless, at the Brata Gallery, John Krushenck's drawings seemed to me devoid of taste, talent or ideas, and his companion exhibitor, William Creston, working in scrubs of black ink, managed to be totally inept in a field where to be inept at all is next to impossible.

— John Canaday, "Tenth Street: A Report Without Recommendation for Mercy", Embattled Critic: Views on Modern Art (1962)

Creston continued painting professionally throughout his life. The Pollock-Krasner Foundation Grantee Image Collection holds four of Bill Creston's 2006 oil paintings.

=== Street art and performance art ===
During the 1960s Creston expanded his art media repertoire to include the emerging mediums of street installation, performance art and filmmaking. Creston was an original contributing artist in the 1969 Street Works with public performance pieces exhibited in March and April 1969 in two different city-block areas between 5th and 6th Avenues and 14th and 13th Streets in New York City. In May 1969, John Perreault reported in The Village Voice, "Bill Creston handed out business cards that said 'Go to 15th Street.'" The following month, June 1969, Perreault wrote in The Village Voice,

"'Street Works III' ... was the first in a series to be held at night in a relatively deserted area. The area was from Prince to Grand along Green and Wooster. ... The police moved in around 10:30 and cleared the street. ... future Street Works will have to be either licensed, sponsored, and limited or composed of individual works scattered through out the city at unannounced times and unspecified locations. ... I did see Bill Creston's Pasted Up Arrows."

— John Perreault, "Art Para-Visual", The Village Voice (June 5, 1969)

Creston's Construction Site (1969) gained artistic notoriety when the impromptu installation was so convincing the city of New York put an extra layer of caution flashers around it.

"Early into less expensive new media, Creston also pioneered another low-cost contemporary form. In 1969, as he recalls: ‘I made a piece called Construction Site, which was meant to blend so well into the real world as to become a part of it, and not be noticed as anything special, obtrusive as it might be. I bought lumber, traffic-marking yellow paint, special blinking lights, and other materials. I built a fake construction site, including an obviously fake hole, installing it on 6th Avenue between 22nd and 23rd Streets, in front of a vacant store. It was up for weeks, and several times protected by the police, who supplemented my materials with barricades.’ … Reflecting 1960s ideals of meshing art with life and of making art available to a public larger than well-heeled collectors, Construction Site also echoed Creston’s films in a fascination with New York City street life.”

— Richard Kostelanetz, "Creston, Bill (6 March 1932)", A Dictionary of the Avant-Gardes, Second Edition (2000)

== Experimental filmmaker ==
Creston shifted his professional artist focus to experimental filmmaker. In the early to mid 1960s Creston was building his artist's practice as a painter and creating street art and performance art. By 1970 Creston was concentrating his artistic practice on filmmaking.

Bill Creston started teaching himself how to use the new video technologies Portapak and Super 8 film camera for his independent filmmaking in the late 1960s. Creston was the director, shot the film, recorded the street sounds, created synthesizer music or background sounds, and occasionally scripted and directed others before editing his films. Creston pioneered the use of video technology as an art medium and brought awareness of its use for avant-garde filmmaking by initiating programs at Cooper Union and The School of Visual Arts. Many of Creston's first film screenings took place at The Kitchen art institution, a 1971 newly established avant-garde arts performance space and gallery in Greenwich Village, Manhattan. His first exhibition screening at The Kitchen was in June 1972. Six months later the Around Town section of The Village Voice announced his second show, "Bill Creston Video Program at The Kitchen, 240 Mercer Street, 9 p. m. Dec 28, 1972". Throughout the 1970s, the Village Voice continued announcing Creston's film screenings at The Kitchen art institution.

His videos are of the detached observer and autobiographical. Creston lived his entire life in New York City and worked for decades as a New York City taxi driver. His groundbreaking works as an experimental filmmaker are often focused with his irreverent view and fascination with the street life of his hometown New York City. Two early Creston experimental filmmaking videos are the four-year Video Journal 1971–974, considered the first video journal, and his experimental 1972 collage documentary, From Grandma's House to Bar Mitzvah, using original 16mm film clips from his personal family archives.

His 1974 experimental performance art and live video recording while screening Here + Now Process Video Revolution was "Shot in 1/2-inch open reel off a TV monitor ... inside of the Channel 13 studio during an actual live broadcast of video pioneers and their students." He was working in Super-8 sound film and operating the only full-service Super-8 sound studio in New York City in 1976. Creston's 1977 Museum of Modern Art (MoMA) exhibit 10 Downtown: 10 Years, Sep 11 – October 2, 1977 was followed in January 1978 with a screening of his new films at the Pleiades Gallery on Wooster in SoHo, Manhattan.

Creston opened The Bill Creston Total Super-8 Sound Studio NYC in 1980 and did scriptwriting for WCBS-TV's cable commercials in New York City from 1985 to 1992. Creston had two retrospective screenings of his films at The Kitchen in 1988. The following year in April 1989 Creston had a retrospective, Cineprobe Continues with William Creston on May 8, 1989 at the Museum of Modern Art covering his twenty-five years of filmmaking.

William Creston began to make films in the mid-seventies after working for 20 years as a painter. His works incorporate scripted scenes, fictionalized encounters, news items and New York footage. Creston presents screenings of Six Short Films (1976), a Super-8 work with subjects ranging from trucks to a bar mitzvah; Open Seven Days a Week, Twenty-Four Hours a Day (1976), New York City during America's bicentennial; Runner (1981), an examination of city street culture; I Saw Where You Was Last Night (1984), a series of scenes with scripted and unscripted dialogue; Peanut Butter (1985), five short films; You Ever Hear of Wyatt Earp? (1987), a succession of one-liners highlighting the filmmaker's absurd social observations; and the premiere of Coupons (1989).

— Laurence Kardish and Adrienne Mancia, Curators MoMA Department of Film, Cineprobe Continues with William Creston on May 8, 1989, "MoMA Department of Film Press Release." (1989)

During the summer of 1989 Creston had two of his films screened in the Downtown Community Television Center's Video History Program: Black and White 1/2-inch Open Reel Tapes from the 70's Retrospective, and another screening at the Downtown Community Television Center in 1990. By 1996 Bill Creston had made two dozen films, founded the Bill Creston Super-8 Sound Studio and then founded the eMediaLoft.org with artist-writer Barbara Rosenthal. The ARC Gallery screened his He Stole My Gun film from March 1 through March 24, 2001.

Lincoln Center recognized Creston's 30-years of avant-garde independent filmmaking focused on New York City's street life and chose Creston's film Taxi, Taxi (1977) for their Seeing the City Avant-Garde Visions of New York Retrospective. Taxi, Taxi was screened on May 3, 2024, in Lincoln Center's Program 1: Moving Through the Metropolis: Transit Images three weeks before Bill Creston died on May 30, 2024, at the age of ninety-two years old.

=== Teaching ===
Creston convinced Cooper Union and the School of Visual Arts (SVA) to add classes in video as an artistic medium and used his own Sony Portapak to teach the first academic level classes in video art. Creston was a well liked instructor by his students. While teaching at Hunter College CUNY he received the highest student evaluation report in the history of the school. Chris Stein remembered Creston as easy-going and supportive of his students at SVA.

"A class that somehow attracted a group of like-minded people was the single video-production class. Sony had brought out a line of prosumer stuff in 1967, reel-to-reel video decks, and the school invested in a bunch of them. Our teacher was a very jovial guy named Bill Creston who lived in a great old loft that was over Billy's Topless bar on Sixth Avenue and Twenty-Fourth Street. Bill had been a taxi driver and painter in New York City before becoming a filmmaker. The video-production class was the first one ever at Visual Arts. We made the most of the Sony Portapaks, as they were called, running all over the city shooting and doing on-camera skits."

— Chris Stein, (page 59), Under a Rock: A Memoir. (2024)

==== Academic teaching ====
Partial list of Bill Creston's academic and community teaching from 1970 to 1992.

- 1970–72 The School of Visual Arts (SVA), NYC. Originated first Video Department. Taught Beginning & Advance Video.
- 1971–75 Cooper Union, NYC. Originated first Film & Video Department. Taught Beginning & Advanced Video, Beginning & Advanced Filmmaking.
- 1972–73 LaGuardia Community College CUNY, NYC. Communications Using Film, Video, Photo, Audio, Slides, Performance & Presentation.
- 1974 LA SALA VINCON Barcelona, Spain. Instructor of first Video workshop in Spain.
- 1976 (Fall) Stephens College, Columbia, Missouri. Visiting Artist in Video & Avant-Garde Media.
- 1977 Cooper Union, NYC. Film Screenings & Lecture Series.
- 1978–1985 Hunter College CUNY, NYC. Adjunct Assistant Professor of Art.

==== Community teaching ====
- 1968–1970 The South Bronx Education Center, NYC. Federal Project Art Coordinator.
- 1968–1971 The Fiedel School, Glen Cove, NY. Video Instructor.
- 1976 SUNY Old Westbury, Visiting Artist, Film & Video.
- 1977 Inner City Round-Table For Youth, NYC. Federal Project Director & Instructor of Film & Video.
- 1980–1992 The Bill Creston Total Super-8 Sound Studio, NYC.

== Death ==
Creston died on May 30, 2024. He was interred at Beth David Cemetery in Elmont, New York.

== Filmography ==
Partial list of Bill Creston's original films from 1970 to 2000.

- 1970 Cracks
- 1970 Cripple (12 minutes)
- 1970 Jersey City Tapes (20 minutes)
- 1971–1975 Video Journal (Approximately 20 hours, shown as excerpts.)
- 1971 Bert Lahr (15 minutes)
- 1971 The Monkey Dream (5 minutes)
- 1971 Dead Mouse (2 minutes)
- 1972 Newsdealer (10 minutes)
- 1972 From Grandma's House To Bar Mitzvah (1 hour)
- 1972 Kelsey (45 minutes)
- 1972 The Indiana Tapes (1 hour)
- 1974 Selections From The European Journal (20 hours)
- 1974 Botanica Prayer 24th & 7th
- 1974 Urinals (12 minutes) Filmed in front of Creston's 1968 oil-on-masonite Urinals triptych painting.
- 1974 S.E.G. (7 minutes)
- 1975 The Execution (5 minutes)
- 1976 Open 7 Days A Week, 24 Hours a Day (15 minutes)
- 1976 Six Short Films
- 1977 Leonard Moltz, Sewing Machine
- 1977 Taxi, Taxi (14minutes)
- 1979 Ola, A Film By Her Father
- 1981 Runner (18 minutes)
- 1984 I Saw Where You Was Last Night (14 minutes)
- 1985 Peanut Butter; Water; Stars; Execution; The Execution (5 minutes)
- 1987 You Ever Hear of Wyatt Earp? (10 minutes)
- 1989 Coupons (7 minutes)
- 1990 Don't Roast My Franks
- 1991 Garbage
- 1991 Lunch Hour
- 1996 Duets
- 1996 He Stole My Gun
