= Gisele MacKenzie =

Canadian singer and actress (1927–2003)

Gisèle MacKenzie
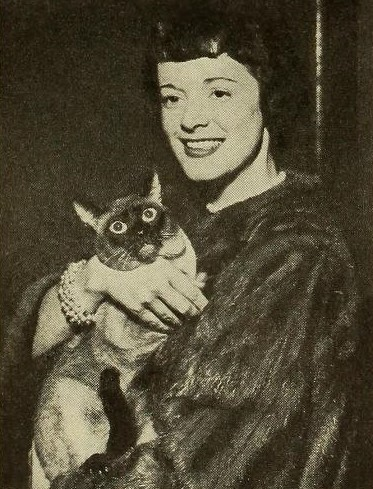
- MacKenzie opens the National Cat Show, 1952

Background information
- Born: Gisèle Marie Louise Marguerite LaFlèche; January 10, 1927; Winnipeg, Manitoba, Canada
- Died: September 5, 2003 (aged 76) Burbank, California, U.S.
- Occupations: Singer, actress, commercial spokesperson
- Labels: Capitol, RCA, X, Everest, Mercury, Liberty Sunset, Cricket Playhour, Design.

Gisèle MacKenzie (born Gisèle Marie Louise Marguerite LaFlèche; January 10, 1927 – September 5, 2003) was a Canadian-American singer, actress, and commercial spokesperson, best known for her performances on the US television program Your Hit Parade.

== Biography ==
She was born Gisèle Marie Louise Marguerite LaFlèche in Winnipeg, Manitoba in 1927. She was the daughter of a Winnipeg doctor. Her mother was a pianist and concert singer who toured Canada as Marietta Monseau. After MacKenzie began picking out tunes on a piano when she was 3 years old, Monseau began coaching her. At age 7, MacKenzie began serious study of playing the violin, her father's favorite instrument. MacKenzie spent her childhood in Manitoba where she studied violin and attended the Sacred Heart School as a child. Her first public recital occurred at a hotel in Winnipeg when she was 12 years old. Beginning when she was 14, she specialized in violin at The Royal Conservatory of Music in Toronto, Ontario. Her six years there included her receiving a scholarship in the graduate school.

She had at least two Canadian Broadcasting Corporation radio programs, Meet Gisèle, where she played hostess to Jack Benny, Clark Gable, Loretta Young, Fred Astaire, and James Stewart; and Gisele and Mr. Cable.

She took on the stage name MacKenzie and moved to Los Angeles, California in 1951 to replace The Andrews Sisters on CBS Radio's daily program, Club Fifteen, starring Bob Crosby, where she alternated as regular vocalist with Jo Stafford. She became a naturalized US citizen in 1955.

MacKenzie recorded albums and singles on various record labels, most notably Capitol and RCA, Everest, Mercury, Liberty Sunset, and Cricket Playhour (Pickwick). In 1953 she reached No. 6 in the UK Singles Chart, with her rendition of "Seven Lonely Days".

Her biggest selling song was "Hard To Get" in 1955. She was also an accomplished classical violinist, studying at The Royal Conservatory of Music; she performed many comedic musical duets with mentor Jack Benny. In an often-played clip, she and Benny perform a violin duet of "Getting to Know You", in which she breaks their synchronization several times to add some extra musical flourishes, to his mock irritation. Finally, he breaks in with a lengthy (and stereotypically mediocre) flourish of his own, and evokes audience laughter with mock indignation: "Fool around with ME, sister!"

She was a guest on such shows as The Jack Benny Program; The Dinah Shore Chevy Show; The Ford Show, Starring Tennessee Ernie Ford; The Pat Boone Chevy Showroom; The Bell Telephone Hour; The Colgate Comedy Hour; The Eddie Fisher Show; The George Gobel Show; and The Ed Sullivan Show. She acted in Justice. She appeared frequently in Las Vegas venues and in numerous North American concerts. She did a European tour with Benny.

In the United States, she replaced the Andrews Sisters as a regular vocalist on "Club 15" and her guest appearance on Mario Lanza's "Coke Time" resulted in Lanza inviting her to join his show's cast every week. She also hosted a radio show entitled Airtime at the same time she was appearing on TV's Your Hit Parade.

In 1952–53, she toured with Jack Benny, who recommended her for Your Hit Parade. During her 4-year tenure on that show, "Hard to Get" became a hit. She announced in 1957 that she would not be returning to the show for another season. She went on to star in her own short lived Saturday night NBC variety program, The Gisele MacKenzie Show, and hosted such guests as Benny, Boris Karloff, Ronald Reagan, Bobby Diamond, and folk singer Jimmie Rodgers; it was cancelled after twentysix weeks. She returned to television in 1963 as Sid Caesar's 4th television wife on The Sid Caesar Show, in which she did comedy with Caesar and sang a song each week. 1959 saw the release of her first of a series of children's albums, "Gisele MacKenzie sings Lullaby and Goodnight". The album sold very well and resulted in two more for Cricket Play Hour Records (Pickwick).

Starting in 1955, during her summer breaks from Your Hit Parade, she added musical comedies to her resume musical theater by starring in such classics as Annie Get Your Gun, The King and I, and South Pacific.

In 1957 she appeared in the TV drama Love at Fourth Sight.

In 1959, MacKenzie starred in The Miss and The Missles, an unsold pilot.

In 1986, she appeared in several episodes as a temporary recast in the role of Katherine Chancellor on The Young and the Restless. She expanded her acting credits in the 1990s, making guest appearances on television series including Murder, She Wrote, Boy Meets World, and MacGyver.

MacKenzie has a star on the Hollywood Walk Of Fame at 1601 Vine.

== Personal life ==
MacKenzie was married to her personal manager, Robert J. Shuttleworth (February 24, 1958 – August 12, 1966) and to Robert F. Klein (May 10, 1975–????); both marriages ended in divorce. She had a son, MacKenzie Duffy, and a daughter, contemporary jazz artist Gigi MacKenzie.

== Death ==
MacKenzie died from colon cancer, aged 76, on September 5, 2003, in Burbank, California.

== Singles ==
This list is incomplete.

- "Le Fiacre" (February 1952, U.S. airplay #20) Capitol F1907 b/w "Tuh Pocket Tuh Pocket (Mississippi River Boat)"
- "Adios" (August 1952, U.S. airplay #14) Capitol F2156 b/w "Darlin', You Can't Love Two"
- "Don't Let the Stars Get in Your Eyes" (December 1952, U.S. airplay #11/jukebox play #18) Capitol F2256 b/w "My Favorite Song"
- "Hard to Get" (June 1955, U.S. airplay #4/sales #5/jukebox play #5) "X" 0137 b/w "Boston Fancy"
- "Pepper Hot Baby" (November 1955, U.S. top 100 #60) "X" 0172 b/w "That's the Chance I've Got To Take"
- "The Star You Wished Upon Last Night" (November 1956, U.S. top 100 #42) Vik 0233 b/w "It's Delightful to Be Married"
- "He Knows" (February 1957) Vik 0249 b/w "Hello There"
- "Oh Pain! Oh Agony! (Know What I Mean Jellybean)" (June 1957, CHUM radio Toronto #26) Vik 0274 b/w "The Waltz That Broke My Heart"
- "Come to Me, My True Love" (March 1958) RCA 7183 b/w "They're Playing Our Song"
- "Hey There" 1958
- "Seven Lonely Days"
