= List of number-one hits of 1968 (Germany) =

This is a list of the German Media Control Top100 Singles Chart number-ones of 1968.

Issue date	Song	Artist
6 January	"Massachusetts"	Bee Gees
13 January	"Massachusetts"	Bee Gees
20 January	"Der letzte Walzer"	Peter Alexander
27 January	"Der letzte Walzer"	Peter Alexander
3 February	"Hello, Goodbye"	The Beatles
10 February	"Hello, Goodbye"	The Beatles
17 February	"World"	Bee Gees
24 February	"Judy in Disguise (With Glasses)"	John Fred & His Playboy Band
2 March	"Judy in Disguise (With Glasses)"	John Fred & His Playboy Band
9 March	"Judy in Disguise (With Glasses)"	John Fred & His Playboy Band
16 March	"Bleib bei mir"	Roy Black
23 March	"Bleib bei mir"	Roy Black
30 March	"Mighty Quinn"	Manfred Mann
6 April	"Mighty Quinn"	Manfred Mann
13 April	"Words"	Bee Gees
20 April	"Words"	Bee Gees
27 April	"Mama"	Heintje
4 May	"Mama"	Heintje
11 May	"Delilah"	Tom Jones
18 May	"Delilah"	Tom Jones
25 May	"Delilah"	Tom Jones
1 June	"Delilah"	Tom Jones
8 June	"Delilah"	Tom Jones
15 June	"Delilah"	Tom Jones
22 June	"Delilah"	Tom Jones
29 June	"Delilah"	Tom Jones
6 July	"Delilah"	Tom Jones
13 July	"Delilah"	Peter Alexander
20 July	"Delilah"	Peter Alexander
27 July	"Jumpin' Jack Flash"	The Rolling Stones
3 August	"Jumpin' Jack Flash"	The Rolling Stones
10 August	"Du sollst nicht weinen"	Heintje
17 August	"Du sollst nicht weinen"	Heintje
24 August	"Du sollst nicht weinen"	Heintje
31 August	"Du sollst nicht weinen"	Heintje
7 September	"Help Yourself"	Tom Jones
14 September	"Help Yourself"	Tom Jones
21 September	"Help Yourself"	Tom Jones
28 September	"Help Yourself"	Tom Jones
5 October	"Hey Jude"	The Beatles
12 October	"Hey Jude"	The Beatles
19 October	"Help Yourself"	Tom Jones
26 October	"Help Yourself"	Tom Jones
2 November	"Heidschi Bumbeidschi"	Heintje
9 November	"Heidschi Bumbeidschi"	Heintje
16 November	"Heidschi Bumbeidschi"	Heintje
23 November	"Heidschi Bumbeidschi"	Heintje
30 November	"Those Were the Days"	Mary Hopkin
7 December	"Those Were the Days"	Mary Hopkin
14 December	"Heidschi Bumbeidschi"	Heintje
21 December	"Heidschi Bumbeidschi"	Heintje
28 December	"Heidschi Bumbeidschi"	Heintje

== See also ==
- List of number-one hits (Germany)
