= Gee Baby =

1959 single by Joe & Ann

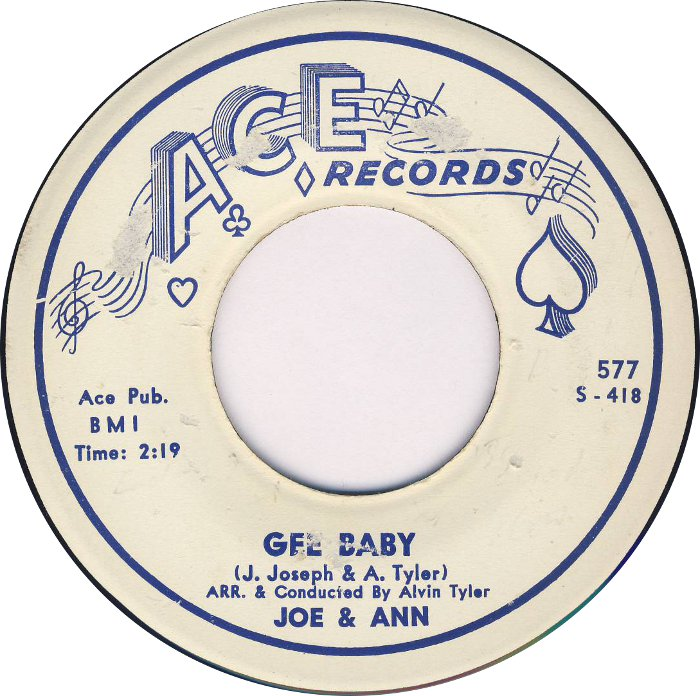

Single by Joe & Ann
- A-side: "Gee Baby"; "Wherever You May Be"
- Released: December 1959
- Recorded: 1959
- Genre: Funk, soul
- Length: 2:19
- Label: Ace
- Songwriters: Joe Joseph and Alvin Tyler

Joe & Ann singles chronology
"Gee Baby" / "Wherever You May Be" (1959)	"Curiosity" / "How I Feel" (1962)

"Gee Baby" is a song originally released by the duo Joe & Ann. It was co-written by Joe Joseph and Alvin Tyler, arranged and produced by Tyler, and recorded in New Orleans, possibly with Mac Rebennack (Dr. John) on keyboards. Released as a single in 1959, it peaked at no. 14 on U.S. Billboard's R'n'B chart, called Hot R&B Sides at the time.

== Track listings ==
7" single Ace Records 577 (1959, US)

A. "Wherever You May Be" (2:20)
B. "Gee Baby" (2:19)

7" single Black Swan WI-468 (1959, UK)

A. "Gee Baby" (2:19)
B. "Wherever You May Be" (2:20)

== Charts ==
Chart (1959)	Peak position
US Hot R&B/Hip-Hop Songs (Billboard)	14

== Mickey & Sylvia version ==
"Baby You're So Fine"

Single by Mickey & Sylvia
- Released: July 1961
- Genre: R&B
- Length: 2:30
- Label: Willow
- Songwriters: Joe Joseph and Alvin Tyler

Mickey & Sylvia singles chronology
"Love Lesson" (1961)	"Baby You're So Fine" (1961)	"Lovedrops" (1961)

In 1961 the song was covered, under the title "Baby You're So Fine", by another duo, Mickey & Sylvia. Their version reached no. 26 on Billboard's R&B chart and no. 52 on the Billboard Hot 100.

=== Charts ===
Chart (1961)	Peak position
US Billboard Hot 100	52
US Hot R&B/Hip-Hop Songs (Billboard)	26

== Sylvie Vartan version (in French) ==
"Tous les gens"

Single by Sylvie Vartan
- Language: French
- English title: Everybody
- Released: January 1963
- Recorded: Late 1962
- Genre: Pop
- Length: 1:54
- Label: RCA Victor
- Songwriters: T. Texas Tyler, Ralph Bernet, Sylvia Robinson, J.J. Johnson, Mickey Baker, Eddie Vartan

Sylvie Vartan singles chronology
"Tous mes copains" (1963)	"Chance" / "Il revient" / "Reponds-moi" / "Il revient" / "Reponds-moi" / "Tous les gens" (1963)	"En écoutant la pluie" (1963)

The song was later reworked into French under the title "Tous les gens" ("Everybody"). It was recorded by Sylvie Vartan and released in 1963 on an EP. In France her version of the song spent two consecutive weeks on the singles sales chart (from 30 March to 12 April 1963).

=== Track listing ===
EP Sylvie ("Chance" / "Il revient" / "Reponds-moi" / "Tous les gens") RCA Victor 76.617 (1963, France)

A1. "Chance" ("Chains")
A2. "Il revient" ("Say Mama")
B1. "Reponds-moi"
B2. "Tous les gens" ("Baby You’re So Fine")

=== Charts ===
Chart (1963)	Peak position
Belgium (Ultratop 50 Wallonia)	33
France (singles sales)	1
