= Narciso Serradell Sevilla =

Narciso Serradell Sevilla (1843 in Alvarado – 1910 in Mexico City) was a Mexican physician and composer, best known as the author of the song "La golondrina". After theological college he had studied medicine and music.

During the French intervention in Mexico he was captured and exiled to France, where he devoted himself to teaching music and Spanish. Before the deportation he composed his most famous work, "La golondrina" ("The Swallow"), which became the signature song of the Mexican exiles.

After returning to Mexico, he practiced his medical profession while still composing music and directing military bands. He died in Mexico City at the age of 67 years.
