= Gigi MacKenzie =

American smooth jazz artist

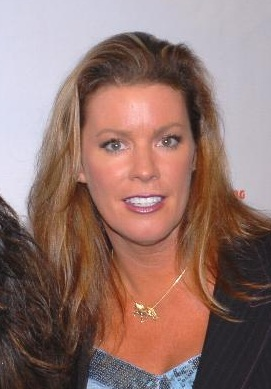
MacKenzie in 2007

Gigi MacKenzie (born 1962) is a smooth jazz artist and the daughter of singer Gisele MacKenzie.

MacKenzie has a number of credits as a studio singer in Los Angeles. She has recorded national commercials and music for major movie soundtracks, including the hit movie Mr. Holland's Opus and the Eddie Jobson composed theme song to Nash Bridges in seasons 2-5 on CBS. She has performed with artists such as Michael McDonald, Kenny Loggins, Gladys Knight, Christopher Cross and Tom Scott, and many others.

== Skylark (2007) ==
In her first solo album, Skylark, MacKenzie duets with her mother, Gisele MacKenzie, on the song "Stranger In Paradise" as well as with longtime collaborator Christopher Cross on the song "That's All".
