= Denial, Anger, Acceptance =

- The Sopranos episode
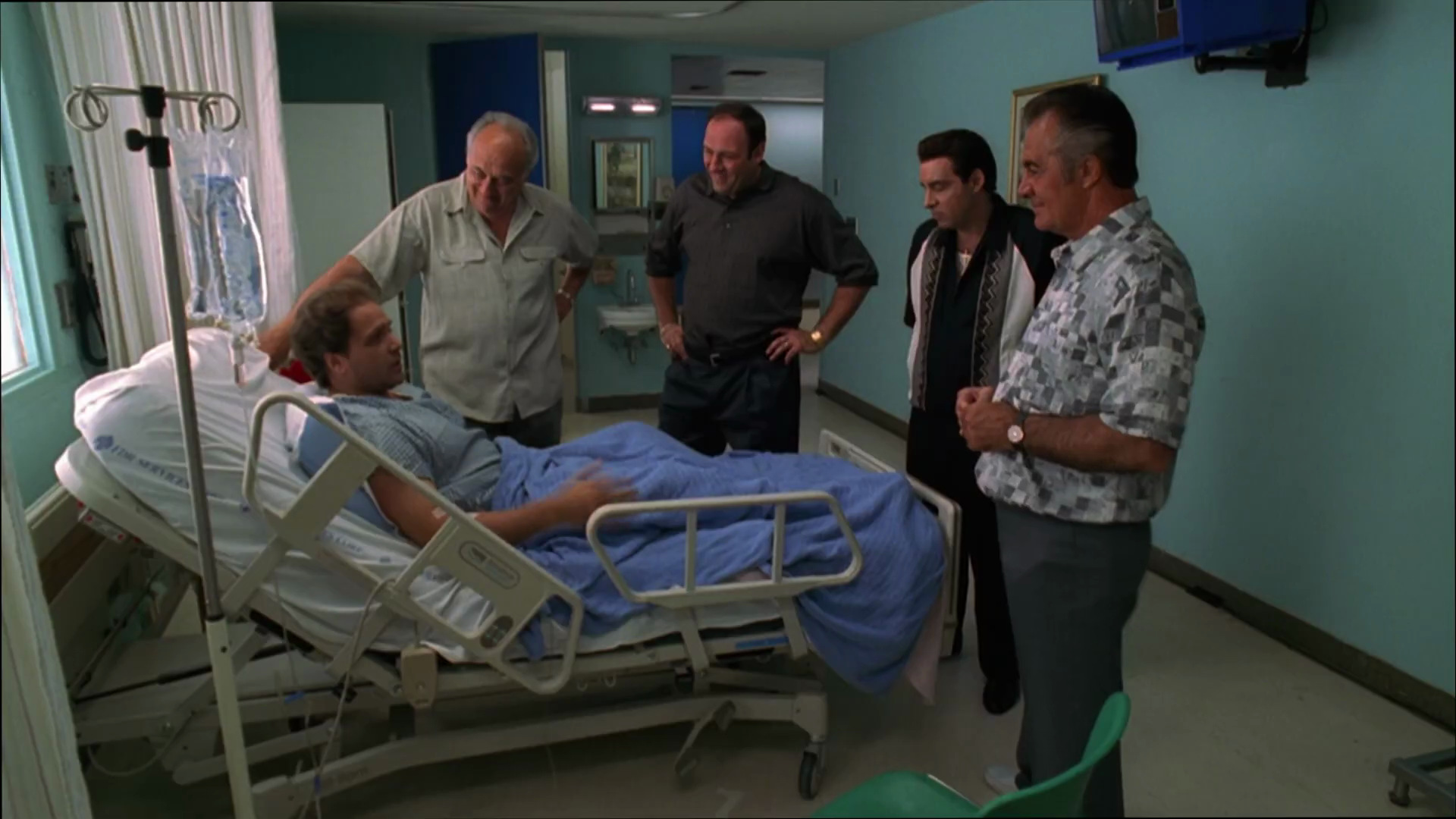
- Tony Soprano and his crew visiting Jackie Aprile, Sr. in the hospital
- Episode no.: Season 1 Episode 3
- Directed by: Nick Gomez
- Written by: Mark Saraceni
- Cinematography by: Alik Sakharov
- Production code: 103
- Original air date: January 24, 1999
- Running time: 45 minutes

Episode chronology
← Previous "46 Long"	Next → "Meadowlands"
- The Sopranos season 1

"Denial, Anger, Acceptance" is the third episode of the HBO original series The Sopranos. It was written by Mark Saraceni, directed by Nick Gomez and originally aired on January 24, 1999.

== Synopsis ==
Shlomo Teittleman, the head of a Hasidic Jewish family, approaches Tony when his son-in-law, Ariel, demands a 50% stake in a family-owned motel as his condition for a divorce. Tony agrees to remove Ariel's claim in return for a 25% stake. Ariel refuses to yield despite being beaten by Silvio and Paulie. They consult Tony, who in turn consults Hesh, who obliquely suggests threatening him with castration; Ariel finally gives up his claim. When Teittleman attempts to renegotiate the agreement, Tony angrily refuses.

Jackie, who is dying from stomach cancer, has been hospitalized. Tony brings him a dancer from the Bada Bing for a "private party" but the deteriorating Jackie cannot think of anything else. Meanwhile, Artie is depressed by the loss of his restaurant; the insurance company refuses to pay him out, suspecting arson. Artie and his wife Charmaine cater a charity event at the Sopranos' house; an argument between him and Tony turns into a childish food fight. During the event, Carmela offends Charmaine by seeming to treat her like a servant. Afterward, Charmaine confides to Carmela that, prior to his marriage, she slept with Tony.

Meadow and one of her friends, Hunter Scangarelo, exhausted from choir practice and studying for the SATs, decide to purchase methamphetamine from Christopher. Christopher initially refuses, fearing Tony's wrath if he finds out; his girlfriend, Adriana La Cerva, convinces him to do it anyway, as the girls are likely to get adulterated and unsafe drugs from less trustworthy dealers. Christopher reluctantly agrees, stressing that Meadow must never speak of it. At the recital, Meadow and Hunter, showing subtle signs of methamphetamine use, sing their brief solos successfully.

After Christopher and Brendan return the stolen truck, Uncle Junior discusses what action to take next with his underling, Mikey Palmice, and with Livia. Obliquely, Livia advises Junior to punish Christopher and take drastic action against Brendan. Out alone one night, Christopher is seized by Russian thugs who prepare to kill him. He thinks they have been sent by Tony because he sold methamphetamine to Meadow. Terrified, he pleads for his life, but it is only a mock execution. Brendan is shot dead in his bathtub by Mikey; Junior glances at the body.

== Deceased ==
- Brendan Filone: shot in the head by Mikey Palmice on the orders of Junior.

== Starring ==
- James Gandolfini as Tony Soprano
- Lorraine Bracco as Dr. Jennifer Melfi
- Edie Falco as Carmela Soprano
- Michael Imperioli as Christopher Moltisanti
- Dominic Chianese as Corrado Soprano, Jr.
- Vincent Pastore as Pussy Bonpensiero *
- Steven Van Zandt as Silvio Dante
- Tony Sirico as Paulie Gualtieri
- Robert Iler as Anthony Soprano, Jr. *
- Jamie-Lynn Sigler as Meadow Soprano
- Nancy Marchand as Livia Soprano

* = credit only

=== Guest starring ===
- Michael Rispoli as Jackie Aprile, Sr
- Jerry Adler as Hesh Rabkin
- John Ventimiglia as Artie Bucco
- Kathrine Narducci as Charmaine Bucco
- Ned Eisenberg as Ariel
- Chuck Low as Shlomo

==== Also guest starring ====
- Al Sapienza as Mikey Palmice
- Anthony DeSando as Brendan Filone
- Drea de Matteo as Adriana La Cerva
- Sharon Angela as Rosalie Aprile
- Oksana Lada as Irina Peltsin
- Michele DeCesare as Hunter Scangarelo
- Sig Libowitz as Hillel
- Sasha Nesterov as Russian Man
- Bernadette Penotti as Nurse
- Slava Schoot as Russian Man
- Angelica Torn as Woman at Party
- Joseph Tudisco as Trucker
- Jennifer Wiltsie as Miss Marris
- Richard L. Bergman as Man at the Party

== Production ==
This is the first episode where Irina is played by Oksana Lada. She was originally portrayed by Siberia Federico in the pilot.

== Title reference ==
Denial, anger, and acceptance are the first, second, and fifth stages of grief, respectively, described in the Kübler-Ross model. In this episode, Tony is initially in denial that Jackie is going to die, telling Melfi that "Jackie's so mean he'll scare that cancer away!" Later in the episode, he becomes angry when Melfi says Jackie's prognosis does not sound good, and storms out of her office. Near the end of the episode, Tony accepts that Jackie is about to die, and tells Melfi "It's like he's already gone."

== Reception ==
In a retrospective review, Emily St. James of The A.V. Club wrote that the "[ending] montage - intercut with Tony watching Meadow sing - is one of the first moments when The Sopranos takes music and rises above its prosaic, muddy universe to become something like sublime"; St. James commented that although the episode "is a 'Let's get the plot wheels turning!' kind of episode, and those sorts of episodes can be a little trying from time to time", there is nonetheless "lots of it that is just expertly executed". Alan Sepinwall praised Gandolfini's performance as well as the story involving Carmela and Charmaine, writing that the show "has a really great eye and ear for insults – particularly ones not necessarily intended as such".
