= Backfield in Motion (song) =

Single by Mel and Tim

from the album Good Guys Only Win in the Movies
- B-side: "Do Right Baby"
- Released: 1969
- Recorded: 1969
- Label: Bamboo BMB 107
- Songwriters: T. McPherson; M. Harden
- Producers: Karl & Chandler Productions

Mel and Tim singles chronology
"Backfield in Motion" (1969)	"Good Guys Only Win in the Movies" (1970)

"Backfield in Motion" is a 1969 song by the vocal duo Mel & Tim. It uses American football terminology to describe the nature of a relationship between a man and woman. It made the Cash Box and Billboard charts that same year.

== Background ==
"Backfield in Motion" bw "Do it Right Baby" was released in the US on Bamboo 107, it was reviewed in the September 20 issue of Cash Box. The football terminology was noted with the reviewer saying that the "football imagery was given a strange and novel twist". The top forty probability was also noted.

This song is unrelated to the 1964 song "Backfield in Motion" by girl group The Angelos, which appeared on Tollie Records and Vee Jay Records or the Poindexter Brothers' 1966 release "(Git Your) Backfield In Motion" on Verve.

== Airplay ==
=== United States ===
According to Cash Box in the magazine's September 20 issue, the song was reportedly making noise in Chicago. Also in the same week, Cash Box noted that it had been added to the playlist of New Orleans Top 40 station WTIX. It was also in the R&B section of Stan's Juke Box Picks of the Week. It was added to the playlist of WQXI in Atlanta on the week ending October 4, 1969. On the week ending October 11, it was added to the playlist of WCAO in Baltimore. Also that week, 8% of key radio stations in the US had added the song to their playlists.

=== Canada ===
It was getting attention from CKFH in Toronto as per the RPM Action Centres list for the week of 8 November 1969. For the week of 8 November, it was getting attention from CKOC in Hamilton as per the RPM Action Centres list in Canada for the week of 1 November 1969.

Also in Toronto, CHUM-AM moved it from 30–9 in the week of 15 November.

For the week of 22 November, the RPM Action Centres list showed that the song was getting attention from Radio Mutuel.

== Charts ==
=== Cash Box ===
Top 50 In R & B Locations

On the week ending September 27, 1969, "Backfield in Motion" made its debut at no. 43 in the Cash Box Top 50 In R & B Locations chart. It peaked at no. 1 on the week ending November 8. It would hold that position for an additional two weeks with "Someday We'll Be Together" by Diana Ross & the Supremes taking the no. 1 spot on the week ending November 29.

Top 100

On the week ending October 25, it debuted in the Cash Box Top 100 chart. It would reach the peak position of no. 12 on the week ending December 6. It would drop down to no. 13 the following week but regain the no. 12 position one more time on the week ending December 20.

=== Billboard ===
Hot 100

It was noted by Billboard for the week ending October 18, 1969 that "Backfield in Motion" was a national breakout. It debuted at no. 48 on the Billboard Hot 100 chart on that week. At week 9, on the week ending December 13, it peaked at no. 10.

Best Selling Soul Singles

At week seven, it peaked at no. 3 on the Billboard Best Selling Soul Singles chart on the week ending November 29.

=== Canada ===
The single debuted at no. 77 in the RPM 100 chart for the week of 1 November 1969. It its sixth charting week, it peaked at no. 14 on the RPM 100 chart for the week of 6 December during its eight-week run.

It also debuted on the Canada 's Top Singles chart at no. 18 as shown by Billboard in the December 6 issue.

=== United Kingdom ===
"Backfield in Motion" debuted in the UK chart on January 26, 1974. It was noted as a "Breaker" by Record Mirror in the magazine's February 9 and 16 issues. It peaked at no. 52.

== Other versions ==
The Mills Brothers recorded a version which appeared on their 1969 The Mills Brothers in Motion album.

Anthony Swete recorded a version of "Backfield in Motion". Backed with the Wayne Carson composition, "Soul Deep", it was released on RCA Victor 1905 in the UK. It was released in New Zealand on Allied International PPX 302 with Swete's version backed with "Yester Me, Yester You, Yesterday" by Pip Bravo, and in Australia on RCA 101882 on a two-artist single release with Mark Juhns covering "Make Believe". It was actually released there before Mel & Tim's version was picked up. James Hamilton of Record Mirror reviewed Swete's version. After informing the readers that the Mel & Tim hit hadn't been picked up for release in the UK yet, and pointing out that Swete's release wasn't the same song as the Poindexter Brothers one, he called it a "Nicely dated beater with Sam & Dave-ish vocal touches", he also said it was quite good and gave it a two star rating.

JB's Allstars recorded a version which made the UK charts in 1984. It spent four weeks in the charts and peaked at no. 48.
