= Groove Records =

- Parent company: RCA Victor
- Founded: 1953
- Defunct: 1965
- Status: Absorbed into RCA Victor: Defunct
- Distributor: RCA Victor Records
- Genre: Rhythm & Blues (first incarnation), Country (second incarnation)
- Country of origin: United States
- Location: New York City

Groove Records was a subsidiary of RCA Victor, founded by Billboard writer Bob Rolontz in 1953 as a rhythm and blues label. The label tried hard to break into the R&B market; Piano Red had its first hit but Mickey & Sylvia was Groove's first big seller. Groove also recorded King Curtis, Arthur Crudup, Brook Benton and George Benson. Following Mickey & Sylvia's big hit "Love Is Strange" in 1957, Groove was deactivated and the label's remaining artists switched over to the RCA Victor Vik subsidiary.

In 1961, Groove was revived as a budget singles label primarily for country music, with a few pop and R&B artists. The label was given a full revival in 1963. Artists who recorded for the later incarnation of Groove included Anthony Swete, Sonny James, Justin Tubb, Marty Paich, Johnny Nash, Jack Scott, Johnnie Ray, Skip Battin, and Charlie Rich. This version of the Groove label was dissolved in 1965.

== See also ==
- List of record labels
