= Mickey & Sylvia =

American R&B duo (1954–1965)

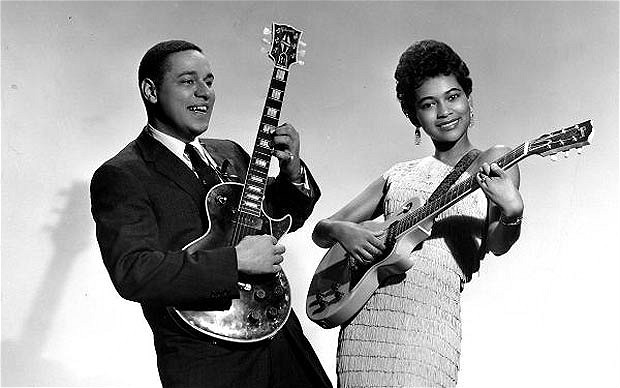
- Mickey & Sylvia in 1956

Background information
- Genres: R&B, soul, pop, doo-wop
- Years active: 1954–1965
- Labels: Rainbow, Groove, Vik, RCA Victor, Willow, King, Stang, His Master's Voice
- Past members: Mickey Baker; Sylvia Vanterpool

Mickey & Sylvia was an American R&B duo composed of Mickey Baker and Sylvia Vanterpool, who later became Sylvia Robinson. They are best known for their number-one R&B single "Love Is Strange" in 1957.

Baker and Vanterpool began recording together in 1954. They first recorded as Mickey & Sylvia in 1955 on Rainbow Records before signing to Groove Records where they became the first big seller for the label. The duo later formed their own label, Willow Records. Although Mickey & Sylvia initially disbanded in 1958, they reunited in 1960 and continued to record together on an infrequent basis until 1965, when Baker moved to France.

== Career ==
In the mid-1950s, music instructor Mickey Baker was inspired by the success of husband-and-wife musical duo Les Paul and Mary Ford to form a duo with one of his pupils Sylvia Robinson. They released their first record together, "Fine Love," as "Little" Sylvia Vanderpool (Vanderpool now with a "D") with Mickey Baker and His Band on Cat Records in 1954.

Baker and Vanterpool released their first record, "I'm So Glad," as Mickey & Sylvia on Rainbow Records in 1955. They recorded for the RCA label subsidiary Groove Records in 1956. While sharing the bill with Bo Diddley at Howard Theatre in Washington, D.C., Vanterpool was inspired by his song "Love Is Strange." With his blessing, Mickey & Sylvia recorded their own rendition. Their single was released in November 1956. It became their biggest hit, topping the US R&B chart and peaking at No. 11 in the US pop chart in January 1957. The record sold over one million copies and was awarded a gold disc by the RIAA.

In 1957, Mickey & Sylvia recorded for Vik Records. They had two other singles chart in 1957 with "There Oughta Be A Law" and "Dearest." In 1958, Mickey & Sylvia split up because Vanterpool wanted to pursue a solo career. Vanterpool married Joseph Robinson in 1959 and thereafter went by Sylvia Robinson. Baker replaced her with singer Kitty Noble. Mickey & Kitty released three records on Atlantic Records in 1959. Baker also released his debut solo album, The Wildest Guitar, in 1959.

After a two year hiatus, Mickey & Sylvia were reunited by Hugo & Luigi at RCA Victor in 1960. They also established a publishing company. In 1961, they formed their own label, Willow Records, distributed by King Records, which produced the singles "Lovedrops" and "Baby You're So Fine." That year Robinson contributed to Ike & Tina Turner's hit record "It's Gonna Work Out Fine." She produced the track and played guitar although she did not receive credit. The single earned Ike & Tina Turner their first Grammy Award nomination. Ike Turner wrote Mickey & Sylvia's song "He Gave Me Everything," which was released as a B-side single to "Since I Fell For You" in 1962.

A second studio recording of "Love Is Strange" in 1962 featured the drummer Bernard "Pretty" Purdie, on his first paid session gig.

After the duo split, Baker recorded a successful instrumental solo album, The Wildest Guitar. He moved to France in the 1960s, where he worked with various French musicians. Baker died at his home in Montastruc-la-Conseillère, France on November 27, 2012, at the age of 87.

Sylvia Robinson had a hit record in 1973 with "Pillow Talk," and was subsequently a driving force in the creation of the Sugar Hill rap label. Robinson died in 2011, at the age of 76.

== Legacy ==
"Love Is Strange" (in its 1956 version) was later featured in movies like Dirty Dancing (it was the B-side of (I've Had) The Time Of My Life by Jennifer Warnes & Bill Medley), Badlands and Casino, and was covered many times (for instance, on Paul McCartney's third post-Beatles album Wild Life). The song became a UK hit by the Everly Brothers in 1965. Peaches & Herb had a hit with their rendition in 1967.

In 2004, "Love Is Strange" was inducted into the Grammy Hall of Fame.

== Discography ==
=== Albums ===
- 1957: New Sounds (Vik LX-1102)
- 1965: "Love Is Strange" and Other Bests (RCA Camden CAL/CAS-863) (LP compilation)
- 1973: Mickey And Sylvia Do It Again (RCA Victor APM1-0327) (LP compilation)
- 1989: Love Is Strange & Other Hits (RCA 9900-2-R) (CD compilation)
- 1990: Love Is Strange (Bear Family BCD-15438) (2-CD compilation)
- 1995: The Willow Sessions (Sequel NEM-CD-763) (CD compilation)
- 1997: Love Is Strange: A Golden Classics Edition (Collectables COL-5833) (CD compilation)
- 2006 "Love Is Strange" and Other Bests (RCA Camden/Sony/BMG 2876-85183) (CD reissue of 1965 LP)
- 2018 Mickey & Sylvia Love Is Strange - All The Hit Singles A's & B's 1950-1962 (Jasmine JASMCD 3093)

=== Singles ===
Release date	Title	Label and cat. number	Peak chart position	
Release date	Title	Label and cat. number	US	US R&B
1954	"Fine Love"	Cat 45-102	—	—
1955	"I'm So Glad"	Rainbow 45-316	—	—
1955	"Rise Sally Rise"	Rainbow 45-318	—	—
1956	"Where Is My Honey?"	Rainbow 45-330	—	—
1956	"No Good Lover"	Groove 4G-0164	—	—
1956	"Love Is Strange"	Groove 4G-0175	11	1
1957	"There Ought To Be a Law"	Vik 4X-0267	47	8
1957	"Dearest"	Vik 4X-0267	85	—
1957	"Two Shadows On Your Window"	Vik 4X-0280	—	—
1957	"Love Is A Treasure"	Vik 4X-0290	—	—
1957	"Where Is My Honey"	Vik 4X-0297	—	—
1958	"Bewildered"	Vik 4X-0324	57	—
1958	"It's You I Love"	Vik 4X-0334	—	—
1958	"To The Valley"	RCA Victor 47-7403	—	—
1960	"Mommy Out De Light"	RCA Victor 47-7774	—	—
1960	"This Is My Story"	RCA Victor 47-7811	100	—
1960	"What Would I Do"	RCA Victor 47-7811	46	—
1961	"Love Lesson"	RCA Victor 47-7877	—	—
1961	"Baby You're So Fine"	Willow 45-23000	52	27
1961	"Lovedrops"	Willow 45-23000	97	—
1961	"Darling (I Miss You So)"	Willow 45-23002	—	—
1962	"Since I Fell For You"	Willow 45-23004	—	—
1962	"Love Is Strange"	Willow 45-23006	—	—
1965	"Love Is Strange"	King K-6006	—	—
1965	"Let's Shake Some More"	RCA Victor 47-8517	—	—
1965	"Fallin' In Love"	RCA Victor 47-8582	—	—
