= Mel and Tim =

American soul music duo

Mel & Tim
- Origin: United States
- Genres: Soul, R&B
- Years active: 1969–1974
- Labels: Bamboo, Stax
- Past members: Mel Hardin; Tim McPherson †

Mel and Tim were an American soul music duo active from 1969 to 1974. They are best known for the hit songs "Backfield in Motion", "Starting All Over Again" and "Good Guys Only Win in the Movies".

== Career ==
Melvin McArthur Hardin (born November 30, 1948 – August 18, 2026) and Hubert Timothy McPherson (December 9, 1949 – July 4, 1986) were cousins from Holly Springs, Mississippi, who traveled to Chicago, where they were discovered by Gene Chandler. Yolanda Hardin (who was Mel Hardin's mother and McPherson's aunt) along with their cousins Walita, Catha, Donny and Darris Maxwell, helped the duo with songwriting and publicity.

Yolanda, formerly a singer, signed them to a recording contract with her Bamboo Records, and they recorded their own song, "Backfield in Motion". The record was immediately successful, reaching number 3 on Billboard magazine's R&B chart and number 10 on its pop chart in 1969. It sold over one million copies and was awarded a gold disc. Their follow-up record was "Good Guys Only Win in the Movies", which was also the title of their first album.

Hardin and McPherson subsequently moved to Stax Records, for which they recorded a second top 5 R&B hit, the ballad "Starting All Over Again", released in the United States in June 1972. The record climbed to number 19 on the Billboard pop chart and stayed on the chart for 20 weeks. Five months after its release, it was their second million seller. It was also the title track of their second album, released in 1972, recorded in Muscle Shoals and produced by Phillip Mitchell. Their self-titled final album appeared in 1973. Mel and Tim performed at the Wattstax charity concert that year, but later recordings could not repeat their earlier successes.

"Backfield in Motion" was covered by Anthony Swete. "Starting All Over Again" was covered by Hall and Oates in 1990 for their album Change of Season.

== Discography ==
=== Charted singles ===
List of charted singles, with selected peak chart positions
Year	Title	Chart positions		
Year	Title	US Pop	US R&B	AUS
1969	"Backfield in Motion"	10	3	79
1970	"Good Guys Only Win in the Movies"	45	17	—
1972	"Starting All Over Again"	19	4	—
1973	"I May Not Be What You Want"	113	33	—
1974	"That's the Way I Want to Live My Life"	—	79	—
1974	"Forever and a Day"	—	88	—

=== Albums ===
Year	Title
1970	Good Guys Only Win in the Movies
1972	Starting All Over Again
1973	Mel and Tim
