= Judy in Disguise (With Glasses) =

1967 single by John Fred & His Playboy Band

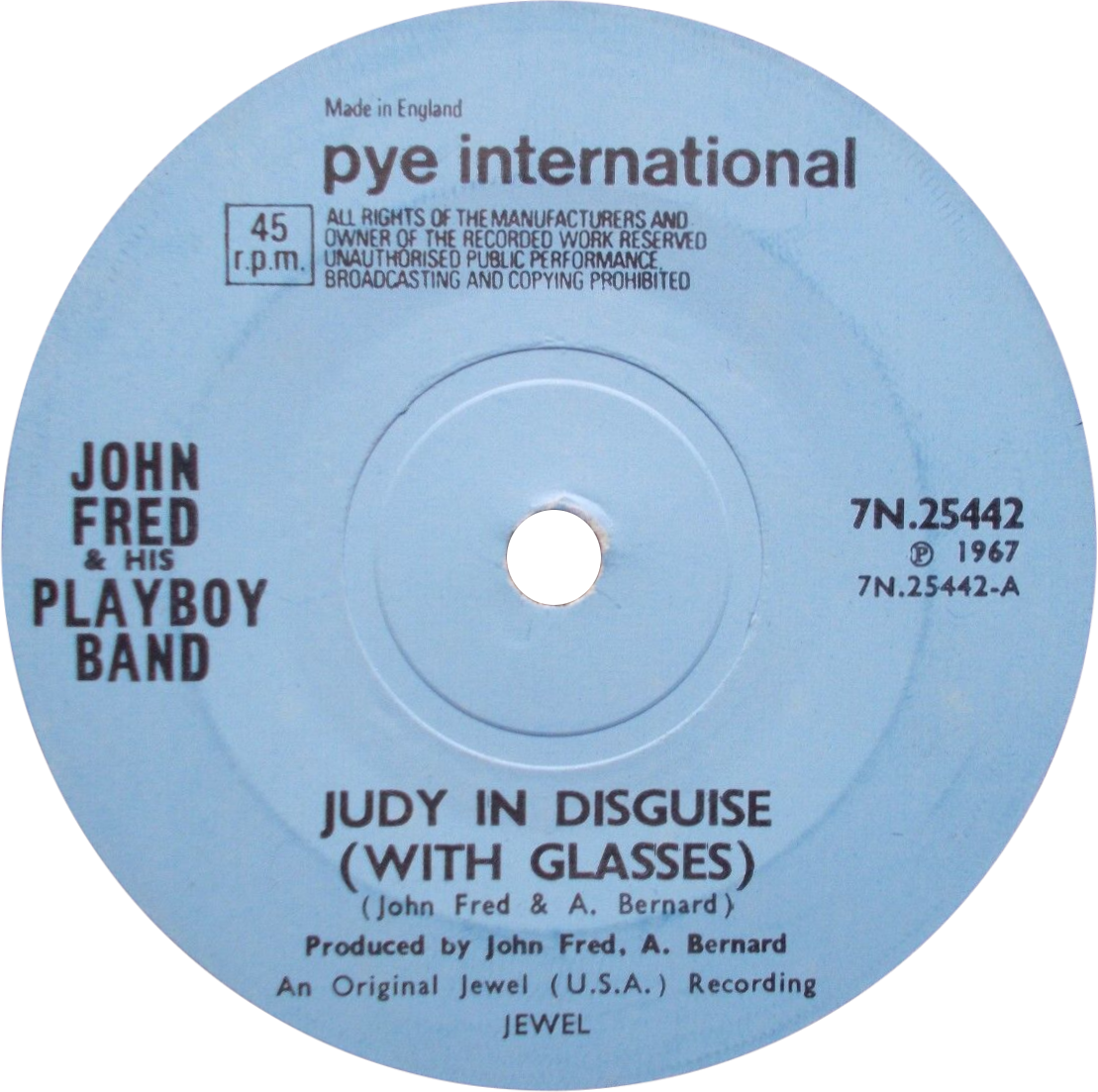
- Solid center variant of the UK single

Single by John Fred & His Playboy Band

from the album Agnes English
- B-side: "Out of Left Field"
- Released: October 1967
- Studio: Robin Hood Studios (Tyler, Texas)
- Genre: R&B; novelty; pop rock; bubblegum pop
- Length: 2:55
- Label: Paula
- Songwriters: John Fred Gourrier; Andrew Bernard
- Producers: John Fred Gourrier; Andrew Bernard

Official audio
- "Judy in Disguise (With Glasses)" on YouTube

"Judy in Disguise (With Glasses)" is a 1967 song that was a No. 1 hit for the Louisiana-based John Fred & His Playboy Band in early 1968. It was jointly composed by Fred and bandmate Andrew Bernard. Billboard magazine noted that it was recorded not in New York, Los Angeles, or Nashville, but "in a small studio in Tyler, Texas." (Robin Hood Studios, which is still going and is credited with some other notable historic recordings)

== Arrangements and content ==
The song features strings, brass, a sitar, piano, bass, guitar, drums, breathing sounds, and dissonant string sounds. Its title is a play on, and a mondegreen of, the Beatles song "Lucy in the Sky with Diamonds," which Fred believed was "Lucy in disguise with diamonds" upon first hearing the song.

The other members of the Playboy Band did not like the unusual and abrupt ending with Fred intoning the final line, "I guess I'll just take your glasses."

== Chart performance ==
In January 1968, the song reached No. 1 in the US and became a gold record. It also hit No. 1 in Germany, Switzerland, and Australia, and No. 3 in both Canada and the United Kingdom.

== Charts ==
=== Weekly charts ===
Chart (1967–1968)	Peak position
Australia (Go-Set)	1
Australia (Kent Music Report)	1
Austria (Ö3 Austria Top 40)	1
Belgium (Ultratop 50 Flanders)	1
Belgium (Ultratop 50 Wallonia)	1
Canada Top Singles (RPM)	3
Finland (Suomen virallinen lista)	32
France (IFOP)	31
Italy (FIMI)	44
Ireland (IRMA)	3
Japan (All Japan Pop 20)	6
Netherlands (Dutch Top 40)	2
Netherlands (Single Top 100)	3
New Zealand (Listener)	10
Norway (VG-lista)	3
South Africa (Springbok)	1
Spain (PROMUSICAE)	3
Switzerland (Schweizer Hitparade)	1
UK Singles (Official Charts)	3
US Billboard Hot 100	1
US Cash Box Top 100	1
West Germany (GfK)	1

=== Year-end charts ===
Chart (1968)	Rank
Australia (Kent Music Report)	14
Belgium (Ultratop Flanders)	26
Canada Top Singles (RPM)	24
South Africa (Springbok)	15
Switzerland (Schweizer Hitparade)	2
UK Singles	49
US Billboard Hot 100	25
US Cash Box Top 100	13

== Anthony Swete version ==
"Judy Disfrazada"

Song by Anthony Swete

from the album Anthony Swete
- B-side: "Doblame, Modelame"
- Released: 1968
- Label: Groove GS-8005
- Songwriter: J. Fred-A. Bernard

Anthony Swete recorded a version that was a hit in Argentina in 1968. It stayed on the charts for more than two months.

=== Background ===
Anthony Swete's version of "Judy in Disguise" was released as "Judy Disfrazada." Backed with "Doblame, Modelame" ("Bend Me, Shape Me"), written by Scott English and Larry Weiss, it was released on Groove GS-8005 in 1968.

=== Chart performance ===
As shown by Cash Box in the March 16 issue, Swete's version debuted at No. 10 on the Argentina's Best Sellers chart. It peaked at No. 5 on April 20. It was still in the chart at No. 17 on May 25. If there was any further chart action for the single in the following week, it could not be shown as Cash Box replaced Argentina's Best Sellers chart with the Brazil's Best Sellers (Rio de Janeiro) chart. On June 8, the Argentina's Best Sellers chart was back. There was no further chart action shown for the single in the top 20 range.

With Billboard, the chart progress of "Judy Disfrazada" showed a debut at No. 4 in the Buenos Aires Top Ten on the week of April 6, 1968. There was another version of "Judy Disfrazada" by Bárbara y Dick in the same chart. It was at No. 7. From April 13 to May 4, there was no Buenos Aires Top Ten category in Billboard Hits of the World section so further progress isn't shown. The Argentina section was now included in the May 11 issue. There was no charting of Swete's single in the top ten range.

=== Appearances ===
"Judy in Disguise" was included on Anthony Swete's self-titled album, released on Clan Celentano BF ES LP 7021 in 1970.

== Other versions ==
Gary Lewis and the Playboys recorded a version which was released on their Now! album, released on Liberty LST-7568 in 1968. Reviewed in the June 1 issue of Cash Box, "Judy in Disguise" and "Young Girl" were noted as the album's highlights.

Punk band Frank Xerox and the Copy Cats a.k.a. the Speedometors recorded a version of "Judy in Disguise". It was backed with "Rock Show" and released on Arista ARIST 160 in 1980.

== See also ==
- List of number-one hits of 1968 (Germany)
- List of number-one hits of 1968 (Switzerland)
- List of Hot 100 number-one singles of 1968 (U.S.)
- List of one-hit wonders in the United States § 1960s
