= Leibele Waldman =

American Jewish cantor (1907–1969)

- Born: Louis Waldman; June 22, 1907
- Died: August 28, 1969 (aged 62)

Louis "Leibele" Waldman (June 22, 1907 – August 28, 1969) was a Jewish cantor (“chazzan”), composer and actor, the only American-born cantor who may be considered as belonging to the great cantors of the so-called "golden age of Jewish cantorial music".

== Biography ==
Louis Waldman born to a family of Jewish Galician immigrants living on the Lower East Side of Manhattan in New York City. Early on he was recognized as a "wunderkind", officiating at the pulpit with a choir by the age of nine. He studied with local musician Shabtai Weingarten. His Yiddish name "Leibele" is the diminutive form of Leib. Waldman was the choir leader in the Wayne Street Synagogue of Jersey City (1924), the Livonia Street Synagogue of Brownsville (1925), the Flatbush Jewish Center (1925–26, with Cantor Samuel Katzman) and in the Galician Synagogue of Passaic in 1927.

In 1928 he assumed his first adult cantorial position, officiating on the High Holidays at the Beth Israel Synagogue on Columbia Street in Cambridge, Mass. In 1929 Waldman became the cantor of Temple Emanuel of Passaic, where he remained until 1934. Waldman then served one year at the Mount Eden Jewish Center in the Bronx.

At this point in his career, Waldman elected not to accept full-time cantorial positions, instead working on the High Holidays in many prominent venues, including Hunts Point Palace (1936 and 1937), the Bronx Winter Garden (1938), the Concord Hotel and Grossinger's Catskill Resort Hotel in the Catskill Mountains (New York), Laurel In The Pines in Lakewood (New Jersey) and The Breakers (New Jersey).

In addition to singing in the synagogue, Waldman developed an extensive film career, appearing in a dozen motion pictures, including “The Voice of Israel” where he appeared with world famous cantors Yossele Rosenblatt, Mordechai Herschman, and David Roitman. In addition he began to develop a radio career, singing for over a quarter of a century on the airwaves, appearing on stations WTBS, WMCA and WEVD, the station of the Forward Association.

During WWII, Waldman sang for Jewish troops stationed all over the United States. The Smithsonian Institution has preserved recordings of Waldman singing “Ich Dank Dir Gott far America” (I Thank You God for America), and the other was “Venn Di Zihn Vellen Kommen Tzurick” (When Your Son Will Come Back From the War). He also performed for many Jewish organizations, including Israel Bonds, the Jewish National Fund (JNF), and the Anti-Defamation League.

Waldman initiated a series of recordings, produced by Moses Asch, and issued on his label, ASCH Records. Waldman later recorded for Stinson, Disc, Banner, and following the second world war, RCA Victor. In the 1950s Waldman recorded for ABC and later for a private label, MALOH Records. During most of these years, he recorded with Oscar Julius as his conductor and Abraham Ellstein as his accompanist.

While still a young man, Waldman concertized with the renowned cantor Zavel Kwartin (in his eighties at the time) and Yossele Rosenblatt. In fact, Rosenblatt shared the stage with Waldman during his final concert in the United States before his death in Palestine in 1933.

Leibele Waldman died on August 28, 1969.

=== Legacy ===
In the words of Waldman's son Harvey:

Befriended and influenced by the great cantor Yossele Rosenblatt, Waldman had a distinctive style which still influences cantors today. A lyric baritone, Waldman's amazing vocal range, coloratura, flawless falsetto and sweet voice allowed him great flexibility interpreting prayers that have become "standards". His renditions of Ki Lekach Tov, Sarfe Maloh, Odom Y'sodo Meofer, L'fichoch Anachnu and Hineni (s'firah) are just a few of the many Waldman masterpieces.

== Filmography ==
- 1950 Yiddish Comedy Sketches
- 1941 Mazel Tov, Jews
- 1940 Motel, the Operator
- 1939 Kol Nidre
- 1937 I Want to Be a Mother
- 1936 Liebe und Leidenschaft [Love and Sacrifice]
- 1933 The Eternal Jew a/k/a Avrum Ovenu [Father Abraham] or Abraham Our Patriarch
- 1931 Khazen oyf'n Proyb [A Cantor on Trial] (Waldman plays multiple roles in this spoof of a synagogue committee in search of a cantor for the High Holiday services)

== Autobiography ==
Waldman published his autobiography, entitled Song Divine, in 1941.
