= Hold Me Tight (Johnny Nash song) =

Single by Johnny Nash

from the album Hold Me Tight
- B-side: "Cupid"
- Released: July 1968
- Genre: Reggae; rocksteady
- Length: 2:50
- Label: JAD
- Songwriter: Johnny Nash
- Producers: Arthur Jenkins, Johnny Nash

Johnny Nash singles chronology
"(I'm So) Glad You're My Baby" (1967)	"Hold Me Tight" (1968)	"You Got Soul" (1968)

"Hold Me Tight" is a song written and performed by Johnny Nash. It was featured on his 1968 album Hold Me Tight, was arranged by Arthur Jenkins and produced by Jenkins and Nash.

The single's B-side, "Cupid", reached #6 on the UK Singles Chart, #38 on the adult contemporary chart, and #39 on the U.S. pop chart in 1969.

== Chart performance ==
"Hold Me Tight" reached #1 on the Canadian chart. In the US, it went to #5 on the Billboard Hot 100 and #7 on the Cash Box Top 100 as well as #20 on the adult contemporary chart. It peaked at #21 on the U.S. R&B chart and #5 in the UK Singles Chart, all in 1968. The song ranked #37 on Billboard magazine's Top 100 singles of 1968 and #47 in Canada. On the New Zealand Listener charts it got to #10.

== Other charting versions ==
- Anthony Swete had a hit with the song in Argentina in 1969. According to Cash Box, the single was at no. 5 on the week of January 25. Its peak position of no. 5 was recorded by Cash Box in the March 15 issue. It was included on his Abrázame Fuerte album.
- Johnny Carver - as a single in 1969 which reached #32 on the U.S. country chart.
- Ali Campbell - as a single in 2007 which reached #140 on the UK Singles Chart.

== Other Cover Versions ==
- Anne Murray covered this song on her 1978 album Let's Keep It That Way.

== Popular culture ==
- The tune was also used in Score commercials.
