= Vik Records =

American record label

Vik Records was a subsidiary of RCA Victor established in April 1953. In the Billboard issue of the 11th of that month, it was announced that RCA was launching, a new, unnamed label that was the company's first to be distributed independently. Billboard opted to use the name "X" for the new label. The name was kept, as "X" began to hire a series of staffers and decide on a direction. The "X" Label was officially formed on April 20, 1953. Though wholly owned and controlled by RCA Victor, "X" had its own independent distribution. Joe Carlton was the head of the new label. RCA Victor spent the rest of the year trying to establish an identity for "X", eventually settling on cover records of R&B hits and quasi-R&B sides by artists such as The Three Chuckles, Eddie Fontaine, and Louis Jordan.

Other artists who released material on "X" included Helen O'Connell, Betty Clooney, Terry Fell, Helen Grayco, Gordon Jenkins, Richard Maltby Sr., Norman Petty, and Andy Williams, whose first solo records were issued on this label.

On January 1, 1956, the "X" label adopted the name Vik and began reissuing the records that were in print on the label accordingly. Among the artists on Vik were Marty Gold, Gisele MacKenzie (whose biggest hit, "Hard to Get" was issued on "X"), Pat Suzuki, Lee Denson and, more successfully, the R&B duo Mickey & Sylvia.

Journalist and executive Bob Rolontz, who had been responsible for another RCA Victor subsidiary, Groove Records, and was then put in charge of Vik, later said: "The Vik label was probably the worst collection of talent in the world... There was no way we could pull Vik out of that hole. And after about a year, the RCA people decided to discontinue Vik." The Vik label was closed on November 1, 1958. While some artists had their contracts transferred to RCA Victor, others, like Brook Benton and Teddy Randazzo, left to respectively join the Mercury and ABC-Paramount labels.

== See also ==
- List of record labels
