= James Alexander Hamilton (music writer) =

James Alexander Hamilton (1785–1845) was an English compiler of musical instruction books.

== Life ==
The son of a dealer in old books, Hamilton was born in London. He taught himself from books in his father's shop, acquiring a knowledge of languages and music. He translated major works in foreign languages, as well as compiling instructional and music theory books.

Hamilton sold his copyrights, drank, and died in poverty on 2 August 1845.

== Works ==
Significant translations by Hamilton included Cherubini's Counterpoint and Fugue, and treatises by Pierre Baillot, Bartolomeo Campagnoli, Carl Czerny, Jan Ladislav Dussek, Pierre Rode, and Johann Gottfried Vierling. His Pianoforte Tutor reached its 13th edition in 1849, and saw very frequent reprintings over half a century. Others publications by Hamilton were: Dictionary of ... Musical Terms (1836?); Invention, Exposition, Development, and Concatenation of Musical Ideas (1838); Johann Nepomuk Maelzel's Metronome; Friedrich Kalkbrenner's Handguide; Introduction to Choral Singing (1841); and Method for Double Bass.

In parts vii. to xi. of D'Almaine & Co.'s "Library of Musical Knowledge" appeared Hamilton's Choral Singing as adapted to Church Psalmody, 1841–3; Sacred Harmony, 1843, and some primers.
