= Guava Jelly (song) =

1971 song by Bob Marley and the Wailers

Single by Bob Marley and the Wailers
- B-side: "Redder Then Red"
- Released: 1971
- Recorded: 1971
- Genre: Reggae; rocksteady
- Length: 2:18
- Label: Tuff Gong; Green Door
- Songwriters: Bob Marley; Bunny Livingston
- Producer: Bob Marley

Bob Marley and the Wailers singles chronology
"Lick Samba" (1971)	"Guava Jelly" (1971)	"Craven Choke Puppy" (1971)

"Guava Jelly" is a song recorded by the Jamaican group Bob Marley and the Wailers. It was released as a 7" vinyl single through Tuff Gong and Green Door Records. It was issued commercially with B-side track "Redder Then Red", which was misspelled on its initial printing, in 1971. It was written and produced by Marley and features uncredited lyrical contributions from Bunny Livingston. A reggae composition like the majority of Marley's works, "Guava Jelly" contains a rocksteady and island-like production with lyrics loosely based around sexual intercourse. His use of the term "guava jelly" was likely referring to a specific type of sexual lubricant. It was favorably viewed by several reviewers, with many of them finding the composition to be sexual and about love. The group placed "Guava Jelly" on several compilation albums, including Africa Unite: The Singles Collection in 2005, and Owen Gray and Herbie Mann created their own versions in 1974 and 1975, respectively.

American artists Johnny Nash and Barbra Streisand also recorded "Guava Jelly" and released their versions as commercial singles in 1972 and 1974, respectively. Nash's version was featured on his eleventh studio album, I Can See Clearly Now (1972), and was distributed in the 7" format in Jamaica and South Africa as the record's fourth and final single. Rita Marley, Bob's wife, was upset that Nash had recorded it since he might be credited for the single's success and not Marley. Streisand's rendition was included on her sixteenth studio album, ButterFly (1974), and released as the record's lead single on 16 December 1974. It divided music critics in the way that several thought her voice was not suited for reggae music. In 1991 the singer would appear on Larry King Live and admit her disappointment in ButterFly and the songs that appeared on it.

== Background and composition ==
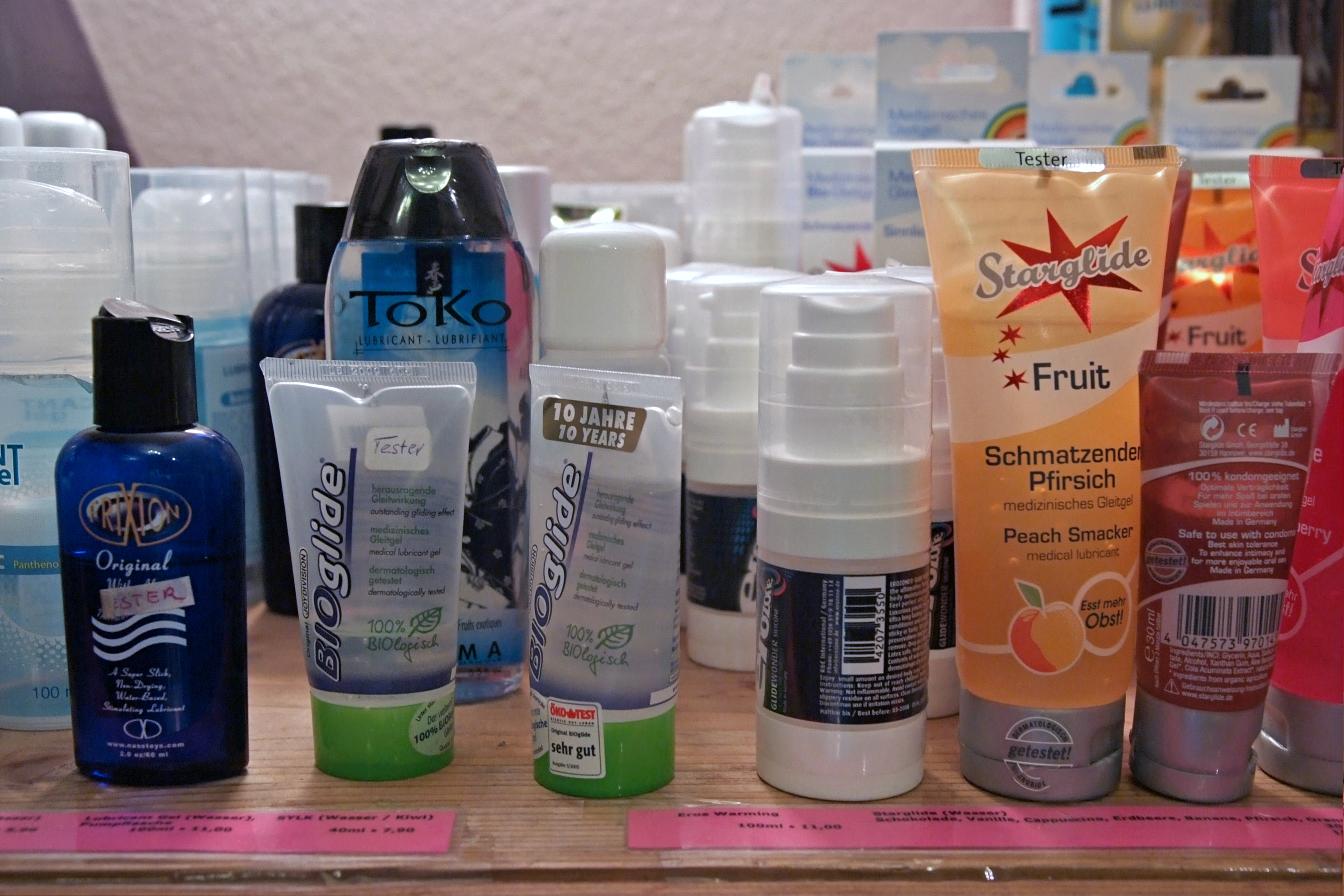
Marley's mention of the term "guava jelly" may be referring to the use of lubricant products during sexual intercourse.

"Guava Jelly" was released in two different formats in 1971. The standard edition includes the track as both the A-side and B-side tracks, while the version released in the United Kingdom includes "Redder Than Red" as its B-side, although it was misspelled as "Redder Then Red" on the release. It was written and produced by Marley, although longtime collaborator and friend Bunny Livingston contributed by writing additional lyrics and was uncredited for his work. It is written in the key of C major with Marley's vocals ranging from G_{4} to A_{5}; it is additionally accompanied by the instrumentation of a piano and a guitar.

A reggae and rocksteady recording, "Guava Jelly" features influence from Jamaican music, which is reflected in the lyrics; Marley wanted the sound of the single to more heavy on rocksteady than reggae, although he does refer to it as "moderate reggae" in later years. Mervin Stoddart, who wrote Bob Marley's Lyrics: Understanding and Explaining Their Pedagogical Value, stated that the single was inspired and emphasized by the "sweetness of love making". He also stated that "Non-Jamaican listeners might concentrate 'more on the beauty of the tune rather than the slightly risqué lyrics'". Authors Ian McCann and Harry Hawke predicted that "innocent" listeners would not recognize the explicit lyrics because of its "island charm". Marley begins the track by singing the line: "You said you love me" and follows with: "I said I love you". By incorporating "the concerns of soul" into the lyrics, he sings into the chorus: "Here I am / Me said, 'Come rub in 'pon me belly' / 'With you guava jelly, Damsel'". His use of the word Damsel refers to a woman in a relationship experiencing "emotional pain". Furthermore, authors Monique Guillory and Richard Green found the song's title refer to a type of sexual lubricant.

== Reception ==
Writer John Masouri found that "Guava Jelly" was one of Marley's most commercial recordings from 1971, and used Nash and Streisand's admiration as evidence. Agreeing, Chris Salewciz (who wrote a biography about Marley in 2014) described the composition as "sexy". Jo-Anne Greene from AllMusic described the composition as a "rich, romantic piece" and enjoyed Marley's "fiery, sexy performance". She later noticed its impact in the music industry by writing: "'Jelly' quivered its way across the sound systems and beyond. In later years Jelly would be covered time and again by some of the biggest names in the music business."

== Promotion and later versions ==
The single has been featured on several of the group's compilation albums and greatest hits albums. Marley first included "Guava Jelly" on his four-disc box set, titled Songs of Freedom (1992). Alongside its appearance, the succeeding track is a medley of several songs: "Guava Jelly", "This Train", "Cornerstone", "Comma Comma", "Dewdrops", "Stir It Up", and "L'M". 1999's The Complete Bob Marley & the Wailers 1967-1972, Part 3 album also features the single and the previously unreleased demo titled "Guava". Grooving Kingston 12 (2004) and Africa Unite: The Singles Collection (2005) include "Guava Jelly" as well.

"Guava Jelly" was licensed to several other singers after its initial release in 1971. Jamaican singer Owen Gray recorded "Guava Jelly" but added his own "modern reggae" touch to it. He released it as a promotional single in 1974 through Island Records with B-side track "Please Don't Let Me Go", which he wrote and produced himself. Flautist Herbie Mann's 1975 album Discothèque featured an instrumental version of "Guava Jelly".

== Track listings ==
Standard edition 7" single

- A1 "Guava Jelly" – 2:18
- B1 "Guava Jelly" – 2:18

United Kingdom 7" single

- A1 "Guava Jelly" – 2:18
- B1 "Redder Then Red" – 2:51

== Johnny Nash version ==
"Guava Jelly"

Single by Johnny Nash

from the album I Can See Clearly Now
- B-side: "The Fish & the Alley of Destruction"; "Ooh Baby You've Been Good to Me"
- Released: 23 February 1973
- Recorded: 1972
- Genre: Reggae
- Length: 3:16
- Label: Federal
- Songwriters: Bob Marley; Bunny Livingston
- Producer: Johnny Nash

Johnny Nash singles chronology
"There Are More Questions Than Answers" (1972)	"Guava Jelly" (1973)	"My Merry-Go-Round" (1973)

=== Background and release ===
American singer-songwriter Johnny Nash created a new version of "Guava Jelly" for his eleventh studio album, I Can See Clearly Now (1972). It was first used as the B-side to his previous single, "There Are More Questions Than Answers", which was also released in 1972, and was produced by Nash. Rita Marley, Bob's wife, was upset that JAD Records lent the track for Nash to cover, as the label "wanted to make a star out of Johnny Nash, not of Bob Marley". Additionally, Steve Sullivan (author of Encyclopedia of Great Popular Song Recordings, Volume 1) incorrectly claimed that Marley was commissioned to write "Guava Jelly" solely for Nash. However, Sullivan also writes that the success of Nash's version allotted Marley enough money to start his own record label, which he had always wanted to do. The label was eventually created and became known as Tuff Gong.

Nash's rendition of "Guava Jelly" was released exclusively in Jamaica by Federal Records on 23 February 1973. The 7" single features the aforementioned title as the A-side and "The Fish & the Alley of Destruction" as its B-side. The following year, CBS Records International released it in South Africa, but instead with "Ooh Baby You've Been Good to Me" replacing the previously mentioned B-side. Sullivan took a liking to Nash's release, finding him definitely influenced by Marley and writing that "Nash's inviting high tenor voice, and lyrics designed to banish negativity and unleash hope" are able to create "pure pleasure" whenever its played on the radio. On the 2010 British miniseries This Is England '86, "Guava Jelly" was played on selected episodes and features on the accompanying soundtrack in 2010.

=== In other media ===
Nash has since placed "Guava Jelly" on several of his future releases. The single was first included on 1974 compilation album, Greatest Hits. Then "Guava Jelly" has inclusion on The Johnny Nash Collection (1977) and The Johnny Nash Album (1980), released by Sony Music and CBS Records International, respectively. It was also featured as track ten on his 1981 collection of singles, titled Stir It Up; the record was released exclusively by Hallmark Recordings. Other albums that feature his version of "Guava Jelly" include The Reggae Collection (1993), The Best of Johnny Nash (1996), Superhits (2004), and Collections (2006). The Trojan Records compiled This Is Reggae Music: The Golden Era 1960-1975 and released it on 26 October 2004; three songs by Nash were included: "Guava Jelly" on disc three, and "I Can See Clearly Now" and "Stir It Up" on disc four.

=== Track listings ===
Jamaica 7" single

- A1 "Guava Jelly" – 3:16
- B1 "The Fish & the Alley of Destruction" – 4:10

South Africa 7" single

- A1 "Guava Jelly" – 3:10
- B1 "Ooh Baby You've Been Good to Me" – 2:24

== Barbra Streisand version ==
"Guava Jelly"

Single by Barbra Streisand

from the album ButterFly
- B-side: "Love in the Afternoon"; "Life on Mars"; "Amor al Atardecer"
- Released: 16 December 1974
- Recorded: 1974
- Studio: A&M Studios (Los Angeles, CA)
- Genre: Reggae; pop-soul
- Length: 2:55
- Label: Columbia
- Songwriters: Bob Marley; Bunny Livingston
- Producer: Jon Peters

Barbra Streisand singles chronology
"All in Love Is Fair" (1974)	"Guava Jelly" (1974)	"Jubilation" (1975)

=== Background and recording ===
American vocalist Barbra Streisand recorded "Guava Jelly" for ButterFly (1974), her sixteenth studio album. Marley licensed the track to Streisand in 1974, a year where he took a break from recording music, in hopes of exposing more fans to his music. According to author Klive Walker, the singer created the cover in order to "decorat[e] her songs with a fresh 'tropical' beat". Similarly, other publications felt she released it during the growing popularity of reggae music in the United States. However, Streisand instead hoped for achieving a record featuring diverse and "eclectic" material, straying away from her previous works of the pop and rock genres.

A critic for Stereo Review determined that Streisand sounds like Aretha Franklin on "Guava Jelly", singing with a more sexual tone previously unheard of in her catalogue. Streisand released the single in a 7" vinyl format on 16 December 1974 in three territories: the United States, the Netherlands, and Spain. The US version features B-side track "Love in the Afternoon", the Netherlands release includes a cover of David Bowie's "Life on Mars", and the Spain edition has the Spanish version of "Love in the Afternoon" (titled "Amor al Atardecer"). A promotional release in the United States has the mono and stereo versions of "Guava Jelly".

=== Critical reception ===
Streisand's version of "Guava Jelly" divided music critics. A writer for Billboard was enthusiastic of the release, writing, "Barbra takes the great Bob Marley reggae cut and commercializes it somewhat, though the flavor is still there. Good soulful backup and reggae type organ help make this an almost certain bet for heavy top 40 play". Author Derek Winnert referred to Streisand's version as a "success" in his 1996 book Barbra Streisand. However, an editor for Boating disliked Streisand's version and urged the public to "ignore" it, joking that it "does not belong in [...] our stateroom". A reviewer from Broadcasting disliked everything about her version, stating, "The Streisand voice and name alone might be enough to make a hit out of any of her single releases, but with the first single from her best-selling ButterFly album, the singer is taking no chances."

Years after its initial release, Streisand took to Larry King Live in 1991 and announced her displeasure with ButterFly and the songs on it. Biographer Tom Santopietro wrote that "Guava Jelly" and album track "Grandma's Hands" were among the bad songs on the album. He also stated that "Broadway divas do not take naturally to singing 'Ooh baby, here I am. Come rub it on my belly like guava jelly'". In agreement, writer Shaun Considine claimed that one unknown critic in particular panned the track, stating "Streisand was not born to sing reggae", while another joked that he/she had "no comment" to make in response to the release. Ben Gerson, writing for Rolling Stone, found the singer to be "unconvincingly animal" throughout her rendition. He continued, "Being beautiful, romantic and desirable have not come to her so effortlessly that she can easily throw them over for the sake a little authentic, malodorous sweat."

=== Track listings ===
United States 7" single

- A1 "Guava Jelly" – 2:55
- B1 "Love in the Afternoon" – 4:06

United States promotional 7" single

- A1 "Guava Jelly" (Stereo) – 2:55
- B1 "Guava Jelly" (Mono) – 2:55

Netherlands 7" single

- A1 "Guava Jelly" – 3:19
- B1 "Life on Mars" – 3:13

Spain 7" single

- A1 "Guava Jelly" – 2:55
- B1 "Amor al Atardecer" – 4:06

=== Charts ===
Chart performance for "Guava Jelly"
Chart (1975)	Peak position
US Cash Box Top 100 Singles	83
