= Funny Lady (soundtrack) =

Soundtrack album by Barbra Streisand
- Released: March 15, 1975
- Length: 47:25
- Label: Arista
- Producer: Peter Matz

Barbra Streisand chronology
ButterFly (1974)	Funny Lady (1975)	Lazy Afternoon (1975)

Singles from Funny Lady
- 1. "How Lucky Can You Get" Released: April 1975

Funny Lady is the soundtrack album of the 1975 musical film of the same title, starring Barbra Streisand. Released by Arista Records on March 15, 1975, arranged, conducted, and coordinated by Peter Matz, the album's fifteen tracks are performed by Streisand, James Caan, and Ben Vereen. A sequel to the 1968 musical comedy-drama Funny Girl, the songs extend the semi-biographical account of the life of American performer Fanny Brice. Funny Lady also included songs written by Brice's third husband Billy Rose. New music by Kander and Ebb included "How Lucky Can You Get", the album's only single, released in April 1975.

The soundtrack divided music critics, with some negative notes on Caan's singing abilities, while others found it a worthy companion of the film. Commercially, it entered the charts in Australia, Canada and the United States, peaking within the Billboard 200 top ten in the latter country. The Recording Industry Association of America certified the album Gold for shipments exceeding 500,000 copies in late 1975. The album was first issued on CD in 1990, adhering to the original vinyl album sequence, then in 1998 with alternate tracks and the single release of "How Lucky Can You Get" as a bonus track.

== Background and promotion ==
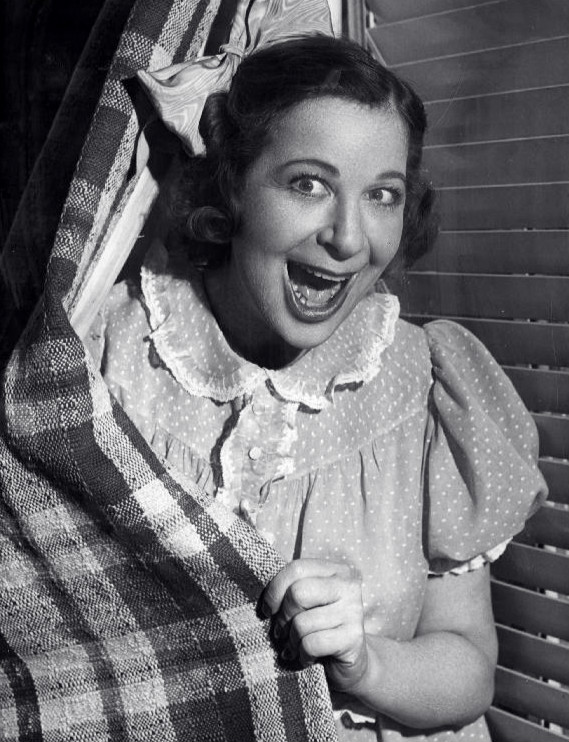
Streisand reprised her role as Fanny Brice in both Funny Lady and the soundtrack.

Due to her contract with Ray Stark, Streisand was required to reprise her role as Fanny Brice in the sequel to Funny Girl (1968), which became Funny Lady. Accompanying the 1975 film was the official soundtrack and one of the first records to be released by Arista Records, a new label created by record producer Clive Davis. Davis later revealed in his autobiographical book, The Soundtrack of My Life, that Streisand was the perfect singer for the soundtrack as she was "the top female singer-actress in the world" and would likely be a good first effort to be released by a newly founded record company. The soundtrack to Funny Lady was released on March 15, 1975, by Arista Records, despite Streisand being signed to Columbia Records. It features fifteen songs, with a majority of them being brand new tracks written by the songwriting duo of Fred Ebb and John Kander. Bay Cities Records, a subsidiary of Arista, issued the compact disc for Funny Lady in 1990. Arista re-released the album on May 19, 1998, with alternate tracks of "Let's Hear It For Me" and "Great Day" as well as the single version of "How Lucky can You Get" as a bonus track. The Arista reissue reordered the track listing to reflect their sequence in the film. It would be reissued in February 2009 on the Sony Legacy label.

"How Lucky Can You Get" was released as the soundtrack's only commercial single in April 1975. It peaked on the Adult Contemporary charts in both the United States and Canada, peaking at numbers 27 and 19, respectively. The songwriting, by Ebb and Kander, was widely praised by music critics; at the 48th Academy Awards, the single was nominated for the Academy Award for Best Original Song but lost to Keith Carradine's "I'm Easy" from the 1975 film Nashville. "How Lucky Can You Get" also lost to "I'm Easy" when nominated for Best Original Song at the 33rd Golden Globe Awards.

== Composition ==
The album features a total of fifteen songs, with eleven of them performed solely by Streisand, two of them ("Me and My Shadow" and the medley of "It's Only a Paper Moon" and "I Like Her") are sung by costar James Caan, one of them is by Ben Vereen, and the final one is a duet between Streisand and Vereen; Peter Matz executively produced the entire album, in addition to serving as the audio arranger and conductor. Lead single "How Lucky Can You Get It" features "sarcastic" and "ironic" lyrics to capture the character of Brice as accurately as possible. The soundtrack itself has been described as a collection of "rejuvenating classics" by author Ethan Mordden. The duet "So Long Honey Lamb" is another newly recorded song by Ebb and Kander, followed by "I Found a Million Dollar Baby (in a Five and Ten Cent Store)", which was once performed by Brice during her musical Billy Rose's Crazy Quilt. Track four, "Isn't This Better", is a love song about the relationship of Brice and Billy Rose. "Me and My Shadow" is a solo by Caan, covering the original version which was written by Dave Dreyer, Al Jolson, and Rose. Streisand's "If I Love Again" is a ballad with a "wide range" and "disjunct melody", which was considered "unusual" for a pop song. "I Got a Code in My Doze" was written by Rose and Arthur Fields while "(It's Gonna Be A) Great Day" is a "gospel-rock style" track whose melody was rewritten by Streisand to better suit her.

The album's ninth track, "Blind Date", was recorded quickly during a strict three-week recording schedule. "Am I Blue" was finalized during the same aforementioned period and was originally written by Harry Akst. Two corresponding medleys, one of "It's Only a Paper Moon" and "I Like Him" by Streisand and "It's Only a Paper Moon" and "I Like Her" by Caan, are back-to-back tracks. "More Than You Know", which was originally included on Streisand's Simply Streisand album in 1967, follows and was also used as the B-side track for the commercial release of "How Lucky Can You Get". Vereen's solo of "Clap Hands! Here Comes Charlie" precedes "Let's Hear It for Me", which is the album's closing track and an updated version of the Funny Girl original "Don't Rain on My Parade".

== Critical reception ==
Professional ratings
Review scores
Source	Rating
AllMusic; 1975 version	2/5 stars
AllMusic; 1998 version	3/5 stars

Funny Lady has received mixed reviews from music critics. A critic from Stereo Review was pleased with Streisand's Funny Lady, stating that it "will surely bring out the ravening glutton I suspect is lurking in all who are her fondest fans". However, the reviewer did warn that soundtrack did not contain anything for those of a "dispassionate and temperate nature". Also positive was a critic from Film, who called the album "more satisfying than the film". Initially, AllMusic's William Ruhlmann awarded the album 2 out of 5 stars. He was critical of Caan's singing abilities, finding it hard "to endure the singing of James Caan". In his review of the 1998 reissued CD, Ruhlmann listed "Am I Blue" as one of the best tracks on the album; he called it the "chief virtue of the soundtrack [...], even if she sometimes camped [it] up". Allison J. Waldman, author of The Barbra Streisand Scrapbook, was disappointed by the soundtrack, claiming that it is more like a "hodgepodge of a soundtrack". She also stated that it was "not nearly as well-produced" as the soundtrack for the predecessor, Funny Girl (1968).

== Commercial performance ==
Allison J. Waldman predicted that the commercial success of the soundtrack was due to Streisand's previous role and performance in the original film, Funny Girl. In the United States, the album debuted at number 75 on the Billboard 200 chart for the week ending March 29, 1975. It continued to climb the chart in that country for several weeks before peaking at number six on May 10. It spent four weeks within the top ten of chart, and a total of 25 weeks altogether. The Recording Industry Association of America certified the soundtrack Gold for shipments upwards of 500,000 sales on September 8, 1975. On Canada's Top Albums chart conducted and published by RPM, the record debuted at number 90 during the week of April 12, 1975. Similar to its progress in the United States, it soared up the charts for several weeks before peaking at number 17 on May 17 of the same year. It spent a total of 12 consecutive weeks charting in Canada, with its final position being number 56 on June 28. It also charted in Australia, where it peaked at number 50 according to the Kent Music Report.

== Track listing ==
All songs performed by Barbra Streisand except where noted.

Funny Lady – Standard edition
No.	Title	Writer(s)	Length
1.	"How Lucky Can You Get"	Fred Ebb; John Kander	4:46
2.	"So Long Honey Lamb" (performed by Barbra Streisand and Ben Vereen)	Ebb; Kander	3:10
3.	"I Found a Million Dollar Baby (in a Five and Ten Cent Store)"	Harry Warren	2:55
4.	"Isn't This Better"	Ebb; Kander	3:25
5.	"Me and My Shadow" (performed by James Caan)	Dave Dreyer; Al Jolson; Billy Rose	3:00
6.	"If I Love Again"	Jack Murray; Ben Oakland	2:55
7.	"I Got a Code in My Doze"	Arthur Fields; Rose	1:05
8.	"(It's Gonna Be A) Great Day"	Edward Eliscu; Rose; Vincent Youmans	5:14
9.	"Blind Date"	Ebb; Kander	4:55
10.	"Am I Blue"	Harry Akst	3:20
11.	"It's Only a Paper Moon"/"I Like Him"	Harold Arlen; Kander; E.Y. "Yip" Harburg; Ebb; Rose	1:05
12.	"It's Only a Paper Moon"/"I Like Her" (performed by Caan)	Arlen; Kander; Harburg; Ebb; Rose	2:37
13.	"More Than You Know"	Eliscu; Rose; Youmans	2:25
14.	"Clap Hands! Here Comes Charlie" (performed by Vereen)	Ballard MacDonald; Joseph Meyer; Rose	2:10
15.	"Let's Hear It for Me"	Ebb; Kander	3:13
Total length:			47:25

Funny Lady – 1998 reissued CD edition
No.	Title	Length
1.	"Blind Date"	4:57
2.	"More Than You Know"	2:28
3.	"It's Only a Paper Moon"/"I Like Him"	1:05
4.	"It's Only a Paper Moon"/"I Like Her"	2:37
5.	"I Found a Million Dollar Baby (In a Five and Ten Cent Store)"	1:59
6.	"So Long Honey Lamb"	3:12
7.	"I Got a Code in My Doze"	1:10
8.	"Clap Hands! Here Comes Charlie"	2:14
9.	"(It's Gonna Be A) Great Day"	5:38
10.	"How Lucky Can You Get"	4:48
11.	"Am I Blue"	3:21
12.	"Isn't This Better"	3:29
13.	"If I Love Again"	2:59
14.	"Let's Hear It for Me"	4:04
15.	"Me and My Shadow"	3:03
16.	"How Lucky Can You Get" (Finale)	3:55
Total length:		50:09

== Personnel ==
Credits adapted from the liner notes of the CD edition of Funny Lady.

- Harry Akst – songwriting (track 10)
- Harold Arlen – songwriting (tracks 11, 12)
- James Caan – vocals (tracks 4, 12)
- Dave Dreyer – songwriting (track 5)
- Fred Ebb – songwriting (tracks 1, 2, 4, 9, 11, 12, 15)
- Edward Eliscu – songwriting (tracks 8, 13)
- Arthur Fields – songwriting (track 7)
- E.Y. "Yip" Harburg – songwriting (tracks 11, 12)
- Al Jolson – songwriting (track 5)
- John Kander – songwriting (tracks 1, 2, 4, 9, 11, 12, 15)
- Ballard MacDonald – songwriting (track 14)
- Peter Matz – production, arrangements, conduction
- Joseph Meyer – songwriting (track 14)
- Jack Murray – songwriting (track 6)
- Ben Oakland – songwriting (track 6)
- Billy Rose – songwriting (tracks 5, 7, 8, 11, 12, 13, 14)
- Barbra Streisand – vocals (tracks 1, 2, 3, 4, 6, 7, 8, 9, 10, 11, 13, 15)
- Ben Vereen – vocals (tracks 2, 14)
- Harry Warren – songwriting (track 3)
- Vincent Youmans – songwriting (tracks 8, 13)

== Charts ==
Chart performance for Funny Lady
Chart (1975)	Peak position
Australia Albums (Kent Music Report)	50
Canada Top Albums/CDs (RPM)	17
US Billboard 200	6

== Certifications ==
Region	Certification	Certified units/sales
United States (RIAA)	Gold	500,000^{^}
^{^} Shipments figures based on certification alone.
