= Rock Me Baby =

Rock Me Baby may refer to:

- "Rock Me Baby" (song), a blues standard, notably recorded by B. B. King in 1964
- "Rock Me Baby" (Johnny Nash song), 1985
- Rock Me Baby (album), a 1972 album by David Cassidy, or the title song
- Rock Me Baby (TV series), a 2003–2004 U.S. comedy/drama series

== See also ==
- "Rock Your Baby", 1974 George McCrae song
- "Rock Me", 1989 Riva song
- "Wagon Wheel", 2004 single with the line "Rock me mama"
- Love Me Baby (disambiguation)
