= How Lucky Can You Get =

Single by Barbra Streisand

from the album Funny Lady
- B-side: "More Than You Know"
- Released: April 1975
- Recorded: 1975
- Length: 3:53
- Label: Arista
- Songwriters: Fred Ebb; John Kander
- Producer: Peter Matz

Barbra Streisand singles chronology
"Jubilation" (1975)	"How Lucky Can You Get" (1975)	"My Father's Song" (1975)

"How Lucky Can You Get" is a song recorded by American vocalist Barbra Streisand for the official soundtrack to the 1975 film Funny Lady. It was released as a 7" single in April 1975 through Arista Records. The song was written by Fred Ebb and John Kander, while production was handled by Peter Matz. "How Lucky Can You Get" is one of the new songs on the soundtrack, with its origins coming from Fanny Brice, the character Streisand portrays in the aforementioned film. The music pertains to Brice herself, particularly the sarcastic nature of the lyrics that are accompanied by an "insistent" melody and production. It was suggested that the pattern of the lyrics may have been influenced by Giacomo Puccini's 1896 opera, La bohème.

In terms of its popularity, the song is the most recognizable one from Funny Lady. "How Lucky Can You Get" was well received by music critics, who enjoyed the musical-esque qualities of the production, particularly Streisand's performance. It was nominated for the Academy Award for Best Original Song and the Golden Globe Award for Best Original Song, but it lost both times to Keith Carradine's "I'm Easy" from the 1975 film Nashville. It entered the Adult Contemporary charts in both the United States and Canada, peaking at numbers 27 and 19, respectively.

== Background and release ==
According to the liner notes that came with the 1990 soundtrack CD release of Funny Lady, the origins of "How Lucky Can You Get" stem from a song with the same name that Fanny Brice (the character portrayed in the movie) had once performed live. The song (and several others for the soundtrack) was written by Fred Ebb and John Kander. It was produced by Peter Matz, who also took care of arranging the track's audio. Streisand recorded "How Lucky Can You Get" during a three-week-long recording schedule in 1975. It was released in April 1975 as a 7" single through Arista Records in both the United States and Italy. Both versions contains "How Lucky Can You Get" as the A-side track while "More Than You Know" is used as the B-side. However, the Italian release features a longer version of "How Lucky Can You Get" as the A-side.

== Composition and lyrics ==
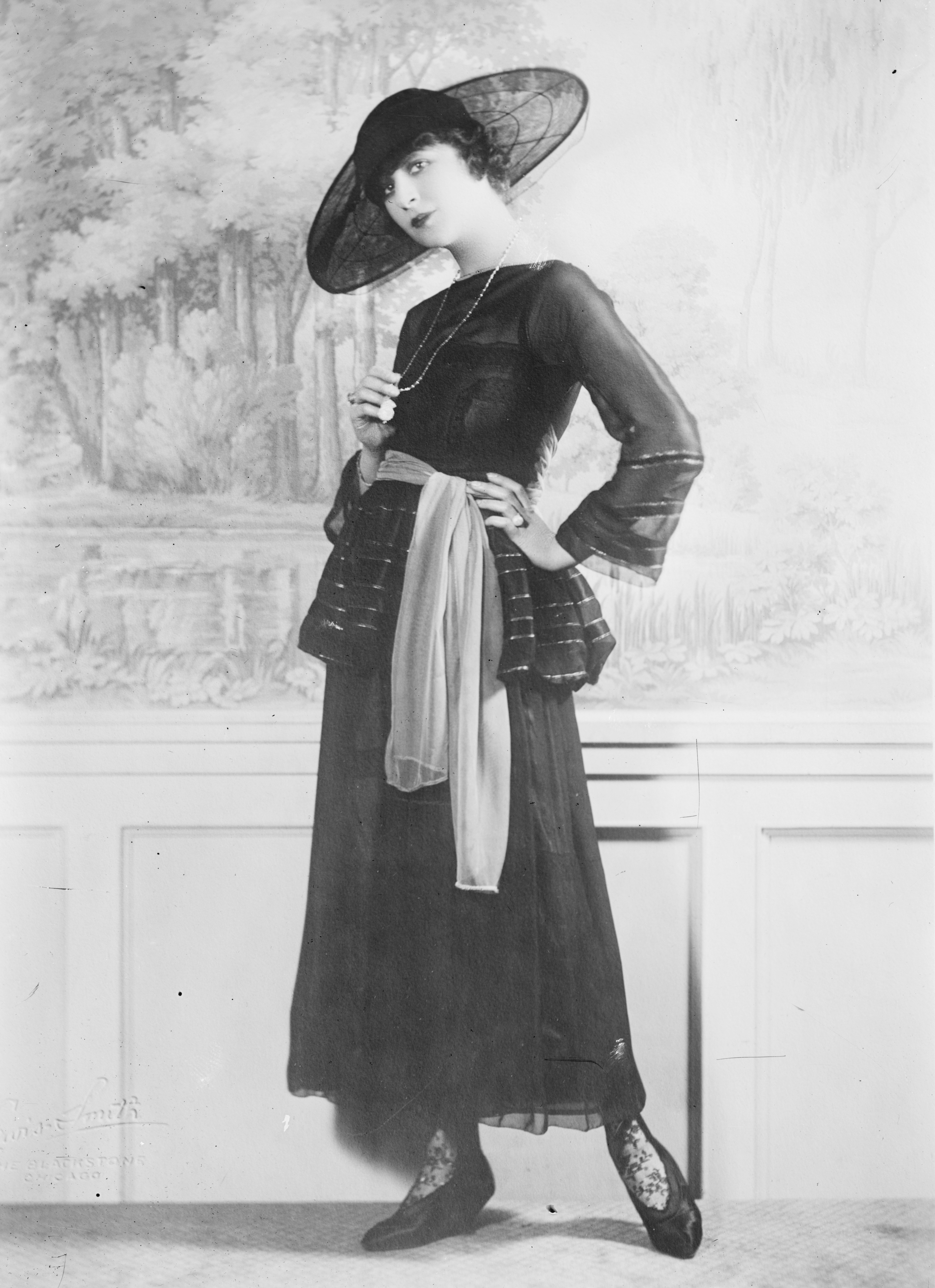
The lyrics to "How Lucky Can You Get" pertain to Fanny Brice, the character that Streisand portrays in Funny Lady.

The song's lyrics pertain to Fanny Brice, the character who Streisand portrays in Funny Lady. "How Lucky Can You Get" is written in the key of C major with Streisand's vocals ranging from F_{3} to F_{5}; it is additionally accompanied by the sole instrumentation of a piano. Through the use of a four-bar phrase and increasing changes in its key to build up suspense and anticipation, the chromatic melody is able to fully support the strength of the lyrics and sound "insistent" to the listener. To match the written aspects of the songs, Ebb and Kander came up with "sarcastic" lyrics to suit the character of Brice accurately.

In terms of the lyrics, Streisand opens the song by humming the first few lines ("Badodiodiodi / Odiodo"), followed by the chorus, where she questions, "Gee, whee, wow, how lucky? / How lucky can you get?". The short musical interlude in "How Lucky Can You Get" switches from a four-bar to an eight-bar phrase, just as it "returns to its original key" and the lyrics become "outwardly straightforward". During the final two verses of the song, Streisand talks to herself and questions, "Hey there, gorgeous! / Big success! / What's your secret? / Just lucky I guess". James Leve, who wrote the biography book Kander and Ebb, referred to these lyrics as ironic and claimed that the music that accompanies the aforementioned four lines was borrowed from Giacomo Puccini's 1896 opera, La bohème.

== Critical reception and legacy ==
Perhaps the most recognizable song from Funny Lady, "How Lucky Can You Get" received positive reviews from music critics. Author Leve recalled that the song "exemplifie[d] Kander and Ebb's approach to musical theater", referring to its use in the film. During the segment of Funny Lady where Streisand is shown performing the song, author David Craig wrote that she "sings it in the simplest possible performance" but does not need any "pizzazz to corroborate its showstopping status". Peter Filichia, who wrote a series of books dealing with broadway musicals, claimed that singing "How Lucky Can You Get" and working with Kander and Ebb was perfect for her. Who also joked that the title of the song "perfectly summed up Streisand's experience with Funny Girl". Music researcher Thomas S. Hischak was favorable to the song on the soundtrack and labeled it as "breezy". Referring to its popularity, Alan Neff felt that "How Lucky Can You Get" provided a sense of "exhibitionism" to the listener.

Both Ebb and Kander were nominated for several awards for their songwriting credits on "How Lucky Can You Get". At the 48th Academy Awards, the single was nominated for the Academy Award for Best Original Song but lost to Keith Carradine's "I'm Easy" from the film Nashville. "How Lucky Can You Get" also lost to "I'm Easy" when nominated for Best Original Song at the 33rd Golden Globe Awards.

On 6 May 2007, Caroline O'Connor performed in Derek Williams' arrangement of "How Lucky Can You Get" at her Royal Albert Hall debut in 'Kander and Ebb – The Night of 1000 Voices', a concert produced by Hugh Wooldridge, conducted by David Firman, with John Kander present. The number was reprised in Williams' arrangement for her shows at the Garrick Theatre 2010 season of The Showgirl Within, and for the opening in 2012 of Hamer Hall, Melbourne.

In 2010, the karaoke label Musical Creations released a six track album titled How Lucky Can You Get – In the Style of Barbra Streisand, which featured six different instrumental edits of "How Lucky Can You Get". During Streisand's concert tour titled Barbra: The Music, The Mem'ries, The Magic, she sang a live rendition of "How Lucky Can You Get" at her shows; she also featured this on her accompanying ninth live album, The Music...The Mem'ries...The Magic! (2017).

== Chart performance ==
"How Lucky Can You Get" did not enter the main charts in the United States and Canada, but rather the Adult Contemporary charts in both countries. In the United States, the single debuted on the aforementioned chart at number 33 for the week ending May 31, 1975. After rising for several weeks, it peaked at number 27 on June 21. In Canada, it debuted at number 35 and was the week's highest debut according to the official list compiled by RPM. It eventually reached number 19 in its fourth week charting (and was also its peak position).

== Track listings ==
United States 7" single

- A1 "How Lucky Can You Get" – 3:53
- B1 "More Than You Know" – 2:25

Italy 7" single

- A1 "How Lucky Can You Get (Long Version)" – 4:48
- B1 "More Than You Know" – 2:26

== Charts ==
Chart performance for "How Lucky Can You Get"
Chart (1975)	Peak position
Canada Adult Contemporary (RPM)	19
US Adult Contemporary (Billboard)	27
