= Here Again (disambiguation) =

Here Again is an album by American singer Johnny Nash.

Here Again may also refer to:

- Here Again (A Will Away album)
- "Here Again" (song), a song by Elevation Worship
