= Fabulous Five Inc. =

Jamaican reggae band

- Also known as: Fabulous Five, Fab Five Inc., Fabulous 5 Inc., Fab Five, Fab 5
- Genres: Reggae, roots reggae, soca
- Years active: 1970–present
- Labels: Trojan, Jaywax
- Members: Grub Cooper (director); Harold Bailey; Frankie Campbell; Andrew Cassanova; Romeo Gray; Donovan Lee Palmer; Andre Palmer; Cleveland Manderson
- Past members: Steve Golding; Sidney Thorpe
- Website: www.fab5inc.com

The Fabulous Five Inc. (also known as Fab 5) is a reggae and soca band formed in Jamaica in the late 1960s. Over a 45-year career, they have released 26 albums, had many number 1 hits in Jamaica, and were the featured musicians on Johnny Nash's platinum album I Can See Clearly Now.

They were voted the top band for three consecutive years by Swing magazine, have won over 30 major awards in Jamaica in addition to international awards, and performed at numerous international music festivals.

== History ==
The Fabulous Five Inc. was initially a show band supporting various singers across Jamaica. They backed Johnny Nash on the reggae cuts comprising most of his 1972 platinum album I Can See Clearly Now. Their first recording was "Come Back And Stay", which was a number one song in Jamaica. During their first three years on the road, they won the Swing Awards for best band.

Fab 5 have enjoyed a succession of hits in Jamaica and the markets of North America. Their multi‑award-winning soca album Yu Safe was the most-popular album produced in Jamaica in the 1980s. Their soca smash "Shape" is very popular and the band's versatility is expressed in Dugu-Dugu, their all-reggae release, and the preceding all-ska album Ska Time. The musician and journalist Sonny Bradshaw said Fab 5 is the only Jamaican band still playing authentic ska.

They have developed songs not only with the music of Jamaica, but with their own compositions of soca, the music of the Eastern Caribbean. They have performed soul, funk, rock, jazz, disco, gospel, and classical music. Their album Christmas In the Sun is the most-successful Christmas album by a Jamaican band.

The Fab 5 have their own recording studio (Stage Studio), record label and distribution company (Stage Records). They are still working frequently, for concerts and dances, and as a leading creator of commercial jingles. They have been the chosen band for almost every national occasion since the mid-1970s. In 2003, Fab 5 received the Prime Minister's Award for Excellence in the Performing Arts for its services to Jamaican music. In 2015, they were given an award for their contribution to Jamaican music by the Jamaica Cultural Development Commission (JCDC).

Fab 5 took their brand of Jamaican music around the world, working with artists including: Ray Charles; Dizzy Gillespie; the Grateful Dead; Rick James; Linda Ronstadt; the Neville Brothers; Roberta Flack; Fats Domino; Peter, Paul & Mary; Joe Jackson; The Chi‑Lites; Skeeter Davis (with whom they were working on a recording project at the time of her death); the Drifters; Miriam Makeba; Bob Marley; Jimmy Cliff; Chuck Jackson; The Mighty Sparrow; Aretha Franklin; Gladys Knight; Harold Melvin & The Bluenotes; Jerry Butler; The Manhattans; Ray Goodman & Brown; The Delphonics, Beres Hammond, Marcia Griffiths, Queen Ifrica, Mr Vegas, and Tarrus Riley. They have performed at the Kool Jazz Festival, the New Orleans Jazz Festival, at Japansplash, and have entertained a live audience of one million at an anti‑nuclear concert in New York's Central Park. In July 2011, their performance at the Celebrate Brooklyn! festival drew a 5-minute ovation and their performances at the Irie Fest in Toronto during Caribana have become legendary.

Their collection of major awards includes 29 between 1986 and 1996, from all principal sources: the JBC, RJR, The Daily Gleaner, The Star, Rockers, the Jamaica Music Industry (JAMI), the Jamaica Federation of Musicians (JFM), the 1995 Rockers Award for Best Band, the 1996 award for Best Group (Instrumental) at the Jamaica Music Awards, a 1999 Tamika Award, the 2000–2002 JFM Best Show Band Awards, The Reggae Soca Awards Best Soca Band 2002–2003, a 2007 Lifetime Achievement Award from Reggae Sumfest, and a 2012 JaRIA Honours Award.

The group has won several international awards, including the 1996 awards for Best Album and Best Single (both won for Good Buddy), at the Miami Reggae/Soca Awards, and the 1999 "Best International Reggae Album" award at the Canadian Reggae Music Awards for Fab 5 Live - The Ultimate Vintage Jamaican Party Mix ... Part 1. Fab 5 won the "Best Soca Album" award at the Reggaesoca Awards in Miami for their 1999 album Shape, making them the first group to win best album awards for reggae and soca in the same year. The band's musical director Grub Cooper's CD has won numerous awards, including the Order of Distinction, Commander Class (CD) 2006 (a national award of the Government of Jamaica), and a special honor award from the JFM (1988) for his contribution to the development of Jamaican music. He has been Jamaica's leading theater musician for more than three decades and a major producer of gospel music. Frankie Campbell also received the OD.

Fab 5 have been actively involved in keeping Jamaican music alive, with major representation on the boards of JARIA (Jamaica Reggae Industry Association), the Recording Industry Association of Jamaica (RIAJAM), and the Jamaican Association of Vintage Artistes and Affiliates (JAVAA). The band works with many charitable organizations.

== Members ==
The band consisted of manager Frankie Campbell (bass); Harold (Jr) Bailey (guitar, flute, saxophone, and now part-time sound engineer); musical director Grub Cooper (drums and lead vocals); Sidney Thorpe (keyboards); Donovan Lee Palmer (keyboards); Romeo Gray (trombone); Andre Palmer (trumpet); Andrew Cassanova (vocals); and Cleveland Manderson (guitar and vocals) who has been working with the Unique Vision for more than 27 years. Other people perform from time to time as part of the wider Stage Records family.

Keyboardist Sidney Thorpe died from sepsis on 5 May 2025.

== Selected discography ==
=== Albums ===
1. Fabulous Five Inc. (1973), New Dimension
2. F F One (1975), Tit for Tat
3. My Jamaican Girl (1976), Harry J
4. Miles and Miles of Music (1985), Stage Records
5. Yu Safe (1986)
6. Jamaican Woman (1987)
7. Stage Records Greatest Hits (1988), Various Artistes – Stage Records
8. All Night Party (1989), Stage Records
9. Mini (1990), Stage Records
10. Christmas In The Sun (1990), Stage Crew (Various Artistes), Stage Records
11. Don't Wear None (1993), Stage Records
12. Good Buddy (1995), Stage Records
13. Fab 5 Live – The Ultimate Vintage Jamaican Party Mix, Part 1 (1998), Stage Records
14. Shape (1999), Stage Records
15. Dugu-Dugu (2000), Stage Records
16. Fab 5 Live – The Ultimate Vintage Jamaican Party Mix, Part 2 (2002), Stage Records
17. Jamaica Soca Attack (2002), Various Artistes – Stage Records
18. Back To Back (CD compilation of Yu Safe and All Night Party) (2002), Stage Records
19. Fab 5 Greatest Hits (2002), Stage Records
20. Ska Time (2002) Stage Records
21. A Jamaican Christmas Gift (2002), Stage Records
22. Fab 5 Live – The Ultimate Vintage Jamaican Party Mix, Part 3 (2004), Stage Records
23. Fab 5 Live – The Ultimate Vintage Jamaican Party Mix, Part 4 (2007), Stage Records
24. Fab 5 Live – The Ultimate Vintage Jamaican Party Mix, BOX SET (Parts 1–4) (2007), Stage Records
25. Fab 5 & Friends Live: 1962–2012... 50 Years of Jamaican Music (2011), Stage Records
26. Face to Face (Fab 5 collaborations) (2015) Stage Records

=== Singles ===
- "Come Back and Stay"
- "Chirpy Chirpy Cheep" (cover)
- "Oh Dad"
- "Shaving Cream" (cover)
- "Married Lady"
- "Love Me for a Reason" (cover)
- "If I Could Read Your Mind"
- "All I Want"
- "Sweet P"
- "Disco Pot"
- "Asking For Love"
- "Oo? Wa?"
- "Yu Safe"
- "Ring Road Jam"
- "Feeling Horny"
- "What The Police High Command Can Do"
- "All Night Party"
- "Jamaican Woman"
- "Psalms"
- "We Want Peace"
- "Mini"
- "Sweat"
- "Don't Wear None"
- "Freeze"
- "Soca Train"
- "Good Buddy"
- "Mango"
- "Glory Hallelujah"

== Awards ==
Jamaica

- Swing Awards, best band of 1971–72, 1972–73 and 1973–74
- El Suzie Award, Joint Top Road and Dance Band for 1975–76
- RJR Listeners' Award, Best Band, 1980
- Rockers Award for Best Band, 1995
- Jamaica Music Awards, Best Group (Instrumental), 1996
- Tamika Award, 1999
- JFM Best Show Band Awards, 2000–2002
- Prime Minister's Award for Excellence in The Performing Arts, 2003
- Reggae Sumfest Lifetime Achievement Award, 2007
- Jamaica Reggae Industry Association Honours Award, 2012
- Jamaica Cultural Development Commission award for contribution to Jamaican music, 2015

Among dozens of other national awards. Grub Cooper and Frankie Campbell have each been awarded the Order of Distinction (OD) from the government of Jamaica for their contribution to the development of Jamaican music.

International

- Miami Reggae/Soca Awards:
  - Best Album, Good Buddy, 1996
  - Best Single, "Good Buddy", 1996
  - Best Soca Album, Shape, 1999
- Canadian Reggae Music Awards:
  - Best International Reggae Album, The Ultimate Vintage Jamaican Party Mix Part 1, 1999
