= My Father's Song =

- Spanish picture sleeve

Single by Barbra Streisand

from the album Lazy Afternoon
- B-side: "By the Way"; "Da Paso"
- Released: August 1975
- Recorded: April 11, 1975
- Studio: Capitol Studios (Los Angeles, CA)
- Length: 3:33
- Label: Columbia
- Songwriter: Rupert Holmes
- Producers: Jeffrey Lesser; Rupert Holmes

Barbra Streisand singles chronology
"How Lucky Can You Get" (1975)	"My Father's Song" (1975)	"Shake Me, Wake Me (When It's Over)" (1975)

"My Father's Song" is a song recorded by American singer Barbra Streisand for her seventeenth studio album, Lazy Afternoon (1975). It was released as a 7" single in August 1975 through Columbia Records. Rupert Holmes wrote the song in collaboration with its producer Jeffrey Lesser. A sentimental ballad, "My Father's Song" was about Streisand's childhood with her father; Holmes' lyrics involve a protagonist, presumably a daughter, asking for her father's approval in life and love.

Streisand released "My Father's Song" and its B-side track "By the Way" in Spain retitled "La Canción de Mi Padre" and "Da Paso", respectively. Simon Price, a writer for The Quietus, liked "My Father's Song" and the other Holmes-written tracks on Lazy Afternoon because he felt they demonstrated Streisand's strengths and abilities on the album. Commercially, it entered the Adult Contemporary charts in both the United States and Canada, peaking at numbers 11 and 15, respectively.

== Background and composition ==
"My Father's Song" was a brand new song recorded specifically for Streisand's seventeenth studio album, Lazy Afternoon (1975). Produced by Jeffrey Lesser and Rupert HolmesStreisand worked closely with Holmes during the creation of the album. Prior to their collaboration, Holmes was considered to be relatively unknown. After finishing up with Holmes and in order to thank him for the collaborations, Streisand hand-wrote him a note that read, "Dear Rupert, don't be frightened, you're the best, love Barbra". In the official liner notes of L. azy Afternoon, she stated that the track was "a very personal gift [that] mean[t] a great to deal to me"; responding to her comments in a 1988 interview with a Streisand fan, Holmes claimed that the process was simple and that he had only "put in [...] everything that a daughter might want to hear her father say" in the lyrics.

The track was released as the album's lead single in August 1975 through Columbia Records. On the standard edition 7" release, "My Father's Song" was accompanied by the B-side track "By the Way", which was written by both Holmes and Streisand specifically for Lazy Afternoon and would later be included on it. A promotional 7" vinyl record was also released and included both the mono and stereo versions of the song. For a special edition version in Spain, Streisand and Holmes created a Spanish version of both songs on the original 7" single for a commercial release in that country; released on October 3, 1975, "My Father's Song" was retitled "La Canción de Mi Padre" and "By the Way" was called "Da Paso".

"My Father's Song", like the majority of the tracks on Lazy Afternoon, is a "sympathetic" ballad that focuses heavily on Streisand's vocals. According to the official sheet music published by the Warner Music Group, the song is written in the key of D major with a moderately slow beat consisting of 125 beats per minute. In the lyrics of "My Father's Song", Streisand sings about discussions with her father where he claims, "Whatever you are, you're going to be / Whatever you are is all right with me".

== Reception ==
Simon Price of London's The Quietus spoke highly of "My Father's Song" and the two others Rupert-written tracks on Lazy Afternoon ( "Letters That Cross in the Mail", and "Widescreen"). His favoritism stemmed from the "collaborative spirit that you can hear between her and Rupie"; he also stated that working with Streisand changed Rupert's life and displayed that Streisand was "in her prime".

"My Father's Song" did not enter the main charts in the United States and Canada, but rather the Adult Contemporary charts in both countries. In the United States, the single debuted on the aforementioned chart at number 40 for the week ending September 6, 1975, and was the week's second highest debut according to Billboard. After rising for several weeks, it peaked at number 11 on October 25. In Canada, it debuted at number 48 according to the official list compiled by RPM. It eventually reached number 15 in its fifth week charting (and was also its peak position).

== Track listings and formats ==
Standard edition 7" single

- A1 "My Father's Song" – 3:33
- B1 "By the Way" – 2:56

Spain 7" single

- A1 "La Canción de Mi Padre" – 3:34
- B1 "Da Paso" – 2:54

Promotional 7" single

- A1 "My Father's Song (Mono Version)" – 3:33
- B1 "My Father's Song (Stereo Version)" – 3:33

== Charts ==
Chart performance for "My Father's Song"
Chart (1975)	Peak position
Canada Adult Contemporary (RPM)	15
US Adult Contemporary (Billboard)	11
