= Jubilation (song) =

1972 single by Paul Anka

- Promotional United States release

Single by Paul Anka

from the album Jubilation
- B-side: "Everything's Been Changed"
- Released: 1972
- Recorded: 1972
- Studio: Bell Sound (New York City)
- Genre: Gospel
- Length: 6:29
- Label: Buddah
- Songwriters: Paul Anka; Johnny Harris
- Producer: Johnny Harris

Paul Anka singles chronology
| "Do I Love You" (1971) | "Jubilation" (1972) | "Life Song" (1972) |

"Jubilation" is a song recorded by Canadian singer-songwriter Paul Anka for his 1972 studio album of the same name. Anka wrote the song with Johnny Harris, who also produced the track. It was released in 1972 as a 7" single by Buddah Records. A gospel song, the lyrics of "Jubilation" find the protagonist preaching about religious themes. Making a moderate commercial impact, it appeared on the record charts in both Canada and the United States. It has since been included on several of Anka's greatest hits albums and covered by The Edwin Hawkins Singers in 1973.

American vocalist Barbra Streisand covered "Jubilation" in 1974 for her sixteenth studio album, ButterFly. It was also released as a single but was substantially shorter than Anka's original version. Commenting on her cover, Anka praised Barbra's vocal capabilities and joked that she "can sing the phone book" if she wanted to.

== Background and composition ==
"Jubilation" was included on Anka's 1972 studio album (also titled Jubilation) and released by Buddah Records in May. It was one of the two songs written by Anka on the album, with the other being "She's a Lady". "Jubilation" was first sent to United States Top 40 radio stations in 1972 as an airplay single, accompanied by the release of two different 7" singles. In a September 1972 Billboard article describing how American music would often find more success in Canada, the author claimed that despite Anka having Canadian citizenship, "Jubilation" was listed as "domestic content" on Canadian radio stations.

The song was also physically released as a single in the United States and Canada. The promotional version, released in both countries, includes an extended and a shortened version of "Jubilation". The main United States edition features B-side track "Everything's Been Changed", another song written by Anka. "Jubilation", along with other tracks on the album, is primarily a gospel song. The track was written by Anka and Johnny Harris, with the latter musician solely producing it. It was mastered by Robin C. Kruse and recorded at Bell Sound Studios in New York City during 1972. In the lyrics, the protagonist preaches and discusses religious themes: "Sinners take heed / For the life that you lead is deceiving / Nothing replaces a man / That embraces believing, no".

== Reception ==
On Canada's official singles chart, compiled by RPM, "Jubilation" debuted at number 86 for the week ending March 18, 1972. Two months later on May 13, the single peaked at number 31. On the "Hits of the World" rankings created by Billboard, the single was listed as the sixth most popular song in Canada on June 3, 1972. In the United States, it entered the Billboard Hot 100 at the lowest position (number 100) on March 25, 1972. Later in May of that same year, it peaked at number 65; "Jubilation" charted in the United States on the Hot 100 for a total of nine consecutive weeks. Reflecting on the commercial success of the song, Don Cusic, author of The Sound of Light: A History of Gospel and Christian Music, claimed that Anka's version of "Jubilation" was one of the few "gospel-related songs" to enter a musical record chart in 1972.

== In other media ==
American group The Edwin Hawkins Singers released "Jubilation" as a single in multiple territories in September 1973. All of the versions appear with either B-side tracks "Do My Thing" (written by Hawkins) or an "mono" version of "Jubilation". It would later be featured on their 1973 studio album New World where it was the album's lead single and opening track.

"Jubilation" is also featured on a few compilation albums released by Anka. It was first included on She's a Lady, a collection of Anka's commercial singles, which was released in 1975. It was also included on his first two greatest hits albums, being The Best of Paul Anka (1985) and 30th Anniversary Collection (1989). It has since been featured on Vegas Style (2000), Golden Hour of Paul Anka (2001), Live and In Concert (2003), and Rock Swings: Live at the Montreal Jazz Festival (2005).

== Track listings ==
Canada and United States promotional 7" single

- A1 "Jubilation (Long Version)" – 6:29
- B1 "Jubilation (Short Version)" – 4:04

United States 7" single

- A1 "Jubilation" – 6:29
- B1 "Everything's Been Changed" – 3:50

== Charts ==
Chart performance for "Jubilation"
| Chart (1972) | Peak position |
|---|---|
| Canada Top Singles (RPM) | 31 |
| US Billboard Hot 100 | 65 |

== Barbra Streisand version ==
"Jubilation"
- Germany release vinyl sleeve

Single by Barbra Streisand

from the album ButterFly
- B-side: "Let the Good Times Roll"; "Crying Time"
- Released: April 1975
- Recorded: July 1974
- Studio: A&M Studios, Hollywood, California
- Length: 3:52
- Label: Columbia
- Songwriters: Paul Anka; Johnny Harris
- Producer: Jon Peters

Barbra Streisand singles chronology
| "Guava Jelly" (1974) | "Jubilation" (1975) | "How Lucky Can You Get" (1975) |

=== Background and recording ===
American vocalist Barbra Streisand recorded her own version of "Jubilation" for her sixteenth studio album, ButterFly (1974). Despite Anka's original version totaling six minutes and 29 seconds, Streisand's is considerably shorter at three minutes and 52 seconds. On Anka's self-written book My Way: An Autobiography, he wrote that he was surprised to learn that Streisand's then-boyfriend Jon Peters was the one who produced the track: "Peters was still her hairdresser. Next thing you know he's her producer, and he's produced mega motion pictures". However, he also acknowledged Streisand's rendition: "Barbra can sing the phone book. She has no problem singing anything. She's got one of the great voices". For an album review on Billboard's "Top Album Picks" column in their weekly magazine, a critic listed Streisand's version of "Jubilation" as one of the "best cuts" on ButterFly.

"Jubilation", along with several other tracks from ButterFly, was recorded by Streisand at A&M Studios in Los Angeles during July 1974. Produced by Peters, it was arranged by Tom Scott and John Bahler, while Hank Cicalo served as an engineer. Columbia Records released it as the second and final single from ButterFly in April 1975. It was distributed in the United States, Canada, and Germany. The US and Canadian version features B-side track "Let the Good Times Roll", while the German release includes a cover of Buck Owens's "Crying Time", A promotional release was also distributed in the United States and includes the mono and stereo versions of "Jubilation".

=== Track listings ===
United States and Canada 7" single

- A1 "Jubilation" – 2:52
- B1 "Let the Good Times Roll" – 4:57

United States promotional 7" single

- A1 "Jubilation" (Stereo) – 2:52
- B1 "Jubilation" (Mono) – 2:52

Germany 7" single

- A1 "Jubilation" – 2:52
- B1 "Crying Time" – 2:51
