= I Can See Clearly Now =

1972 reggae/soul song by Johnny Nash

Single by Johnny Nash

from the album I Can See Clearly Now
- B-side: "How Good It Is"
- Released: June 23, 1972
- Genre: Reggae; soul; R&B
- Length: 2:45
- Label: Epic
- Songwriter: Johnny Nash
- Producer: Johnny Nash

Johnny Nash singles chronology
"Stir It Up" (1972)	"I Can See Clearly Now" (1972)	"There Are More Questions Than Answers" (1972)

Official audio
- "I Can See Clearly Now" on YouTube

"I Can See Clearly Now" is a song written and recorded by American singer-songwriter Johnny Nash. It was the lead single from his twelfth album, I Can See Clearly Now (1972) and achieved success in the United States and the United Kingdom when it was released in 1972, reaching No. 1 on the US Billboard Hot 100 and Cash Box charts. It also reached No. 1 in Canada and South Africa. The song has been covered by many artists throughout the years, including a version by Jimmy Cliff for the motion picture soundtrack of Cool Runnings that peaked at No. 18 on the US Billboard Hot 100 in 1993.

== Writing and recording ==
After Nash wrote and composed the original version, he recorded it in London with members of the Fabulous Five Inc., and produced it himself. The song's arrangements and style are both heavily laced with reggae influences, as Nash had earlier collaborated with Bob Marley and his approach drew strongly from Marley's reggae style. The instrumental break was played by Francis Monkman on a Moog synthesizer.

== Chart performance ==
"I Can See Clearly Now" peaked at No. 1 on the US Billboard Hot 100 on November 4, 1972, remaining atop this chart for four weeks, and also spent the same four weeks atop the adult contemporary chart.

== Charts ==
=== Weekly charts ===
Chart (1972–1973)	Peak position
Australia (Kent Music Report)	3
Austria (Hitradio Ö3)	9
Canada Top Singles (RPM)	1
Canada Adult Contemporary (RPM)	6
Ireland (Irish Singles Chart)	9
Israel (IBA)	23
New Zealand (Listener)	5
South Africa (Springbok)	1
UK Singles (OCC)	5
US Billboard Hot 100	1
US Bestselling Soul Singles (Billboard)	38
US Hot Adult Contemporary Tracks (Billboard)	1

Chart (1989)	Peak position
UK Singles (OCC)	54

=== Year-end charts ===
Chart (1972)	Rank
Australia (Kent Music Report)	46
Canada Top Singles (RPM)	35
US Billboard Hot 100	47

== Certifications ==
Region	Certification	Certified units/sales
Italy (FIMI)	Gold	50,000^{‡}
United Kingdom (BPI)	Gold	400,000^{‡}
United States (RIAA)	Gold	1,000,000^{^}
^{^} Shipments figures based on certification alone.^{‡} Sales+streaming figures based on certification alone.

== Jimmy Cliff version ==
"I Can See Clearly Now"

Single by Jimmy Cliff

from the album Cool Runnings: Music from the Motion Picture
- B-side: "Sweet Jamaica" by Tony Rebel
- Released: 29 October 1993
- Genre: Pop-reggae
- Length: 3:16
- Label: Chaos; Columbia
- Songwriter: Johnny Nash
- Producer: Paul Henton

Jimmy Cliff singles chronology
"Samba Reggae" (1993)	"I Can See Clearly Now" (1993)	"(Your Love Keeps Lifting Me) Higher and Higher" (1994)

Music video
- "I Can See Clearly Now" on YouTube

Jamaican reggae singer Jimmy Cliff recorded a cover of the song for the 1993 movie Cool Runnings. It was released as a single in October 1993 by Chaos Records, reaching No. 18 on the US Billboard Hot 100. Internationally, the song reached No. 1 in France, Iceland and New Zealand. In 2005, after the song was used as the opening theme for the Japanese television drama series Engine, it was released in Japan and peaked at No. 45 on the Oricon chart. The music video for this version was directed by film director Scott Hamilton Kennedy.

=== Critical reception ===
Larry Flick from Billboard magazine wrote, "Cliff manages to breathe freshness into this oft-covered pop nugget. His laid-back vocal is matched by a relatively faithful arrangement (except for the delicate reggae flavors). Already amassing praise at adult formats, track is a good bet for eventual top 40 success."

=== Charts ===
==== Weekly charts ====
Chart (1993–1994)	Peak position
Australia (ARIA)	17
Belgium (Ultratop 50 Flanders)	32
Canada Top Singles (RPM)	16
Canada Adult Contemporary (RPM)	26
Canada Dance/Urban (RPM)	9
Europe (Eurochart Hot 100)	18
Europe (European AC Radio)	11
Europe (European Dance Radio)	18
Europe (European Hit Radio)	15
France (SNEP)	1
Germany (GfK)	52
Iceland (Íslenski Listinn Topp 40)	1
Netherlands (Single Top 100)	39
New Zealand (Recorded Music NZ)	1
Scottish Singles Sales (Official Charts)	26
UK Singles (Official Charts)	23
UK Airplay (Music Week)	6
US Billboard Hot 100	18
US Adult Contemporary (Billboard)	9
US Hot R&B/Hip-Hop Songs (Billboard)	98
US Pop Airplay (Billboard)	7
US Cash Box Top 100	14

Chart (2005)	Peak position
Japan (Oricon)	45

==== Year-end charts ====
Chart (1994)	Position
Australia (ARIA)	72
Europe (Eurochart Hot 100)	81
France (SNEP)	11
Iceland (Íslenski Listinn Topp 40)	7
New Zealand (RIANZ)	14
UK Singles (OCC)	196
US Billboard Hot 100	66
US Adult Contemporary (Billboard)	22

=== Sales and certifications ===
Region	Certification	Certified units/sales
France (SNEP)	Gold	250,000^{*}
New Zealand (RMNZ)	Platinum	10,000^{*}
United Kingdom (BPI)	Silver	200,000^{‡}
^{*} Sales figures based on certification alone.

=== Release history ===
Region	Date	Format(s)	Label(s)	Ref.
United States	October 1993	Top 40; adult contemporary radio	Chaos; Columbia	
Australia	January 10, 1994	CD; cassette	Columbia	
Japan	June 1, 2005	CD	Sony Int'l	

== Other notable covers ==
- Ray Charles covered this song in his 1977 album True to Life.
- Irish band Hothouse Flowers released their version as the second single from their album Home in 1990. It reached No. 5 in Ireland, No. 22 in Australia and No. 23 in the UK. Much later, in 2016, it featured on the first episode of the Amazon Prime Video series, The Grand Tour, where the band themselves made an appearance on stage.
- Buffalo Rose and R&B singer INEZ released their cover version as a single in 2021, later named one of the best songs of the year by WYEP-FM.
- The French singer Claude François also recorded a version of this song called "Toi et le soleil" that reached No. 15 in Belgium.
