= Lazy Afternoon (Barbra Streisand album) =

Studio album by Barbra Streisand
- Released: October 14, 1975
- Recorded: April 1975
- Studios: Record Plant (Los Angeles); RCA Victor (Hollywood); Capitol (Hollywood)
- Genre: Pop
- Length: 36:03
- Label: Columbia
- Producers: Rupert Holmes; Jeffrey Lesser

Barbra Streisand chronology
Funny Lady (1975)	Lazy Afternoon (1975)	Classical Barbra (1976)

Singles from Lazy Afternoon
- 1. "My Father's Song" Released: August 1975; 2. "Shake Me, Wake Me (When It's Over)" Released: November 12, 1975

Lazy Afternoon is the seventeenth studio album recorded by American singer Barbra Streisand. It was released on October 14, 1975, by Columbia Records. Following a mixed critical response to her previous studio album, ButterFly (1974), the singer began working with new musicians for the project. The album was recorded in April 1975 in Los Angeles. Producer Rupert Holmes wrote three songs on the album and co-wrote a fourth, "By the Way", with Streisand. She also included a few cover songs, such as the Four Tops' "Shake Me, Wake Me (When It's Over)", Stevie Wonder's "You and I", and Libby Holman's "Moanin' Low".

The album received generally favorable reviews from music critics who agreed that it was more exciting than ButterFly. Commercially, the album peaked at number 12 in the United States, number 42 in Canada, and number 84 in Australia. It was later certified gold by the RIAA for shipments of 500,000 copies. "My Father's Song" and "Shake Me, Wake Me (When It's Over)" were released as singles in August and November 1975, respectively. The former entered the Adult Contemporary charts in the United States and Canada while the latter was a success on two of Billboard's dance charts in late 1975.

== Development ==
Following the release of the Funny Lady soundtrack earlier in 1975, Streisand began work on Lazy Afternoon with producers Jeffrey Lesser and Rupert Holmes, with whom she had not previously worked. Because of the lackluster critical response to her previous album, ButterFly (1974), and her personal dislike for the record, she chose to collaborate with new musicians for the then-upcoming album. Holmes, in particular, was nervous while working with the singer. Following the completion of the album, Streisand hand-wrote a note to Holmes that read, "Dear Rupert, don't be frightened, you're the best, love Barbra". Specifically, she was touched by "My Father's Song", writing in the liner notes that she considered the song to be "a very personal gift [that] means a great to deal to me".

Recording sessions for the album took place at Record Plant, RCA Studios, and Capitol Recording Studios in Los Angeles in April 1975. Columbia Records released Lazy Afternoon on October 14, 1975. It features handwritten liner notes developed by Streisand herself; she opened the booklet by writing, "While I usually let the vinyl speak for itself, I really had fun making this record, and I thought it might interest you to know something about each song. After all, I wouldn't want to be a chef who doesn't share her secrets!" Additionally, the label issued the album as an 8-track cartridge in 1975, with the track listing switching the order of "By the Way" and "Widescreen" around. Also a Cassette Tape version was issued. The album was finally released in compact disc format on October 25, 1990.

== Music and lyrics ==
As a whole, the album contains a mixture of several different genres of music, particularly pop standards. Commenting on the diverse musical nature of the album, author Tom Santopietro described as the singer being able to "cover [...] all fan bases without seriously alienating any". Lazy Afternoon opens with the title track, written by John La Touche and Jerome Moross. A "poetic nature song" where "Streisand gives her voice totally over to the lyrics", director Francis Ford Coppola suggested the song to the singer in order to revive it. "My Father's Song" was written by Holmes and is the first original song on the track listing. Like other album tracks, it was considered to be a "sympathetic" ballad that relies on Streisand's vocals, according to AllMusic's William Ruhlmann. "By the Way", the record's third track, is noted as Streisand's first English-lyric songwriting credit in her career. While creating the track, Streisand decided to write from a "sense of resolute rather than desperate emotions". It is followed by a cover of the Four Tops' "Shake Me, Wake Me (When It's Over)". The original version, set in a gospel rock tempo, was updated into a disco track. The song tells a story of a lost love, with neighbors supposedly discussing the matter during "long and sleepless night[s]". "I Never Had It So Good" is the fifth track on Lazy Afternoon and was written by Paul Williams and Roger Nichols. She wrote in the album's liner notes that she had always wanted to sing it and accompany it with someone playing the harmonica.

"Letters That Cross in the Mail" was the first song recorded for the album. Streisand claimed that the inspiration behind the track was "about love and the postal service". Santopietro wrote that Holmes' love of "big band sound[s]" and "a full symphonic orchestra" is evident in the production. Following her cover of "All in Love Is Fair" in 1974, seventh track "You and I" is Streisand's second cover of a Stevie Wonder song. Taken from his 1972 studio album Talking Book, she called the pop song "immediately [...] touch[ing]" and considered Wonder "brilliant" for his work on it. Written by Howard Dietz and Ralph Rainger, Streisand's cover of Libby Holman's "Moanin' Low" appears as the eighth song. In order to place focus on the lyrics during the song, the production contains "octave leaps" while Streisand "changes timbre frequently and quickly between loud and soft sections and high and low pitches". Ninth track "A Child Is Born" features a simple piano arrangement accompanied by Streisand's vocals; Columbia Records' executive reacted to the track's new genre for the singer, stating, "You could put Barbra in front of a rock band or a symphony orchestra, she would still be Barbra Streisand, not compromising, not uncomfortable". "Widescreen", the album's closing track, was inspired by the singer's love of film; according to author Patrick E. Horrigan, it specifically explains "how the movies, dark and dreamlike, seduce us into believing that life can be fulfilling, then let us down as soon as we return to the light of day". It was also the last of four tracks written by Holmes and has a production consisting of "synthesized electronics".

== Singles ==
"My Father's Song" was released as the album's lead single in August 1975. The 7" record was released in the United States and Spain where the song was retitled "La Canción de Mi Padre". The song was paired with B-side "By the Way", although in Spain the track was titled "Da Paso". The single enjoyed success on the United States Adult Contemporary chart, where it peaked at number 11. It also entered the similar chart in Canada, where it reached number 15. Nicky Siano, a disc jockey, began playing Streisand's version of "Shake Me, Wake Me (When It's Over)" at The Gallery nightclub in New York City in the fall of 1975; in a handwritten letter by Streisand for Siano, she wrote that the hype generated from playing her cover at the club prompted Columbia Records to release it as another single from Lazy Afternoon. It was distributed in 7" and 12" vinyl formats on November 12, 1975 featuring the B-side and album track "Widescreen". A British version of the single was also created and features the longer cut of the single instead of the album version. Streisand's cover was noted by writers for Billboard as an attempt for pop singers to begin "releasing disco records"; other singers like Andy Williams and Ethel Merman were also mentioned as individuals following the fad. Due to heavy airplay in dance clubs, it entered two of the dance charts compiled by Billboard; it peaked at number 14 on the Dance Club Songs chart and number 10 on the Disco Singles chart.

== Critical reception ==
Professional ratings
Review scores
Source	Rating
AllMusic	3/5 stars

Lazy Afternoon received a positive response from music critics and her fans. Stephen Holden from Rolling Stone applauded Streisand, finding it to be a better album than 1974's ButterFly. He called "By the Way" as one of her most classic songs and found her vocals to be "controlled"; he also liked Holmes and Lesser's contributions as producers. Furthermore, Holden felt that as "the greatest singer of the past quarter-century, Streisand is one artist who not only withstands elaborate production but thrives on it". Derek Winnert, who wrote a biography of Streisand, found the album to be "outstanding" and considered "Shake Me, Wake Me (When It's Over)" and "By the Way" as the album's two best tracks. With a more mixed opinion, AllMusic's William Ruhlmann awarded the album three out of five stars. He liked Streisand's vocals and the "delicately played individual instruments" that focused on them. However, he concluded "for the most part, Lazy Afternoon was true to its title, a collection of relaxed performances that was pleasant without being particularly impressive". British singer Rumer stated in The Quietus that Lazy Afternoon is one of her favorite albums, in addition to calling it "cinematic", "dreamy", and a "gorgeous experience". She recommended it as "the album for people who don't like Barbra Streisand" as it would likely change their minds.

== Commercial performance ==
In the United States, Lazy Afternoon debuted at number 107 on the Billboard 200 chart for the week ending November 1, 1975. It continued rising on the charts for several weeks before peaking at number 12 on December 20 of that same year. Later in 1976 due to the album's strong sales, the Recording Industry Association of America (RIAA) certified Lazy Afternoon Gold on April 14, 1976 for shipments of 500,000 copies. In Canada, the album peaked at a much lower position; it debuted on RPM's official list at number 69 as the week's third highest entry on December 20, 1975. The following month and year, it would reach its peak position at number 42. It also charted in Australia, where it peaked at number 84 according to the Kent Music Report.

== Track listing ==
All tracks produced by Jeffrey Lesser and Rupert Holmes.

Lazy Afternoon – Standard edition
No.	Title	Writer(s)	Length
1.	"Lazy Afternoon"	John La Touche; Jerome Moross	3:47
2.	"My Father's Song"	Rupert Holmes	3:52
3.	"By the Way"	Barbra Streisand; Holmes	2:55
4.	"Shake Me, Wake Me (When It's Over)"	Brian Holland; Lamont Dozier; Eddie Holland	2:50
5.	"I Never Had It So Good"	Paul Williams; Roger Nichols	3:35
6.	"Letters That Cross in the Mail"	Holmes	3:36
7.	"You and I"	Stevie Wonder	4:16
8.	"Moanin' Low"	Howard Dietz; Ralph Rainger	4:25
9.	"A Child Is Born"	Alan Bergman; Marilyn Bergman; Dave Grusin	2:48
10.	"Widescreen"	Holmes	3:59
Total length:			36:03

Lazy Afternoon – 8-track cartridge edition
No.	Title	Length
1.	"Lazy Afternoon"	3:47
2.	"My Father's Song"	3:52
3.	"Widescreen"	3:59
4.	"Shake Me, Wake Me (When It's Over)"	2:53
5.	"I Never Had It So Good"	3:35
6.	"Letters That Cross in the Mail"	3:36
7.	"You and I"	4:16
8.	"Moanin' Low"	4:25
9.	"A Child Is Born"	2:48
10.	"By the Way"	2:55
Total length:		36:06

== Personnel ==
Credits adapted from the liner notes of the standard edition of Lazy Afternoon.

- Barbra Streisand – vocals
- Nancy Donald – album design
- Sam Emerson – black and white photography
- Rupert Holmes – producer, conductor, arranger
- Jeffrey Lesser – producer, engineer, mixer
- Steve Schapiro – photography
- Frank DeCaro – music contractor, album supervisor

== Charts ==
Chart performance for Lazy Afternoon
Chart (1975–1976)	Peak position
Australia Albums (Kent Music Report)	84
Canada Top Albums/CDs (RPM)	42
US Billboard 200	12

== Certifications ==
Region	Certification	Certified units/sales
United States (RIAA)	Gold	500,000^{^}
^{^} Shipments figures based on certification alone.
