= Moanin' Low =

1929 popular torch song

Moanin' Low is a popular torch song. The music was written by Ralph Rainger; the lyrics by Howard Dietz. The song was published in 1929 and was introduced that same year in the musical revue The Little Show by Libby Holman becoming a hit and Holman's signature song. A recording by The Charleston Chasers (vocal by Eva Taylor) was also popular in 1929.

Since its publication, the song has become a popular jazz standard.

== Selected recordings ==
- Eva Taylor - recorded on June 28, 1929 for Columbia Records along with the song Ain't Misbehavin' from Connie’s Hot Chocolates on the opposite side (catalog No. 1891).
- Annette Hanshaw - recorded on August 29, 1929 for OKeh Records (catalog No. 41292).
- Billie Holiday recorded her version of the song on March 31, 1937 with Teddy Wilson and His Orchestra for Brunswick Records (catalog No. 7877).
- Lena Horne - recorded on December 17, 1941 for Victor Records (catalog No. 27817A).
- Harry James recorded a version in 1951 (released in 1952) on Columbia 39678.
- Ella Fitzgerald - recorded on December 31, 1953 for Decca Records (catalog No. 29475).
- Dinah Shore - included in the album Bouquet of Blues (1956).
- Johnny Mathis - for his album The Rhythms and Ballads of Broadway (1960)
- Barbra Streisand recorded her version of the song in 1975 in her album Lazy Afternoon, arranged and conducted by Rupert Holmes.

== Film appearances ==
- In the Humphrey Bogart-Lauren Bacall film, Key Largo, Claire Trevor gave a memorable rendition of the song in a role that won her the 1948 Academy Award for Best Supporting Actress.
- Annette Hanshaw's 1929 version was used in the animated film Sita Sings the Blues.
- In the 1950 Kirk Douglas-Lauren Bacall film, Young Man With A Horn, it appears repeatedly in instrumental form.

== See also ==
- List of 1920s jazz standards
