= Grooving Kingston 12 =

Compilation album by The Wailers
- Released: 2004
- Recorded: 1967–1972
- Genre: Reggae
- Label: Universal Records; JAD Records
- Producer: Bob Marley & The Wailers; Leslie Kong; Bunny Lee; Lee Perry

Grooving Kingston 12 is a 3 disc box set of Bob Marley and the Wailers material from the 1967–1972 period released in 2004 by Universal and JAD Records. An update of the Complete Wailers series along with Fy-Ah Fy-Ah and "Man To Man", it contains remastered versions of almost everything released during that period. These compilations were released to put an end to bootlegging and provide royalties to surviving artists and their families, and also to provide the complete discography without buying several separate CDs.

Kingston 12 in the title is in reference to the numbered postal zones established by the national post office of Jamaica. Trench Town, the home of Bob Marley and The Wailers' musical roots, is serviced under the aforementioned postal zone name. "Grooving Kingston 12" is a lyric from the song "Trench Town Rock."

== Reception ==
According to Jack Frost, writing for BBC Music, "Grooving Kingston 12 is an essential purchase for anyone wanting to understand the roots of reggae." Raoul Hernandez of the Austin Chronicle gave the album three out of five stars and writes that "Grooving Kingston 12 is mostly recanned material, but the selection and sequencing was canny." AllMusic gives the compilation 4 out of 5 stars.

== Track list ==
=== Disc 1 ===
1. Concrete Jungle 1971 (3:09)
2. Screw Face 1971 (2:21)
3. Lively Up Yourself 1971 (2:56)
4. Redder Than Red 1971 (3:10)
5. Craven Choke Puppy 1971 (2:52)
6. Do Good (Craven Version) (Craven Choke Puppy (DJ version)) 1973 (Note: Previously unreleased) (2:47)
7. Trench Town Rock 1971 (3:29)
8. Kingston 12 Shuffle (Trench Town Rock (DJ version)) 1971 (2:47)
9. Lick Samba 1971 (2:34)
10. Guava Jelly 1971 (2:16)
11. Satisfy My Soul Jah Jah 1971 (2:30)
12. Run For Cover 1970 (3:12)
13. Pour Down The Sunshine 1971 (2:19)
14. Send Me That Love 1971 (3:21)
15. Love Light 1971 (3:01)
16. Ammunition (Concrete Jungle (version)) 1971 (3:06)
17. Face Man (Screw Face (version2)) 1971 (2:56)
18. Live (Lively Up Yourself (version)) 1971 (2:53)
19. Red (Redder Than Red (version 1)) 1971 (2:47)
20. Choke (Craven Choke Puppy (version)) 1971 (2:36)
21. Grooving Kingston 12 (Trench Town Rock (version)) 1971 (2:57)
22. Samba (Lick Samba (version)) 1971 (2:34)
23. Jelly (Guava Jelly (version)) 1971 (2:14)
24. Satisfy Version (Satisfy My Soul Jah Jah (version)) 1971 (2:35)

=== Disc 2 ===
1. Kaya 1971 (2:38)
2. African Herbsman 1971 (2:19)
3. Mr Brown 1970 (3:33)
4. My Cup 1970 (3:33)
5. Downpresser 1971 (3:12)
6. Small Axe 1971 (4:00)
7. Dreamland 1970 (2:43)
8. Fussing And Fighting 1971 (2:27)
9. Keep On Moving 1971 (3:04)
10. Second Hand 1971 (3:56)
11. All In One 1971 (3:38)
12. Black Progress (version) 1970 (2:37)
13. Kaya (version 1) 1971 (2:36)
14. African Herbsman (version) 1971 (2:23)
15. Dracula (Mr Brown (version)) 1970 (2:52)
16. Downpresser (version) 1971 (3:09)
17. Battle Axe (Small Axe (version 1)) 1971 (3:30)
18. Dreamland (version) 1970 (2:37)
19. My Cup (version) 1970 (3:12)
20. Keep On Moving (version) 1971 (3:05)
21. Second Hand (version) 1971 (3:06)

=== Disc 3 ===
1. Black Progress 1970 (2:29)
2. Acoustic Medley: Guava Jelly 1971 (0:42) 0232
3. Acoustic Medley: This Train 1972 (1:46)
4. Acoustic Medley: Corner Stone 1972 (1:55)
5. Acoustic Medley: Comma Comma 1972 (1:24)
6. Acoustic Medley: Dewdrops 1972 (2:24)
7. Acoustic Medley: Stir It Up 1972 (2:08)
8. Acoustic Medley: I'm Hurting Inside 1972 (1:51)
9. Cry To Me (acoustic) 1971 (1:30)
10. Sun Is Shining 1970 (2:11)
11. Heathen's Rage (Sun Is Shining (DJ version)) 1970 (2:03)
12. Satisfy My Soul Babe 1971 (2:06)
13. Don't Rock My Boat 1971 (2:49)
14. I Like It Like This (Don't Rock My Boat (DJ version)) 1971 (2:49)
15. Hold On To This Feeling 1970 (2:54)
16. Rock To The Rock (1968' New York Mix) 1968 (2:24)
17. Rocking Steady (1968' New York Mix) 1968 (2:03)
18. I'm Hurting Inside 1972 (3:36)
19. Music Gonna Teach 1969 (3:03)
20. I'm Still Waiting 1969 (2:53)
21. Babe Version (Satisfy My Soul Babe (dub version)) 1971 (2:56)
22. Sun Is Shining (version 1) 1970 (2:10)
23. Hold On To This Feeling (version) 1970 (2:50)
24. Music Gonna Teach (version) 1969 (3:14)
