= ButterFly (Barbra Streisand album) =

Studio album by Barbra Streisand
- Released: October 1, 1974
- Recorded: 25 March, 18, 19, 22 July 1974
- Studios: A&M (Hollywood); United Western (Hollywood)
- Genre: Contemporary pop
- Length: 35:40
- Label: Columbia
- Producer: Jon Peters

Barbra Streisand chronology
The Way We Were: Original Soundtrack Recording (1974)	ButterFly (1974)	Funny Lady (1975)

Singles from ButterFly
- 1. "Guava Jelly" Released: December 16, 1974; 2. "Jubilation" Released: April 1975

ButterFly is the sixteenth studio album by American singer Barbra Streisand. Released on October 1, 1974, by Columbia Records, it marked Streisand's first album of entirely new material in over three years. Primarily a contemporary pop record recorded throughout 1974, it also incorporates music from the reggae and R&B genres. All of the tracks on ButterFly are cover songs produced by Streisand's then-boyfriend Jon Peters, originating from artists like Bob Marley, David Bowie, Evie Sands, and Graham Nash.

The album received mixed reviews from music critics who questioned whether or not Peters' experience in the music industry was enough for him to produce an entire album. However, Tom Scott's involvement with the album was praised, particularly his position as an arranger. Commercially, the album peaked in the lower positions of charts in Australia, Canada, and the United States. It would later be certified gold by the Recording Industry Association of America for physical shipments exceeding 500,000 copies. "Guava Jelly" and "Jubilation" were released as the album's two singles in December 1974 and April 1975, respectively.

The 8-track cartridge and cassette tape versions, as well as some international vinyl versions, swapped the front and back artwork and instead displays an illustration of Streisand's face and hair surrounded by colorful butterflies rather than the original LP's image of a fly on a stick of butter.

== Background and recording ==
Earlier in January 1974, Streisand released The Way We Were and the official soundtrack to the film The Way We Were (1973), both of which were commercially successful, with the former album selling over 2 million copies in the United States. The Way We Were predominantly featured material from Streisand's unreleased album The Singer, with only three tracks recorded specifically for the new project. ButterFly was Streisand's first album of completely new material in over three years and was produced solely by her then-boyfriend, Jon Peters. Due to Peters' minimal experience in the music industry, it was suggested by AllMusic's William Ruhlmann that the album's overall sound was orchestrated more by saxophonist Tom Scott rather than Peters. Streisand also collaborated with several composers and musicians for ButterFly, including John Bahler, Hank Cicalo, John Guerin, and Clarence McDonald.

Recording sessions for the album took place at A&M Studios and United-Western Recorders in Los Angeles between February and July 1974. "I Won't Last a Day Without You", "Since I Don't Have You", and "Crying Time" were amongst the earliest tracks to be recorded, all during a session on March 25, 1974, at United-Western. The remaining tracks on the album were all recorded throughout July 1974 at A&M Studios. Scott and composer Lee Holdridge handled the arrangement of the ten tracks, while John Bahler arranged the horns and vocal production. Streisand and Columbia Records released ButterFly on October 1, 1974, as her sixteenth studio album overall, distributed months after The Way We Were. The same label issued the album as an 8-track cartridge in 1974, with the track listing switching the order of "Jubilation" and "Crying Time" around. The album was later released in a compact disc format on October 25, 1990.

== Music and lyrics ==
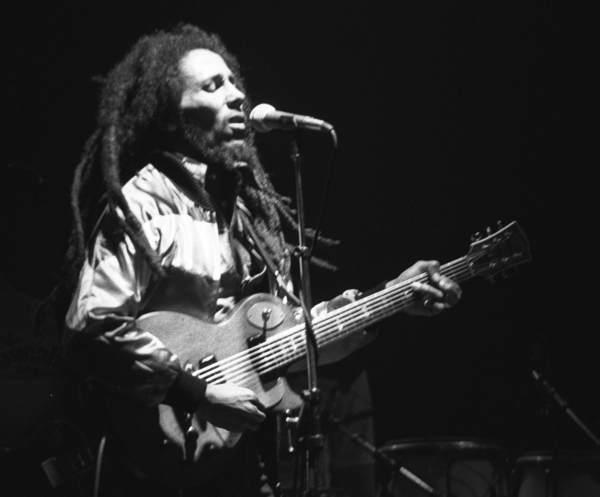
Bob Marley's "Guava Jelly" was covered by Streisand and released as the lead single from ButterFly.

On ButterFly, Streisand departed from the pop and rock influences that were strong on her previous efforts and instead relied more on a variety of experimental, contemporary pop music. The singer also explored the reggae and classic R&B genres that were, at the time, popular on mainstream radio. The album opens with a "seductive" version of "Love in the Afternoon", a song originally performed by American singer Evie Sands earlier in 1974. It was written by Sands, Ben Geminaro, and Richard Wiseman; production of "Love in the Afternoon" and all songs on ButterFly were solely handled by Peters. "Guava Jelly" is track two and a cover of Bob Marley's 1971 single. One of the reggae songs on the album, it features "risqué lyrics" that suggest that guava jelly could be used as a type of sexual lubricant. Bill Withers's R&B ballad "Grandma's Hands" follows and is primarily a "gospel-flavored" song. Lyrically, it details a woman who shares a strong bond with her grandmother. "I Won't Last a Day Without You" is the fourth track and a cover of the Carpenters' 1974 single; it was written by Paul Williams and Roger Nichols. The album's second and final single, "Jubilation", was a song made famous by Paul Anka in 1972. In response to Streisand's rendition of the track, Anka questioned her decision to have Peters produce but remarked, "Barbra can sing the phone book. She has no problem singing anything. She's got one of the great voices".

Track six is "Simple Man", originally performed by Graham Nash for his debut album, Songs for Beginners (1971). Written about an individual getting over a bad relationship, Nash wrote the song immediately after breaking up with his then-girlfriend Joni Mitchell. David Bowie's "Life on Mars" is the seventh track, also written by Bowie. During an interview with Playboy in 1975, Bowie was asked what he thought regarding Streisand's cover; disappointed, he claimed that it was "bloody awful" and "atrocious". The preceding track ("Since I Don't Have You") was written by seven of the band members from the Skyliners and advertised as a "classic" on ButterFly. "Crying Time" and "Let the Good Times Roll" finish off the record, serving as the ninth and tenth tracks, respectively. The former song was written by Buck Owens, originally performed by Ray Charles, and previously recorded by Streisand during a live television special called Barbra Streisand…and Other Musical Instruments in 1973. Author Francis David compared Streisand's vocal capabilities on the track to those of Aretha Franklin's. Meanwhile, "Let the Good Times Roll" is a cover of the 1956 Shirley & Lee original. Written by Leonard Lee and Shirley Goodman, Goodman does not receive a writing credit on the album's official liner notes and would later take Lee to federal court to receive credit.

== Singles ==
The album's lead single "Guava Jelly" was released as a 7" record on December 16, 1974, two months after the release of ButterFly. It was paired with "Love in the Afternoon" and "Life on Mars" as a B-side track in the United States and the Netherlands, respectively. "Jubilation" was the record's second and final single, released in April 1975 by Columbia in the same physical formats as "Guava Jelly". On the Germany release of "Jubilation", it would be paired with B-side "Crying Time", but the Canada and United States versions featured "Let the Good Times Roll" instead.

== Critical reception ==
Professional ratings
Review scores
Source	Rating
AllMusic	3/5 stars

ButterFly has received mixed reviews from music critics. In a highly positive review, a critic from Billboard described it as "possibly the finest LP Ms. Streisand has ever come up with, artistically and commercially". The reviewer lauded her vocals and her ability to adapt to the music while also taking a liking to Peters' production capabilities. The critic also recommended "Love in the Afternoon", "Guava Jelly", "Grandma's Hands", "Jubilation", "Life on Mars", "Since I Don't Have You", and "Let the Good Times Roll" as the album's "best cuts". In a retrospective review for AllMusic, William Ruhlmann was disappointed by the singer's decision to work with Peters on the album. He felt that Peters' background in the music industry was "nonexistent" and instead highlighted Tom Scott, the album's arranger, as the "real power on the album". Concluding, Ruhlmann claimed that although ButterFly is a charming album, it ultimately only sold to Streisand's fan base rather than the general public.

Ben Gerson from Rolling Stone called the songs on the album "forgettable" and "unconvincing". He also criticized Streisand's authenticity when singing lyrics that he considered "meaningless from the lips of an American". Because of the lackluster response generated from the record, Streisand decided to work with new musicians on her following album, Lazy Afternoon (1975). Her decision pleased both critics and her fans, who felt that the new album was stronger than ButterFly. Years later in 1991, Streisand was a guest on Larry King Live and, when asked by Larry which was her least favorite album, Barbra cited ButterFly. When he pressed her on it, Streisand replied, "I don't remember recording it. I don't even know what songs are on it."

== Commercial performance ==
In the United States, ButterFly debuted at number 72 on the Billboard 200 chart for the week ending November 16, 1974. The following week it rose to number 52 and on January 4, 1975, it reached its peak position at number 13. The record spent a total of 24 consecutive weeks on the Billboard 200. ButterFly was commercially less successful than its predecessor, which topped the Billboard 200. However, due to the album's strong sales, the Recording Industry Association of America (RIAA) certified ButterFly gold on January 6, 1975, for physical shipments exceeding 500,000 copies. In Canada, the album peaked at a slightly higher position. It debuted on the list, compiled by RPM, at number 92 on November 23, 1974, and 11 weeks later it would peak at number 11 on February 15, 1975. In total, it spent 17 weeks charting in that country. It also charted in Australia, where it peaked at number 49 according to the Kent Music Report.

== Track listing ==
ButterFly – Standard edition
No.	Title	Writer(s)	Length
1.	"Love in the Afternoon"	Richard Germinaro; Evie Sands; Ben Weisman	4:07
2.	"Guava Jelly"	Bob Marley	3:19
3.	"Grandma's Hands"	Bill Withers	3:27
4.	"I Won't Last a Day Without You"	Paul Williams; Roger Nichols	4:16
5.	"Jubilation"	Paul Anka; Johnny Harris	3:52
6.	"Simple Man"	Graham Nash	3:03
7.	"Life on Mars"	David Bowie	3:13
8.	"Since I Don't Have You"	Lenny Martin; Joseph Rock; Jackie Taylor; James Beaumont; Janet Vogel; Wally Lester; Joe Verscharen	2:52
9.	"Crying Time"	Buck Owens	2:51
10.	"Let the Good Times Roll"	Leonard Lee	4:57
Total length:			35:40

ButterFly – 8-track cartridge edition
No.	Title	Length
1.	"Love in the Afternoon"	4:07
2.	"Guava Jelly"	3:19
3.	"Grandma's Hands"	3:27
4.	"I Won't Last a Day Without You"	4:16
5.	"Crying Time"	2:51
6.	"Simple Man"	3:03
7.	"Life on Mars"	3:13
8.	"Since I Don't Have You"	2:52
9.	"Jubilation"	3:52
10.	"Let the Good Times Roll"	4:57
Total length:		35:40

== Personnel ==
Credits adapted from the liner notes of the CD edition of ButterFly.

- Barbra Streisand – vocals, backing vocals
- John Bahler – horn and vocal arrangements (tracks 2, 3, 7, 10)
- Ben Benay, Larry Carlton – guitar
- Max Bennett – bass guitar
- Gary Coleman – percussion
- King Errisson – congas
- John Guerin – drums
- Lee Holdridge – arrangements (tracks 4, 8, 9)
- Clarence McDonald – keyboards
- Tom Scott – arrangements (tracks 1–3, 6, 7, 10), woodwind, flute, tenor saxophone

Technical

- Jon Peters – production, art direction, album design
- Hank Cicalo – engineer (tracks 1–3, 6, 7, 10)
- Michael Lietz – engineer (tracks 4, 8, 9)
- Steve Schapiro – inside photography
- William Alan Shirley – back cover artwork
- Carl Furuta – front photography

== Charts ==
Chart performance for ButterFly
Chart (1974–1975)	Peak position
Australia Albums (Kent Music Report)	49
Canada Top Albums/CDs (RPM)	11
US Billboard 200	13
US Cashbox Top Albums	10

== Certifications ==
Region	Certification	Certified units/sales
United States (RIAA)	Gold	500,000^{^}
^{^} Shipments figures based on certification alone.
