= I Can See Clearly Now (Johnny Nash album) =

Studio album by Johnny Nash
- Released: July 21, 1972
- Recorded: 1971−72
- Genre: Reggae
- Length: 34:56
- Label: Epic
- Producer: Johnny Nash

Johnny Nash chronology
Let's Go Dancing (1969)	I Can See Clearly Now (1972)	My Merry-Go-Round (1973)

Professional ratings
Review scores
Source	Rating
Christgau's Record Guide	B
The Rolling Stone Album Guide	3/5 stars

I Can See Clearly Now is an album by the American singer Johnny Nash, released in 1972. The album includes two of his biggest hit singles, the title track ("I Can See Clearly Now") and "Stir It Up." "I Can See Clearly Now" hit number one on the Billboard Hot 100 on November 4, 1972. Nash's backing band for the album was the Jamaican reggae group Fabulous Five Inc.

== Track listing ==
All tracks composed and arranged by Johnny Nash; except where indicated

1. "Stir It Up" (Bob Marley)
2. "That's the Way We Get By" (John "Rabbit" Bundrick)
3. "Guava Jelly" (Bob Marley)
4. "(It Was) So Nice While It Lasted"
5. "Ooh Baby You've Been Good to Me"
6. "You Poured Sugar on Me" (Bob Marley, Johnny Nash)
7. "I Can See Clearly Now"
8. "Comma Comma" (Bob Marley)
9. "We're All Alike" (John "Rabbit" Bundrick)
10. "How Good It Is"
11. "The Fish and the Alley of Destruction" (on original pressings), later replaced by "Cream Puff" (Margaret Nash)
12. "There Are More Questions Than Answers"

== Charts ==
Chart (1972)	Peak position
Australia (Kent Music Report)	29
US Billboard Top LPs & Tape	23

== Personnel ==
- Bernie O'Gorman, Jack Clegg, John Middleton, Siddey - engineers
- Denis Waugh - cover photography
- Tim Fulford-Brown - back cover photography
- Marty Pekar - liner notes
