= Love Me Baby =

Love Me Baby may refer to:

- "Love Me Baby" (Sheila and B. Devotion song), 1977
- "Love Me Baby" (Praga Khan song)

== See also ==
- Rock Me Baby (disambiguation)
