= Rock Me Baby (Johnny Nash song) =

Single by Johnny Nash

from the album Here Again
- B-side: Love Theme From "Rock Me Baby"
- Released: October 25, 1985
- Recorded: 1984
- Genre: Reggae
- Length: 4:30 (album version); 3:58 (single version)
- Label: London Records
- Songwriter(s): Johnny Nash
- Producer(s): Johnny Nash, Alvin A. Davies

Johnny Nash singles chronology
"(What a) Wonderful World" (1976)	"'Rock Me Baby'" (1985)	"Baby You're Mine" (1986)

"Rock Me Baby" is a 1985 song by Johnny Nash. The song appeared on his Here Again album, released early the following year.

After the release, the song was a minor hit in the United Kingdom but did not chart on the U.S. Billboard Hot 100. It was a bigger success in other European nations like Germany and Switzerland. Due to the lack of success in the United States, however, a music video was never shot for the song.

== Track listings ==
7" Single

1. Rock Me Baby 3:58
2. Love Theme From "Rock Me Baby" 4:25

== Charts ==
Chart (1985–1986)	Peak position
UK Singles Chart	47
German Singles Chart	9
Austrian Singles Chart	2
Swiss Singles Chart	2
Dutch Top 40	17
Norwegian Singles Chart	2

== Cover versions ==
- 1986: Jamaika Thorsten und die Kokosnüsse (Komm wir düsen nach Jamaika (engl. Let's go to Jamaika))
- 1990: Ulli Bäer (Pack mi Baby)
- 1998: Wildecker Herzbuben
- 2009: Gentleman
