= Funny Lady =

1975 musical film directed by Herbert Ross

- Theatrical poster
- Directed by: Herbert Ross
- Screenplay by: Jay Presson Allen; Arnold Schulman
- Story by: Arnold Schulman
- Produced by: Ray Stark
- Starring: Barbra Streisand; James Caan; Roddy McDowall; Ben Vereen; Carole Wells; Omar Sharif
- Cinematography: James Wong Howe
- Edited by: Marion Rothman
- Music by: John Kander; Fred Ebb; Peter Matz
- Production company: Rastar
- Distributed by: Columbia Pictures
- Release date: March 12, 1975
- Running time: 136 minutes
- Country: United States
- Language: English
- Budget: $8.5 million
- Box office: $40.1 million

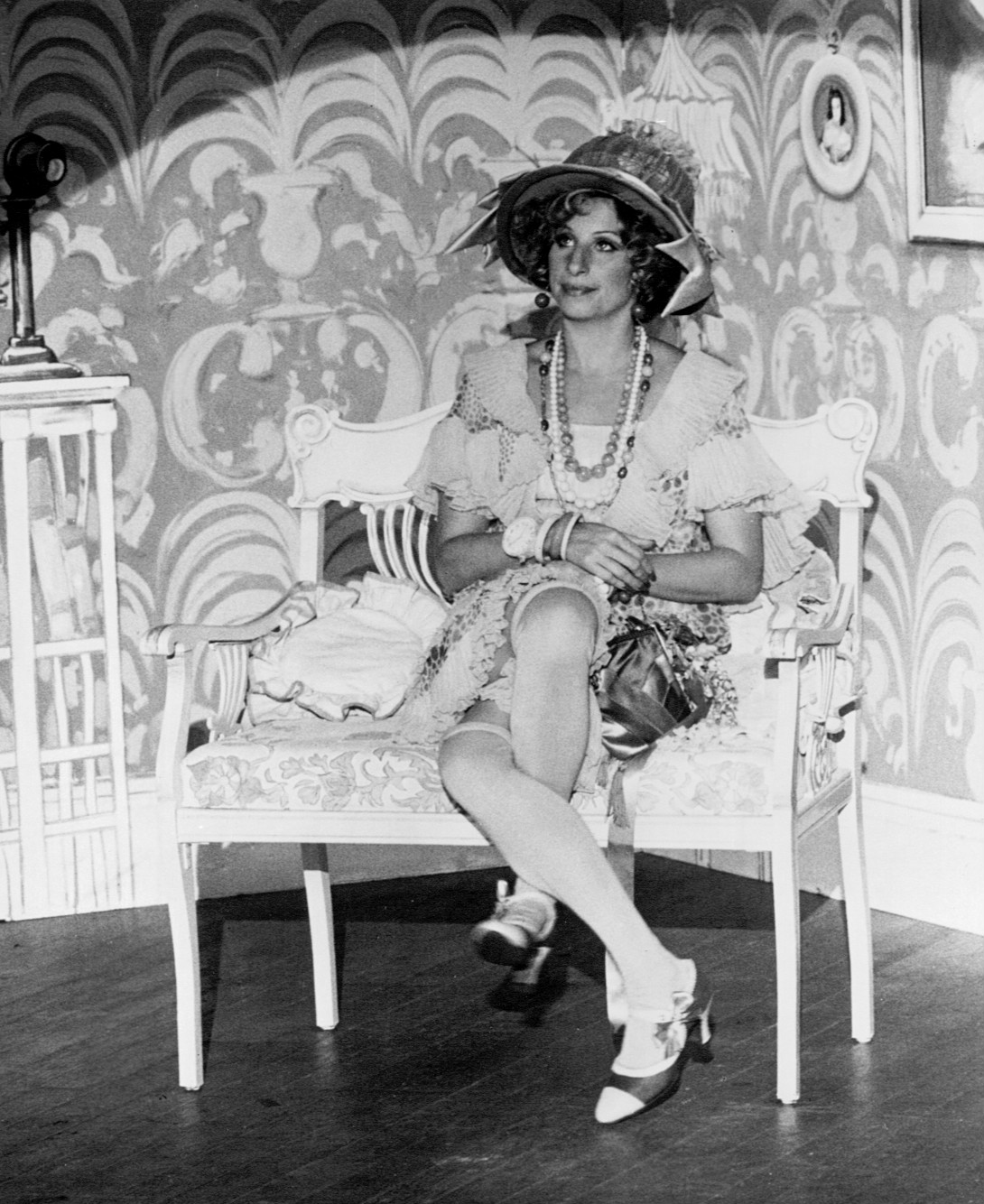
Publicity photo for Funny Girl to Funny Lady, a live TV special promoting the film, hosted by Dick Cavett (March 9, 1975)

Funny Lady is a 1975 American biographical musical comedy-drama film and the sequel to the 1968 film Funny Girl. The film stars Barbra Streisand, James Caan, Omar Sharif, Roddy McDowall and Ben Vereen.

Herbert Ross, who helmed the musical sequences for Funny Girl (which had been directed by William Wyler), serves as the director. The screenplay, written by Jay Presson Allen and Arnold Schulman as based on a story by Schulman, is a highly fictionalized account of the later life and career of comedienne Fanny Brice and her marriage to songwriter and impresario Billy Rose. The primary score was by John Kander and Fred Ebb. The film was nominated for numerous awards including Golden Globe nominations for Streisand as Best Actress and Best Actor for Caan. Streisand revisited the soundtrack to the film in her 2016 concert.

== Plot ==
Comidienne Fanny Brice's Broadway show comes to a close during the Great Depression, and her estranged husband Nicky Arnstein files for divorce. Fanny and her confidant Bobby Moore are out of work; Florenz Ziegfeld is not producing a new musical. Fanny and Bobby visit nightclubs looking for material to "borrow" and hear a torch song in "More Than You Know" that was written by Billy Rose, the former secretary of her financial advisor Bernard Baruch. Rose tries to pressure her into buying the song, and Fanny produces a recording of it. She then reads in a newspaper that she'll star in a show mounted by Rose called Crazy Quilt.

Buck Bolton provides $50,000 to Rose in exchange for Bolton's mistress Norma Butler being cast as a lead. Fanny's big number “I Found A Million Dollar Baby In A Five And Ten Cents Store” is popular but opening night is otherwise a disaster. Fanny is convinced not to quit by learning Billy borrowed money from mobsters who will kill him if he doesn't repay them. Fanny and Billy scale down the show, and it opens in New York to great reviews. Fanny sees Nicky backstage and learns he's remarried a rich woman. Billy and Fanny prepare to take the show to Fort Worth, Texas and agree to marry. After she accepts his proposal, she learns Billy had bluffed about borrowing from the mob in order to keep her close to him.

Fanny's society friends treat Billy poorly at the wedding reception, and they spend their honeymoon in Texas bickering. They grow apart as their careers get busy, to the point they speak to each other when they telephone their publicist at the same time. Billy does a show called Aquacade, starring Eleanor Holm, a 1932 Olympic swim gold medalist. Fanny encounters Bobby Moore and Norma Butler in Los Angeles and sees Nicky on the field of a polo game in Beverly Hills. Billy can't leave Aquacade to join Fanny, so she reminisces with Nicky. She points out Nicky hasn't asked about their daughter Frances, whom he hasn't seen in six years. When Fanny travels to Cleveland, she catches Billy in bed with Eleanor. Billy intercepts her at the train station to apologize, and Fanny states her love for Nicky was gone for good. Blaming herself for Billy's infidelity, she asks him to leave her alone.

More years pass and Fanny is starring in The Baby Snooks Show on radio while Billy has gained success writing popular songs and plays. They meet and he plays "Me And My Shadow", telling Fanny he wrote it about their marriage. He tells her about his recent purchase of the Ziegfeld Theatre in New York City and an idea for her to star in his new show. Fanny promises to consider it, the two kiss, and part once again.

== Cast ==
- Barbra Streisand as Fanny Brice
- James Caan as Billy Rose
- Omar Sharif as Nick Arnstein
- Roddy McDowall as Bobby Moore
- Ben Vereen as Bert Robbins
- Carole Wells as Norma Butler
- Larry Gates as Bernard Baruch
- Heidi O'Rourke as Eleanor Holm

Veteran dance director Louis DaPron made his final onscreen film appearance as the choreographer of the Crazy Quilt production.

=== Uncredited ===
- Jack Angel as the voice of Radio Announcer

== Production ==
=== Development ===
Although contractually bound to make one more film for producer Ray Stark (Fanny Brice's one-time son-in-law), Streisand balked at doing the project. She told Stark "that it would take litigation to make her do a sequel." However, Streisand liked the script, which showed Fanny to be "...tougher, more acerbic, more mature...", and she agreed.

Arnold Schulman wrote a script and got credit but said most of the final screenplay was the work of Jay Presson Allen.

=== Casting ===
The first to read for Billy Rose was Robert Blake. Other actors were mentioned, including Al Pacino and Robert De Niro, but ultimately James Caan was chosen. Streisand explained: "It comes down to whom the audience wants me to kiss. Robert Blake, no. James Caan, yes."

=== Filming ===
Vilmos Zsigmond was the film's original director of photography, but was fired after less than three days by Stark who was unhappy with the footage. Zsigmond and his camera operator Nick McLean later said Stark wanted a more stylized, classical Hollywood fashion of musical photography, while Zsigmond had sought a more realist approach similar to Cabaret, which Stark thought looked too dark. The producer lured an ailing James Wong Howe out of semi-retirement to complete the film. It proved to be his final project, and it earned him an Academy Award nomination.

=== Post-production ===
Studio executives forced Ross to trim the film to a manageable 136 minutes before release. Much of Vereen's performance ended up on the cutting room floor, together with a recreation of Brice's Baby Snooks radio show and dramatic scenes involving her and her daughter.

In addition to Howe, Oscar nominations went to Ray Aghayan and Bob Mackie for Best Costume Design, Kander and Ebb for Best Original Song ("How Lucky Can You Get"), Peter Matz for Best Scoring of an Original Song Score and/or Adaptation, and the sound team. Streisand, Caan and Vereen all received Golden Globe Award nominations, as did Kander and Ebb and the film itself, but it was shut out of any wins in both competitions.

== Reception ==
=== Box office ===
Funny Lady opened Wednesday, March 12, 1975, and grossed $2,254,3851 in its first five days from 111 theatres to be number one at the US box office. It went on to gross $40,055,897 at the U.S. and Canadian box office, making it the seventh highest grossing picture of 1975. It was one of Caan's most successful films at the box office.

=== Critical reception ===
The film received mixed reviews from critics. On the review aggregator website Rotten Tomatoes, 55% of 77 critics' reviews are positive. The website's consensus reads: "Barbra Streisand's spirited performance and stylish visuals notwithstanding, Funny Lady often falters under a thin script and uninspired direction."

Vincent Canby of The New York Times wrote, "As long as Miss Streisand as Fanny is singing the blues, or singing anything else, Funny Lady is superb entertainment, but the minute she stops the movie turns into a concrete soufflé. It's heavy and tasteless ... Moments meant to be dramatic are embarrassingly bad."

Roger Ebert gave the film one star out of four and called it "a big, messy flop of a movie that's almost cruel in the way it invites our memories of Funny Girl and doesn't match them." Gene Siskel of the Chicago Tribune awarded two and a half stars out of four and wrote, "It takes few chances and delivers mostly what you'd expect ... What was missing, for me at least, was a sense of surprise, of unpredictability—the sort of wit or pacing that separates a memorable musical like Cabaret from the merely tuneful."

Pauline Kael of The New Yorker wrote, "Streisand is in beautiful voice, and her singing is terrific—too terrific. It's no longer singing, it's something else—that strident overdramatization that turns a song into a big number. The audience's attention is directed away from the music and onto the star's feat in charging it with false energy. Streisand is out to knock you cold, and you get cold, all right." Kael also criticized the plot as "right out of those terrible forties movies in which couples who break up spend a lifetime thinking about each other, with encounters every five or ten years. And we get a double load of it here, with two graying ex-husbands."

Arthur D. Murphy of Variety wrote, "Barbra Streisand was outstanding as the younger Fanny Brice in Funny Girl, and in Funny Lady she's even better ... However much of a letdown the plot becomes, there's no denying the superior integration of drama, comedy, show music and personal dramatic music en route."

Charles Champlin of the Los Angeles Times wrote, "Barbra Streisand, like the picture, extends the characterization she launched so dazzlingly in Funny Girl ... What I find most impressive and likable about the performance is the softened, bittersweet maturity that Streisand lets us see in Fanny Brice. You sense that Streisand understands the star as well as she understood the impetuous young hopeful. An extraordinary presentation is the power and delight of both movies." Gary Arnold of The Washington Post called it a "lavish but uninspired" film that "seems to be celebrating stardom for stardom's sake. It's a joyless, mechanical Big Movie Musical."

Caan thought there were "too many cooks messing around", although he liked his performance.

== Accolades ==
Award	Category	Nominee(s)	Result	Ref.
Academy Awards	Best Cinematography	James Wong Howe	Nominated	
Academy Awards	Best Costume Design	Ray Aghayan and Bob Mackie	Nominated	
Academy Awards	Best Original Score	Peter Matz	Nominated	
Academy Awards	Best Original Song	"How Lucky Can You Get" Music and Lyrics by John Kander and Fred Ebb	Nominated	
Academy Awards	Best Sound	Richard Portman, Don MacDougall, Curly Thirlwell and Jack Solomon	Nominated	
Golden Globe Awards	Best Motion Picture – Musical or Comedy		Nominated	
Golden Globe Awards	Best Actor in a Motion Picture – Musical or Comedy	James Caan	Nominated	
Golden Globe Awards	Best Actress in a Motion Picture – Musical or Comedy	Barbra Streisand	Nominated	
Golden Globe Awards	Best Original Score	John Kander and Fred Ebb	Nominated	
Golden Globe Awards	Best Original Song	"How Lucky Can You Get"; Music and Lyrics by Kander and Ebb	Nominated	
Golden Globe Awards	New Star of the Year – Actor	Ben Vereen	Nominated	

== Soundtrack ==
The soundtrack peaked on the Billboard Album Chart at number 6 and was certified gold. A majority of the songs were written by Kander and Ebb.

== See also ==
- List of American films of 1975
