= Here Again =

Studio album by Johnny Nash
- Released: January 13, 1986
- Recorded: September 1984–September 1985
- Genre: Reggae
- Length: 44:50
- Label: London Records
- Producer: Johnny Nash, Alvin A. Davies

Johnny Nash chronology
Stir It Up (1981)	Here Again (1986)	The Reggae Collection (1993)

Singles from Here Again
- 1. "Rock Me Baby" Released: October 25, 1985; 2. "Baby You're Mine" Released: January 1986; 3. "Here Again" Released: April 1986

Here Again is an album by American singer Johnny Nash, released in 1986. The album features a minor comeback hit, with the late-1985 single "Rock Me Baby" reaching the Top-20 on the Swiss album charts. The follow-up single, "Baby You're Mine" was less successful.

With this album, Nash had hoped for a successful comeback, but it did not make a significant impact on the charts.

== Track listing ==
1. "Born to Sing" (Alvin A. Davies, John Barnes) - (5:09)
2. "Precious Lady" (Alvin A. Davies) = (5:20)
3. "Rock Me Baby" (Johnny Nash) - (4:30)
4. "Island Girl" (Alvin A. Davies) - (4:03)
5. "Baby You're Mine" (Carl Williams) - (3:30)
6. "Mansion in the Sky" (Alvin A. Davies, Odell Brown) - (4:38)
7. "Here Again" (Alvin A. Davies) - (5:50)
8. "We Got Troubles" (Carl Williams) - (4:32)
9. "Now You're Gone" (Alvin A. Davies) - (4:10)
10. "Never Going Back" (Carl Williams) - (4:26)
