= More Than You Know (Youmans, Rose and Eliscu song) =

1929 song from the musical Great Day

"More Than You Know" is a popular song, composed by Vincent Youmans with lyrics by Billy Rose and Edward Eliscu. The song was published in 1929.

The song was introduced in the Broadway musical Great Day where it was sung by Mayo Methot. It was also popularized on the stage and radio by Jane Froman. The most popular contemporary recordings were by Helen Morgan (Victor catalog number 22149), and by Libby Holman (Brunswick catalog number 4613).

The song was subsequently featured in three musical films: Hit the Deck (1955), sung by Tony Martin; Funny Lady (1975), sung by Barbra Streisand (who first recorded it for her 1967 studio album, Simply Streisand); and The Fabulous Baker Boys (1989) sung by Michelle Pfeiffer. It has been recorded by many artists.

== Recorded versions ==
- Mildred Bailey (recorded November 9, 1936, released by Vocalion as catalog number 3378, with the flip side "Long about Midnight"; re-recorded February 12, 1942, released by Decca as catalog number 4267B, with the flip side "I Think of You", and re-released in 1951 by Decca as catalog number 27919, with the flip side "Georgia on My Mind")
- Count Basie and his orchestra (recorded November 17, 1941; released by OKeh as catalog number 6584, with the flip side "Down for Double")
- Randy Brooks and his orchestra (recorded May 2, 1946, released by Decca as catalog number 27205, with the flip side "Holiday Forever"
- Buddy Clark (recorded August 21, 1947, released by Columbia as catalog number 37911, with the flip side "When Day Is Done")
- Ella Fitzgerald, Like Someone in Love released 1957.
- Sarah Vaughan, Sarah Vaughan and Billy Eckstine Sing the Best of Irving Berlin released 1957.
- Blossom Dearie - Blossom Dearie (1957)
- Ann-Margret recorded a version on her 1961 debut album, And Here She Is ... Ann-Margret
- Cher (recorded 1973 for Bittersweet White Light album)
- Dr. John, In a Sentimental Mood released April 25, 1989.
- Sonny Burke and his orchestra (released by OKeh as catalog number 5955, with the flip side "Count Basically")
- Billy Butterfield and his orchestra (released by Capitol as catalog number 815, with the flip side "How Am I to Know?")
- Benny Carter and his orchestra (vocal: R. Felton; recorded November 1, 1939, released by Conqueror as catalog number 9460 and by Vocalion as catalog number 5508, both with the flip side "Shufflebug Shuffle")
- Russ Case and his orchestra (released by MGM as catalog number 30335, with the flip side "It's Only a Paper Moon")
- Judy Clay (released 1961 in the United States by Ember as catalog number 1080 and in Canada by Reo Records as catalog number, both with the flip side "I Thought I'd Gotten Over You")
- Larry Clinton and his orchestra (released by Cosmo Records as catalog number 704, with the flip side "I Don't Know Why")
- Perry Como [recorded March 12, 1946 (released by RCA Victor as catalog number 20-1877-B with the flip side "Surrender", and by His Master's Voice in the United Kingdom as catalog number with the flip side "A Garden in the Rain") and January 11, 1951 (released by RCA Victor as catalog number 20-4033, with the flip side "Without a Song"), Re-recorded in 1957 with Mitchell Ayers & His Orchestra on the LP "Dream Along with Me" (RCA/Camden CAS-403).
- Bing Crosby recorded the song in 1956 for use on his radio show and it was subsequently included in the box set The Bing Crosby CBS Radio Recordings (1954-56) issued by Mosaic (catalog MD7-245) in 2009.
- Morton Downey (recorded April 1946, released by Majestic as catalog number 1047, with the flip side "My Romance")
- Mike Durso and his orchestra (released by MGM as catalog number 30644, with the flip side "I've Told Ev'ry Little Star")
- Billy Eckstine with Lou Bring's orchestra (released by MGM as catalog number 11948, with the flip side "Give Me Another Chance")
- Larry Elgart and his orchestra (recorded January 26, 1954; released by Decca as catalog number 29043, with the flip side "You're Driving Me Crazy")
- Ruth Etting (recorded November 12, 1929; released by Columbia as catalog number 2038D with the flip side "A Place to Call Home")
- Benny Goodman Trio (recorded April 24, 1936, released by Victor as catalog number 25345 and by Bluebird as catalog number 10723, both with the flip side "Nobody's Sweetheart")
- Larry Green (released by RCA Victor as catalog number 20-3664, with the flip side "Time on My Hands")
- Walter Gross (piano solo; released by MGM as catalog number 30467A, with the flip side "Tea for Two" and by Musicraft as catalog number 387, with the flip side "Sometimes I'm Happy")
- Johnny Guarnieri (recorded November, 1947, released by Majestic as catalog number 1229, with the flip side "Smoke Gets in Your Eyes")
- Corky Hale (released 1970 by Bell as catalog number 864, with the flip side "Maybe Tomorrow")
- Erskine Hawkins and his orchestra (recorded October 2, 1939; released by Bluebird as catalog number 10504A, with the flip side "Uptown Shuffle")
- The Hi-Lo's (on their 1962 LP, This Time It's Love, with orchestral accompaniment arranged and conducted by Clare Fischer)
- Libby Holman and orchestra (recorded November 1929; released by Brunswick as catalog number 4613, with the flip side "Happy Because I'm in Love")
- Billie Holiday with Teddy Wilson and His Orchestra (recorded January 30, 1939; released by Brunswick as catalog number 8319, backed with "Sugar")
- Stacey Kent (first released in the album Close Your Eyes, Candid Productions Ltd, 1997, catalog number CCD79737)
- Carol Lawrence (released 1962 by Ava as catalog number 102, with the flip side "Tell Me Lies")
- James Moody (released by Royal Roost as catalog number 545, with the flip side "Deep Purple")
- Helen Morgan (recorded October 8, 1929, released by Victor as catalog number 22149B, with the flip side "What Wouldn't I Do for That Man?", also released by Victor as catalog number 27684, with the flip side "Give Me a Heart to Sing to")
- Gene Mumford (released by Columbia as catalog number 41233, with the flip side "Please Give Me One More Chance")
- Red Norvo and his orchestra (vocal: Mildred Bailey; recorded February 10, 1938, released by Brunswick as catalog number 8085, with the flip side "Serenade to the Stars")
- Flip Phillips (recorded approximately 1945, released by Signature as catalog number 28123B, with the flip side "Without Woody")
- Debbie Reynolds and Tony Martin (released by MGM as catalog number 30877, as a medley with "A Kiss or Two," with the flip side "I Know that You Know")
- A version by Frank Sinatra appears on his triple album Trilogy: Past Present Future (1980).
- Jennie Smith (released 1968 by GNP Crescendo as catalog number 401, with the flip side "I Wanna Be Free")
- Muggsy Spanier and his orchestra (recorded June 1, 1942, released by Decca as catalog number 4328B and by Brunswick as catalog number 80142, both with the flip side "American Patrol")
- Barbra Streisand (recorded 1967 for Simply Streisand album; recorded 1975 for soundtrack to Funny Lady))
- Lee Wiley (recorded 1951, released by Columbia as catalog number 39803, with the flip side "Rise 'n' Shine")
- Teddy Wilson and his orchestra, vocal by Billie Holiday (recorded January 30, 1939; released by Brunswick as catalog number 8319 and by Columbia as catalog number 36117 both with the flip side "Sugar"
- Cybill Shepherd (2003; The Memphis Belles - Past, Present & Future, Inside Sounds 517)
- Minnie Mouse (Russi Taylor) (2022 - The MousePack - Mickey and Friends Singing Classic Standards, this was one of Taylor's final recordings as Minnie, the recording was released posthumously)

== See also ==
- List of 1920s jazz standards
