= JAD Records =

- Founded: 1967
- Founder: Johnny Nash, Arthur Jenkins, Danny Sims
- Country of origin: United States

Formed in 1967 JAD Records was a record label that was co-owned by Johnny Nash, producer Arthur Jenkins, and businessman Danny Sims, whose initials formed its logo. JAD Records was the label which signed Bob Marley, Peter Tosh, Bunny Wailer and Rita Marley to an exclusive long-term contract as recording artists from 1968 to 1972. Other notable artists to sign with the label included Johnny Nash himself, Byron Lee, Neville Willoughby and later Jimmy Cliff.

In 1996 JAD released a set of reworked songs from the early years of Bob Marley's career on an album called Soul Almighty - The Formative Years Vol 1. This was followed by Black Progress - The Formative Years Vol 2. Both albums used the vocal tracks from Bob's early material from the 1960s and added modern backing tracks including vocals from Rita Marley, Bob's son Ziggy and members of the Melody Makers. The response to these modern day remixes was so hostile that the label released the groundbreaking Complete Bob Marley & The Wailers 1967 to 1972 series produced by Roger Steffens and Bruno Blum containing over 240 original tracks over the next six years, including more than a hundred previously unreleased recordings. Despite their best efforts they could not license the tracks that were already under contract to Island (as part of the Songs Of Freedom box set). However, several years later they managed to license all the tracks and various sets containing some of them were reissued on the now JAD/Universal records in 2004.
