= Johnny Nash =

American singer (1940–2020)

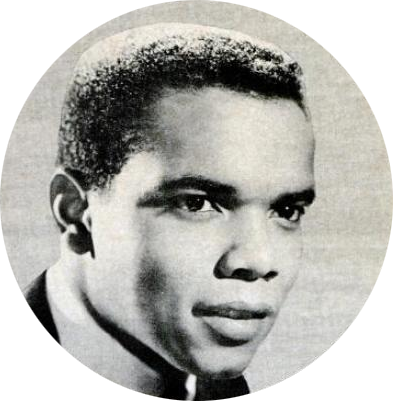
- Nash in 1965

Background information
- Born: John Lester Nash Jr. August 19, 1940; Houston, Texas, U.S.
- Died: October 6, 2020 (aged 80) Houston, Texas, U.S.
- Genres: Pop; jazz; soul; reggae
- Occupations: Singer; songwriter; actor
- Years active: 1956–2020
- Labels: Epic; JAD; Cayman Music
- Website: johnnynash.com

John Lester Nash Jr. (August 19, 1940 – October 6, 2020) was an American singer and songwriter, best known in the United States for his 1972 hit "I Can See Clearly Now". Primarily a reggae and pop singer, he was one of the first non-Jamaican artists to record reggae music in Kingston, Jamaica.

== Early life ==
Nash was born on August 19, 1940, in Houston, Texas, the son of Eliza (Armstrong) and John Lester Nash. He sang in the choir at Progressive New Hope Baptist Church in South Central Houston as a child. Beginning in 1953, Nash sang covers of R&B hits on Matinee, a local variety show on KPRC-TV; from 1956 he sang on Arthur Godfrey's radio and television programs for a seven-year period.

== Career ==
=== 1950s ===
Signing with ABC-Paramount, Nash made his major label debut in 1957 with the single "A Teenager Sings the Blues". He had his first chart hit in early 1958 with a cover of Doris Day's "A Very Special Love". Marketed as a rival to Johnny Mathis, Nash also enjoyed success as an actor early in his career, appearing in the screen version of playwright Louis S. Peterson's Take a Giant Step in 1959. Nash won a Silver Sail Award for his performance from the Locarno International Film Festival. Nash continued releasing singles on a variety of labels such as Groove, Chess, Argo, and Warner Bros. The song "The Teen Commandments" by Paul Anka, George Hamilton IV, and Johnny Nash reached #14 on Canada's CHUM Charts, December 15, 1958.

=== 1960s ===
Nash sang the theme song to the syndicated animated cartoon series The Mighty Hercules, which ran on various television stations from 1963 to 1966.

In 1964, Nash and manager Danny Sims formed JoDa Records in New York. JoDa released The Cowsills' single "All I Really Want to Be Is Me". Although JoDa filed for bankruptcy after only two years, Nash and Sims moved on to marketing American singers to Jamaica, owing to the low cost of recording in that country.

In 1965, Nash had a top-five hit in the US Billboard R&B chart, the ballad "Let's Move and Groove Together". It was just outside the Top 40 in Canada at #44. That year, he and Sims moved to Jamaica. Their lawyer Newton Willoughby was the father of Jamaican radio host Neville Willoughby.

After selling off his old entertainment assets in New York, Sims opened a new music publishing business in Jamaica, Cayman Music. Nash planned to try breaking the local rocksteady sound in the United States. Around 1966 or 1967, Neville Willoughby took Nash to a Rastafarian party where Bob Marley & The Wailing Wailers were performing. Members Bob Marley, Bunny Wailer, Peter Tosh, and Rita Marley introduced Nash to the local music scene. Nash signed all four to an exclusive publishing contract with Cayman Music for J$50 a week.

In 1967, Nash, Arthur Jenkins, and Sims collaborated to create a new label, JAD Records (after their first names Johnny, Arthur, and Danny), and recorded their albums at Federal Records in Kingston. JAD released Nash's rocksteady single "Hold Me Tight" in 1968; it became a top-five hit in both the U.S. and UK, and number 1 in Canada. The record sold well in Argentina. According to the January 25 issue of Cash Box, both Nash's version and a version by Anthony Swete were selling strongly. It was charting alongside a version by Anthony Swete in the Argentina's Best Sellers chart.

=== 1970s ===
In 1971, Nash scored another UK hit with his cover of Marley's "Stir It Up".

Nash's 1972 reggae-influenced single "I Can See Clearly Now" sold more than one million copies, and was awarded a gold disc by the R.I.A.A. in November 1972. "I Can See Clearly Now" reached No. 1 on the Billboard Hot 100 on November 4, 1972, and remained atop the chart for four weeks, spending the same four weeks atop the adult contemporary chart. The I Can See Clearly Now album includes four original Marley compositions published by JAD: "Guava Jelly", "Comma Comma", "You Poured Sugar on Me", and the follow-up hit "Stir It Up". "There Are More Questions Than Answers" was a third hit single taken from the album.

Nash was also a composer for the Swedish romance film Want So Much to Believe (1971), in which he portrayed 'Robert'. The movie soundtrack, partly instrumental reggae with strings, was co-composed by Bob Marley and arranged by Fred Jordan.

JAD Records ceased to exist in 1971, but it was revived in 1997 by American Marley specialist Roger Steffens and French musician and producer Bruno Blum for the Complete Bob Marley & the Wailers 1967–1972 ten-album series, for which several of the Nash-produced Marley and Tosh tracks were mixed or remixed by Blum for release. In the UK, his biggest hit was with the song "Tears on My Pillow" which reached number one in the UK Singles Chart in July 1975 for one week. The album Tears on My Pillow came out later in the year.

After a cover of Sam Cooke's "Wonderful World" in 1976 and "Let's Go Dancing" in 1979, for many years Nash seemed to have dropped out of sight.

=== Later career ===
Nash had a brief resurgence in the mid-1980s with the album Here Again (1986), which included the minor UK hit, "Rock Me Baby". Younger audiences were introduced to Nash's music with the appearance of Jimmy Cliff's cover of "I Can See Clearly Now" in Disney's 1993 film Cool Runnings. Nash's version of the song appeared over the opening scene of John Cusack's 1997 film, Grosse Point Blank.

In May 2006, Nash worked with SugarHill Recording Studios chief engineer Andy Bradley and Tierra Studios' Randy Miller to transfer analog tapes of his songs from the 1970s and 1980s to Pro Tools digital format.

=== Acting ===
Nash has four acting credits in film and television. In 1959, he had the lead role as Spencer Scott in Take a Giant Step, directed by Philip Leacock, one of the first black family films written by a black writer. In 1960, he appeared as "Apple" alongside Dennis Hopper in the crime drama Key Witness. In 1971, he played Robert in the Swedish romance Vill så gärna tro.

== Personal life ==
Nash was married three times and had three children. One child was left behind in Kingston, Jamaica, and is now located in Montreal, Canada.

Nash died of natural causes in his home, surrounded by close family in Houston on October 6, 2020, after a period of declining health. He was 80.

Rapper Scarface (born Brad Jordan in 1970) claims to be a cousin of Nash.

== Selected discography ==
=== Albums ===
Source: AllMusic

Year	Title	Peak chart positions				Record label
Year	Title	US	US R&B	AUS	UK	Record label
1958	Johnny Nash	—	—	—	—	ABC Paramount
1959	I Got Rhythm	—	—	—	—	ABC Paramount
1959	Quiet Hour	—	—	—	—	ABC Paramount
1960	Let's Get Lost	—	—	—	—	ABC Paramount
1961	Studio Time	—	—	—	—	ABC Paramount
1964	Composer's Choice	—	—	—	—	Argo
1968	Hold Me Tight	109	23	—	—	JAD
1969	Prince of Peace	—	—	—	—	JAD
1969	Soul Folk	—	—	—	—	JAD
1969	Love and Peace	—	—	—	—	JAD
1972	Teardrops in the Rain	—	—	—	—	Cadet
1972	I Can See Clearly Now	23	10	29	39	Epic
1973	My Merry-Go-Round	169	49	—	—	Epic
1974	Celebrate Life	—	—	—	—	Epic
1975	Tears on My Pillow	—	—	—	—	CBS
1977	What a Wonderful World	—	—	—	—	Epic
1978	Love Me Tender	—	—	—	—	Bellaphon
1979	Let's Go Dancing	—	—	—	—	Epic
1986	Here Again	—	—	—	—	London
"—" denotes releases that did not chart.

=== Compilations ===
Source: AllMusic

Year	Album	UK	Certifications	Record label
1974	Johnny Nash's Greatest Hits	—	BPI: Silver	CBS
1977	Johnny Nash Collection	18	BPI: Gold	Epic
1981	Stir It Up	—		Hallmark
1993	The Reggae Collection	—		Epic
"—" denotes releases that did not chart.

=== Soundtrack ===
Nash sang the theme song for the television cartoon series The Mighty Hercules, which aired in first-run syndication from 1963 to 1966.

=== Singles ===
Source: AllMusic

Year	Single (A-side, B-side) Both sides from same album except where indicated	Chart positions							Certifications	Album
Year	Single (A-side, B-side) Both sides from same album except where indicated	US	US Cashbox	US R&B	US A/C	UK	CAN	AUS	Certifications	Album
1956	"A Teenager Sings the Blues" b/w "Out of Town"	—	—	—	—	—	—	—		Non-album tracks
1957	"I'll Walk Alone" b/w "The Ladder of Love" (Charted in Canada)	—	—	—	—	—	29	—		Non-album tracks
1957	"A Very Special Love" b/w "Won't You Let Me Share My Love with You"	23	30	—	—	—	—	—		Non-album tracks
1958	"My Pledge to You" b/w "It's So Easy to Say"	—	—	—	—	—	24	—		Non-album tracks
1958	"Please Don't Go" b/w "I Lost My Love Last Night"	—	—	—	—	—	—	—		Non-album tracks
1958	"You're Looking at Me" b/w "Truly Love"	—	98	—	—	—	—	—		Non-album tracks
1958	"Almost in Your Arms" b/w "Midnight Moonlight" (from Johnny Nash)	78	49	—	—	—	23	—		Non-album tracks
1958	"The Teen Commandments"; Paul Anka, George Hamilton IV, Johnny Nash; B-side by Don Costa: "If You Learn to Pray"	29	46	—	—	—	14	41		Non-album tracks
1959	"Walk with Faith in Your Heart" b/w "Roots of Heaven"	—	48	—	—	—	—	—		Non-album tracks
1959	"As Time Goes By" b/w "The Voice of Love"	43	48	—	—	—	25	—		Non-album tracks
1959	"And the Angels Sing" b/w "Baby, Baby, Baby"	—	—	—	—	—	—	—		I Got Rhythm
1959	"Take a Giant Step" b/w "But Not for Me"	—	119	—	—	—	—	—		Non-album tracks
1959	"The Wish" b/w "Too Proud"	—	—	—	—	—	—	—		Non-album tracks
1960	"Goodbye" b/w "A Place in the Sun"	—	—	—	—	—	—	—		Non-album tracks
1960	"Never My Love" b/w "(You've Got) The Love I Love" (from I Got Rhythm)	—	—	—	—	—	—	—		Non-album tracks
1960	"Let the Rest of the World Go By" b/w "Music of Love" (non-album track)	—	—	—	—	—	—	—		Let's Get Lost
1960	"Looks Like the End of the World" b/w "We Kissed"	—	—	—	—	—	—	—		Non-album tracks
1960	"Somebody" b/w "Kisses"	—	—	—	—	—	—	—		Non-album tracks
1961	"Some of Your Lovin'" b/w "World of Tears"	104	93	—	—	—	—	—		Non-album tracks
1961	"I Need Someone to Stand by Me"; Original B-side: "A House on the Hill"; Later B-side: "A Thousand Miles Away"	—	—	—	—	—	—	—		Non-album tracks
1961	"I'm Counting on You" b/w "I Lost My Baby"	—	—	—	—	—	—	—		Non-album tracks
1961	"Too Much Love" b/w "Love's Young Dream"	—	—	—	—	—	—	—		Non-album tracks
1962	"Don't Take Away Your Love" b/w "Moment of Weakness"	—	129	—	—	—	—	—		Non-album tracks
1962	"Ol' Man River" b/w "My Dear Little Sweetheart"	120	91	—	—	—	—	—		Non-album tracks
1963	"I'm Movin' On" b/w "Cigarettes, Whiskey and Wild, Wild Women"	—	—	—	—	—	—	—		Non-album tracks
1963	"I've Got a Lot to Offer Darling" b/w "Helpless"	—	—	—	—	—	—	—		Non-album tracks
1963	"Deep in the Heart of Harlem" b/w "What Kind of Love Is This"	—	—	—	—	—	—	—		Non-album tracks
1963	"Town of Lonely Hearts" b/w "It's No Good for Me"	—	—	—	—	—	—	—		Non-album tracks
1964	"I'm Leaving" b/w "Oh Mary Don't You Weep"	120	103	—	—	—	—	—		Non-album tracks
1964	"Love Ain't Nothin'" b/w "Talk to Me"	—	133	—	—	—	—	—		Teardrops in the Rain
1964	"Then You Can Tell Me Goodbye" b/w "Always" (non-album track)	—	—	—	—	—	—	—		Teardrops in the Rain
1965	"Strange Feeling" b/w "Spring Is Here" (from Composer's Choice)	—	—	—	—	—	—	—		Teardrops in the Rain
1965	"Teardrops in the Rain" b/w "I Know What I Want"	—	—	—	—	—	—	—		Teardrops in the Rain
1965	"Let's Move & Groove Together" b/w "Understanding" (from Love Me Tender)	88	92	4	—	—	44	—		Non-album track
1966	"Get Myself Together" b/w "Teardrops in the Rain"	—	—	—	—	—	—	—		Teardrops in the Rain
1966	"One More Time" b/w "Tryin' to Find Her"	—	—	—	—	—	—	—		Love Me Tender
1966	"Somewhere" b/w "Big City"	120	118	35	—	—	—	—		Love Me Tender
1966	"Amen" b/w "Perfumed Flower"	—	—	—	—	—	—	—		Non-album tracks
1967	"Good Goodness" b/w "You Never Know"	—	—	—	—	—	—	—		Non-album tracks
1967	"(I'm So) Glad You're My Baby" b/w "Stormy"	—	—	—	—	—	—	—		Non-album tracks
1968	"Hold Me Tight" b/w "Cupid"	5	7	21	20	5	1	4		Hold Me Tight
1968	"You Got Soul" b/w "Don't Cry"	58	55	46	—	6	37	72		Hold Me Tight
1969	"Lovey Dovey" b/w "You Got Soul"	130	—	—	—	—	—	—		Hold Me Tight
1969	"We Try Harder"* b/w "My Time"*	135	—	—	—	—	—	—		Johnny Nash & Kim Weston
1969	"Sweet Charity" b/w "People in Love" (from Hold Me Tight)	—	—	—	—	—	—	—		Non-album track
1969	"Love and Peace" b/w "People in Love" (from Hold Me Tight)	132	—	—	—	—	—	—		Love and Peace
1969	"Cupid" b/w "Hold Me Tight"	39	36	—	38	6	30	—		Hold Me Tight
1970	"(What A) Groovey Feeling" b/w "You Got Soul" – Part 1 (from Soul Folk)	102	131	—	—	—	—	—		Non-album tracks
1970	"Falling in and Out of Love" b/w "You Got to Change Your Ways" (from Hold Me Tight)	—	—	—	—	—	—	—		Non-album tracks
1972	"Stir It Up" b/w "Cream Puff"	—	11	—	6	13	7	48		I Can See Clearly Now
1972	"I Can See Clearly Now" b/w "How Good It Is"	1	1	38	1	5	1	3	BPI: Gold; RMNZ: Platinum	I Can See Clearly Now
1972	"There Are More Questions Than Answers" b/w "Guava Jelly"	—	—	—	—	9	—	—		I Can See Clearly Now
1973	"Stir It Up" b/w "Ooh Baby You've Been Good to Me"	12 (Note: Re-released in US after success of "I Can See Clearly Now".)	—	—	—	—	—	—		I Can See Clearly Now
1973	"My Merry-Go-Round" b/w "(Oh Jesus) We're Trying to Get Back to You"	77	74	—	34	—	47	—		My Merry-Go-Round
1973	"Ooh What a Feeling" b/w "Yellow House"	103	—	—	38	—	—	—		My Merry-Go-Round
1974	"Loving You" b/w "Gonna Open Up My Heart Again"	91	67	40	—	—	—	—		My Merry-Go-Round
1974	"You Can't Go Halfway" b/w "The Very First Time"	105	90	38	—	—	—	—		Celebrate Life
1974	"Celebrate Life" b/w "Beautiful Baby"	—	—	—	—	—	—	—		Celebrate Life
1975	"(You Gave Me Such) Good Vibrations" b/w "The Very First Time"	—	—	—	—	—	—	—		Celebrate Life
1975	"Tears on My Pillow" b/w "Beautiful Baby" (from Celebrate Life)	—	—	—	—	1	—	69	BPI: Silver	Tears on My Pillow (UK release only)
1975	"Let's Be Friends" b/w "The Edge of Love"	—	—	—	—	42	—	—		Tears on My Pillow (UK release only)
1976	"(What A) Wonderful World" b/w "Rock It Baby (Baby We've Got a Date)" (from Tears on My Pillow)	103	82	66	34	25	—	96		What a Wonderful World (UK release only)
1977	"That Woman" b/w "Back in Time"	—	—	—	—	—	—	—		What a Wonderful World (UK release only)
1979	"Closer" b/w "Mr. Sea"	—	—	74	—	—	—	—		Let's Go Dancing
1985	"Rock Me Baby" b/w "Love Theme from Rock Me Baby"	—	—	—	—	47	—	99		Here Again
1989	"I Can See Clearly Now" (remix); CD single with three other tracks	—	—	—	—	54	—	—		Non-album track
"—" denotes releases that did not chart or were not released in that territory.
