= List of number-one singles of 1993 (Spain) =

This is a list of the Spanish PROMUSICAE Top 20 Singles number-ones of 1993.

== Chart history ==
Issue date	Song	Artist
2 January	"Dur dur d'être bébé!"	Jordy
9 January	"Dur dur d'être bébé!"	Jordy
16 January	"Dur dur d'être bébé!"	Jordy
23 January	"Dur dur d'être bébé!"	Jordy
30 January	"Exterminate!"	Snap!
6 February	"Dur dur d'être bébé!"	Jordy
13 February	"Dur dur d'être bébé!"	Jordy
20 February	"I Will Always Love You"	Whitney Houston
27 February	"I Feel You"	Depeche Mode
6 March	"No Limit"	2 Unlimited
13 March	"No Limit"	2 Unlimited
20 March	"No Limit"	2 Unlimited
27 March	"I Feel You"	Depeche Mode
3 April	"I Feel You"	Depeche Mode
10 April	"I Feel You"	Depeche Mode
17 April	"I Feel You"	Depeche Mode
24 April	"I Feel You"	Depeche Mode
1 May	"I Feel You"	Depeche Mode
8 May	"Tribal Dance"	2 Unlimited
15 May	"All That She Wants"	Ace of Base
22 May	Encores	Dire Straits
29 May	"All That She Wants"	Ace of Base
5 June	"Nuestros Nombres"	Héroes del Silencio
12 June	Encores	Dire Straits
19 June	Encores	Dire Straits
26 June	Five Live (EP)	George Michael and Queen
3 July	Encores	Dire Straits
10 July	Encores	Dire Straits
17 July	Encores	Dire Straits
24 July	Encores	Dire Straits
31 July	Five Live (EP)	George Michael and Queen
7 August	"What Is Love"	Haddaway
14 August	Five Live (EP)	George Michael and Queen
21 August	Five Live (EP)	George Michael and Queen
28 August	"What Is Love"	Haddaway
4 September	"What Is Love"	Haddaway
11 September	"What Is Love"	Haddaway
18 September	"Life"	Haddaway
25 September	"El Gallinero"	Ramírez
2 October	"El Gallinero"	Ramírez
9 October	"El Gallinero"	Ramírez
16 October	"Living on My Own"	Freddie Mercury
23 October	"Living on My Own"	Freddie Mercury
30 October	"Living on My Own"	Freddie Mercury
6 November	"Boom! Shake the Room"	DJ Jazzy Jeff & The Fresh Prince
13 November	"Boom! Shake the Room"	DJ Jazzy Jeff & The Fresh Prince
20 November	"Boom! Shake the Room"	DJ Jazzy Jeff & The Fresh Prince
27 November	"Boom! Shake the Room"	DJ Jazzy Jeff & The Fresh Prince
4 December	"Boom! Shake the Room"	DJ Jazzy Jeff & The Fresh Prince
11 December	"Boom! Shake the Room"	DJ Jazzy Jeff & The Fresh Prince
18 December	"Boom! Shake the Room"	DJ Jazzy Jeff & The Fresh Prince
25 December	"Saturday Night"	Whigfield

== See also ==
- 1993 in music
- List of number-one hits (Spain)
