= Catch the Fire =

Catch the Fire may refer to

- Catch the Fire World, world-wide evangelical Christian church based in Toronto, Canada
- Catch the Fire Ministries, Australian organization founded by Danny Nalliah

== See also ==
- Catch a Fire (disambiguation)
- Catching Fire (disambiguation)
