= Janina Wissler =

German model, actress and TV host

Janina Mrosek
- Born: Janina Wissler; 18 November 1983 (age 42); Frankfurt am Main, Germany
- Occupations: Model, actress, TV host, graphic designer
- Years active: 2005–present
- Notable credit: Guru Josh Project: Infinity 2008
- Height: 163 cm (5 ft 4 in)
- Awards: Playboy Playmate of the Month for September 2005
- Website: www.janinamrosek.de

Janina Mrosek (born 18 November 1983 as Janina Wissler) is a German model, actress and TV host. She is known for her appearance in the 2008 music video for Guru Josh Project's song "Infinity 2008".

== Biography ==
She was born in Frankfurt am Main, in the German state of Hesse, and grew up in a small single-family home in Dreieich-Götzenhain. Wissler is a practicing Christian, a faith in which she was raised. Her mother is Renate Wissler.

Her modeling career began in 2005 when her best friend sent pictures of her to the German Playboy Magazine. She was invited to the shooting and was named the Playboy Playmate of September 2005. She was later Playmate of the Month for Playboy in 2006 and 2008.

In 2008, Wissler was featured in the popular music video of the Guru Josh Project song "Infinity", a nostalgic reissue of the electronic rave anthem by Jersey-based disk jockey Guru Josh, which was first released in 1989.

The accompanying music video shows clips of both Guru Josh, DJing a rave, and Wissler, dressed in a short sundress and high heals. Over the course of the approximately three-minute video, Wissler strips to her lingerie and dances inside what appears to be an abandoned warehouse, ultimately using a mallet to smash the television on which the scenes from Guru Josh's dance party are being shown.

According to The Guardian, the Guru Josh Project's 2008 release, remixed by German DJ Klaas Gerling, led to the track enjoying "a spectacular second life", reaching No. 1 in several European charts. Billboard reported that the song reached the No. 1 position on the Eurochart Hot 100 Singles chart on 11 June 2008, holding that position for several weeks.

The 2008 remix remains the Guru Josh Project's most streamed song, with Viberate Analytics reporting 2.7 million weekly streams in as of April 2026. Following both its release and re-release, "Infinity" achieved particular success in Germany, the United Kingdom, Portugal, the Netherlands, and Austria.

As of early 2026, the 2008 music video featuring Wissler, published on 21 June 2008 by WORLD CLUB DOME on video-sharing site YouTube, has been viewed more than 88 million times. A similar, higher-resolution video, released by Ultra Records on 21 February 2009, has received over 272 million views.

In 2009, Wissler also featured, alongside Guru Josh Project DJ Darren Bailie, in the music video for P.SIX's remix of "Infinity", "Let Me Know," where she is shown considering a "record deal" associated with P.SIX and "Infinity Rec". Over the course of the video, she undresses to reveal the same lingerie she wore during the 2008 music video, while ultimately picking up the telephone to accept the deal. The final scene shows Bailie celebrating with the record deal in his hand, implying that Wissler has agreed to the contract.

Over the course of her career, Wissler has worked with major German television companies, including public-service broadcaster ZDF and RTL Deutschland. She presented a weekly show called Games Report, a show that presented content related to computer and video gaming.

She has also appeared in two feature films, Zielgerade (2005) and Heroic Bloodshed (2008).

Although Wissler is a full-time model, she also works part-time as a graphic designer.
