= Rock My Heart =

1994 single by Haddaway

Single by Haddaway

from the album The Album
- Released: March 1994
- Genre: Eurodance; house; synth pop
- Length: 3:57
- Label: Coconut
- Songwriters: Dee Dee Halligan; Junior Torello
- Producers: Dee Dee Halligan; Junior Torello

Haddaway singles chronology
"I Miss You" (1993)	"Rock My Heart" (1994)	"Stir It Up" (1994)

Music video
- "Rock My Heart" on YouTube

"Rock My Heart" is a song by Trinidadian-German musician Haddaway, released in March 1994, by Coconut Records, as the fourth and final single from his debut album, The Album (1993). It was written and produced by Dee Dee Halligan and Junior Torello. Like the previous single "I Miss You", the song was a hit in several countries, particularly in the UK, Germany, Finland, Switzerland, Ireland and Belgium, where it reached the top 10. "Rock My Heart" shot into the Eurochart Hot 100 at number 17 on 9 April 1994 and peaked at seven four weeks later. Its accompanying music video, which was directed by Pete Cornish, features Haddaway in a desert-like setting, and received heavy rotation on European music television channels.

== Critical reception ==
AllMusic editor Jose F. Promis noted that "Rock My Heart" "shine just as brightly" as "What Is Love" and "Life". A reviewer from Billboard magazine deemed the song "among the most potent offerings" from the Haddaway-album. Pan-European magazine Music & Media wrote, "Escorted by his steady female background singers, Haddaway bounces like a pinball wizard on a synthesiser trampoline." Alan Jones from Music Week gave it a score of four out of five, saying, "This busy bounder is more akin to the happy house style of 'What Is Love' and 'Life', though with some Cappella-like synth phrases. As with all Haddaway songs, it's more contagious than the common cold."

Dele Fadele from NME felt it "is not a patch" on "What Is Love", remarking that the rhythm "sports some 2 Unlimited lifts", and concluding that "you get the feeling that he'll be around to bother you for a while yet." The Reading Evening Post called the song "effervescent", adding that it "should follow his others into the charts". They also wrote that "he undeniably has a way with this sort of repetitive Euro synth pop." James Hamilton from the Record Mirror Dance Update named it a "typically cheesy 130bpm Euro galloper" in his weekly dance column. In Finnish broadcaster Yle's "The ABC in Eurodance" in 2016, Antti Koivukangas said, "Of course, 'What is Love' is what comes to mind when you think about Haddaway's contribution to the Eurodance genre. You can't get over it, although I myself can't get over the fact that I think 'Rock My Heart' is a better song."

== Chart performance ==
"Rock My Heart" entered the top 10 in Belgium, Denmark, Finland, Germany, Ireland, Scotland, Switzerland and the United Kingdom. In the latter country, the single peaked at number nine on 10 April 1994, during its third week on the UK Singles Chart, spending two weeks at that position. On the Music Week Dance Singles chart, it reached number eight in the same period. Additionally, it was a top-20 hit in Austria, France, Iceland, the Netherlands, Spain and Sweden. In Italy, the song was a top 30 hit, peaking at number 21. On the Eurochart Hot 100, "Rock My Heart" climbed to number seven in May 1994, after having debuted as number 17 on the chart. In North America, it reached number seven on the Canadian RPM Dance/Urban chart and number 25 on the US Billboard Maxi-Singles Sales chart. The song also peaked at numbers 43 and 83 in New Zealand and Australia, respectively.

== Airplay ==
"Rock My Heart" entered the European airplay chart Border Breakers by Music & Media at number 16 on 26 March 1994 due to crossover airplay in West Central-, West-, North West- and South-Europe. It peaked at the third position on 23 April. In the United Kingdom, it reached number 10 on the UK Airplay chart in April 1994. In Europe, the song was best playlisted in the UK (60% penetration), followed by Belgium (50%) and Italy (40%). Germany, France, the Netherlands and Denmark showed less spectacular, but still significant figures (26-38%). It peaked at number 10 also on the European Hit Radio on 23 April 1994.

== Music video ==
The music video for "Rock My Heart" was directed by Pete Cornish and filmed in 3 Mills Island Studios in London. It features Haddaway in a desert-like setting along with backing singer Natascha Wright, who has also worked with DJ BoBo and La Bouche. She appears like a tall tree-like creature with her hair looking like twigs. In between, dancers painted in gold and silver performs. Haddaway also performs choreography with them in some scenes. The video received heavy rotation on MTV Europe and was A-listed on German music television channel VIVA in April 1994. Three months later, the video was A-listed on France's MCM in the end of July 1994.

== Track listings ==
- 7-inch single
1. "Rock My Heart" (radio mix) – 3:57
2. "Rock My Heart" (album mix) – 4:16
- 12-inch single
1. "Rock My Heart" (extended mix) – 5:58
2. "Rock My Heart" (radio mix) – 4:08
3. "Rock My Heart" (Celebration mix) – 5:48
4. "Rock My Heart" (Trime'N Delgado club mix) – 5:43
- CD single
1. "Rock My Heart" (radio mix) – 3:57
2. "Rock My Heart" (extended mix) – 5:55
- CD maxi
1. "Rock My Heart" (radio mix) – 3:57
2. "Rock My Heart" (extended mix) – 5:55
3. "Rock My Heart" (Celebration mix) – 5:58
4. "Rock My Heart" (Trime'n Delgado club mix) – 5:56

== Charts ==
=== Weekly charts ===
Chart (1994)	Peak position
Australia (ARIA)	83
Austria (Ö3 Austria Top 40)	12
Belgium (Ultratop 50 Flanders)	5
Canada Dance/Urban (RPM) with "Stir It Up"	7
Denmark (IFPI)	10
Europe (Eurochart Hot 100)	7
Europe (European Hit Radio)	10
Finland (Suomen virallinen lista)	4
France (SNEP)	11
Germany (GfK)	10
Iceland (Íslenski Listinn Topp 40)	13
Ireland (IRMA)	9
Israel (Israeli Singles Chart)	1
Italy (Musica e dischi)	21
Netherlands (Dutch Top 40)	12
Netherlands (Single Top 100)	17
New Zealand (Recorded Music NZ)	43
Scottish Singles Sales (Official Charts)	6
Spain (AFYVE)	11
Sweden (Sverigetopplistan)	17
Switzerland (Schweizer Hitparade)	10
UK Singles (Official Charts)	9
UK Airplay (Music Week)	10
UK Dance (Music Week)	8
UK Club Chart (Music Week)	18
US Maxi-Singles Sales (Billboard) with "Stir It Up"	25

=== Year-end charts ===
Chart (1994)	Position
Belgium (Ultratop 50 Flanders)	22
Europe (Eurochart Hot 100)	44
Germany (Media Control)	66
Israel (Israeli Singles Chart)	45
Netherlands (Dutch Top 40)	84
Sweden (Topplistan)	75
UK Singles (OCC)	88

== Release history ==
Region	Date	Format(s)	Label(s)	Ref.
Europe	March 1994	—N/a	Coconut	
United Kingdom	21 March 1994	7-inch vinyl; 12-inch vinyl; CD; cassette	Logic; Coconut	
Australia	27 June 1994	12-inch vinyl; CD; cassette	Coconut	
