= List of number-one singles of 1993 (Finland) =

This is the list of the number-one singles of the Finnish Singles Chart in 1993.

== Chart history ==
Issue date	Artist	Title
January 7	Klamydia	"Lahja"
January 21	Dingo	"Nahkatakkinen tyttö"
February 4	2 Unlimited	"No Limit"
February 18	Depeche Mode	"I Feel You"
March 4	Metallica	"Sad but True"
March 18	Haddaway	"What Is Love"
April 1	Kolmas Nainen	"Onpa kadulla mittaa"
April 15	Madonna	"Fever"
April 29	Snow	"Informer"
May 13	2 Unlimited	"Tribal Dance"
May 27	2 Unlimited	"Tribal Dance"
June 6	2 Unlimited	"Tribal Dance"
June 23	UB40	"I Can't Help Falling in Love (With You)"
July 9	UB40	"I Can't Help Falling in Love (With You)"
July 22	Culture Beat	"Mr. Vain"
August 5	Haddaway	"Life"
August 18	Culture Beat	"Mr. Vain"
September 2	DJ BoBo	"Keep on Dancing"
September 16	Culture Beat	"Got to Get It"
September 30	Pet Shop Boys	"Go West"
October 14	Frankie Goes to Hollywood	"Relax"
October 28	Cappella	"U Got 2 Let the Music"
November 11	Culture Beat	"Got to Get It"
November 25	Ace of Base	"The Sign"
December 9	2 Unlimited	"Maximum Overdrive"
December 23	Ace of Base	"The Sign"
