= Trompeta =

2022 single by Willy William

Single by Willy William
- Released: 18 February 2022
- Length: 2:48
- Label: Scorpio
- Songwriter(s): Willy William

Willy William singles chronology
| "Mambo" (2021) | "Trompeta" (2022) | "Solo" (2022) |

Music video
- "Trompeta" on YouTube

"Trompeta" is a song by French DJ, record producer and singer Willy William. It was released through Scorpio Music on 18 February 2022 as a single. The song samples the 1989 song "Infinity" by British DJ and producer Guru Josh.

== Charts ==
=== Weekly charts ===
Weekly chart performance for "Trompeta"
| Chart (2022) | Peak position |
|---|---|
| Belgium (Ultratop 50 Flanders) | 3 |
| Belgium (Ultratop 50 Wallonia) | 14 |
| Canada (Canadian Hot 100) | 60 |
| Canada AC (Billboard) | 29 |
| Canada CHR/Top 40 (Billboard) | 36 |
| Canada Hot AC (Billboard) | 46 |
| France (SNEP) | 28 |
| Hungary (Dance Top 40) | 32 |
| Netherlands (Dutch Top 40) | 3 |
| Netherlands (Single Top 100) | 11 |
| Poland (Dance Chart) | 4 |

=== Year-end charts ===
2022 year-end chart performance for "Trompeta"
| Chart (2022) | Position |
|---|---|
| Belgium (Ultratop 50 Flanders) | 19 |
| Belgium (Ultratop 50 Wallonia) | 61 |
| Netherlands (Dutch Top 40) | 5 |
| Netherlands (Single Top 100) | 41 |

== Certifications ==
Certifications for "Trompeta"
| Region | Certification | Certified units/sales |
|---|---|---|
| Canada (Music Canada) | Gold | 40,000^{‡} |
| France (SNEP) | Diamond | 333,333^{‡} |
| Netherlands (NVPI) | Platinum | 80,000^{‡} |
^{‡} Sales+streaming figures based on certification alone.
