= Syndrone =

Syndrone, as a stage name, may refer to:

- Travis Stewart, usually known as Machinedrum
- Paul Dudley Warren, usually known as Guru Josh
