= Stir It Up =

1967 single by Bob Marley & The Wailers

Single by Bob Marley and the Wailers
- B-side: "This Train"
- Released: 1967
- Genre: Rocksteady
- Length: 3:18 (original version); 5:32 (Catch a Fire version)
- Label: Trojan
- Songwriter: Bob Marley
- Producer: The Wailers

"Stir It Up"

Single by Johnny Nash

from the album I Can See Clearly Now
- B-side: "Cream Puff"
- Released: March 1972
- Genre: Rocksteady (proto-reggae)
- Length: 3:02
- Label: Epic
- Songwriter: Bob Marley
- Producer: Johnny Nash

Johnny Nash singles chronology
"Cupid" (1969)	"Stir It Up" (1972)	"I Can See Clearly Now" (1972)

"Stir It Up" is a song composed by Bob Marley in 1967 and first recorded by the group Bob Marley and the Wailers that year and issued as a single. It was later covered by American singer Johnny Nash on his 1972 album I Can See Clearly Now. The following year, Marley and the Wailers re-recorded the song for their album Catch a Fire.

The band performed "Stir It Up" on The Old Grey Whistle Test in 1973 during their first trip to the UK, singing live over a Chris Blackwell overdubbed backing track.

"Stir It Up" was the first Marley-written song to be successful outside Jamaica. Another tune written by Bob Marley, "I Shot the Sheriff", was covered by Eric Clapton on the album 461 Ocean Boulevard, July 1974. Marley's first international hit recorded by him, "No Woman, No Cry", was released on the Bob Marley and the Wailers album Live!, December 1975.

== Certifications (Bob Marley and the Wailers version) ==
Region	Certification	Certified units/sales
New Zealand (RMNZ)	2× Platinum	60,000^{‡}
United Kingdom (BPI)	Gold	400,000^{‡}
^{‡} Sales+streaming figures based on certification alone.

== Charts (Johnny Nash cover) ==
=== Weekly charts ===
Chart (1973)	Peak position
Australia (Kent Music Report)	48
Canada Top Singles (RPM)	7
Canada Adult Contemporary (RPM)	4
Ireland (IRMA)	13
UK Singles (OCC)	13
US Billboard Hot 100	12
US Adult Contemporary (Billboard)	6
US Cash Box Top 100	11

=== Year-end charts ===
Chart (1973)	Rank
Canada (RPM)	118
US Billboard Hot 100	91
US Cash Box Top 100	81

== The Black Sorrows version ==
"Stir It Up"

Single by the Black Sorrows

from the album The Chosen Ones – Greatest Hits
- Released: 11 October 1993
- Length: 3:34
- Label: CBS
- Songwriter: Bob Marley
- Producer: Joe Camilleri

The Black Sorrows singles chronology
"Sweet Inspiration" (1993)	"Stir It Up" (1993)	"Snake Skin Shoes" (1994)

In October 1993, Australian band the Black Sorrows released a version of the song. It became a hit, peaking at number 58 in Australia, number 20 in New Zealand (where it is the band's highest charting single), and number 9 in Iceland. At the ARIA Music Awards of 1994, Joe Camilleri was nominated for Producer of the Year for his work on this song, losing out to Tony Cohen.

=== Track listing ===
- CD single (Columbia 660 105-2)
1. "Stir It Up" – 3:34
2. "Ain't Love the Strangest Thing" (acoustic) – 4:10
3. "Come On, Come On" (acoustic) – 2:50

=== Charts ===
Chart (1993–1994)	Peak position
Australia (ARIA)	58
Iceland (Íslenski Listinn Topp 40)	9
Germany (GfK)	53
New Zealand (Recorded Music NZ)	20

== Haddaway version ==
"Stir It Up"

Single by Haddaway

from the album The Album
- Released: 1994
- Length: 4:16
- Label: Coconut; Arista
- Songwriter: Bob Marley
- Producers: Dee Dee Halligan; Junior Torello

Haddaway singles chronology
"Rock My Heart" (1994)	"Stir It Up" (1994)	"Fly Away" (1995)

In 1994, Trinidadian-German Eurodance artist Haddaway released his version of "Stir It Up" as the third single from his debut album, The Album (1993). It was only released in the US.

=== Critical reception ===
Troy J. Augusto from Cash Box wrote, "Hot new Arista singer (where have we heard that one before?) Haddaway looks to recover from the disappointment of last single, 'Life', with this solid cover of one of Bob Marley's most beloved songs. The cut's producers add a contemporary, almost techno-pop feel to the song (Marley's surely bumpin' in his grave!), but the tune's solid arrangement and Haddaway's likable voice translate to a crossover hit waiting to happen. Hit radio will stir it up soon."

=== Track listing ===
- 12", US (1994)
1. "Stir It Up" (Long Version) – 6:20
2. "Rock My Heart" (Extended Mix) – 5:58
3. "Rock My Heart" (Celebration Mix) – 5:48
- CD single, US (1994)
1. "Stir It Up" (Single Version) – 4:16
2. "Rock My Heart" (Extended Mix) – 5:58
3. "When the Feeling's Gone" – 4:15
- Cassette single, US (1994)
1. "Stir It Up" (Long Version)
2. "Stir It Up" (Single Version)
3. "Rock My Heart" (Extended Mix)

=== Charts ===
Chart (1994)	Peak position
Canada Dance/Urban (RPM) with "Rock My Heart"	7
Quebec (ADISQ)	13
US Hot Dance Music/Maxi-Singles Sales (Billboard) with "Rock My Heart"	25
