= Fly Away (Haddaway song) =

1995 single by Haddaway

Single by Haddaway

from the album The Drive
- Released: 30 April 1995
- Genre: Eurodance
- Length: 4:04
- Label: Ariola; Coconut
- Songwriters: Richard W. Palmer-James; Dee Dee Halligan; Junior Torello
- Producers: Dee Dee Halligan; Junior Torello

Haddaway singles chronology
| "Stir It Up" (1994) | "Fly Away" (1995) | "Catch a Fire" (1995) |

Music video
- "Fly Away" on YouTube

Alternative cover
- CD maxi - Remixes

"Fly Away" is a song by Trinidadian-German musician Haddaway, released on 30 April 1995, by Ariola and Coconut Records, as the lead single from his second album, The Drive (1995). It was written by Dee Dee Halligan, Richard W. Palmer-James and Junior Torello, and produced by Halligan and Torello. As with several of Haddaway's singles, another CD maxi was commercialized a few months after the first release. The song was a number-one hit in Finland and a top-10 hit in Denmark, Italy, Lithuania, the Netherlands and Switzerland. The accompanying music video for "Fly Away" features the singer in a prison cell.

== Critical reception ==
James Hamilton from British magazine Music Week's RM Dance Update described "Fly Away" as a "unhurried crooned Euro galloper". Paul Moody from NME said it "is the sort of tedious Euroslush you'd expect minus the existential angst that made 'What Is Love' so groovy."

== Chart performance ==
"Fly Away" peaked at number one in Finland and on the European Dance Radio Chart. It entered the top 10 in Denmark, Italy, Lithuania, the Netherlands and Switzerland. Additionally, the single was a top-20 hit in Austria, Flanders, Sweden and the United Kingdom, as well as on the Eurochart Hot 100, where it reached number 17 in May 1995. On the UK Singles Chart, "Fly Away" reached its highest position of number 20 during its first week on the chart, on 18 June 1995. It also peaked at number 25 on the UK Dance Singles Chart and number 13 on the Record Mirror UK on a Pop Tip Club Chart. Outside Europe, the song became a top-5 hit in Israel, peaking at number four on 16 May 1995. It spent 5 weeks inside the Israeli top 30.

== Music video ==
In the music video for "Fly Away", Haddaway appears sitting alone in a prison cell with a picture of a beach on the wall. He reads some lines in an old book, then the camera appears flying over a desert landscape. A naked Haddaway runs through this landscape, where he meets a white horse, smells some flowers and bathes in a waterfall. These dreamy outdoor scenes have a bluish tone. As he keeps running, he reaches a beach, where the waves crashes against the shore. It appears to be the same beach from the picture on the wall in his cell. "Fly Away" was B-listed on German music television channel VIVA in May 1995. The following month, MTV Europe put the video on break out rotation.

== Track listings ==
- CD single
1. "Fly Away" (radio edit) — 4:04
2. "Fly Away" (extended version) — 6:43
- CD maxi
1. "Fly Away" (radio edit) — 4:04
2. "Fly Away" (extended version) — 6:43
3. "Fly Away" (hyper space mix) — 6:23
4. "Fly Away" (maxi-flight-remix) — 5:25
5. "Fly Away" (development corporation mix) — 6:50
- CD maxi - Remixes
1. "Fly Away" (Tinman's mile high mix) — 6:11
2. "Fly Away" (Sequential One club house remix) — 5:00
3. "Fly Away" ("side by side" mix) — 6:08

== Charts ==
=== Weekly charts ===
| Chart (1995) | Peak position |
|---|---|
| Austria (Ö3 Austria Top 40) | 16 |
| Belgium (Ultratop 50 Flanders) | 15 |
| Belgium (Ultratop 50 Wallonia) | 29 |
| Denmark (IFPI) | 9 |
| Europe (Eurochart Hot 100) | 17 |
| Europe (European Dance Radio) | 1 |
| Europe (European Hit Radio) | 33 |
| Finland (Suomen virallinen lista) | 1 |
| France (SNEP) | 23 |
| Germany (GfK) | 25 |
| Ireland (IRMA) | 28 |
| Israel (Israeli Singles Chart) | 4 |
| Italy (Musica e dischi) | 5 |
| Italy Airplay (Music & Media) | 8 |
| Lithuania (M-1) | 10 |
| Netherlands (Dutch Top 40) | 9 |
| Netherlands (Single Top 100) | 10 |
| Scottish Singles Sales (Official Charts) | 18 |
| Sweden (Sverigetopplistan) | 14 |
| Switzerland (Schweizer Hitparade) | 9 |
| UK Singles (Official Charts) | 20 |
| UK Dance (OCC) | 25 |
| UK Pop Tip Club Chart (Music Week) | 13 |

=== Year-end charts ===
| Chart (1995) | Position |
|---|---|
| Latvia (Latvijas Top 50) | 179 |
| Netherlands (Dutch Top 40) | 95 |
| Switzerland (Schweizer Hitparade) | 52 |

== Release history ==
| Region | Date | Format(s) | Label(s) | Ref. |
|---|---|---|---|---|
| Europe | 30 April 1995 | 7-inch vinyl; CD | Ariola; Coconut | |
| Australia | 5 June 1995 | CD; cassette | Ariola; Coconut | |
| Japan | 21 July 1995 | CD | Ariola | |
