= Catch a Fire (song) =

Single by Haddaway

from the album The Drive
- Released: 31 July 1995
- Genre: Europop
- Length: 4:15
- Label: BMG; Ariola
- Songwriters: Richard W. Palmer-James; Dee Dee Halligan; Junior Torello
- Producers: Dee Dee Halligan; Junior Torello

Haddaway singles chronology
"Fly Away" (1995)	"Catch a Fire" (1995)	"Lover Be Thy Name" (1995)

Music video
- "Catch a Fire" on YouTube

"Catch a Fire" is a song by Trinidadian-German musician Haddaway, released on July 31, 1995 by BMG and Ariola as the second single from his second studio album, The Drive (1995). It is written by Dee Dee Halligan, Richard W. Palmer-James and Junior Torello, and produced by Halligan and Torello. The song was the last major Haddaway hit in several countries, particularly in Israel and Belgium (Flanders), where it reached the top 10. It also peaked at number 12 in Finland and number 17 in the Netherlands. On the Eurochart Hot 100, it reached number 43. For the first time, a Haddaway song was not released in France.

== Critical reception ==
AllMusic editor Jose F. Promis named "Catch a Fire" as a "fantastic, urgent, anthemic" song, adding that it "definitely deserved some form of exposure in the U.S.". James Masterton for Dotmusic described it as "a typically bouncy piece of Europop but not one it seems that is going to find chart success to match past hits such as 'What Is Love' and 'I Miss You'." A reviewer from Music Week rated it three out of five, writing that "Haddaway continues to make the pop game look easy with another manfully-sung sun 'n' surf stomper ripe for picking by Club Medders." James Hamilton from the magazine's RM Dance Update named it a "huskily crooned Euro canterer". Helen Lamont from Smash Hits was very negative, giving the single one out of five.

== Music video ==
A music video was produced to promote the single. It was later made available on YouTube in October 2012 in 4K and had generated more than one million views as of February 2024.

== Track listings ==
- CD single
1. "Catch a Fire" (Radio Edit) — 4:15
2. "Catch a Fire" (Extended Version) — 5:56
- CD maxi
1. "Catch a Fire" (Radio Edit) — 4:15
2. "Catch a Fire" (Extended Version) — 5:56
3. "Catch a Fire" (Catania's Maxi Version) — 5:36
4. "Catch a Fire" (House Mix) — 6:25

== Charts ==
=== Weekly charts ===
Chart (1995)	Peak position
Austria (Ö3 Austria Top 40)	30
Belgium (Ultratop 50 Flanders)	6
Belgium (Ultratop 50 Wallonia)	37
Europe (Eurochart Hot 100)	43
Finland (Suomen virallinen lista)	14
Germany (GfK)	38
Israel (Israeli Singles Chart)	4
Netherlands (Dutch Top 40)	17
Netherlands (Single Top 100)	23
Scotland (OCC)	39
Switzerland (Schweizer Hitparade)	20
UK Singles (OCC)	39

=== Year-end charts ===
Chart (1995)	Position
Belgium (Ultratop 50 Flanders)	71
Netherlands (Dutch Top 40)	145
