= Klaas (DJ) =

German DJ and record producer

- Born: Klaas Gerling; 3 January 1981 (age 45); Cologne, Germany
- Genres: House; electro house
- Occupations: DJ; record producer; remixer
- Years active: 2003–present
- Labels: Universal; Scream & Shout; Smash the House
- Website: www.klaas-music.de

Klaas Gerling (born 3 January 1981), simply known as Klaas, is a German DJ and record producer from Cologne.

Klaas worked under the label Scream & Shout. He has remixed songs for Dimitri Vegas and Like Mike (2016), DJ Antoine, Stromae, Armand Van Helden and Eric Morillo. He is best known for his remix of "Infinity" by Guru Josh, which topped the Belgian chart and peaked at number two on the Dutch chart in 2008. Producing "Infinity 2008" resulted in gold, silver and platinum records in a number of countries. His own release "Our Own Way" reached the top 10 in France in 2009.

As early as 2013, Klaas collaborated with Kim Petras (2023 Grammy-winning singer) on the songs "Heartbeat" and "Flight to Paris". Since 2016, Klaas has collaborated with Dimitri Vegas and Like Mike and Dimitri Vegas' wife MATTN to produce remakes of past club hits such as "Ocarina", "Cafe Del Mar", "Universal Nation" and Robert Miles' "Children" (2019). Klaas' 2018 single "OK Without You" achieved more than 40 million streams on Spotify. Another of his singles released in 2018, "Close to You", received more than 20 million streams. The collaboration with Londonbeat "I've Been Thinking About You" reached in spring 2019 #1 in the US Billboard Dance Charts. In 2021, Klaas has gained more than 5 million monthly listeners on Spotify. In January 2023, he reached the top 10 of Germany's most-streamed Dance/Electronic artists.

== Awards and nominations ==
Year	Award	Artist/work	Category	Result	Ref.
2023	Pop Awards	"First Girl on the Moon"	Song of the Year	Nominated	

== Discography ==
=== Charted singles ===
Title	Peak chart positions							
Title	GER	AUT	BEL	EUR	FRA	FRA Club	SWI	UK
"Infinity 2008"	4	3	1	1	1	1	1	3
"What Is Love 2K9"	60	37	41	3	5	2	49	—
"Our Own Way"	—	—	—	17	9	1	—	—
"Downtown"	—	—	—	4	—	18	—	—
"Freak"	—	—	—	14	—	—	—	—
"Café Del Mar 2016" (Dimitri Vegas & Like Mike and Klaas Edit) (by MATTN & Futuristic Polar Bears)	—	—	22	—	87	—	—	—
"—" denotes a recording that did not chart or was not released in that territory.

=== Other singles ===
2006

- Whipe Your Ass
- Get Twisted
- Confession

2007

- The Way

2008

- Sexy Girl
- How Does It Feel
- Make You Feel
- Feel the Love

2009

- What Is Love (with Haddaway)
- Our Own Way
- Better Days

2010

- Downtown
- It's My Day
- Freak (with Bodybangers)

2011

- I'm Free
- I Like (with Bodybangers)
- Changes

2012

- Do What You Do
- Grape
- Engelstrommeln
- Wild Beast
- Andromeda
- Pulsar
- Proton
- Hold This Moment

2013

- We Are Free
- Hurt Will End
- Flight To Paris (featuring Kim Petras)
- Storm
- Heartbeat (featuring Kim Petras)

2014

- Party Like We're Animals
- Calavera
- Ready
- Here We Go

2015

- Go For It
- Why
- Resurrection
- Gallery (We Are One)

2016

- Far Away (featuring Jelle Van Dael of Lasgo)
- Where You At
- Feel (feat. Steve Noble)
- Hungover By A Dream (feat. Lorela)

2017

- Riot
- Don't Talk
- Together
- Cintura

2018

- Close To You
- Love Your Life
- Big Words
- Get Down
- Ok Without You

2019

- Figure Out
- Klaas & Londonbeat - I've Been Thinking About You
- Don't Wanna Grow Up
- Someone Like You
- Children (With MATTN & Roland Clark)
- Call Me When You Need Me
- Over & Done
- When We Were Still Young

2021

- Take My Hand (with Freischwimmer, Sary)
- Godzilla
- Second Life
- Cross My Heart
- Hymn
- Cambodia
- Feel Only Love (Axmo Remix)
- Thank You And Good Night
- Already Gone
- Crazy Times
- Bad Girl (Klaas Edit)
- Clarity (Klaas Edit)
- Godzilla
- Wouldn't It Be Good
- Hereos
- Bang Bang (Klaas Remix)
- Cascada - One Last Dance (Klaas Remix)
- Feel Only Love
- Take My Hand
- Daylight
- Take Me Away (Klaas Remix)
- Klaas & Harris & Ford - Running
- Money (Mazza Remix)
- Sun Is Up
- No Superstar
- Can't Wait
- Hot N Cold
- Down (Klaas Remix)
- Tik Tik (Klaas Remix)
- How Far Can We Go (Averro Remix)
- Flashdance, What A Feeling
- Smalltown Boy (Klaas Mix)
- Ok Without You (Mazza Remix)

2022

- First Girl On The Moon
- Atlantis
- Fiesta Loca
- Dead Or Alive
- Shine A Light
- Godzilla (Mazza Edit)
- Lethal (Klaas Edit)
- Read My Mind
- Gravity
- Age of 27 (Klaas Remix)
- Elevator
- Chase
- Now Or Never
- Wishing Well
- Extasy
- Already Gone (Mazza Remix)
- Over The Rainbow
- Voyage Voyage
- Running (Averro Remix)
- Take Me Back
- Somebody To Love (With MATTN and Dino Worriors)
- Saltwater
- Mutual
- Zombie
- Ocean Eyes
- First Girl On The Moon (Rocco & Mazza Edit)
- One Two Step
- Take On Me
- 10011
- Heart Swipe
- Fantasy

2023

- Into The Goove
- A Place In The Dark (with GRY)
- Look Into My Eyes
- Friday On My Mind
- Dance On Jupiter
- Insomnia Eyes
- By The Lake
- The Logical Song (Dimitri Vegas & Like Mike Remix)
- Night Is Dark
- In My Head (Averro Remix)
- Das Boot
- Dreams (Will Come Alive) Klaas Remix
- Amaze Me
- I Got A Feeling
- Black Light
- Ghost
- Fade Into My Arms
- Tu Es Foutu
- Heart Swipe (Rocco & Mazza Edit(
- Fable
- Disconnected
- Colors
- Rapture
- Paradigm
- Over The Rainbow (Rocco & Mazza Remix)
- Wicked Game
- Braveheart

2024

- Weekend
- Paradise
- Fable (Shinzo & Rocco Remix)
- Mirage
- Fire
- Another Love
- Conquest Of Paradise
- Heroes (Shinzo & Rocco Remix)
- Drive It Like You Stole It
- Blame It On My Heart
- Nature's Law
- Neverending Story
- The Night We Met
- Second Live (Rocco & Michael Roman Remix)
- Clocks
- Adagio For Strings (Bulletproof)
- Parallel Lines
- Silence
- Rave On Mars
- Peaceful Place
- Voyage Voyage (Rocco & Michael Roman Remix)
- 7 Days
- The Only Drug I Need
- Popcorn (LA Night)
- I Promised Myself (Techno)
- Not Going Home
- Hot N Cold (Michael Roman & Rocco Remix)
- Tell Me How You Feel

2025

- Chewing Gum
- Such A Shame
- Crockett's Theme (Invincible)
- Win This Fight
- Golden Years
- Hymn (Michael Roman & Mazza Remix)
- Nothing Compares 2 You
- Legendary (Techno)

=== Remixes ===
- Chris Burke & Audiosonik - Bad Girl (Klaas Edit) 2021
- Dimitri Vegas & Like Mike vs. Quintino - The Chase (Klaas & MATTN remix) 2020
- Ulrikke - Attention (Ulrikke Brandstorp song) (Klaas remix) 2020
- Magnus - Do Not Cry (Klaas Remix) 2019
- Sean Finn X Guru Josh - Infinity 2018 (Klaas Remix) 2018
- No More Tears (Klaas Remix) 2018
- DJane Housekat - The One (Klaas Remix) 2017
- Sweet Dreams (Klaas Remix) 2017
- Dimitri Vegas, Mattn, Klaas, Futuristic Polar Bears - Universal Nation 2017
- Mazza feat. Tenashar – Found Love (Klaas Remix) 2017
- Martin Van Lectro – Never Know (Klaas Remix) 2016
- Newclaess – Feel Alive (Klaas Remix) 2016
- Mattn & Futuristic Polarbears – Cafe Del Mar 2016 (Dimitri Vegas & Like Mike vs Klaas Remix) 2016
- Mazza feat. Ariel Morer – Lift Me Up (Klaas Mix) 2016
- Silver Surfer (Klaas Remix) 2016
- Ocarina (Klaas & Mazza Remix) 2015
- Sean Finn – Explode (Klaas Mix Edit) 2015
- Mazza – Summer (Klaas Dub Mix) 2014
- Rene Rodrigezz & Dipl. Inch – Only One (Klaas Mix) 2013
- Van Snyder & DJ D.M.H - This World (Klaas Remix) 2013
- DJ Antoine – To the People (Klaas Remix) 2013
- R.I.O. – Ready or Not (Klaas Remix) 2013
- Alesha Dixon - Radio (Klaas Remix Feat. Wiley)
- Klaas & Bodybangers - I Like
- Lou Bega - This is Ska (Klaas Remix)
- Klaas & Bodybangers - Freak (Klaas Remix)
- Jessy Matador - Bomba (Klaas Mix)
- Jessy Matador - Bomba (Klaas Club Mix)
- Example - Kickstarts (Klaas Mix)
- Stromae - House'llelujah (Klaas Remix)
- Menyo - Follow Your Heart (Klaas remix)
- Jasper Forks - River Flows In You (Klaas Radio Mix)
- Safri Duo - Helele (Klaas Mix)
- Culcha Candela – Somma im Kiez (Klaas Remix)
- Real2Real – I Like To Move it (Klaas Remix)
- Greg Cerrone – Invincible (Klaas Remix)
- Attack Attack – Set The Sun (Klaas Remix)
- Michael Mind – Ride Like The Wind (Klaas Remix)
- Global Deejays – Everybody's Free (Klaas Remix)
- Antoine Clamaran & Mario Ochoa – Give Some Love (Klaas Remix)
- Micha Moor – Space (Klaas Club Mix)
- Micha Moor – Space (Klaas Bigrooom Mix)
- Eddie Thoneick – Together As One (Klaas Remix)
- Patrick Bryce – Papercut (Klaas & Micha moor Remix)
- Chrissi D! – Don't you feel (Klaas Remix)
- DJ Aston Martinez – You Wanna (Klaas Remix)
- Erik Decks – Wild Obsession Theme (Klaas Remix)
- DJ Shumilin - Roller Head (Klaas Remix)
- No Angels – Goodbye To Yesterday (Klaas Remix)
- DJ Antoine – This Time (Klaas Remix)
- Greg Cerrone – Pilling Me (Klaas Remix)
- John Morley – Naughty (Klaas Remix)
- I'm A Finn Vs Klaas – I Love You (Klaas Remix)
- The Freelance Hellraiser – Weightlessness (Klaas Remix)
- Lissat & Voltaxx – Young and beautiful (Klaas & Micha Moor Remix)
- Spinning Elements – Freak (Klaas Remix)
- Dr. Kucho & Gregor Salto – Can't Stop Playing
- Fragma – Memory (Klaas Remix)
- Danny S – Keep Me Hanging On (Klaas Remix)
- Jean Elan – Where's Your Head At (Klaas Remix)
- Guru Josh Project – Infinity 2008 (Klaas Remix)
- Gala - Freed From Desire 2011 (Klaas Club Mix)
- Mylène Farmer - Oui Mais... Non (Klaas Remix)
