= The Album (Haddaway album) =

Studio album by Haddaway
- Released: 13 September 1993
- Genre: Eurodance
- Length: 54:57
- Labels: Coconut; Arista
- Producers: Walter Bee; Haddaway; Dee Dee Halligan; Junior Torello; Alex Trime

Haddaway chronology
The Album (1993)	The Drive (1995)

Singles from The Album
- 1. "What Is Love" Released: 18 January 1993; 2. "Life" Released: 30 July 1993; 3. "I Miss You" Released: 22 November 1993; 4. "Rock My Heart" Released: 14 March 1994

Alternative cover
- US cover

Professional ratings
Review scores
Source	Rating
AllMusic	4/5 stars
Billboard	(favorable)
Encyclopedia of Popular Music	2/5 stars
Music Week	3/5 stars
Select	2/5 medals
Smash Hits	1/5 stars

The Album (also known as Haddaway in North America and L'Album in France) is the debut studio album by Trinidadian-German Eurodance recording artist Haddaway. It was released on 13 September 1993 through Coconut Records. It includes the hit singles "What Is Love", "Life", "I Miss You" and "Rock My Heart". The lead single, "What Is Love", was certified gold by the RIAA for sales of over 500,000 copies. In 2011, the album was released onto the iTunes Store by Razor & Tie.

== Critical reception ==
Alan Jones from Music Week wrote, "'Not a one-hit wonder' proclaimed the posters flagging Haddaway's second single 'Life', and they were right. Nor, on the evidence here, will he stop at two hits. His career-launching 'What Is Love' is the pick of the pack for sure, but there's enough upbeat and commercial house and hi-NRG here to ensure he has a run of hits. This type of album is, however, notoriously difficult to get away, as even his labelmates Snap have discovered."

== Track listing ==
The Album — standard version
No.	Title	Lyrics	Music	Producer(s)	Length
1.	"What Is Love"	Junior Torello	Dee Dee Halligan	Halligan; Torello	4:27
2.	"Shout"	Torello	Halligan	Halligan; Torello	4:33
3.	"Yeah"	Haddaway; Alex Trime	Haddaway; Trime	Halligan; Torello	3:41
4.	"Rock My Heart"	Torello	Halligan	Halligan; Torello	4:16
5.	"When the Feeling's Gone"	Haddaway	Halligan; Haddaway	Halligan; Torello	4:15
6.	"What Is Love" (Rapino Brothers mix)	Torello	Halligan	Halligan; Torello; The Rapino Brothers^{[a]}	3:48
7.	"Life"	Torello	Halligan	Halligan; Torello	4:18
8.	"Mama's House"	Haddaway; Trime	Haddaway; Trime	Halligan; Torello	4:03
9.	"Come Back (Love Has Got a Hold on Me)"	Torello	Halligan	Halligan; Torello	3:57
10.	"Sing About Love"	Haddaway	Haddaway; Trime; Walter Bee	Trime; Haddaway; Bee	4:40
11.	"I Miss You"	Torello; Clyde Lieberman	Halligan	Halligan; Torello	4:12
12.	"Life" (album re-mix)	Torello	Halligan	Halligan; Torello; Gary Jones^{[a]}; Trime^{[a]}	4:30

The Album — standard version with 2nd edition
No.	Title	Lyrics	Music	Producer(s)	Length
1.	"What Is Love" (Eat This mix)	Junior Torello	Dee Dee Halligan	Halligan; Torello	6:57
2.	"Life" (Mission Control mix)	Torello	Halligan	Halligan; Torello	7:03
3.	"Yeah"	Haddaway; Alex Trime	Haddaway; Trime	Halligan; Torello	3:41
4.	"Come Back (Love Has Got a Hold on Me)"	Torello	Halligan	Halligan; Torello	4:16
5.	"I Miss You" (club mix)	Torello; Clyde Lieberman	Halligan	Halligan; Torello	6:25
6.	"What Is Love" (Rapino Brothers mix)	Torello	Halligan	Halligan; Torello; The Rapino Brothers^{[a]}	3:48
7.	"Stir It Up"	Bob Marley	Marley	Halligan; Torello	4:45
8.	"When the Feeling's Gone"	Haddaway	Halligan; Haddaway	Halligan; Torello	4:15
9.	"Sing About Love"	Haddaway	Haddaway; Trime; Walter Bee	Trime; Haddaway; Bee	4:40
10.	"Mama's House"	Haddaway; Trime	Haddaway; Trime	Halligan; Torello	4:03
11.	"Rock My Heart" (Generic Heartbeat mix)	Torello	Halligan	Halligan; Torello	7:11
12.	"Tell Me Where It Hurts"	Diane Warren	Warren	Halligan; Torello	4:09
13.	"Shout"	Torello	Halligan	Halligan; Torello	4:33
14.	"Life" (Club Life)	Haddaway	Halligan; Haddaway	Halligan; Torello	6:13

The Album — 2nd edition with 12” Mix Versions
No.	Title	Lyrics	Music	Producer(s)	Length
1.	"What Is Love" (12" mix)	Junior Torello	Dee Dee Halligan	Halligan; Torello	6:41
2.	"Life" (12" Mix)	Torello	Halligan	Halligan; Torello	5:54
3.	"Yeah"	Haddaway; Alex Trime	Haddaway; Trime	Halligan; Torello	3:41
4.	"Come Back (Love Has Got a Hold on Me)"	Torello	Halligan	Halligan; Torello	4:16
5.	"I Miss You" (12" Mix)	Torello; Clyde Lieberman	Halligan	Halligan; Torello	5:18
6.	"What Is Love" (Rapino Brothers mix)	Torello	Halligan	Halligan; Torello; The Rapino Brothers^{[a]}	3:48
7.	"Stir It Up"	Bob Marley	Marley	Halligan; Torello	4:45
8.	"When the Feeling's Gone"	Haddaway	Halligan; Haddaway	Halligan; Torello	4:15
9.	"Sing About Love"	Haddaway	Haddaway; Trime; Walter Bee	Trime; Haddaway; Bee	4:40
10.	"Mama's House"	Haddaway; Trime	Haddaway; Trime	Halligan; Torello	4:03
11.	"Rock My Heart"	Torello	Halligan	Halligan; Torello	4:16
12.	"Tell Me Where It Hurts"	Diane Warren	Warren	Halligan; Torello	4:09
13.	"Shout"	Torello	Halligan	Halligan; Torello	4:33
14.	"Life" (album re-mix)	Haddaway	Halligan; Haddaway	Halligan; Torello; Gary Jones^{[a]}; Trime^{[a]}	4:44

Haddaway — North American version
No.	Title	Lyrics	Music	Producer(s)	Length
1.	"What Is Love"	Junior Torello	Dee Dee Halligan	Halligan; Torello	4:31
2.	"Life (Everybody Needs Somebody to Love)"	Torello	Halligan	Halligan; Torello	4:19
3.	"Yeah"	Haddaway; Alex Trime	Haddaway; Trime	Halligan; Torello	3:43
4.	"Come Back (Love Has Got a Hold on Me)"	Torello	Halligan	Halligan; Torello	4:01
5.	"I Miss You" (radio edit)	Torello; Clyde Lieberman	Halligan	Halligan; Torello	3:41
6.	"What Is Love" (Rapino Brothers mix)	Torello	Halligan	Halligan; Torello; The Rapino Brothers^{[a]}	3:50
7.	"Stir It Up"	Bob Marley	Marley	Halligan; Torello	4:25
8.	"Sing About Love"	Haddaway	Haddaway; Trime; Walter Bee	Trime; Haddaway; Bee	4:43
9.	"Mama's House"	Haddaway; Trime	Haddaway; Trime	Halligan; Torello	4:05
10.	"Rock My Heart"	Torello	Halligan	Halligan; Torello	4:20
11.	"Tell Me Where It Hurts"	Diane Warren	Warren	Halligan; Torello	4:12
12.	"Shout"	Torello	Halligan	Halligan; Torello	4:36
13.	"Life (Everybody Needs Somebody to Love)" (Mission Control mix)	Haddaway	Halligan; Haddaway	Halligan; Torello; Gary Jones^{[a]}; Trime^{[a]}	7:02

Notes

- ^{^[a]} signifies a remixer

== Personnel ==
- All songs arranged by Dee Dee Halligan and Alex Trime, except "Yeah" and "Mama's House" (arranged by Trime/Haddaway/Gary Jones) and "Sing About Love" (arranged by Trime/Haddaway)
- Produced by Dee Dee Halligan and Junior Torello, except "Sing About Love" (produced by Haddaway, Alex Trime and Walter Bee)
- Recorded and mixed by Gary Jones, except track 7 (mixed by Gary Jones and Henning McCoy)
- Track 6 remixed by The Rapino Brothers; track 12 remixed by Jones/Trime
- All songs on original recording published by A La Carte Music.
- Haddaway – lead vocals
- Lisa Noya – backing vocals on The Album, additional backing vocals on The Album 2nd Edition by Elkie Schlimbach, Rena T. Otta
- Alex Trime – keyboards

== Charts ==
=== Weekly charts ===
Chart (1993–94)	Peak position
Australian Albums (ARIA)	73
Austrian Albums (Ö3 Austria)	12
Canada Top Albums/CDs (RPM)	45
Dutch Albums (Album Top 100)	16
Finnish Albums (Suomen virallinen lista)	1
French Albums (SNEP)	17
German Albums (Offizielle Top 100)	5
Hungarian Albums (MAHASZ)	1
Norwegian Albums (VG-lista)	5
Scottish Albums (Official Charts)	15
Swedish Albums (Sverigetopplistan)	3
Swiss Albums (Schweizer Hitparade)	2
UK Albums (Official Charts)	9
US Billboard 200	111

=== Year-end charts ===
Chart (1993)	Position
German Albums (Offizielle Top 100)	64
Swiss Albums (Schweizer Hitparade)	29

Chart (1994)	Position
German Albums (Offizielle Top 100)	44
Swiss Albums (Schweizer Hitparade)	36

== Certifications and sales ==
Region	Certification	Certified units/sales
Austria (IFPI Austria)	Gold	25,000^{*}
Brazil (Pro-Música Brasil)	Gold	100,000^{*}
Canada (Music Canada)	Gold	50,000^{^}
Finland (Musiikkituottajat)	Gold	42,899
France (SNEP)	Gold	100,000^{*}
Germany (BVMI)	Platinum	500,000^{^}
Norway (IFPI Norway)	Gold	25,000^{*}
Sweden (GLF)	Gold	50,000^{^}
Switzerland (IFPI Switzerland)	Platinum	50,000^{^}
United Kingdom (BPI)	Gold	100,000^{^}
^{*} Sales figures based on certification alone.^{^} Shipments figures based on certification alone.
