= Coconut Records =

Coconut Records may refer to:

- Coconut Records, a musical project by Jason Schwartzman
- Coconut Records, a record label founded by Tony Hendrik
