= I Miss You (Haddaway song) =

1993 single by Haddaway

Single by Haddaway

from the album The Album
- Released: 22 November 1993
- Genre: Pop
- Length: 3:37 (radio edit); 4:12 (album mix)
- Label: Coconut
- Songwriters: Dee Dee Halligan; Junior Torello; Clyde Lieberman
- Producers: Dee Dee Halligan; Junior Torello

Haddaway singles chronology
| "Life" (1993) | "I Miss You" (1993) | "Rock My Heart" (1994) |

Music video
- "I Miss You" on YouTube

"I Miss You" is a song by Trinidadian-German musician Haddaway, released in November 1993 by Coconut Records as the third single from the musician's debut album, The Album (1993). Unlike his two previous hit singles, the song is a ballad. It was written by Dee Dee Halligan, Junior Torello and Clyde Lieberman, and produced by Halligan and Torello. A sizeable hit in several countries, particularly in the United Kingdom and Finland, it entered the top 10, reaching number nine and four, respectively. The single entered the Eurochart Hot 100 at number 87 on 11 December 1993 and peaked at number 10 on 19 February 1994. However, it did not reach the same level of success as "What Is Love" and "Life". By March 1994, worldwide sales had reached 300,000 units. The accompanying music video was filmed in Barcelona, Spain.

== Critical reception ==
American magazine Billboard named "I Miss You" "among the most potent offerings" from the album. A reviewer from Kingston Informer described it as a "commercial slice of pop from the dance floor master with a penchant for leather." In his weekly UK chart commentary, James Masterton wrote, "The new single is, as might be expected, a ballad but in actual fact is far better than the current crop of seasonal hits. It's gone in too slow to be a massive Christmas hit, but a good track nonetheless." Pan-European magazine Music & Media noted, "After two massive pop dance hits, this is another, more tender side of this year's biggest new male star. For this ballad he borrowed the sequencer hook out of Seal's 'Crazy'."

Alan Jones from Music Week commented, "An unexpectedly subtle record, with a slow and shuffling beat that draws a subdued but competent vocal from Haddaway. Repeated plays draw out its finer qualities." A reviewer from Reading Evening Post stated that "after two fast-paced dancefloor smashes, Haddaway makes a brave but mistaken move in slowing things down on this deeply ordinary bed foray". James Hamilton from the Record Mirror Dance Update viewed the song as a "mournful husky smoocher". Leesa Daniels from Smash Hits opined, "This is a slowie that has every love song cliché that's ever existed in lyrics and sounds uncannily like a Milli Vanilli hand-me-down tune."

== Chart performance ==
"I Miss You" entered the top 10 in Finland, Lithuania, and the United Kingdom, as well as on the Eurochart Hot 100, the European Adult Contemporary Radio chart and the European Hit Radio chart, reaching numbers 10, nine and seven, respectively. The single debuted on the Eurochart at number 87 on 11 December 1993, after charting in Belgium, Denmark, Finland and the Netherlands, and peaked nine weeks later. In the UK, the single peaked at number nine on 16 January 1994, during its fifth week on the UK Singles Chart. It entered the chart five weeks earlier at number 34 and stayed within the UK top 100 for 14 weeks.

Additionally, "I Miss You" was a top-20 hit in Austria, France, Germany, Ireland, the Netherlands and Switzerland. In Germany, it debuted on the Media Control chart at number 92, before peaking seven weeks later. The song spent 20 weeks inside the chart. In Africa, it was successful in Zimbabwe, peaking at number seven, while in Oceania, it reached number 44 on the ARIA Singles Chart in Australia. In West Asia, the song became a top-10 hit also in Israel, peaking at number seven in its second week on the chart, on 4 January 1994. It spent 5 weeks inside the Israeli top 30.

== Airplay ==
"I Miss You" entered the European Music & Media airplay chart Border Breakers at number 11 on 4 December 1993 due to crossover airplay in West Central-, East Central-, North- and South-Europe. It peaked at number two on 8 January 1994. In the UK, the song reached number three on the Music Week Airplay chart on 22 January.

== Music video ==
The music video for "I Miss You" was filmed in Park Güell in Barcelona, Spain. It received heavy rotation on MTV Europe and was A-listed on German music television channel VIVA in February 1994. It also was a Box Top on British The Box. Later, the video was made available in 4K version on Coconut Records' official YouTube channel in 2012, and had generated more than 16 million views as of late 2025.

== Track listings ==
- 12-inch single
1. "I Miss You" (club mix) — 5:20
2. "I Miss You" (12-inch mix) — 5:07
3. "Haddaway Mega Mix" — 5:37
4. "I Miss You" (radio edit) — 3:37
- CD single
1. "I Miss You" (radio edit) — 3:37
2. "I Miss You" (12-inch mix) — 5:07
- CD maxi
1. "I Miss You" (radio edit) — 3:37
2. "I Miss You" (12-inch mix) — 5:07
3. "I Miss You" (club mix) — 5:20
4. "I Miss You" (album mix) — 4:12

== Charts ==
=== Weekly charts ===
| Chart (1994) | Peak position |
|---|---|
| Australia (ARIA) | 44 |
| Austria (Ö3 Austria Top 40) | 11 |
| Belgium (Ultratop 50 Flanders) | 26 |
| Europe (Eurochart Hot 100) | 10 |
| Europe (European AC Radio) | 9 |
| Europe (European Hit Radio) | 7 |
| Finland (Suomen virallinen lista) | 4 |
| France (SNEP) | 16 |
| Germany (GfK) | 18 |
| Iceland (Íslenski Listinn Topp 40) | 25 |
| Ireland (IRMA) | 13 |
| Israel (Israeli Singles Chart) | 7 |
| Lithuania (M-1) | 5 |
| Netherlands (Dutch Top 40) | 21 |
| Netherlands (Single Top 100) | 17 |
| Sweden (Sverigetopplistan) | 36 |
| Switzerland (Schweizer Hitparade) | 17 |
| UK Singles (Official Charts) | 9 |
| UK Airplay (Music Week) | 3 |
| UK Club Chart (Music Week) | 50 |
| Zimbabwe (ZIMA) | 7 |

=== Year-end charts ===
| Chart (1994) | Position |
|---|---|
| Brazil (Mais Tocadas) | 30 |
| Europe (Eurochart Hot 100) | 52 |
| Germany (Media Control) | 81 |
| Netherlands (Dutch Top 40) | 168 |
| UK Singles (OCC) | 85 |
| UK Airplay (Music Week) | 35 |

== Release history ==
| Region | Date | Format(s) | Label(s) | Ref. |
|---|---|---|---|---|
| Europe | 22 November 1993 | 7-inch vinyl; CD | Coconut | |
| United Kingdom | 6 December 1993 | 7-inch vinyl; 12-inch vinyl; CD; cassette | Logic | |
| Australia | 22 August 1994 | CD; cassette | Coconut | |
