= Let's Do It Now =

Studio album by Haddaway
- Released: 28 December 1998
- Recorded: 1997–98
- Genres: Dance; electronic
- Length: 49:33
- Label: BMG 74321 50590 2
- Producers: Dee Dee Halligan; Junior Torello

Haddaway chronology
The Drive (1995)	Let's Do It Now (1998)	My Face (2001)

Professional ratings
Review scores
Source	Rating
Allmusic	3/5 stars

Let's Do It Now is the third album of dance artist Haddaway. The album, which includes the three singles "What About Me", "Who Do You Love", and "You're Taking My Heart", was released on December 28, 1998, by BMG.

== Track listing ==
1. "Let's Do It Now (Matrix Radio Edit)" (3:28)
2. "You're Taking My Heart (DJ Stevie Steve's Radio Edit)" (3:23)
3. "Touch" (4:33)
4. "Who Do You Love (Matrix Radio Edit)" (3:23)
5. "What About Me" (4:07)
6. "Satisfaction (Love Don't Come Easy)" (4:32)
7. "Make Me Believe" (4:36)
8. "I'll Do It for You" (4:41)
9. "Bring Back My Memories" (3:37)
10. "Don't Cut the Line" (3:50)
11. "I'll Wait for You" (4:15)
12. "Mr. President" (5:04)

== Credits ==
Producers: Dee Dee Halligan, Junior Torello
