= Infinity (Guru Josh album) =

Studio album by Guru Josh
- Released: 14 July 1990
- Recorded: 1989–90
- Genre: Acid house; electro dance
- Length: 43:56
- Label: BMG Victor Inc; Deconstruction
- Producer: Guru Josh

Infinity is the only album by English acid house musician Guru Josh. It was released in the UK in July 1990 by Deconstruction Records. The album features the single "Infinity" which was released in December 1989 and reached number five on the UK Singles Chart on 24 February 1990.

== Release ==
The album was released on vinyl, cassette and CD in July 1990 in the United Kingdom, Spain and Europe. It was later released in Japan on 21 September 1990 by BMG Victor Inc. On 19 June 2004, the album was re-released in the UK on CD by Sony Music with five exclusive bonus tracks.

== Critical reception ==
Professional ratings
Review scores
Source	Rating
Select	3/5

Trouser Press opined that "Infinity is a high-quality electro-dance record, full of lush melodies and warm instrumentals."

== Track listing ==
All tracks are written by Guru Josh, except as indicated.

No.	Title	Length
1.	"Warehouse Requiem"	1:08
2.	"Lift Up Your Arms"	4:45
3.	"Whose Law (Is It Anyway?)"	3:19
4.	"The Wanderer"	4:39
5.	"Power Force"	3:24
6.	"Popcorn" (Gershon Kingsley)	4:05
7.	"Infinity"	4:00
8.	"Move Your Body"	5:03
9.	"Crave It"	3:55
10.	"E-Minor Dim 7"	5:23
11.	"Louie Louie" (Richard Berry)	4:09
Total length:		43:56

Note

- Tracks 6 and 11 on CD versions only.

2004 re-release bonus tracks
No.	Title	Length
12.	"Infinity" (1990s Time for the Guru 12" mix)	7:30
13.	"Infinity" (Sane remix)	6:15
14.	"Whose Law (Is It Anyway?)" (12" version)	6:05
15.	"Whose Law (Is It Anyway?)" (Speedball mix)	5:49
16.	"Warehouse Requiem" (long version)	3:40
Total length:		73:17

== Charts ==
Chart (1990)	Peak position
Australian Albums Chart	80
Austrian Albums Chart	15
Dutch Albums Chart	79
German Albums Chart	23
Swiss Albums Chart	22
UK Albums Chart	41
