= Rigters =

Rigters is a Dutch/Surinamese surname. Notable people with the surname include:

- Delano Rigters (born 1956), Surinamese footballer
- Don Rigters (born 1992), Dutch basketball player
- Gregory Rigters (born 1985), Surinamese footballer
- Jamilhio Rigters (born 1999), Surinamese footballer
- Maceo Rigters (born 1984), Dutch footballer
