= Infinity (Guru Josh song) =

1989 song by Guru Josh

Single by Guru Josh

from the album Infinity
- Released: 18 December 1989
- Genre: Acid house
- Length: 4:00
- Label: Deconstruction
- Songwriter: Paul Walden
- Producer: Guru Josh

Guru Josh singles chronology
| "Infinity" (1989) | "Whose Law (Is It Anyway)" (1990) |

"Infinity", also known as "Infinity (1990's... Time for the Guru)", is a song by British acid house musician Guru Josh. It was originally released in December 1989 as the lead single from his debut album of the same name, so it was his debut single. The song was re-released in 2008 in a remixed version called "Infinity 2008", and once again in 2012 as "Infinity 2012".

== 1989 release ==
The song was first released in 1989 from the album of the same name. It achieved success in many European countries, such as Spain, Germany, the UK and Austria in 1989 and 1990, peaking at number five on the UK Singles Chart in March 1990, and has been featured on numerous dance compilations from 1990 to the present day. The song was sampled in the 2022 single "Trompeta" by Willy William.

=== Track listings ===
7-inch single

1. "Infinity" (1990s... Time for the Guru)
2. "Infinity" (Spacey Saxophone mix)

12-inch maxi

1. "Infinity" (1990s... Time for the Guru 12-inch mix) – 7:25
2. "Infinity" (Spacey Saxophone mix) – 4:03
3. "Infinity" (1990s... Time for the Guru 7-inch mix) – 4:00

=== Charts ===
==== Weekly charts ====
| Chart (1990) | Peak position |
|---|---|
| Australia (ARIA) | 4 |
| Austria (Ö3 Austria Top 40) | 5 |
| Belgium (Ultratop 50 Flanders) | 2 |
| Finland (Suomen virallinen lista) | 11 |
| Ireland (IRMA) | 8 |
| Netherlands (Dutch Top 40) | 3 |
| Netherlands (Single Top 100) | 3 |
| Norway (VG-lista) | 5 |
| Spain (AFYVE) | 1 |
| Switzerland (Schweizer Hitparade) | 4 |
| UK Singles (OCC) | 5 |
| West Germany (GfK) | 2 |

==== Year-end charts ====
| Chart (1990) | Position |
|---|---|
| Australia (ARIA) | 26 |
| Austria (Ö3 Austria Top 40) | 9 |
| Belgium (Ultratop) | 31 |
| Europe (Eurochart Hot 100) | 20 |
| Germany (Media Control) | 9 |
| Netherlands (Dutch Top 40) | 28 |
| Netherlands (Single Top 100) | 31 |
| Switzerland (Schweizer Hitparade) | 20 |
| UK Club Chart (Record Mirror) | 97 |

==== Decade-end charts ====
| Chart (1990–1999) | Rank |
|---|---|
| Austria (Ö3 Austria Top 40) | 56 |

=== Certifications ===
| Region | Certification | Certified units/sales |
|---|---|---|
| Australia (ARIA) | Platinum | 70,000^{^} |
| Germany (BVMI) | Gold | 250,000^{^} |
^{*} Sales figures based on certification alone.^{^} Shipments figures based on certification alone.

== DJ Taucher version ==
"Infinity"

Single by DJ Taucher
- Released: 21 May 1995
- Length: 4:18
- Label: Dance Pool
- Songwriter: Paul Walden
- Producers: Torsten Stenzel; DJ Taucher

DJ Taucher singles chronology
| "Fantasy" (1994) | "Infinity" (1995) | "Miracle" (1996) |

DJ Taucher released a heavier techno version of the song in 1995. This version is not to be found on any of his studio albums, but is included on the compilation albums Dance Now! 10 and Maxi Dance Sensation 18.

=== Track listings ===
CD maxi

1. "Infinity (Phase I)" – 4:18
2. "Infinity (Phase II)" – 7:35
3. "Infinity (Phase III)" – 5:30
4. "Mental Thing (Phase IV)" – 6:34

=== Charts ===
| Chart (1995) | Peak Position |
|---|---|
| Germany (GfK) | 50 |
| Switzerland (Schweizer Hitparade) | 45 |

== Infinity 2008 ==
"Infinity 2008"

Single by Guru Josh Project
- B-side: "Remix"
- Released: 8 August 2008
- Length: 3:12
- Label: Ministry of Sound; Ultra
- Songwriter: Paul Walden
- Producers: Klaas Gerling; Jerome Isme-Ae

Guru Josh Project singles chronology
| "Infinity 2008" (2008) | "Crying in the Rain" (2009) |

In 2007, the 'Guru Josh Project' was formed, and included Guru Josh, Snakebyte and the man that inspired the project, Darren Bailie. The 'Guru Josh Project's' adaptation of "Infinity" became another hit in 2008 and 2009 as a remixed version by DJ Klaas, under the title "Infinity 2008". The release enjoyed much success, reaching number one in France, Belgium, Denmark, Poland, Hungary and on the Eurochart Hot 100, and reached number two on the German dance chart. It peaked at number three on the UK Singles Chart, bettering the performance of the original single by 2. The remix was written by Paul Walden and produced by Klaas Gerling and Jerome Isma-Ae. It was published by EMI Music.

In April 2009, the track was picked up by Ultra Music in the United States and debuted on the Billboard Hot Dance Airplay chart, where it reached the number one spot, dethroning Lady Gaga's "Poker Face", in May 2009.

In France, the song was included on the double compilation NRJ Music Awards 2009. The video features German playmate Janina Wissler (Playboy's Girl of September 2005) and Josh.

In Germany, the song was released under Kontor Records.

The song was sampled in the 2021 single "Feel Your Love" by Belgian-Greek DJ duo Dimitri Vegas & Like Mike, Australian DJ Timmy Trumpet and Romanian DJ Edward Maya.

=== Track listings ===
CD single

1. "Infinity 2008" (Klaas vocal edit) – 3:12
2. "Infinity 2008" (Klaas remix) – 6:29
3. "Infinity 2008" (Jerome Isma-ae remix) – 7:33

CD maxi

1. "Infinity 2008" (Klaas remix) – 6:29
2. "Infinity 2008" (Jerome Isma-ae remix) – 7:30
3. "Infinity 2008" (Steen Thottrup Chill mix) – 6:02
4. "Infinity 2008" (Klaas vocal edit) – 3:12

12-inch maxi

1. "Infinity 2008" (Klaas remix) – 6:29
2. "Infinity 2008" (Jerôme Isma-ae remix) – 7:31

CD maxi – Remixes

1. "Infinity 2008" (Klaas vocal edit) – 3:12
2. "Infinity 2008" (commercial radio edit) – 4:25
3. "Infinity 2008" (Klaas vocal mix) – 4:54
4. "Infinity 2008" (Klaas remix) – 6:29
5. "Infinity 2008" (Jerôme Isma-ae remix) – 7:32
6. "Infinity 2008" (Yvan and Dan Daniel remix) – 6:50
7. "Infinity 2008" (Magic Mitch club mix) – 5:54
8. "Infinity 2008" (Steen Thottrup Chill mix) – 6:00

=== Charts ===
==== Weekly charts ====
| Chart (2008–2010) | Peak position |
|---|---|
| Austria (Ö3 Austria Top 40) | 3 |
| Belgium (Ultratop 50 Flanders) | 1 |
| Belgium (Ultratop 50 Wallonia) | 2 |
| Canada (Canadian Hot 100) | 35 |
| CIS Airplay (TopHit) | 1 |
| Czech Republic Airplay (ČNS IFPI) | 1 |
| Denmark (Tracklisten) | 1 |
| Europe (Eurochart Hot 100) | 1 |
| Finland (Suomen virallinen lista) | 6 |
| France (SNEP) | 1 |
| Germany (GfK) | 4 |
| Hungary (Dance Top 40) | 1 |
| Hungary (Rádiós Top 40) | 39 |
| Ireland (IRMA) | 10 |
| Israel (Media Forest) | 1 |
| Italy (FIMI) | 20 |
| Netherlands (Dutch Top 40) | 2 |
| Netherlands (Single Top 100) | 1 |
| New Zealand (Recorded Music NZ) | 11 |
| Norway (VG-lista) | 3 |
| Poland (Polish Airplay Charts) | 1 |
| Russia Airplay (TopHit) | 1 |
| Slovakia Airplay (ČNS IFPI) | 21 |
| Spain (Promusicae) | 2 |
| Sweden (Sverigetopplistan) | 8 |
| Switzerland (Schweizer Hitparade) | 2 |
| Ukraine Airplay (TopHit) | 8 |
| UK Singles (Official Charts) | 3 |
| UK Dance (Official Charts) | 2 |
| UK Indie (Official Charts) | 1 |
| US Hot Latin Songs (Billboard) | 42 |
| US Dance/Mix Show Airplay (Billboard) | 1 |

==== Year-end charts ====
| Chart (2008) | Position |
|---|---|
| Austria (Ö3 Austria Top 40) | 28 |
| Belgium (Ultratop 50 Flanders) | 11 |
| Belgium (Ultratop 50 Wallonia) | 37 |
| CIS Airplay (TopHit) | 55 |
| Europe (Eurochart Hot 100) | 21 |
| France (SNEP) | 18 |
| Germany (Media Control) | 17 |
| Netherlands (Dutch Top 40) | 10 |
| Netherlands (Single Top 100) | 14 |
| Russia Airplay (TopHit) | 48 |
| Sweden (Sverigetopplistan) | 37 |
| Switzerland (Schweizer Hitparade) | 30 |
| UK Singles (OCC) | 41 |

| Chart (2009) | Position |
|---|---|
| Austria (Ö3 Austria Top 40) | 31 |
| Belgium (Ultratop 50 Flanders) | 41 |
| Belgium (Ultratop 50 Wallonia) | 44 |
| CIS Airplay (TopHit) | 8 |
| Europe (Eurochart Hot 100) | 5 |
| France (SNEP) | 34 |
| Germany (Media Control) | 30 |
| Hungary (Dance Top 40) | 17 |
| Hungary (Rádiós Top 40) | 172 |
| Italy (FIMI) | 54 |
| Russia Airplay (TopHit) | 8 |
| Spain (Promusicae) | 2 |
| Sweden (Sverigetopplistan) | 75 |
| Switzerland (Schweizer Hitparade) | 8 |
| Ukraine Airplay (TopHit) | 37 |
| UK Singles (OCC) | 130 |
| US Hot Dance Airplay (Billboard) | 5 |

==== Decade-end charts ====
| Chart (2000–2009) | Position |
|---|---|
| CIS Airplay (TopHit) | 5 |
| Russia Airplay (TopHit) | 5 |

=== Certifications ===
| Region | Certification | Certified units/sales |
|---|---|---|
| Belgium (BRMA) | Gold | |
| Canada (Music Canada) | Platinum | 80,000^{‡} |
| Denmark (IFPI Danmark) | 2× Platinum | 30,000^{^} |
| Germany (BVMI) | Gold | 150,000^{^} |
| Italy (FIMI) | Platinum | 100,000^{‡} |
| Netherlands (NVPI) | Platinum | 50,000^{^} |
| New Zealand (RMNZ) | Platinum | 15,000^{*} |
| Norway (IFPI Norway) | Platinum | 10,000^{*} |
| Sweden (GLF) | Gold | 10,000^{^} |
| Spain (Promusicae) | 4× Platinum | 100,000^{*} |
| United Kingdom (BPI) | Platinum | 600,000^{‡} |
^{*} Sales figures based on certification alone.^{^} Shipments figures based on certification alone.^{‡} Sales+streaming figures based on certification alone.

== Infinity 2012 ==
"Infinity 2012"

Single by Guru Josh
- Released: 14 May 2012
- Genre: House
- Length: 3:25
- Label: BigCityBeats
- Songwriter: Paul Walden
- Producer: Guru Josh

Guru Josh singles chronology
| "Love of Life" (2011) | "Infinity 2012" (2012) |

The song was again remixed in 2012 by Swiss producers Antoine Konrad and Fabio Antoniali under the name "DJ Antoine vs. Mad Mark". It was released digitally in Austria, Germany, and Switzerland on 14 May 2012.

In June 2012, Unilever selected "Infinity 2012" as the soundtrack to the advertisement for the Magnum Infinity ice cream.

=== Music video ===
The music video premiered on MTV on 15 June 2012, and was first broadcast on Yahoo! Music on 20 August 2012.

The music video was filmed in an underground parking lot of a large city probably in the United States, according to the double graduation of the thermometer in degrees Celsius and Fahrenheit appearing several times in the clip.

The clip shows two young women dancing lasciviously and swaying around their respective vehicles, including a Ford Mustang as a police vehicle. One of them is German glamour model and playmate Jennifer Martin who plays the role of a policewoman who arrested the other. They then seduce each other while partially undressing, thus contributing to making the atmosphere in the parking lot "torrid", which triggers a fire alarm which sprays water on the two dancers. Throughout the clip, a young black man in glasses and a hat observes the scene from behind his Volkswagen Beetle and believes he is dancing with them in what seems to him to be a dream...

As of January 2024, the music video for "Infinity 2012" has been viewed over 12 million times on popular video-sharing website, YouTube.

=== Track listing ===
- CD single
1. "Infinity 2012" (DJ Antoine vs. Mad Mark Radio Edit) – 3:25
2. "Infinity 2012" (DJ Antoine vs. Mad Mark Remix) – 6:56
- Digital download
1. "Infinity 2012" (DJ Antoine vs. Mad Mark Radio Edit) – 3:25
2. "Infinity 2012" (DJ Antoine vs. Mad Mark Remix) – 6:56
3. "Infinity 2012" (Robbie Rivera Juicy Remix) – 6:30
4. "Infinity 2012" (Loverush UK! Remix) – 6:48
5. "Infinity 2012" (PunX Soundcheck Dubstep Remix) – 5:42

=== Credits and personnel ===
- Paul Walden – songwriter, composer, producer
- Antoine Konrad – additional production (DJ Antoine vs. Mad Mark version)
- Fabio Antoniali – additional production (DJ Antoine vs. Mad Mark version)
- Hal Ritson – vocal production, saxophone production
- Daniel Pearce – vocals
- Ben Castle – saxophone

Credits adapted from "Infinity 2012" CD single liner notes.

=== Charts ===
| Chart (2012) | Peak position |
|---|---|
| Austria (Ö3 Austria Top 40) | 10 |
| Germany (GfK) | 14 |
| Switzerland (Schweizer Hitparade) | 16 |

=== Year-end charts ===
| Chart (2012) | Position |
|---|---|
| Germany (Official German Charts) | 98 |

=== Certifications ===
| Region | Certification | Certified units/sales |
|---|---|---|
| Italy (FIMI) | Gold | 15,000^{*} |
^{*} Sales figures based on certification alone.
