= Catch a Fire (disambiguation) =

Catch a Fire is a 1973 album by Bob Marley and the Wailers.

Catch a Fire may also refer to:

- Catch a Fire (film), by Phillip Noyce (2006)
- Catch a Fire (That Petrol Emotion EP) (1993)
- "Catch a Fire" (song), a song by Haddaway

== See also ==
- Katchafire, a New Zealand roots reggae band
- Catching Fire (disambiguation)
