= Chyp-Notic =

German Eurodance group

- Origin: Cologne, Germany
- Genres: Eurodance
- Years active: 1988–1994
- Labels: Coconut, BMG
- Past members: Vlad Mint; Jan Erik; Walter Bee

Chyp-Notic were a German Eurodance group formed in 1988, who had several hits between 1990 and 1993, including a cover of "Nothing Compares 2 U" and "I Can't Get Enough".

== History ==
They released their first and best-known single "Nothing Compares 2 U" in 1990. This uptempo cover of Sinéad O'Connor's cover of the Prince song reached #16 on the German singles chart. The beat is lifted from the Raze song "Break 4 Love". After two albums and several successes, including a top 20 placing for the third single "I Can't Get Enough" in 1991, the band broke up in 1994.

== Discography ==
=== Albums ===
- 1990: Nothing Compares
- 1992: I Can't Get Enough

Compilations

- 2008: Greatest Hits
- 2015: 25

=== Singles ===
Year	Single	Peak chart positions				Album
Year	Single	GER	AUT	BEL (FLA)	NZ	Album
1990	"Nothing Compares 2U (The Ultimate Dance-Version)"	16	9	21	18	Nothing Compares
1990	"If I Can't Have You"	—	—	—	—	Nothing Compares
1992	"I Can't Get Enough"	14	—	—	—	I Can't Get Enough
1992	"Still in Love with You"	71	30	—	—	I Can't Get Enough
1992	"I Do It All for You, Baby"	89	—	—	—	Singles only
1993	"When I Dream"	77	—	—	—	Singles only
1994	"Don't Break the Heart" (feat. Greg Ellis)	—	—	—	—	Singles only
1999	"In the Mix"	—	—	—	—	Singles only
2015	"Nothing Compares 2U (2015 Remixes)"	—	—	—	—	
"—" denotes releases that did not chart or were not released.
