= The Drive (album) =

Studio album by Haddaway
- Released: 26 June 1995
- Recorded: 1994–95
- Genre: Eurodance
- Length: 51:07
- Label: Arista; Coconut
- Producer: Dee Dee Halligan; Junior Torello; Desmond Child; Haddaway; Alex Trime

Haddaway chronology
The Album (1993)	The Drive (1995)	Let's Do It Now (1998)

Singles from The Drive
- 1. "Fly Away" Released: 29 May 1995; 2. "Catch a Fire" Released: 31 July 1995; 3. "Lover Be Thy Name" Released: 6 August 1995

Professional ratings
Review scores
Source	Rating
AllMusic	3/5 stars
Encyclopedia of Popular Music	2/5 stars

The Drive is the second album of dance artist Haddaway, which includes the three singles "Fly Away", "Catch a Fire" and "Lover Be Thy Name".

The album was released in many European countries on June 26, 1995. Although it met with success, this album obtained less extraordinary runnings in the various charts than those of the previous album, The Album. It managed, however, to reach #10 in Switzerland.

== Track listing ==
1. "Fly Away" (4:04)
2. "I Know" (4:32)
3. "Breakaway" (4:39)
4. "Lover Be Thy Name" (3:47)
5. "Waiting For a Better World" (4:25)
6. "Give It Up" (4:15)
7. "Catch a Fire" (4:15)
8. "Desert Prayer" (5:50)
9. "The First Cut Is the Deepest" (4:27)
10. "Baby Don't Go" (3:56)
11. "Freedom Is" (4:14)
12. "Another Day Without You" (4:43)

== Credits ==
- Executive producer – Dee Dee Halligan, Junior Torello
- Photography by – Helge Strauß, Hester Doove
- Producer – Alex Trime (tracks: 3), Halligan (tracks: 1, 2, 5, 7, 9, 10, 12), Desmond Child (tracks: 4, 8), Haddaway (tracks: 3, 4, 6, 8, 11), Torello (tracks: 1, 2, 5, 7, 9, 10, 12)

== Charts ==
Chart (1995)	Peak position
Austrian Albums (Ö3 Austria)	27
Dutch Albums (Album Top 100)	54
Finnish Albums (Suomen virallinen lista)	13
German Albums (GfK)	32
Hungarian Albums (MAHASZ)	17
Swiss Albums (Schweizer Hitparade)	10
