= Tenashar =

Singaporean DJ and model (born 1985 or 1986)

- Born: Debbie Valerie Long; 1985 or 1986 (age 40–41); Singapore
- Occupations: DJ, model
- Years active: 2009–2018
- Agent: Seizmic
- Criminal charges: 2 counts of drug consumption in 2015, 19 counts including drug charges, forgery, impersonation and forgery in 2019 and 2021
- Criminal penalty: 18 months' imprisonment from 26 March 2018, 74 days in 2019, 18 months' imprisonment from March 2021
- Criminal status: Released
- Partner: Thorsten Nolte (2015–2018)
- Children: 1 daughter
- Musical career
- Also known as: Tenashar
- Genres: Progressive house; Electro house; Big room house
- Instrument: DJ mixer
- Years active: 2009–2018
- Website: tenashar.com

Debbie Valerie Long (born 1985 or 1986), better known by her stage name Tenashar, is a former Singaporean DJ and model.

== Background ==
Born in Singapore, Long worked as a financial broker before becoming an amateur DJ at Singapore's Avalon nightclub in 2009 and at Emboga in Madrid, Spain in 2011. She later returned to Avalon to become its resident DJ.

She was featured in Playboy Thailand magazine in October 2013. She was also the first Singaporean DJ to be ranked among the world's top 100 DJs in DJ Mag's Top 100 DJs poll in 2013, coming in at #87.

She signed a deal with Universal Music in 2015; her first single "Traffic" was released in June of that year.

== Personal life ==
During her time as a financial broker, Long was married and had a daughter who was born around 2007. She has since divorced and her daughter stays with her ex-husband.

In February 2015, Long met the 42-year-old British expat Thorsten Nolte through a mutual friend. Prior to their first meeting, Nolte had divorced his wife Jamie Yeo that same month.

In October 2015, upon their return to Singapore from the Amsterdam trip, Long and Nolte were arrested on suspicion of drug offenses; Long's luggage was searched and was found to have two "Psilocybe Atlantis Forbidden Fruit" containers holding about 41.81 grams of magic truffles, which contain psilocin, a controlled drug in Singapore. She also tested positive for benzoylecgonine, an indicator of cocaine, in a urine test, while Nolte was tested positive for cannabis. Their apartment at Robertson Quay was later raided and tablets of nimetazepam were found there.

They were later released on bail; however, they left Singapore while their charges were still pending, resulting in their failure to report to the Central Narcotics Bureau, and both ended up becoming wanted people. When contacted by The New Paper through an email a year later on 1 April 2016, Long denied that they were in trouble with the law and stated that the allegations were made to "stir some gossip and slander" them. The news that they were on the run was first made known in the said newspaper the following day.

Long returned to Singapore due to the expiration of her passport; she was arrested upon arrival at Changi Airport on 24 May 2018 and was held on remand, while her ex-boyfriend remained in Germany. On 26 March 2018, Long was found guilty in court and was sentenced to 18 months' imprisonment. She was released at the end of May 2019.

Now 35, Long received early release from prison in 2019. She was subjected to a remission order under which she was supposed to stay out of trouble from May 29 to Nov 25, 2019.

But she reoffended during that period and repeatedly failed to report for a urine test for drug use. Resulting in an additional 72 days behind bars.

On April 5, 2021, she was charged with 19 charges and was convicted of nine charges, including several drug-related ones. Resulting in another 18 month sentence. Ten other charges, including for theft and harassment, were considered during sentencing.

In April 2022 she filed a forged document using the Attorney General's name, however, in November 2024 she was acquitted of the forgery charge as she was found to be of unsound mind at the time. As she was acting under a delusion that she was working for the Internal Security Department (ISD) at the time. She has been assessed by the Institute of Mental Health (IMH) to be suffering from an unspecified type of delusional disorder.

== Discography ==
=== Singles ===
- "B.O.P. (Bird of Prey)"
- "Traffic"
- "Jump"
- "Scream & Shout"
- "Put Them Up"
- "Fusion"
- "Danceway"
