= Catching Fire (disambiguation) =

Catching Fire is a 2009 novel by Suzanne Collins.

Catching Fire may also refer to:

- The Hunger Games: Catching Fire, a 2013 film sequel to The Hunger Games and adaptation of the novel
- Catching Fire: How Cooking Made Us Human, a 2009 book by Richard Wrangham
- Catching Fire: The Story of Anita Pallenberg, a 2024 documentary film
- Catching Fire, a 1982 novel by Kay Nolte Smith

== See also ==
- Combustion
- Catch a Fire (disambiguation)
