= Haddaway =

Trinidadian-German singer (born 1965)

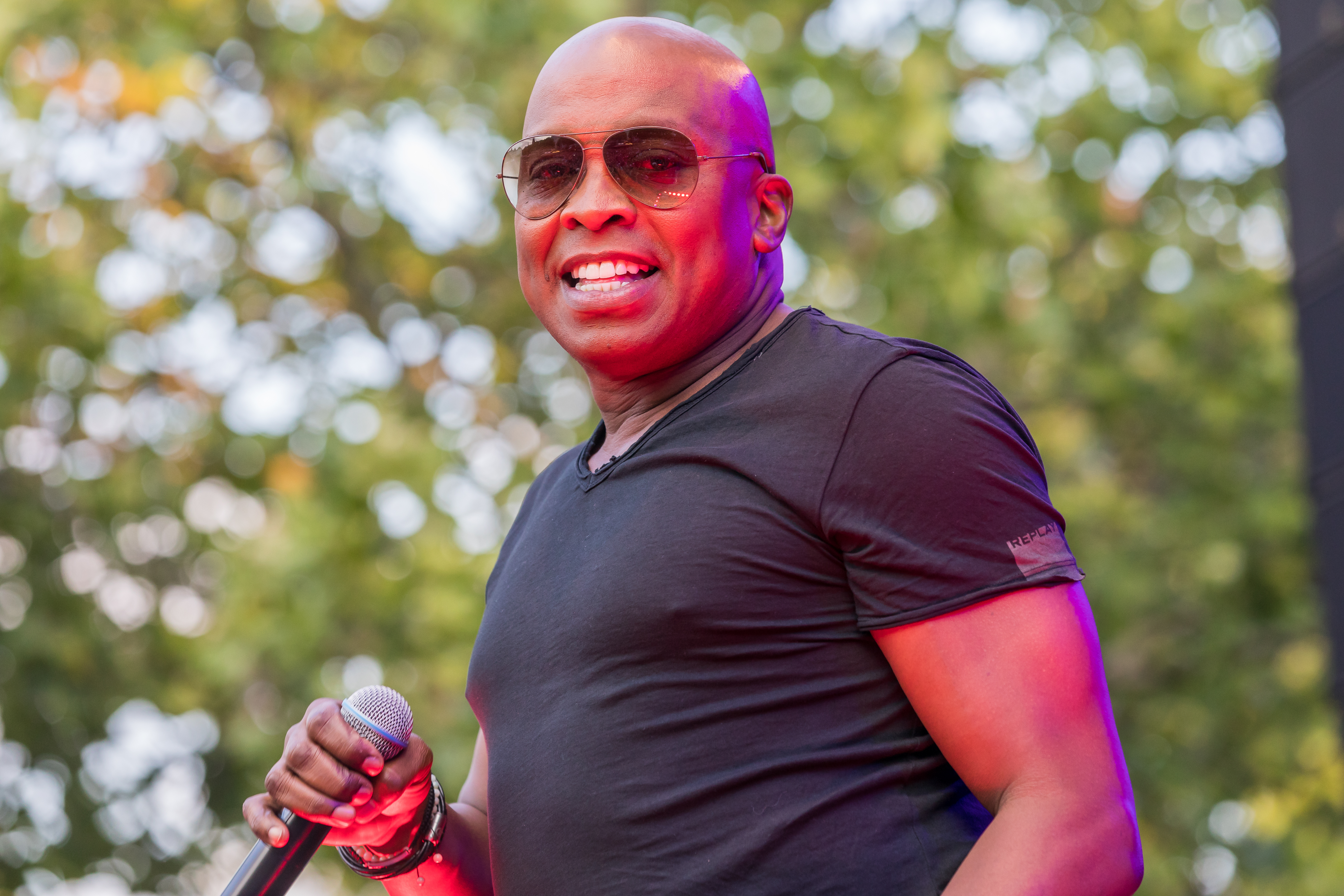
- Haddaway in 2019

Background information
- Born: Nestor Alexander Haddaway; 9 January 1965 (age 61); Port of Spain, Trinidad and Tobago
- Genre: Eurodance
- Occupations: Singer; songwriter; musician
- Instruments: Vocals; trumpet
- Years active: 1987–present
- Labels: Arista; Coconut; Razor & Tie; Sire
- Website: haddawaychannel.com

Nestor Alexander Haddaway (born 9 January 1965), known mononymously as Haddaway, is a Trinidadian-born German singer best known for his 1993 hit single "What Is Love", which reached number 1 in 13 countries.

Born in Trinidad and Tobago to a German father and a Trinidadian mother, Haddaway was raised in Chicago and the Washington metropolitan area before moving to Cologne in the late 1980s. He was signed by the German label Coconut Records in 1992, and "What Is Love" became a substantial hit across Europe the following year, reaching number two in Germany and the United Kingdom and number 11 on the US Billboard Hot 100. Worldwide sales of the single had reached 2.6 million by the beginning of 1994.

The follow-up singles "Life", "I Miss You" and "Rock My Heart" also reached the top ten in Europe, establishing him as one of the more commercially successful Eurodance artists of the period. His debut album The Album (1993) was certified platinum in Germany, and its successor The Drive (1995) produced the UK top-twenty single "Fly Away". "What Is Love" found a second audience later in the decade through its use in the Butabi brothers sketches on Saturday Night Live and the 1998 film A Night at the Roxbury.

== Early life ==
Haddaway was born in Trinidad and Tobago. His father was a marine biologist from Germany and his mother was a local nurse. His parents separated during the early 1970s and Haddaway first lived with his father in Europe, then with his mother in America. He was raised in Chicago and relocated to the Washington, DC metropolitan area at the age of 9. Listening to Louis Armstrong encouraged Haddaway to learn how to play trumpet at the age of 14. He attended Meade Senior High School in Fort Meade, Maryland, where he was a member of the marching band, which resulted eventually in him forming his first group, Chances. In 1987, Haddaway enrolled in medical school, but quit due to lack of excitement and relocated to Cologne, West Germany, where he mostly worked in taverns. Later, he formed his own company named Energy, which was involved in organizing fashion shows and photo shoots.

== Career ==
In 1992, Haddaway was signed by German record company Coconut Records. His debut single, "What Is Love", rapidly became popular in Europe, reaching number 2 in Germany and the United Kingdom. In Germany, the single sold 900,000 copies. In the United Kingdom, it received a music recording certification of Gold for shipment of 400,000 units. It later reached number 11 on the Billboard Hot 100 and was certified Gold for shipments of 500,000 units. By the beginning of 1994, worldwide sales of "What Is Love" reached 2.6 million.

His second single, "Life", reached number 2 in Germany, number 6 in the United Kingdom, and number 41 in the US, and its worldwide sales reached 1.5 million by 1994. The follow-up singles "I Miss You" and "Rock My Heart" also reached the Top 10 in Europe and established him as a successful Eurodance artist. His first LP, The Album (also known as Haddaway in the US), was a multi-million seller which reached Platinum status in Germany for shipments of 500,000, and Gold in the UK and in France for shipments of 100,000.

In 1995, he released his second album, The Drive, which included the UK top 20 hit "Fly Away", as well as "Catch a Fire" and "Lover Be Thy Name". "What Is Love" enjoyed a resurgence in popularity as the theme music for the Butabi brothers (Will Ferrell and Chris Kattan) on Saturday Night Live and the 1998 film A Night at the Roxbury.

The albums Let's Do It Now (1998) and My Face (2000; re-released as Love Makes) all failed to chart.

Haddaway appeared on the television show Comeback – Die große Chance in Germany in 2004. He appeared on the UK version of Hit Me, Baby, One More Time in 2005 and subsequently appeared on the U.S. version. This exposure led to him scoring a moderate chart hit in Germany with the ballad "Spaceman" from his next album, Pop Splits.

In 2008, "What Is Love" was featured in a commercial for Diet Pepsi MAX that aired during Super Bowl XLII which parodied the leitmotif and included several stars including LL Cool J, Missy Elliott, and Busta Rhymes, but Haddaway himself did not appear in the ad.

In 2008, Haddaway teamed up with Eurodance star Dr. Alban for the single "I Love the 90's". In 2009, "What Is Love" re-entered charts after German DJ Klaas remixed it. The track resurfaced again in 2010 when it sampled heavily in Eminem's single "No Love" featuring Lil Wayne. In 2012, Haddaway released the single "Up and Up" with the Mad Stuntman, which was a top 20 dance hit in the US.

In 2011, he said that most of his performances are in "the east", in places such as Kazakhstan, Uzbekistan, or Siberia.

In 2016, he announced plans to star in Neverending Dream, a film about Eurodance. Despite launching a fundraiser on Indiegogo, the film was not released.

On 26 April 2024, Haddaway released the single "Lift Your Head Up" off his sixth studio album, The Sun (2026).

== Personal life ==
Haddaway lives in Kitzbühel, Austria, and also has a home in Cologne, Germany.

Since 2019, he has been a player and sponsor of the baseball team Kufstein Wolfins. The team won the regional championships in 2019 and 2020.

== Discography ==
=== Studio albums ===
Title	Details	Peak chart positions											Certifications (sales threshold)
Title	Details	GER	AUS	AUT	FIN	FRA	NL	NOR	SWE	SWI	UK	US	Certifications (sales threshold)
The Album	Release date: 13 September 1993; Label: Arista; Formats: LP, CD, cassette	5	73	12	—	17	16	5	3	2	9	111	GER: Platinum; AUT: Gold; FIN: Gold; FRA: Gold; SWE: Gold; SWI: Platinum; UK: Gold
The Drive	Release date: 26 June 1995; Label: Coconut; Formats: LP, CD, cassette	32	—	27	18	—	54	—	—	10	—	—	
Let's Do It Now	Release date: 28 December 1998; Label: Coconut; Formats: CD	—	—	—	—	—	—	—	—	—	—	—	
My Face (re-released as Love Makes)	Release date: 3 September 2001 / 2 July 2002; Label: Terzetto; Formats: CD	—	—	—	—	—	—	—	—	—	—	—	
Pop Splits	Release date: 18 July 2005; Label: Coconut; Formats: CD, digital download	—	—	—	—	—	—	—	—	—	—	—	
The Sun	Release date: 16 March 2026; Label: Haddaway Channel; Formats: digital download	—	—	—	—	—	—	—	—	—	—	—	

=== Compilation albums ===
Title	Details
All the Best: His Greatest Hits	Release date: 10 April 1999; Label: BMG; Formats: CD, cassette
Best of Haddaway: What Is Love	Release date: 5 January 2004; Label: BMG Special Products; Formats: CD, music download

=== Singles ===
Year	Single	Peak chart positions										Certifications (sales threshold)	Album
Year	Single	GER	AUS	AUT	FRA	IRE	NL	SWE	SWI	UK	US	Certifications (sales threshold)	Album
1993	"What Is Love"	2	12	1	1	1	1	2	1	2	11	GER: 3× Gold; AUS: Gold; AUT: Platinum; SWE: Gold; UK: Platinum; US: Gold	The Album / Haddaway
1993	"Life"	2	34	2	5	3	3	1	2	6	41	GER: Platinum; AUT: Gold; SWE: Gold	The Album / Haddaway
1993	"I Miss You"	18	44	11	16	13	21	36	17	9	—		The Album / Haddaway
1994	"Rock My Heart"	10	83	12	11	9	12	17	10	9	—		The Album / Haddaway
1994	"Stir It Up"	—	—	—	—	—	—	—	—	—	—		The Album / Haddaway
1995	"Fly Away"	25	—	16	23	28	9	14	9	20	—		The Drive
1995	"Catch a Fire"	38	—	30	—	—	17	—	20	39	—		The Drive
1995	"Lover Be Thy Name"	65	—	—	—	—	—	—	—	—	—		The Drive
1997	"What About Me"	—	—	24	—	—	—	—	—	—	—		Let's Do It Now
2000	"Who Do You Love"	93	—	—	—	—	—	—	—	—	—		Let's Do It Now
2000	"You're Taking My Heart"	—	—	—	—	—	—	—	—	—	—		Let's Do It Now
2001	"Deep"	—	—	—	—	—	—	—	—	—	—		My Face / Love Makes
2002	"Love Makes"	81	—	—	—	—	—	—	—	—	—		My Face / Love Makes
2003	"What Is Love Reloaded"	51	—	49	—	—	100	—	—	92	—		—N/a
2005	"Spaceman"	67	—	—	—	—	—	—	—	—	—		Pop Splits
2007	"Follow Me"	—	—	—	—	—	—	—	—	—	—		—N/a
2008	"I Love the 90's" (with Dr. Alban)	—	—	—	—	—	—	—	—	—	—		—N/a
2009	"What Is Love 2k9" (with Klaas)	60	—	37	5	—	—	49	—	—	—		—N/a
2010	"You Gave Me Love"	—	—	—	—	—	—	—	—	—	—		—N/a
2012	"Up and Up" (with The Mad Stuntman)	—	—	—	—	—	—	—	—	—	— (Note: "Up and Up" reached #20 on Billboard's Hot Dance Club Songs chart.)		—N/a
2020	"I Wanna Be for You"	—	—	—	—	—	—	—	—	—	—		N/A
2021	"And Now"	—	—	—	—	—	—	—	—	—	—		Day After Day
2022	"Chances"	—	—	—	—	—	—	—	—	—	—		
2022	"Thing Called Love" (with Wolfram)	—	—	—	—	—	—	—	—	—	—		
2024	"Lift Your Head Up"	—	—	—	—	—	—	—	—	—	—		The Sun
2026	"The Sun"	—	—	—	—	—	—	—	—	—	—		The Sun
"—" denotes releases that did not chart.
