= What Is Love =

1993 song by Haddaway

Single by Haddaway

from the album The Album
- B-side: "Sing About Love"
- Released: 18 January 1993
- Genre: Eurodance; dance-pop; soul
- Length: 4:00 (radio edit); 4:29 (7-inch mix); 6:40 (12-inch mix)
- Label: Coconut
- Songwriters: Dee Dee Halligan; Junior Torello
- Producers: Dieter Lünstedt; Karin Hartmann-Eisenblätter

Haddaway singles chronology
"What Is Love" (1993)	"Life" (1993)

Music video
- "What Is Love" on YouTube

"What Is Love" is a song by Trinidadian singer Haddaway, released through Coconut Records as his debut single in January 1993. It served as the lead single from his debut album, The Album (1993). The song was both written and produced by Dee Dee Halligan and Karin Hartmann-Eisenblätter. It was a hit across Europe, becoming a number-one single in at least 13 countries and reaching number two in Germany, Sweden and the United Kingdom. Outside Europe, the single peaked at number 11 in the United States, number 12 in Australia, number 17 in Canada, and number 48 in New Zealand.

"What Is Love" earned Haddaway two awards at the German 1994 Echo Award, in the categories "Best National Single" and "Best National Dance Single." The music video for "What Is Love" was directed by Volker Hannwacker and received heavy rotation on music television such as MTV Europe. The song remains Haddaway's most popular and signature song.

== Background ==
"We just used ideas that were fresh at that time and tried to make something that nobody else had [...] The song came really fast. I had the idea for the melodies in about 45 minutes and the total structure of the song was done in a day and a half."

— Haddaway talking to The National about the making of the song.

"What Is Love" was written and produced by German music producer and composer Dee Dee Halligan (Dieter Lünstedt a.k.a. Tony Hendrik) and his partner/wife Junior Torello (Karin Hartmann-Eisenblätter a.k.a. Karin van Haaren) of Coconut Records in Hennef (Sieg) near Cologne. They had previously produced songs for successful groups like Bad Boys Blue and Londonbeat, and were waiting for the right singer for their new song. Trinidadian-born singer Nestor Alexander Haddaway was then chosen to sing it. He used to work as a producer, dancer and choreographer before he was signed to the label. He had lived in the US before moving to Germany. Haddaway did not actually want to be a solo artist. He just wanted to be a producer, but to help a friend at Coconut that needed to pay the bills, he agreed to do some songs for his friend.

The producers of "What Is Love" wanted Haddaway to try singing the song in the style of Joe Cocker. He told them, "I love Joe Cocker, but I'm no Joe Cocker." He then came up with his own idea of how to sing it and the producers let the singer try it his way. Hendrik would lock himself in the studio; eight or nine days later, he came out with the song as was released. Haddaway told Simon Price of Melody Maker in 1994, that the song was originally a ballad and arrived after a year in a basement studio, "In the beginning it was like five different pies, then those five pies became one pie." The female vocal on the track, meanwhile, was a stock sample released on the Zero-G sample compilation CD "Datafile 1" (tracks 62–64), which was produced in 1991 by Zero-G co-founder and Jack 'N' Chill member Ed Stratton, aka Man Machine, and was aimed at dance producers, DJs, programmers and artists. At first, it was difficult to sell the song. Haddaway told in 2018, "Nobody wanted it. Every radio station said no. All the record companies said no. Everybody turned us down. And we got very lucky. There was a new radio station opening in Cologne at the WDR and yeah, they used 'What Is Love' as a jingle. And we sent it out to like a thousand DJs to see what they thought about it and everyone gave a thumbs-up."

== Chart performance ==
"What Is Love" reached number one in 13 countries: Austria (9 weeks), Belgium (6 weeks), Denmark (3 weeks), Finland, France (5 weeks), Ireland, Italy (3 weeks), Netherlands (6 weeks), Norway (8 weeks), Portugal (1 week), Spain (4 weeks), Switzerland (5 weeks), and Zimbabwe (4 weeks). In Sweden, Germany and the United Kingdom, it peaked at number two, being kept off the top spot by Snow's "Informer", Ace of Base's "All That She Wants" and Gabrielle's "Dreams". In the latter, the song peaked at number two on the UK Singles Chart in its fifth week on the chart, on 27 June 1993. It stayed at that position for two weeks and within the chart for 16 weeks. Additionally, "What Is Love" was a number three hit in Iceland, and climbed to the number-one position also on the Eurochart Hot 100, where the song debuted fifteen weeks earlier, at number 79 on 13 March 1993, after charting in Germany. It stayed seven consecutive weeks at the top of the chart. Entering at number 87 on 28 August, the song reached number 11 on the Billboard Hot 100 in the United States. But on the US Cash Box Top 100, it reached the top 10, peaking at number nine. The single also peaked at numbers 12 and 48 in Australia and New Zealand, respectively. By March 1994, worldwide sales of "What Is Love" had already reached 2.6 million.

== Critical reception ==
Upon the release, Larry Flick from Billboard magazine named the song a "glorious pop/house ditty", and stated that "wildly catchy chorus is complemented by a slick, synth-happy arrangement. Haddaway will conjure up images of Seal and Sydney Youngblood with his worldly baritone delivery. A sure-fire dance hit that has the muscle to push its way onto pop formats with ease." Milo Miles from The Boston Globe wrote, "He pours such delicacy and anguish into the short phrases they become loud whispers that stay in the ear. With perfectly lubricated synthesizers bouncing away behind him, Haddaway gets precious mileage out of minimal lyrics." Student newspaper Columbia Daily Spectator said it "will transport you instantly to the golden age of house music." Jim Farber from Daily News noted that "What Is Love" "uses every sound it has to punch the beat: a stabbing synth line, a tense bass, an uplifting lead vocal and an encouragingly frantic female voice to back it up. It's a sound at once insinuating and insistent, sensual and wild." He also named it "the world's natural followup" to Robin S.' "Show Me Love". Dave Sholin from the Gavin Report commented, "Try sitting still seconds after this upbeat entry kicks in." He also noted that Haddaway's style is reminiscent "of the Fine Young Cannibals and just as exciting".

In his weekly UK chart commentary, James Masterton stated that the song "is undoubtedly one of the best soul releases of the year". Pan-European magazine Music & Media remarked that it has a "fast house beat augmented by Nestor Haddaway's deeply soulful vocals. This is definitely on par with anything that has come out of Chicago's deep house scene for quite some time." Wendi Cermak from The Network Forty described the track as "splendiferous", and noted that "the eargasmic synth stabs in the extended mix are pulling even odds in Vegas for dance-floor-filling capability and the edit screams for radio airplay..." Luke Turner from The Quietus felt that "What Is Love" "bangs because it manages to be two things—a terrific soul tune but also rather stern as well, with infernally naggy synth lines and drilled repetition in the rhythms." Tony Cross from Smash Hits gave it a score of four out of five, writing, "Haddaway's attempt at producing something along the lines of Seal's 'Crazy' hasn't quite been pulled off, but this foot-friendly dance track is still stonking dance-floor stuff. You don't find out what love is, but that doesn't mean you'll be disappointed." Another Smash Hits editor, Pete Stanton, named it "a disco-dancing, ass-grooving, tum-churning corker of a song".

== Retrospective response ==
"People always ask me about what I meant, [...] I meant that 'what is love' needs to be defined by everyone by his own definition. It's unique and individual. For me, it has to do with trust, honesty, and dedication."

— Haddaway talking to Flavorwire about the meaning of the song.

NME ranked "What Is Love" number two in their list of "Top Five Euro-Hits of All Time" in December 1993, writing, "Haddaway takes one of the fundamental questions of man's existence and puts it to a stomping disco beat. Also features a woman wailing disconsolately in the background whenever Hadders relents from his search." In 1994, Peter Paphides and Simon Price of Melody Maker praised songs such as "Mr. Vain", "Rhythm Is a Dancer" and "What Is Love" as modern classics, "butt-shaking Wagnerian disco monsters. Or, as someone else who knew a thing or two put it: Che Guevara and Debussy to a disco beat."

AllMusic editor Jose F. Promis named "What Is Love" "one of the 1990s' quintessential dance tunes". In a 2015 retrospective review, Victor Beigelman from The A.V. Club declared it as a "Europop banger that more than 20 years later remains relentlessly catchy and far more profound than it ever had any right to be." Mike Wood from Idolator featured it in their list of "The 50 Best Pop Singles of 1994" in 2014, calling it a "catchy" anthem, that "permeated our collective consciousness given the heavily-repeated airplay".

== Music video ==
The accompanying music video of "What Is Love" was directed by German music video director Volker Hannwacker and produced by AVA Studios. It features Haddaway in Mentmore Towers pursued by three femme fatales, at least one of whom is a vampire. Some scenes feature the singer and the vampire running backwards. Keith Dorwick analyzed the video in his book Love Song, writing, "He is first dressed in a blue suit with a white shirt, but upon being bitten by a white female vampire, he is converted to a boy toy with seeming supernatural powers. Now dressed in tight pants and an open vest that shows off his smooth and surprisingly chiseled chest, he easily leaps onto the fireplace mantel where he begins dancing, then flies down in a smooth leap that demonstrates his new vampiric power." The video received heavy rotation on MTV Europe in May 1993.

== Accolades ==
Year	Publisher	Country	Accolade	Rank
1993	NME	United Kingdom	"Top Five Euro-Hits of All Time"	2
1994	Echo Award	Germany	"Best National Single"	1
1994	Echo Award	Germany	"Best National Dance Single"	1
2005	Bruce Pollock	United States	"The 7,500 Most Important Songs of 1944–2000"	*
2011	Paste	United States	"Awesome One-Hit Wonders of the 1990s"	6
2011	MTV Dance	United Kingdom	"The 100 Biggest 90's Dance Anthems of All Time"	57
2012	Porcys	Poland	"100 Singli 1990–1999"	77
2013	Complex	United States	"10 Essential Eurodance Classics"	*
2013	Max	Australia	"1000 Greatest Songs of All Time"	189
2013	Vibe	United States	"Before EDM: 30 Dance Tracks from the '90s that Changed the Game"	4
2014	Idolator	United States	"The 50 Best Pop Singles of 1994"	5
2014	The Quietus	United Kingdom	"The Quietus Writers' 50 Favourite Guilt-Free Pleasures"	*
2017	BuzzFeed	United States	"The 101 Greatest Dance Songs of the '90s"	11
2019	Elle	United States	"52 Best 1990s Pop Songs"	39
2019	Insider	United States	"The 57 Best One-Hit Wonders of All Time"	*
2024	Cosmopolitan	United States	"60 of the Best '90s Songs for the Ultimate Throwback Playlist"	19
2025	American Songwriter	United States	"3 of the Best Opening Lines in One-Hit Wonder Songs from the 1990s"	*

(*) indicates the list is unordered.

== Charts ==
=== Weekly charts ===
==== Original version ====
Chart (1993–1994)	Peak position
Australia (ARIA)	12
Austria (Ö3 Austria Top 40)	1
Belgium (Ultratop 50 Flanders)	1
Canada Top Singles (RPM)	17
Canada Dance/Urban (RPM)	2
Denmark (IFPI)	1
Europe (Eurochart Hot 100)	1
Europe (European Dance Radio)	4
Europe (European Hit Radio)	6
Finland (Suomen virallinen lista)	1
France (SNEP)	1
Germany (GfK)	2
Iceland (Íslenski Listinn Topp 40)	3
Ireland (IRMA)	1
Israel (Israeli Singles Chart)	2
Italy (Musica e dischi)	1
Netherlands (Dutch Top 40)	1
Netherlands (Single Top 100)	1
New Zealand (Recorded Music NZ)	48
Norway (VG-lista)	1
Portugal (AFP)	1
Quebec (ADISQ)	10
Spain (AFYVE)	1
Sweden (Sverigetopplistan)	2
Switzerland (Schweizer Hitparade)	1
UK Singles (Official Charts)	2
UK Airplay (Music Week)	1
UK Dance (Music Week)	3
UK Club Chart (Music Week)	9
US Billboard Hot 100	11
US Hot Dance Club Play (Billboard)	9
US Hot Dance Music/Maxi-Singles Sales (Billboard)	6
US Rhythmic Top 40 (Billboard)	15
US Top 40 Mainstream (Billboard)	4
US Cash Box Top 100	9
Zimbabwe (ZIMA)	1

Chart (2011)	Peak position
UK Singles Downloads (Official Charts)	80

Chart (2020–2026)	Peak position
Germany Dance (GfK)	9
Hungary (Single Top 40)	37
Kazakhstan Airplay (TopHit)	75
Moldova Airplay (TopHit)	73
Poland (Polish Airplay Top 100)	49
Slovenia (SloTop50)	46

==== "What Is Love" – Remix ====
Chart (1993)	Peak position
Switzerland (Schweizer Hitparade)	15
Spain (AFYVE)	4

==== "What Is Love" – Reloaded ====
Chart (2003)	Peak position
Austria (Ö3 Austria Top 40)	49
Denmark (Tracklisten)	20
Germany (Media Control Charts)	51
Hungary (Dance Top 40)	13
Netherlands (Single Top 100)	100
Switzerland (Schweizer Hitparade)	92

==== Other reissues ====
Chart (2008)	Peak position
US Billboard Hot Digital Songs	68

Chart (2012)	Peak position
Denmark (Tracklisten)	31

=== Year-end charts ===
Chart (1993)	Position
Australia (ARIA)	78
Austria (Ö3 Austria Top 40)	3
Belgium (Ultratop 50 Flanders)	3
Canada Dance/Urban (RPM)	2
Europe (Eurochart Hot 100)	2
Europe (European Dance Radio)	8
Europe (European Hit Radio)	8
Germany (Media Control)	2
Iceland (Íslenski Listinn Topp 40)	24
Israel (Israeli Singles Chart)	15
Netherlands (Dutch Top 40)	2
Netherlands (Single Top 100)	4
Sweden (Topplistan)	17
Switzerland (Schweizer Hitparade)	2
UK Singles (OCC)	8
UK Airplay (Music Week)	9
US Billboard Hot 100	82
US Maxi-Singles Sales (Billboard)	10

Chart (1994)	Position
US Billboard Hot 100	97

2024 year-end chart performance for "What Is Love"
Chart (2024)	Position
Kazakhstan Airplay (TopHit)	175
Lithuania Airplay (TopHit)	117

2025 year-end chart performance for "What Is Love"
Chart (2025)	Position
Lithuania Airplay (TopHit)	139

=== Decade-end charts ===
Decade-end chart performance for "What is Love"
Chart (1990–1999)	Position
Austria (Ö3 Austria Top 40)	68
Belgium (Ultratop 50 Flanders)	27
Netherlands (Dutch Top 40)	32

== Certifications and sales ==
Region	Certification	Certified units/sales
Australia (ARIA)	Gold	35,000^{^}
Austria (IFPI Austria)	Platinum	50,000^{*}
Denmark (IFPI Danmark)	Platinum	90,000^{‡}
France (SNEP)	Gold	100,000^{‡}
Germany (BVMI)	3× Gold	900,000
Italy (FIMI) sales since 2009	Platinum	70,000^{‡}
New Zealand (RMNZ)	2× Platinum	60,000^{‡}
Sweden (GLF)	Gold	25,000^{^}
United Kingdom (BPI)	2× Platinum	1,200,000^{‡}
United States (RIAA)	Gold	500,000^{^}
Summaries
Worldwide	—	2,600,000
^{*} Sales figures based on certification alone.^{^} Shipments figures based on certification alone.^{‡} Sales+streaming figures based on certification alone.

== Release history ==
Region	Date	Format(s)	Label(s)	Ref.
Europe	18 January 1993	—N/a	Coconut	
United Kingdom	24 May 1993	7-inch vinyl; 12-inch vinyl; CD; cassette	Logic	
Australia	19 July 1993	12-inch vinyl; CD; cassette	Coconut; BMG-Ariola	
Japan	16 December 1993	Mini-CD	Ariola Japan; Coconut	

== Cover versions and sampling ==
- In 2007, the song was covered by indie band The Gossip, with lead singer Beth Ditto changing the lyrics to "When Is Lunch?, Baby I'm Hungry, I'm Hungry, For More".
- In 2009, singer and songwriter Diane Birch completely rearranged the song, that later was featured on Billboard magazine's Mashup Monday in 2010.
- In 2010, Swedish boy band E.M.D. released a piano ballad version of "What Is Love" as the second single from their sophomore studio album Rewind.
- In 2010, American rappers Eminem and Lil Wayne sampled the song for the single "No Love" from Eminem's seventh studio album, Recovery.
- In 2011, the German melodic death metal/metalcore band Emergency Gate covered the song, in collaboration with Haddaway, for their 2011 EP Remembrance (The Early Days).
- In 2014, Canadian singer Kiesza did a "piano-and-synth cover" of the song for her album Sound of a Woman.
- In 2016, neofolk act Death in Rome did a cover on their album Hitparade, which consists solely of cover versions of hit songs.
- A cover version by Ultraclub 90 is included as one of the tracks in Just Dance 2017.
- In 2023, French DJ David Guetta announced his own cover titled "Baby Don't Hurt Me", featuring Anne-Marie and Coi Leray.

=== Klaas version ===
"Klaas meets Haddaway – What Is Love 2K9"

Single by Klaas
- Released: 2009
- Label: Mostiko
- Songwriters: Dee Dee Halligan; Junior Torello
- Producer: Klaas

Music video
- "What is Love 2K9" on YouTube

In 2009, German DJ Klaas remixed the song under the title "Klaas meets Haddaway – What Is Love 2K9". This remix charted in several European countries.

Chart (2009)	Peak position
Austria (Ö3 Austria Top 40)	37
Belgium (Ultratop 50 Flanders)	41
Belgium (Ultratip Bubbling Under Wallonia)	9
France (SNEP)	5
Germany (GfK)	60
Sweden (Sverigetopplistan)	49

=== Lost Frequencies version ===
"What Is Love 2016"

Single by Lost Frequencies

from the album Less Is More
- Released: 2016
- Length: 2:52
- Label: Armada; Mostiko
- Songwriters: Dee Dee Halligan; Junior Torello; Felix De Laet
- Producers: Hal Ritson; Felix De Laet

Lost Frequencies singles chronology
"Beautiful Life" (2016)	"What Is Love 2016" (2016)	"All or Nothing" (2017)

Music video
- "What Is Love 2016" on YouTube

In 2016, Belgian DJ Lost Frequencies released a cover titled "What Is Love 2016", as a single from his debut album Less Is More. It was actually already produced back in 2014 as a remix for Jaymes Young's cover version of "What is Love". This version was remade for the album and became a hit on a number of European singles charts and topped the Belgian Ultratop Official Singles Chart.

==== Music video ====
An official music video was released directed by Soulvizion. It features the Dutch professional basketball player Don Rigters who plays the role of David Rose, a basketball player who is severely injured trying to make a comeback to the game with encouragement from his girlfriend, (played by Melissa Kanza), his three teammates, (Alkenah Wansing, Jeroen Jansen and Lindy Chippendel) and by his basketball coach (played by J E Rigters).

==== Charts ====
===== Weekly charts =====
Chart (2016–2017)	Peak position
Austria (Ö3 Austria Top 40)	20
Belgium (Ultratop 50 Flanders)	1
Belgium (Ultratop 50 Wallonia)	12
France (SNEP)	92
Germany (GfK)	24
Germany (Airplay Chart)	2
Hungary (Rádiós Top 40)	40
Netherlands (Single Top 100)	73
Poland Airplay (ZPAV)	29
Slovakia Airplay (ČNS IFPI)	38
Slovenia (SloTop50)	20
Sweden (Sverigetopplistan)	99
Switzerland (Schweizer Hitparade)	52

===== Year-end charts =====
Chart (2016)	Position
Belgium (Ultratop 50 Flanders)	41

==== Certifications ====
Region	Certification	Certified units/sales
Belgium (BRMA)	2× Platinum	40,000^{‡}
Germany (BVMI)	Gold	200,000^{‡}
^{‡} Sales+streaming figures based on certification alone.

== In popular culture ==
In 1994, "What Is Love" served as the soundtrack to the memorable climax of the "Life of Brian" episode of My So-Called Life, in which Rickie Vasquez and Delia Fisher dance together at their high school's World Happiness Dance.

In the late 1990s, the song was featured in the popular, recurring Saturday Night Live "The Roxbury Guys" sketches, in which the characters Steve and Doug Butabi (played by Will Ferrell and Chris Kattan, respectively) would wildly bob their heads to the track as they went out nightclubbing and had misadventures. Typically the song would play throughout the sketch, following the brothers wherever they went. The Butabis were sometimes joined by other head-bobbing club-goers portrayed by the show's guests hosts, such as Jim Carrey. In 1998, the sketches spawned a film, A Night at the Roxbury, which prominently featured the song. In the mid-2000s, the sketch became a popular internet meme.

"What Is Love" was also used in the 2013 video game Saints Row IV.

The song was also sung by Ulysses Klaue (played by Andy Serkis) while being interrogated by Everett K. Ross (played by Martin Freeman) in the 2018 film Black Panther. The scene became an internet meme, and was praised as one of the best scenes in the film.

The song was used in the Disney+ series Percy Jackson and the Olympians.

The song is used by Los Angeles Dodgers pitcher Kyle Hurt for his walkout song.

== See also ==
- List of Dutch Top 40 number-one singles of 1993
- List of number-one hits of 1993 (Austria)
- List of number-one hits of 1993 (Italy)
- List of number-one singles of 1993 (Finland)
- List of number-one singles of 1993 (France)
- List of number-one singles of 1993 (Spain)
- List of number-one singles of the 1990s (Switzerland)
- VG-lista 1964 to 1994
- VRT Top 30 number-one hits of 1993
