= Guru Josh =

Jersey musician (1964–2015)

Background information
- Born: Paul Dudley Walden; 6 June 1964; Bailiwick of Jersey
- Died: 28 December 2015 (aged 51) Ibiza, Balearic Islands, Spain
- Genres: Acid house; techno
- Years active: 1981–2015
- Labels: Deconstruction; Sony; Ministry of Sound

Paul Dudley Walden (6 June 1964 – 28 December 2015), better known as Guru Josh, was a Jersey musician, active in the British post-acid house scene, best known for his debut single, "Infinity".

== Biography ==
=== Musical career ===
Walden was the son of a Jersey dentist, Harold Walden. After studying dentistry himself in 1981, he began his career as an entertainer and keyboard player at the Sands nightclub in Jersey, performing under the names Syndrone, and Animal and his Crazy Organs. In 1983 he moved to the United States to pursue a musical career but did not progress, instead working as a chauffeur and decorator. He withdrew £1,000 and moved to London, setting up rock band Joshua Cry’s Wolf, alongside saxophone player Mad Mick. In 1988, Walden tried ecstasy for the first time at a London pub during the "Second Summer of Love", subsequently switching from rock to house music.

In 1989, Guru Josh released "Infinity" also known as "Infinity (1990's... Time for the Guru)", from his debut album, Infinity. Mad Mick played the saxophone on the song. The song was originally produced for a friend of Guru Josh, who was organising a warehouse party of the same name. He made 500 copies and distributed them to leading DJs. gained attention when it started to be played by Haçienda DJ Mike Pickering. Guru Josh signed for BMG Records, and the song achieved success in Europe, especially in Germany, the UK, Portugal and Austria. The song was later re-mixed and re-released on multiple occasions (the most popular remix by Klaas), still receiving particular success in 2011.

Guru Josh released several other singles in the 1990s, including "Freaky Dreamer", "Holographic Dreams" and "Whose Law (Is It Anyway?)", which reached number 26 and number 12 in the UK and Germany, respectively. In a Record Mirror interview, he endorsed the poll tax at a time that its unpopularity was leading to riots, which may have affected the outcome of "Whose Law (Is It Anyway?)". "Hallelujah" was released in 1991. Shortly after this, Guru Josh diversified into also doing multimedia production creating the Dance in Cyberspace series of music videos under the name of Dr. Devious and also VR. His single "Cyberdream" achieved heavy rotation on MTV programme Party Zone for its psychedelic video.

Following the success of "Infinity", Guru Josh moved to Ibiza, concentrating on art and running a promotions company.

In 2007, he was part of Guru Josh Project, formed by Darren Bailie and signed by Big City Beats. The group consisted of Paul Walden, Anders Nyman and Darren Bailie. In 2008, "Infinity" was re-released as "Infinity 2008", which was remixed by the German DJ Klaas. It experienced widespread success, peaking at number one on the Belgian, Dutch, French and Danish singles charts, the Czech airplay chart and the Eurochart Hot 100.

In 2010, he released a new single entitled "Frozen Teardrops". In March 2011, he released "Love of Life", with a more modern and punchy house style.

In 2012, saw the release of a remix of the 1989 original of "Infinity" called "Infinity 2012" by Guru Josh, with the main remix done by DJ Antoine. This single was then used by Langnese for a large marketing campaign promoting a new product launch during the summer of 2012 in Germany, Austria and Switzerland.

Guru Josh created 3D glass art under the name of "Louie Fabrix", sold in small exhibitions in New York, Madrid, Paris and Berlin.

=== Death ===
Walden died by suicide on 28 December 2015, at the age of 51. Associates said he had been suffering from drug and alcohol addictions as well as depression following a breakup with his girlfriend.

== Discography ==
=== Studio albums ===
Title	Details	Peak chart positions					
Title	Details	UK	AUS	AUT	GER	NED	SWI
Infinity	Released: 14 July 1990; Labels: BMG, Deconstruction; Format: Vinyl, cassette, CD	41	80	15	23	79	22

=== Singles ===
Single	Year	Peak chart positions												Certifications	Album
Single	Year	UK	AUS	AUT	FIN	FRA	GER	IRE	ITA	NED	NOR	SWE	SWI	Certifications	Album
"Infinity (1990s...Time for the Guru)"	1989	5	4	5	—	—	2	8	—	3	5	―	4	ARIA: Platinum; BVMI: Gold	Infinity
"Whose Law (Is It Anyway?)"	1990	26	64	18	—	—	12	23	—	30	—	—	14		Infinity
"Infinity 2008" (as Guru Josh Project)	2008	3	—	3	6	1	4	10	20	1	3	8	2	BPI: Platinum; BVMI: Gold; IFPI SWE: Gold	Non-album singles
"Let Me Know (Infinity)" (as Copycatz presents P.Six vs. Guru Josh Project)	2009	—	—	—	—	—	71	—	—	—	—	—	—		Non-album singles
"Crying in the Rain" (as Guru Josh Project)	2009	—	—	—	—	—	—	—	—	—	—	—	—		Non-album singles
"Eternity"	2009	—	—	—	—	—	—	—	—	—	—	—	24		Non-album singles
"Frozen Teardrops"	2010	—	—	—	—	—	—	—	—	—	—	—	—		Non-album singles
"Love of Life"	2011	—	—	—	—	—	—	—	—	—	—	—	—		Non-album singles
"Infinity 2012"	2012	—	—	10	—	—	14	—	—	—	—	—	16	FIMI: Gold	Non-album singles
"Ray of Sunshine"	2013	—	—	—	—	—	—	—	—	—	—	—	—		Non-album singles
"Love to Infinity" (with Anike Ekina and Darren Bailie)	2020	—	—	—	—	—	—	—	—	—	—	—	—		Non-album singles
"—" denotes a single that did not chart
