= Life (Haddaway song) =

1993 single by Haddaway

Single by Haddaway

from the album The Album
- Released: 30 July 1993
- Recorded: Metalworks (Mississauga, Ontario)
- Genre: Eurodance
- Length: 4:18 (radio edit); 6:00 (12-inch mix)
- Label: Coconut
- Songwriters: Dee Dee Halligan; Junior Torello
- Producers: Dee Dee Halligan; Junior Torello

Haddaway singles chronology
| "What Is Love" (1993) | "Life" (1993) | "I Miss You" (1993) |

Music video
- "Life" on YouTube

"Life" (also known as "Life (Everybody Needs Somebody to Love)" in the United States) is a song by Trinidadian-German Eurodance artist Haddaway. Written and produced by Dee Dee Halligan (Tony Hendrik) and Junior Torello (Karin Hartmann-Eisenblätter), the song was released in July 1993 by Coconut Records as the second single from Haddaway's debut album, The Album (1993), and the follow-up to his successful debut single, "What Is Love". The song peaked at number one in Finland, Greece, Israel, Spain and Sweden, as well as on the RPM Dance/Urban chart and the Eurochart Hot 100, and was a top-10 hit in at least 13 countries. Its music video, partly inspired by the 1927 film Metropolis, was directed by Angel Gracia and filmed in Frankfurt, Germany. By March 1994, the single had sold 1.5 million copies worldwide.

== Release ==
"Life" was released as a single in Europe on 30 July 1993 by German label Coconut Records and in the UK on 13 September same year, by Logic. Another CD maxi were produced at the end of 1993, containing new remixes from Bass Bumpers and others.

== Critical reception ==
AllMusic editor Jose F. Promis complimented Haddaway's "passionate, urgent delivery" on the song. Larry Flick from Billboard magazine wrote, "Although there is no denying the stylistic similarity to Haddaway's huge 'What Is Love', this single gains its own strength through a fun, sing-along chorus and warmly upbeat lyrics. Added pleasure comes from Haddaway's assured voice." He also remarked that it "does have a chorus that instantly sticks to the brain". Dave Sholin from the Gavin Report noted that the singer "delivers an early Christmas present. 'Life...' comes complete with a melody as compelling as his debut smash". A reviewer from Kingston Informer praised it as "brilliant". In his weekly UK chart commentary, James Masterton said, "The new track aims to repeat this same formula and does so just about." Pan-European magazine Music & Media stated that "variations on a theme have always been bona fide recording tricks and subsequently 'Life' will be 'What Is Love?' Part II."

Alan Jones from Music Week gave it a score of four out of five, describing it as "a bouncy, commercial Euro-house track which will have little appeal to club cognoscenti but will delight the mainstream audience." He added, "It won't be as big as 'What Is Love?' (few records are) but should safely reach the Top 10." John Kilgo from The Network Forty found that it is "familiar in sound" to his debut single, noting further that "this tune will research phenomenally, following in the heels of its predecessor." Reading Evening Post's reviewer felt it "provides strong evidence to suggest that Haddaway won't be a one-hit wonder", adding that "he sounds like Seal". James Hamilton from the Record Mirror Dance Update deemed it a "simple Teutonic pop bounder" in his weekly dance column. Tom Doyle from Smash Hits gave it one out of five, calling it "an uninspired plodder which recycles the synth tune from Snap's 'Rhythm Is a Dancer' and ponders the notion that Life will never be the same/Life is changing."

== Chart performance ==
In Europe, "Life" peaked at number one in Finland, Greece, Spain (1 week), and Sweden (1 week), as well as on the Eurochart Hot 100. In addition, the single reached number two in Austria, Denmark, Germany, Italy, and Switzerland. In these countries, it was held off the top position by 4 Non Blondes' "What's Up" and Culture Beat's "Mr. Vain" (Italy). In Germany, "Life" debuted at number nine on the German Top 100 on 9 August 1993, peaking four weeks later with five weeks at the same position. It spent 25 weeks within the chart. It was a top-five hit also in Belgium, France, Iceland, Ireland, Lithuania, the Netherlands, and Norway.

In the United Kingdom, it peaked at number six on the UK Singles Chart on 3 October, after entering at number eight three weeks earlier on the chart. It stayed at that position for two weeks. On the Music Week Dance Singles chart, it reached number two, behind M People's "Moving On Up". "Life" debuted on the Eurochart Hot 100 at number 30 on 14 August, after charting in Austria, Belgium, Denmark, Germany and Norway. It peaked at number one nine weeks later, on 9 October and stayed at the top for two weeks. In the same period, the song peaked at number eight on the European Dance Radio Chart, ending up as number 20 in their year-end chart of 1993.

Elsewhere, the single spent one week at the top of the Canadian RPM Dance/Urban chart. It also peaked at number 15 on the RPM 100 Hit Tracks chart. In the US, it peaked at numbers 41, three and five on the US Billboard Hot 100, Maxi-Singles Sales and Dance Club Play charts respectively, as well as number 47 on the Cash Box Top 100. In West Asia, it peaked at number one in Israel for two weeks from 28 July. In Africa, "Life" peaked at number 14 in Zimbabwe, while reaching number 34 on the Australian ARIA Top 50 singles chart in Oceania. The single was awarded with a gold record in Austria and Sweden, while in Germany, it received a platinum record for 500,000 units sold.

== Music video ==
The accompanying music video of "Life" was directed by Angel Gracia and filmed in Frankfurt, Germany. It's partly inspired by the German 1927 movie Metropolis by Fritz Lang. Haddaway plays a scientist and inventor, like Rotwang in the movie. He designs a dancing robot, the Maschinenmensch, shaped like a woman. He tries to give life to it, and after transforming it into a real woman, the two dance to the rhythm, with the woman following Haddaway's movements. In the end, as he takes off her helmet, she opens her eyes and he kisses her. The video received heavy rotation on MTV Europe in September 1993.

== Track listings ==
- CD maxi
1. "Life" (radio edit) — 4:18
2. "Life" (12-inch mix) — 6:00
3. "Life" (Club Life) — 6:13
- Cassette single
1. "Life" — 4:18
2. "Life" (instrumental) — 4:18
- CD maxi – Remixes
1. "Life / Remix" (Mission Control mix) — 7:00
2. "Life" (Bass Bumpers remix) — 5:55
3. "Life" (radio edit) — 4:15

== Charts ==
=== Weekly charts ===
Original version

| Chart (1993–1994) | Peak position |
|---|---|
| Australia (ARIA) | 34 |
| Austria (Ö3 Austria Top 40) | 2 |
| Belgium (Ultratop 50 Flanders) | 3 |
| Canada Top Singles (RPM) | 15 |
| Canada Dance/Urban (RPM) | 1 |
| Denmark (IFPI) | 2 |
| Europe (Eurochart Hot 100) | 1 |
| Europe (European Dance Radio) | 8 |
| Europe (European Hit Radio) | 4 |
| Finland (Suomen virallinen lista) | 1 |
| France (SNEP) | 5 |
| Germany (GfK) | 2 |
| Greece (Pop + Rock) | 1 |
| Iceland (Íslenski Listinn Topp 40) | 4 |
| Ireland (IRMA) | 3 |
| Israel (Israeli Singles Chart) | 1 |
| Italy (Musica e dischi) | 2 |
| Lithuania (M-1) | 3 |
| Quebec (ADISQ) | 10 |
| Netherlands (Dutch Top 40) | 3 |
| Netherlands (Single Top 100) | 3 |
| Norway (VG-lista) | 3 |
| Spain (AFYVE) | 1 |
| Sweden (Sverigetopplistan) | 1 |
| Switzerland (Schweizer Hitparade) | 2 |
| UK Singles (Official Charts) | 6 |
| UK Airplay (Music Week) | 3 |
| UK Dance (Music Week) | 2 |
| UK Club Chart (Music Week) | 9 |
| US Billboard Hot 100 | 41 |
| US Dance Club Play (Billboard) | 5 |
| US Maxi-Singles Sales (Billboard) | 3 |
| US Top 40/Mainstream (Billboard) | 14 |
| US Cash Box Top 100 | 47 |
| Zimbabwe (ZIMA) | 14 |

Remix version

| Chart (1993) | Peak position |
|---|---|
| Sweden (Sverigetopplistan) | 28 |
| Switzerland (Schweizer Hitparade) | 14 |

=== Year-end charts ===
| Chart (1993) | Position |
|---|---|
| Austria (Ö3 Austria Top 40) | 12 |
| Belgium (Ultratop 50 Flanders) | 12 |
| Europe (Eurochart Hot 100) | 13 |
| Europe (European Dance Radio) | 20 |
| Europe (European Hit Radio) | 18 |
| Germany (Media Control) | 11 |
| Israel (Israeli Singles Chart) | 30 |
| Netherlands (Dutch Top 40) | 24 |
| Netherlands (Single Top 100) | 22 |
| Sweden (Topplistan) | 13 |
| Switzerland (Schweizer Hitparade) | 13 |
| UK Singles (OCC) | 63 |
| UK Club Chart (Music Week) | 87 |

| Chart (1994) | Position |
|---|---|
| Canada Dance/Urban (RPM) | 7 |

== Certifications ==
| Region | Certification | Certified units/sales |
|---|---|---|
| Austria (IFPI Austria) | Gold | 25,000^{*} |
| Germany (BVMI) | Platinum | 500,000^{^} |
| Sweden (GLF) | Gold | 25,000^{^} |
^{*} Sales figures based on certification alone.^{^} Shipments figures based on certification alone.

== Release history ==
| Region | Date | Format(s) | Label(s) | Ref. |
|---|---|---|---|---|
| Europe | 30 July 1993 | 7-inch vinyl; CD | Coconut | |
| United Kingdom | 13 September 1993 | 7-inch vinyl; 12-inch vinyl; CD; cassette | Logic | |
| Australia | 21 February 1994 | 12-inch vinyl; CD; cassette | Coconut; BMG | |
