= Bad Boys Blue discography =

- Studio albums: 16
- Compilation albums: 29
- Singles: 35
- Remix albums: 6

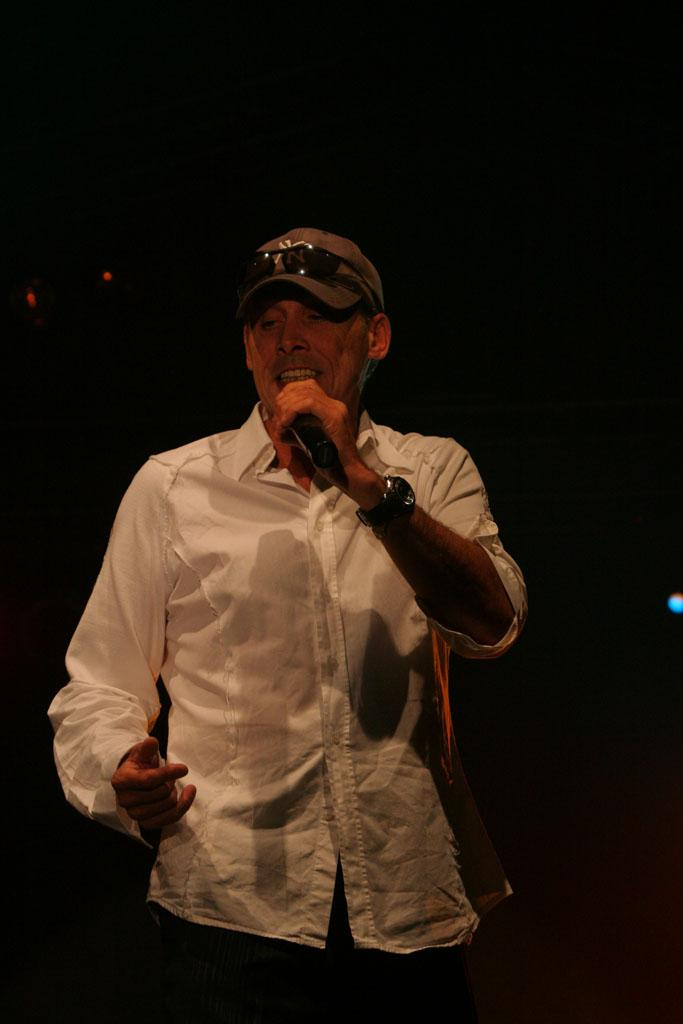
Bad Boys Blue vocalist John Mclnerny performing in 2007

The discography of multinational German dance pop group Bad Boys Blue consists of 16 studio albums, 29 compilation albums, six re-worked compilations and 35 singles. The group's biggest hit to date is "You're a Woman" released in 1985, which peaked at No. 8 in their home market, Germany. The single did well also in Austria, Sweden and Switzerland peaking at No. 1, No. 6 and No. 2 respectively.

== Albums ==
=== Studio albums ===
Title	Details	Peak chart positions				Certifications
Title	Details	GER	FIN	SWE	SWI	Certifications
Hot Girls, Bad Boys	Released: November 4, 1985; Label: Coconut; Formats: CD, cassette, LP	50	11	30	9	
Heart Beat	Released: 1986; Label: Coconut; Formats: CD, cassette, LP	—	—	—	—	
Love Is No Crime	Released: 1987; Label: Coconut; Formats: CD, cassette, LP	—	11	—	—	
My Blue World	Released: 1988; Label: Coconut; Formats: CD, cassette, LP	48	17	—	—	
The Fifth	Released: 1989; Label: Coconut; Formats: CD, cassette, LP	—	2	—	—	FIN: Gold
Game of Love	Released: October 22, 1990; Label: Coconut; Formats: CD, cassette, LP	—	7	—	—	FIN: Gold
House of Silence	Released: 1991; Label: Coconut; Formats: CD, cassette, LP	—	2	—	—	FIN: Gold
Totally	Released: October 26, 1992; Label: Coconut; Formats: CD, cassette, LP	83	17	—	—	
Kiss	Released: 1993; Label: Coconut; Formats: CD, cassette, LP	—	32	—	—	
To Blue Horizons	Released: March 24, 1994; Label: Intercord; Formats: CD, cassette, LP	83	25	—	—	
Bang Bang Bang	Released: June 20, 1996; Label: Intercord; Formats: CD, cassette	—	—	—	—	
Follow the Light	Released: September 27, 1999; Label: Coconut; Formats: CD, cassette	80	—	—	—	
Tonite	Released: July 24, 2000; Label: Coconut; Formats: CD, cassette	—	—	—	—	
Around the World	Released: August 4, 2003; Label: Koch Universal; Formats: CD	43	27	—	—	
Heart & Soul	Released: June 13, 2008; Label: Spectre Media; Formats: CD, digital download	—	—	—	—	
Tears Turning to Ice	Released: October 23, 2020; Label: BROS Musikproduktions; Formats: CD, digital download	—	—	—	—	
"—" denotes a recording that did not chart or was not released in that territory.

=== Compilation albums ===
Title	Details	Peak chart positions		Certifications
Title	Details	GER	FIN	Certifications
The Best Of – Don't Walk Away Suzanne (released in Spain only)	Released: 1988; Label: Zafiro; Formats: LP	—	—	
Bad Boys Best	Released: 1989; Label: Coconut; Formats: CD, cassette, LP	14	32	
Super 20	Released: 1989; Label: Coconut; Formats: CD, cassette, LP	—	—	
You're a Woman	Released: 1991; Label: Ariola Express; Formats: CD, cassette, LP	—	—	
The Best Of (released in Finland only)	Released: 1991; Label: Ariola; Formats: CD, cassette, LP	—	1	FIN: Platinum
More Bad Boys Best	Released: May 11, 1992; Label: Coconut; Formats: CD, cassette, LP	—	—	
Bad Boys Blue (released in USA only)	Released: February 23, 1993; Label: Zoo; Formats: CD, cassette, LP	—	—	
Dancing with the Bad Boys	Released: March 29, 1993; Label: Coconut; Formats: CD, cassette, LP	—	—	
You're a Woman	Released: January 17, 1994; Label: Ariola Express; Formats: CD, cassette, LP	—	—	
All Time Greatest Hits (released in South Africa only)	Released: 1994; Label: BMG Records Africa; Formats: CD	—	—	
With Love From... The Best of the Ballads	Released: January 12, 1998; Label: Intercord; Formats: CD, cassette	—	—	
Portrait	Released: 1999; Label: SR International; Formats: CD, cassette	—	—	
Pretty Young Girl	Released: May 10, 1999; Label: Ariola Express; Formats: CD, cassette	—	—	
Bad Boys Best 2001	Released: July 2, 2001; Label: Coconut; Formats: CD	—	—	
The Very Best Of (released in UK and South Africa only)	Released: July 24, 2001; Label: Camden, BMG Ariola München GmbH, BMG Records Africa; Formats: CD	—	—	
In the Mix	Released: May 12, 2003; Label: Ariola Express; Formats: CD	—	—	
Gwiazdy XX Wieku – Największe Przeboje (released in Poland only)	Released: 2003; Label: BMG Poland; Formats: CD	—	—	
Hit Collection Vol. 1: You're a Woman	Released: January 10, 2005; Label: Coconut Music; Formats: CD	—	—	
Hit Collection Vol. 2: The Best Of	Released: January 10, 2005; Label: Coconut Music; Formats: CD	—	—	
The Best Of (released in Russia only)	Released: 2004; Label: Sony BMG Music Entertainment; Formats: CD	—	—	
Hungry for Love	Released: August 1, 2005; Label: Delta Music; Formats: CD	—	—	
Greatest Hits	Released: October 3, 2005; Label: MCP Sound & Media; Formats: CD	—	—	
The Biggest Hits Of (released in South Africa only)	Released: 2005; Label: Select Musiek; Formats: CD	—	—	
Hit Collection	Released: September 3, 2006; Label: MCP Sound & Media; Formats: CD	—	—	
The Single Hits	Released: September 17, 2008; Label: Spectre Media; Formats: CD	—	—	
Unforgettable	Released: Oktober 30, 2009; Label: Coconut Music; Formats: CD	—	—	
Bad Boys Essential (released in Poland only)	Released: May 10, 2010; Label: 4everMUSIC; Formats: CD	—	—	
The Original Maxi-Singles Collection	Released: April 4, 2014; Label: Pokorny Music Solutions; Formats: CD	—	—	
The Original Maxi-Singles Collection Volume 2	Released: April 3, 2015; Label: Pokorny Music Solutions; Formats: CD	—	—	
The Best Of (released in Poland only)	Released: April 3, 2017; Label: Magic; Formats: LP	—	—	
Super Hits 1 (released in Russia only)	Released: 2018; Label: Nikitin Music Group; Formats: LP	—	—	
Super Hits 2 (released in Russia only)	Released: 2018; Label: Nikitin Music Group; Formats: LP	—	—	
My Star	Released: August 23, 2019; Label: DA; Formats: LP, CD	—	—	
"—" denotes a recording that did not chart or was not released in that territory.

=== Remix albums ===
Title	Details	Peak chart positions		Certifications
Title	Details	GER	FIN	Certifications
Completely Remixed	Released: August 22, 1994; Label: Coconut; Formats: CD, cassette, LP	—	—	
Back	Released: July 27, 1998; Label: Coconut; Formats: CD, cassette	28	2	FIN: Platinum
...Continued	Released: February 15, 1999; Label: Coconut; Formats: CD, cassette	38	21	
Greatest Hits Remixed	Released: January 10, 2005; Label: MCP Sound & Media AG; Formats: CD	—	—	
Rarities Remixed	Released: June 19, 2009; Label: Neo/Coconut; Formats: CD	—	—	
25 (The 25th Anniversary Album)	Released: August 27, 2010; Label: Modern Romantics Productions Sarl/Neo/Coconut; Formats: CD, digital download	—	—	
30	Released: June 26, 2015; Label: Coconut; Formats: CD	—	—	
"—" denotes a recording that did not chart or was not released in that territory.

=== Video albums ===
Title	Details
Bad Boys' Best 98	Released: November 9, 1998; Label: BMG Ariola München; Formats: VHS
1985–2005 Video Collection	Released: August 1, 2005; Label: Edel Germany GmbH; Formats: DVD
Bad Boys Best Videos	Released: September 28, 2007; Label: Sony BMG Music Entertainment GmbH; Formats: DVD
Live on TV	Released: September 21, 2012; Label: Coconut Music; Formats: DVD

== Singles ==
Title	Year	Peak chart positions								Album
Title	Year	GER	AUT	FIN	FRA	NLD	SWE	SWI	US	Album
"L.O.V.E. in My Car"	1984	—	—	—	—	—	—	—	—	Hot Girls, Bad Boys
"You're a Woman"	1985	8	1	4	47	30	6	2	—	Hot Girls, Bad Boys
"Pretty Young Girl"	1985	29	14	—	—	—	—	30	—	Hot Girls, Bad Boys
"Kisses and Tears (My One and Only)"	1986	22	—	11	—	—	—	26	—	Heart Beat
"Love Really Hurts Without You"	1986	—	—	—	—	—	—	—	—	Heart Beat
"I Wanna Hear Your Heartbeat (Sunday Girl)"	1986	14	—	17	—	—	—	21	—	Heart Beat
"Gimme Gimme Your Lovin' (Little Lady)"	1987	—	—	24	—	—	—	—	—	Love Is No Crime
"Come Back and Stay"	1987	18	—	14	—	—	—	—	—	Love Is No Crime
"Don't Walk Away Suzanne"	1988	44	—	23	—	—	—	—	—	My Blue World
"Lovers in the Sand"	1988	42	—	—	—	—	—	—	—	My Blue World
"A World Without You (Michelle)"	1988	17	—	—	—	—	—	—	—	My Blue World
"Hungry for Love"	1988	26	—	5	—	—	—	—	—	Bad Boys Best
"Lady in Black"	1989	16	—	5	—	—	—	—	—	The Fifth
"A Train to Nowhere"	1989	27	—	10	—	—	—	—	—	The Fifth
"How I Need You"	1990	33	—	10	—	—	—	—	—	Game of Love
"Queen of Hearts"	1990	28	—	2	—	—	—	—	—	Game of Love
"Jungle in My Heart"	1991	41	—	19	—	—	—	—	—	Game of Love
"House of Silence"	1991	—	—	4	—	—	—	—	—	House of Silence
"Save Your Love"	1992	—	—	2	—	—	—	—	81	Totally
"I Totally Miss You"	1992	—	—	1	—	—	—	—	—	Totally
"A Love Like This"	1993	—	—	19	—	—	—	—	—	Totally
"Kiss You All Over, Baby"	1993	—	—	14	—	—	—	—	—	Kiss
"Go Go (Love Overload)"	1993	—	—	7	—	—	—	—	—	To Blue Horizons
"Luv 4 U"	1994	—	—	19	—	—	—	—	—	To Blue Horizons
"What Else?"	1994	—	—	—	—	—	—	—	—	To Blue Horizons
"Hold You in My Arms"	1995	—	—	—	—	—	—	—	—	Bang Bang Bang
"Anywhere"	1996	—	—	—	—	—	—	—	—	Bang Bang Bang
"You're a Woman '98"	1998	52	—	4	—	—	—	—	—	Back
"The Turbo Megamix"	1998	—	—	9	—	—	—	—	—	Back
"From Heaven to Heartache"	1998	—	—	—	—	—	—	—	—	Back
"The Hit-Pack"	1999	—	—	—	—	—	—	—	—	...Continued
"I'll Be Good"	2000	—	—	—	—	—	—	—	—	Tonite
"Lover on the Line"	2003	72	—	—	—	—	—	—	—	Around the World
"Still in Love"	2008	—	—	—	—	—	—	—	—	Heart & Soul
"Queen of My Dreams"	2009	—	—	—	—	—	—	—	—	Heart & Soul
"Come Back and Stay Re-Recorded 2010"	2010	—	—	—	—	—	—	—	—	25 (The 25th Anniversary Album)
"You're a Woman 2015"	2015	—	—	—	—	—	—	—	—	30
"Queen of My Dreams (Recharged)"	2018	—	—	—	—	—	—	—	—	Heart & Soul (Recharged)
"With Our Love" (with Tom Hooker and Scarlett)	2020	—	—	—	—	—	—	—	—	Non-album single
"Killers"	2020	—	—	—	—	—	—	—	—	Tears Turning to Ice
"Tears Turning to Ice (Remix)"	2021	—	—	—	—	—	—	—	—	Tears Turning to Ice
"—" denotes a recording that did not chart or was not released in that territory.
