= Bad Boys Best =

1989 greatest hits album by Bad Boys Blue

Greatest hits album by Bad Boys Blue
- Released: February 1989
- Genre: Eurodisco
- Label: Coconut
- Producer: Tony Hendrik; Karin Hartmann

Bad Boys Blue chronology
My Blue World (1988)	Bad Boys Best (1989)	The Fifth (1989)

Singles from Bad Boys Best
- 1. "Hungry for Love" Released: December 1988

Bad Boys Best
Review scores
Source	Rating
AllMusic	4/5 stars

Bad Boys Best is a greatest hits album by Bad Boys Blue. It came out in 1989. The album contained a new song, "Hungry for Love", which was released as a single.

== Track listing ==
No.	Title	Length
1.	"You're a Woman"	3:59
2.	"I Wanna Hear Your Heartbeat (Sunday Girl)"	4:05
3.	"Love Really Hurts Without You"	3:46
4.	"Come Back and Stay"	4:06
5.	"Gimme Gimme Your Lovin' (Little Lady)"	4:00
6.	"Lovers in the Sand"	3:46
7.	"A World Without You (Michelle)"	3:38
8.	"L.O.V.E. in My Car"	4:33
9.	"Pretty Young Girl"	3:40
10.	"Kisses and Tears (My One and Only)"	3:58
11.	"Don't Walk Away, Suzanne"	3:48
12.	"Hungry for Love"	5:55

== Charts ==
Weekly chart performance for Bad Boys Best
Chart (1989)	Peak position
Finnish Albums (Suomen virallinen lista)	32
German Albums (Offizielle Top 100)	14

== Sales and certifications ==
Certifications for Bad Boys Best
Region	Certification	Certified units/sales
Finland (Musiikkituottajat)	Platinum	66,485
