= Kiss (Bad Boys Blue album) =

Studio album by Bad Boys Blue
- Released: 27 September 1993
- Genre: Synthpop
- Length: 43:45
- Label: Coconut Records; 74321 16396 2
- Producer: Tony Hendrik, Karin Hartmann

Bad Boys Blue chronology
Totally (1992)	Kiss (1993)	To Blue Horizons (1994)

Singles from Kiss
- 1. "Kiss You All Over, Baby" Released: 1993

Kiss is the ninth studio album by German band Bad Boys Blue. It was released on 27 September 1993 by Coconut Records. One single was also released. John McInerney performed "Kiss You All Over, Baby" which before had been sung by Trevor Taylor. The song "Save Your Love" from the previous album was performed here as "Aguarda Tu Amor" in Spanish. The song "Kisses And Tears" is taken from the second album.

This record was the last with Trevor Bannister. In 1993, Bad Boys Blue toured around Africa with singer Owen Standing who never was an official band member.

== Track listing ==
1. "Kiss You All Over, Baby" – 4:22
2. "Sooner or Later" – 3:42
3. "Kisses and Tears (My One and Only)" – 3:55
4. "The Woman I Love" – 3:35
5. "I Do It All for You, Baby" – 3:35
6. "I Live" – 4:06
7. "Heart of Midnight" – 3:50
8. "Where Have You Gone" – 3:30
9. "Aguarda Tu Amor (Save Your Love)" – 3:58
10. "I'm Still in Love" – 3:52
11. "I Totally Miss You (U.S. Remix)" – 4:50

== Personnel ==
Bad Boys Blue

- John McInerney
- Andrew Thomas
- Trevor Bannister

Lead Vocals – Andrew Thomas (tracks: 4), John McInerney (tracks: 1, 2, 7 to 11), Trevor Bannister (tracks: 5), Trevor Taylor (tracks: 3, 6)

Additional personnel

- Engineer – Gary Jones, Helmut Rüssmann
- Lyrics By – Andrew Thomas (tracks: 6), John McInerney (tracks: 6), Karin van Haaren (tracks: 1 to 5, 7 to 11), Manuel Perez-Leal (tracks: 9), Mary Applegate (tracks: 3), Trevor Taylor (tracks: 6)
- Music By – Karin van Haaren (tracks: 6), T. Hendrik
- Producers – Tony Hendrik and Karin Hartmann

== Charts ==
Weekly chart performance for Kiss
Chart (1993)	Peak position
Finnish Albums (Suomen virallinen lista)	32
