= Hungry for Love (Bad Boys Blue song) =

Single by Bad Boys Blue

from the album Bad Boys Best
- Released: January 1989 or December 1988
- Label: Coconut
- Songwriters: Tony Hendrik; Karin van Haaren
- Producers: Tony Hendrik; Karin Hartmann

Bad Boys Blue singles chronology
"A World Without You (Michelle)" (1988)	"Hungry for Love" (1989)	"Lady in Black" (1989)

Music video
- "Hungry for Love" on YouTube

"Hungry for Love" is a song by Bad Boys Blue. It was the only new track on their 1989 greatest-hits album Bad Boys Best and was released as its lead single, debuting at number 26 in West Germany for the week of January 30, 1989. It was also the last single from the group to feature ex-vocalist Trevor Taylor, who has left the previous year.

== Background ==
In 1988, Trevor Taylor left the group a year after being gradually demoted from his role of the lead singer. He was asked to rejoin the group the following year just for recording sessions for the "Hungry for Love" single that was to be featured on the group's first compilation album Bad Boys Best.

After Taylor's departure the vocalist position was permanently secured by John McInerney.

== Composition ==
The song was written by Tony Hendrik and Karin Hartmann (as Karin van Haaren) and produced by Hendrik and Hartmann.

== Charts ==
Weekly chart performance for "Hungry for Love"
Chart (1989)	Peak position
Finland (Suomen virallinen lista)	5
West Germany (GfK)	26
