= To Blue Horizons =

Studio album by Bad Boys Blue
- Released: 26 March 1994
- Recorded: 1993
- Genre: Synthpop, Eurodance
- Length: 40:11
- Label: Intercord INT 845.207
- Producer: Horst Schnebel, Rico Novarini

Bad Boys Blue chronology
Kiss (1993)	To Blue Horizons (1994)	Bang Bang Bang (1996)

Singles from To Blue Horizons
- 1. "Go Go (Love Overload)" Released: 1993; 2. "Luv 4 U" Released: 1994; 3. "What Else?" Released: 1994

To Blue Horizons is the tenth studio album by German band Bad Boys Blue. It was released on 26 March 1994 by Intercord. Three singles were also released. The record includes two international hits: "Go Go (Love Overload)" and "Luv 4 U".

== Background ==
On this record, the band left its long-time label Coconut Records and producers Tony Hendrik and Karin Hartmann. As Trevor Bannister retired from the band, Bad Boys Blue became a duo again. John McInerney performed ten songs, and Andrew Thomas one.

The US edition of this album includes two additional songs "Don't Be So Shy" and "Family Beat". These songs were later featured in the band's next album Bang Bang Bang.

== Track listing ==
1. "Luv 4 U (Radio Mix)" – 3:42
2. "Go Go (Love Overload)" – 3:45
3. "Take A Chance" – 3:58
4. "Is It You?" – 3:26
5. "What Else? (Radio Mix)" – 3:12
6. "Grand Illusion" – 3:42
7. "Prove Your Love" – 3:27
8. "One More Kiss" – 3:34
9. "It Was Only Love" – 3:41
10. "Say You'll Be Mine" – 3:44
11. "Love's Not Always Like Paradise" – 3:43

== Charts ==
Weekly chart performance for To Blue Horizons
Chart (1994)	Peak position
Finnish Albums (Suomen virallinen lista)	25
German Albums (GfK Entertainment charts)	83

== Personnel ==
Bad Boys Blue

- John McInerney – lead vocal (tracks: 1 to 9, 11)
- Andrew Thomas – rap parts (1, 3, 6), lead vocal (tracks: 10)

Additional personnel

- Arranged By [Additional] – Pit Schönpflug
- Bass – Michael Herzer
- Executive Producer – Holger Müller
- Guitar – Adax Dörsam, Olli Rosenberger
- Keyboards – Horst Schnebel, Pit Schönpflug, Thomas Wörner
- Producer – Horst Schnebel (tracks: 2 to 4, 6 to 11), Rico Novarini (tracks: 1 5)
- Recorded By, Arranged By, Mixed By – Horst Schnebel
- Vocals – Armin Ludäscher, Joana Terry, Joshi Dinier, Sandy Davis, Sheryl Hackett, Ute Berling
