= The Fifth (Bad Boys Blue album) =

Studio album by Bad Boys Blue
- Released: 12 October 1989
- Genre: Euro disco, synthpop, Hi-NRG
- Length: 38:27
- Label: Coconut Records 260 291
- Producer: Tony Hendrik, Karin Hartmann

Bad Boys Blue chronology
Bad Boys Best (1988)	The Fifth (1989)	Game of Love (1990)

Singles from The Fifth
- 1. "Lady in Black" Released: 1989; 2. "A Train to Nowhere" Released: 1989

The Fifth is the fifth studio album by German band Bad Boys Blue. The record was released on October 29, 1989, by Coconut Records.

== Background ==
The album includes two singles: "Lady in Black" and "A Train to Nowhere". Track "No regrets" was originally sung by Edith Piaf as "Non, je ne regrette rien" written by Charles Dumont.

All the songs were performed by John McInerney. Trevor Taylor left the band and was replaced by Trevor Bannister (born August 5, 1965, in Grimsby, England), whose function in the group was mainly to perform Trevor Taylor's hits in live shows. It is during Bannister's tenure with the band that Bad Boys Blue began widely touring in Eastern Europe—thus gaining much popularity there. The album was certified gold in Finland in 1990.

The name of the album is sometimes spelled as The 5th.

== Track listing ==
1. "Lady in Black" – 3:46
2. "Someone to Love" – 3:05
3. "A Train to Nowhere" – 3:53
4. "I'm Not a Fool" – 3:49
5. "No Regrets" – 4:45
6. "Where Are You Now" – 3:38
7. "Fly Away" – 3:44
8. "Love Me or Leave Me" – 3:54
9. "Show Me the Way" – 3:54
10. "A Train to Nowhere (Train Mix)" – 3:59

== Personnel ==
Bad Boys Blue

- John McInerney – lead vocal (all tracks)
- Andrew Thomas – rap parts (9)
- Trevor Bannister

Additional personnel

- All tracks written by T. Hendrik/K.van Haaren except 5 written by Charles Dumont/Irving Taylor & 3, 10 written by T. Hendrik/T. Hendrik, K.van Haaren
- Arranged by Hazel Stoner & Tony Hendrik, except 7, 9 arranged by Hans Steingen
- Additional arrangements and keyboards by Uwe Haselsteiner
- Produced by Tony Hendrik & Karin Hartmann
- Tracks 1 to 4 and 6 to 10 are written by T. Hendrik and K. van Haaren
- Track 5 is written by Charles Dumont and Irving Taylor

== Charts and certifications ==
Weekly chart performance for The Fifth
Chart (1990)	Peak position
Finnish Albums (Suomen virallinen lista)	2

Certifications for The Fifth
Region	Certification	Certified units/sales
Finland (Musiikkituottajat)	Gold	30,114
