= Game of Love (album) =

1990 studio album by Bad Boys Blue

Studio album by Bad Boys Blue
- Released: 22 October 1990
- Studio: Coconut (Hennef)
- Genre: Synth-pop
- Length: 37:37
- Label: Coconut
- Producer: Tony Hendrik; Karin van Haaren

Bad Boys Blue chronology
| The Fifth (1989) | Game of Love (1990) | House of Silence (1991) |

Singles from Game of Love
- 1. "How I Need You" Released: 9 April 1990; 2. "Queen of Hearts" Released: 1990; 3. "Jungle in My Heart" Released: January 1991

Game of Love is the sixth studio album by Bad Boys Blue, released on 22 October 1990 by Coconut Records. The record includes three singles: "How I Need You", "Queen of Hearts" and "Jungle in My Heart". John McInerney performed all the songs. The album was certified gold in Finland in 1991.

== Track listing ==
All tracks are written by Tony Hendrik and Karin van Haaren.

Game of Love – Standard edition
| No. | Title | Length |
|---|---|---|
| 1. | "Queen of Hearts" | 4:11 |
| 2. | "Jungle in My Heart" | 3:38 |
| 3. | "I Don't Know Her Name" | 3:23 |
| 4. | "Jenny, Come Home" | 3:49 |
| 5. | "Chains of Love" | 3:46 |
| 6. | "How I Need You" | 3:37 |
| 7. | "I Need a Woman" | 4:12 |
| 8. | "I Don't Wanna Lose You" | 3:13 |
| 9. | "I am Your Believer" | 3:32 |
| 10. | "Queen of Hearts (Remix)" | 4:16 |
| Total length: | | 37:37 |

== Personnel ==
Credits adapted from the album's liner notes.

Production

- Tony Hendrik – producer
- Karin van Haaren – producer
- Gary Jones – sound engineer, mixing
- Herman Schulte – photography
- Manfred Vormstein – art direction

== Charts ==
Weekly chart performance for Game of Love
| Chart (1990–1991) | Peak position |
|---|---|
| Finnish Albums (Suomen virallinen lista) | 7 |
| Hungarian Albums (MAHASZ) | 39 |

== Certifications and sales ==
Certifications and sales for Game of Love
| Region | Certification | Certified units/sales |
|---|---|---|
| Finland (Musiikkituottajat) | Gold | 32,682 |
