= Totally (album) =

Studio album by Bad Boys Blue
- Released: 26 October 1992
- Genre: Hi-NRG, synthpop
- Length: 39:42
- Label: Coconut Records; 74321 11676 2
- Producer: Tony Hendrik, Karin Hartmann

Bad Boys Blue chronology
House of Silence (1991)	Totally (1992)	Kiss (1993)

Singles from Totally
- 1. "I Totally Miss You" Released: 1992; 2. "Save Your Love" Released: 1992; 3. "A Love Like This" Released: 1993

Totally is the eight studio album by German band Bad Boys Blue. It was released on 26 October 1992 by Coconut Records. Three singles were also released. John McInerney performed nine songs, and Andrew Thomas one. The record includes two international hits: "I Totally Miss You" and "Save Your Love". The album reached #83 in German charts.

== Track listing ==
1. "Have You Ever Had a Love Like This" – 3:47
2. "I Totally Miss You" – 3:59
3. "What a Feeling" – 3:22
4. "Who's That Man?" – 3:51
5. "Warm and Tender Love" – 4:00
6. "Save Your Love" – 4:01
7. "Johnny" – 4:29
8. "I'm Never Gonna Fall in Love Again" – 3:43
9. "Rhythm of the Night" – 3:56
10. "I Totally Miss You (Re-Mix)" – 4:31

== Personnel ==
Bad Boys Blue

- John McInerney – lead vocal (1 2 3 4 6 7 8 9 10)
- Andrew Thomas – lead vocal (5)
- Trevor Bannister

Additional personnel

- Lyrics By – J. McInerney (tracks: 7), K. van Haaren (tracks: 1 to 4, 6 to 10)
- Music By – A. Strasser (tracks: 8), T. Hendrik (tracks: 1 to 4, 6 7 9 10)
- Photography By – Uwe Blum
- Producer – Tony Hendrik and Karin Hartmann

== Credits ==
- All tracks written by T. Hendrik and K. van Haaren except 5 written by B. Robinson and Irral I. Berger
- 7 written by T. Hendrik, K. van Haaren, and J. McInerney
- 8 written by A. Strasser and K. van Haaren.

== Charts ==
Weekly chart performance for Totally
Chart (1992)	Peak position
Finnish Albums (Suomen virallinen lista)	17
