= Hot Girls, Bad Boys =

Studio album by Bad Boys Blue
- Released: 28 August 1985
- Studio: Rüßmann, Hennef; some vocals recorded at Studio Weber
- Genre: Eurodisco; synth-pop
- Length: 42:27
- Label: Coconut; Ariola
- Producer: Tony Hendrik; Karin Hartmann

Bad Boys Blue chronology
| Hot Girls, Bad Boys (1985) | Heartbeat (1986) |

Singles from Hot Girls, Bad Boys
- 1. "L.O.V.E. in My Car" Released: 1984; 2. "You're a Woman" Released: June 7, 1985; 3. "Pretty Young Girl" Released: September 10, 1985

Professional ratings
Review scores
| Source | Rating |
|---|---|
| Sputnikmusic | 4/5 |

Hot Girls, Bad Boys is the debut studio album by German band Bad Boys Blue released on 28 August 1985 by Coconut Records. The album includes two international hit songs "You're a Woman" and "Pretty Young Girl". The record also released three singles. The debut single, "L.O.V.E. in My Car", failed to make an impression in the pop charts, but the follow-up "You're a Woman" was a success, reaching the top 10 in many European countries and peaking at No. 1 in Israel.

== Track listing ==
1. "You're a Woman" – 5:28
2. "I Live" – 4:52
3. "Pretty Young Girl" – 5:43
4. "L.O.V.E. in My Car" – 5:20
5. "Kiss You All Over, Baby" – 5:58
6. "Hot Girls - Bad Boys" – 4:09
7. "For Your Love" – 5:58
8. "People of the Night" – 5:00

== Personnel ==
Credits for Hot Girls, Bad Boys adapted from liner notes.

Bad Boys Blue

- Trevor Taylor – lead vocals and backing vocals (except track 4)
- Andrew Thomas – lead vocals and backing vocals (track 4)
- John McInerney – backing vocals

Additional personnel

- Claus-Robert Kruse – synthesizers
- Tony Hendrik – synthesizers and drum machine
- John Parsons – electric guitar
- Andreas Martin – backing vocals
- Wolfgang Remling – backing vocals

== Chart performance ==
| Chart (1985) | Peak position |
|---|---|
| Finnish Albums (Suomen virallinen lista) | 11 |
| German Albums (Offizielle Top 100) | 50 |
| Swedish Albums (Sverigetopplistan) | 30 |
| Swiss Albums (Schweizer Hitparade) | 9 |
