= Follow the Light (Bad Boys Blue album) =

Studio album by Bad Boys Blue
- Released: 27 September 1999
- Genres: Eurodance, synthpop
- Length: 59:28
- Label: Coconut Records 74321 70067 2
- Producers: Uwe Haselsteiner, Heiko Schneider, Andy Matern, Tony Hendrik, Karin Hartmann

Bad Boys Blue chronology
Bang Bang Bang (1996)	Follow the Light (1999)	Tonite (2000)

Singles from Follow the Light

Follow the Light is the twelfth studio album by German band Bad Boys Blue. It was released on 27 September 1999 by Coconut Records. There were no singles released for this record. The album is unusually long and features 16 tracks. John McInerney performed all the songs. The album scored #80 in German charts.

Tony Hendrik and Karin Hartmann were back writing and producing—along with Andy Matern.

== Track listing ==
1. "Follow the Light" – 3:34
2. "Thinking About You" – 3:25
3. "When I Kiss You" – 3:51
4. "I Can't Live" – 3:53
5. "Under the Boardwalk '99" – 3:16
6. "Back to the Future" – 3:53
7. "Listen to Your Heart" – 3:39
8. "Hungry for Love (Rap Version)'99" – 3:17
9. "Sweet Love" – 3:25
10. "Baby Blue '99" – 3:46
11. "Rhythm of Rain" – 3:59
12. "I'll Be Around" – 3:42
13. "Ride on a Star" – 3:23
14. "Love Is No Crime '99" – 4:03
15. "Have You Ever Had a Love Like This '99" – 3:32
16. "Back to the Future (Level 1 Remix)" – 4:11

== Personnel ==
Bad Boys Blue

- John McInerney – Lead vocal (all tracks)
- Andrew Thomas
- Mo Russel

Additional personnel

- Rap parts: Jojo Max (8)

== Credits ==
- All tracks written by T. Hendrik/K.van Haaren except 1 written by T. Hendrik/Worthy Davis; 2 written by Uwe Haselsteiner/Heiko Schneider; 3, 6, 16 written by Carsten Wegener; 5 written by Young/Resnick; 7, 9 written by Uwe Haselsteiner, Heiko Schneider/Heiko Schneider; 8 written by T. Hendrik/K. van Haaren & Jojo Max; 12 written by Andreas Matern/Worthy Davis & 13 written by T. Hendrik/R. Preuss
- Tracks 2, 7, 9 produced by Uwe Haselsteiner and Heiko Schneider at X-Talk Studio, Rüsselsheim
- Track 1 programmed and arranged by Tony Hendrik, Andy Matern and Christoph Schick, mixed by Andy Matern at Coconut Studio 2, produced by Hendrik/Hartmann.
- Tracks 3, 14, 15 programmed, arranged and mixed by Christoph Schick at Coconut Studio2. Produced by Hendrik/Hartmann, co-produced by Christoph Schick.
- Tracks 4, 10, 11, 13 programmed and arranged by Andy Matern and Christoph Schick, mixed by Andy Matern at Coconut Studio 2. Produced by Hendrik/Hartmann, co-produced by Matern/Schick.
- Tracks 5, 6, 8 programmed, arranged and mixed by Andy Matern at Coconut Studio 2. Produced by Hendrik/Hartmann, co-produced by Andy Matern.
- Tracks 12, 16 produced, programmed, arranged and mixed by Andy Matern at Andy's Studio.
- Leadvocals on Tracks 1, 3, 4, 6, 11, 12, 13, 16 recorded at Ton-Studio M. Dorth, Troisdorf.
