= House of Silence =

Studio album by Bad Boys Blue
- Released: 14 October 1991
- Genre: Synthpop, disco
- Length: 38:10
- Label: Coconut Records 262 136
- Producer: Tony Hendrik, Karin Hartmann

Bad Boys Blue chronology
Game of Love (1990)	House of Silence (1991)	Totally (1992)

Singles from House of Silence
- 1. "House of Silence" Released: 1991

House of Silence is the seventh studio album by German band Bad Boys Blue. It was released on 14 October 1991 by Coconut Records. John McInerney performed all the songs. The record includes one single—"House Of Silence". The album was certified gold in Finland in 1991.

== Track listing ==
1. "House of Silence" – 3:54
2. "Under the Boardwalk" – 3:32
3. "Train at Midnight" – 3:29
4. "Baby Blue" – 3:46
5. "Dancing With The Bad Boys" – 4:17
6. "Deep In My Emotion" – 3:43
7. "Tell It Everybody" – 3:18
8. "Gimme Back My Love" – 4:00
9. "When Our Love Was Young" – 3:43
10. "House of Silence (Haunted House Mix)" – 4:08

== Personnel ==
Bad Boys Blue

- John McInerney – lead vocal (all tracks)
- Andrew Thomas – rap parts (5, 7)
- Trevor Bannister

Additional personnel

- Lyrics By – A. Thomas (tracks: 5, 7), J. McInerney (tracks: 7), K. van Haaren (tracks: 1, 3 to 10)
- Music By – K. van Haaren (tracks: 5, 7), T. Hendrik (tracks: 1, 3 to 10)
- Photography By – Florian Seidel
- Producer – Tony Hendrik and Karin Hartmann
- Recorded By, Mixed By – Gary Jones

== Credits ==
- All tracks written by T. Hendrik/K.van Haaren except 2 written by Young/Resnick
- 5,7 written by T. Hendrik, K.van Haaren/K.van Haaren, A. Thomas
- 8 written by T. Hendrik/K.van Haaren, J. McInerney
- Keyboards by Uwe Haselsteiner and Peter Schmitz
- Guitars by John Parsons
- Produced by Tony Hendrik & Karin Hartmann
- Recorded and mixed by Gary Jones at Coconut Studio, Hennef, Germany

== Charts and certifications ==
Weekly chart performance for House of Silence
Chart (1991)	Peak position
Finnish Albums (Suomen virallinen lista)	2

Certifications for House of Silence
Region	Certification	Certified units/sales
Finland (Musiikkituottajat)	Gold	29,227
