= Trevor Taylor (singer) =

- Historical photo of Trevor Taylor

Background information
- Also known as: Supa T
- Born: Trevor Oliver Taylor; 11 January 1958; Montego Bay, Jamaica
- Died: 19 January 2008 (aged 50) Cologne, Germany
- Genres: Euro disco, reggae, Eurodance
- Occupations: Musician, singer, songwriter, composer
- Instruments: Vocal, bass guitar
- Years active: 1984—2008
- Labels: Coconut Records, Mercury Records, Simple Things Records

Trevor Oliver Taylor (11 January 1958 – 19 January 2008) was a Jamaican-German singer, musician, music producer, and songwriter. He was best known as the original lead singer of the German band Bad Boys Blue. In later years, he adopted the stage name Supa T.

== Early years ==
Trevor Taylor was born in 1958 in Montego Bay, Jamaica. At the age of 14, Taylor visited England for the first time. Besides music, young Taylor was interested in cooking, power lifting, and football. Taylor was a true rastaman, and his idol was Bob Marley. At the beginning of his career, Taylor played bass guitar in the British reggae band UB40 and also was a singer in little-known groups in Seychelles. In 1978, Taylor worked as a chef in a restaurant "Holiday Inn" in Birmingham, and then in Cologne restaurant "Stummel".

== Bad Boys Blue ==
In 1984, Trevor Taylor joined the new group Bad Boys Blue, where he was selected as the lead vocalist. He sang the leads on the 1985 hit song "You're a Woman". It was a real success for the band and it instantly reached Top 10 in many European music charts. In Germany, the single peaked at No. 8 and it did not leave the German Top 20 for four months. The same year, Bad Boys Blue released their first studio album, Hot Girls, Bad Boys, on which Trevor Taylor sang on all songs (except "L.O.V.E. in My Car"), just as he did on the band's second album, Heartbeat, which was released in 1986.

In 1987, while recording the single "Come Back And Stay", producers Tony Hendrik and Karin van Haaren decided to change the lead singer, and John McInerney became the permanent front person. These changes led to tensions within the group, so Taylor gradually phased out his presence and in 1989 left the team for good to pursue a solo career.

== After leaving Bad Boys Blue ==
After leaving the group, Taylor tried to act in films and participated in various musical projects, from trance to reggae. In 1990, the reggae project Street Noise released the single "Our Problem", where Trevor Taylor was the leading vocalist. In 1991, Taylor was a member of the band Temper Temper as a guitarist. For several years Taylor was a producer and vocalist in the German reggae band Umoya, which released three albums and six singles.

Since 1995, under the pseudonym Supa T, Taylor began recording with the band The Party Animals, releasing singles "My Dog", "Gotta Jump", "Be True", and "Love and Respect". The latter was the hit of the year in Spain and held top positions in the Spanish charts for a long time. All these compositions subsequently were featured in his first solo album, Reggae in the Pop House & Soul, released in 1998 by Vale Music. That same year, Taylor participated in the recording of the single "Harddrummer" by Chocolate Milk.

He later recorded singles for Mondo Club: a cover version of "Don't Worry, Be Happy", and "Sex Up My Life", which became the soundtrack for the television series "Heiße Tage – Wilde Nächte". In his later years, Taylor performed a lot with reggae groups Umoya and The Reggae Cracks. He also planned to release his second solo album, Second Life.

Trevor Taylor, aged 50, died of a heart attack at a hospital in Cologne. His second solo album is still officially unreleased.

== Discography ==
=== Singles ===
Year	Name	Performer/Group
1985	You're a Woman	Bad Boys Blue
1985	Pretty Young Girl	Bad Boys Blue
1986	Kisses and Tears (My One and Only)	Bad Boys Blue
1986	Love Really Hurts Without You	Bad Boys Blue
1986	I Wanna Hear Your Heartbeat (Sunday Girl)	Bad Boys Blue
1987	Gimme Gimme Your Lovin' (Little Lady)	Bad Boys Blue
1990	Our Problem	Street Noise (feat. Trevor Taylor)
1992	Hey You	Umoya
1993	Hey You (Club Remixes)	Umoya
1993	The Children	Umoya
1994	Hey See De Rastaman	Umoya
1994	Hey See De Rastaman (Dance Remixes)	Umoya
1994	Song For Ruanda	Cologne Ruanda Project
1995	My Dog (Is Better Than Your Dog)	Supa T and the Party Animals
1996	Love and Respect	Supa T and the Party Animals
1997	Gotta Jump	Supa T and the Party Animals
1998	Be True	Supa T and the Party Animals
1998	Harddrummer (Drivin' Me Crazy)	Chocolate Milk
2001	Ha Deng /Tribal Nation	Avancada
2001	I Like to Move It	Bang Gang
2001	Sex Up My Life (The Pussy Song)	Mondo Club
2001	Don't Worry, Be Happy	Mondo Club
2010	Ragga Ragga (digital release)	Blunt Factory (feat. Trevor Taylor)

=== Albums ===
Year	Name	Performer/Group
1985	Hot Girls, Bad Boys	Bad Boys Blue
1986	Heart Beat	Bad Boys Blue
1987	Love Is No Crime	Bad Boys Blue
1988	My Blue World	Bad Boys Blue
1993	Overdue	Umoya
1998	Reggae in the Pop House & Soul	Supa T and the Party Animals
1999	Mixed Mode (promo)	Umoya
2004	Two Decades	Umoya
2006	Many Ways	Kuebert
2007	Second Life (unreleased)	Supa T and the Reggae Cracks
