= Show Me the Way to Your Heart =

Show Me the Way to Your Heart may refer to:

- "Show Me (The Way to Your Heart)", a song by Bad Boys Blue from the album Heart & Soul
- "Show Me the Way to Your Heart", a song by Joe "Bean" Esposito from the album Treated and Released
- "Show Me the Way to Your Heart", a song by Ruben and the Jets from the album For Real!
- "Show Me the Way to Your Heart", a song by Sara Evans from the album Born to Fly
- "Show Me the Way to Your Heart", a song by Scott Grimes from the self-titled album Scott Grimes
