= Around the World (Bad Boys Blue album) =

Studio album by Bad Boys Blue
- Released: 4 August 2003
- Genre: Eurodance, synthpop
- Length: 53:32
- Label: Koch Universal 06024 9865360
- Producer: David Brandes

Bad Boys Blue chronology
Tonite (2000)	Around the World (2003)	Heart & Soul (2008)

Singles from Around the World
- 1. "Lover on the Line" Released: 2003

Around the World is the fourteenth studio album by German band Bad Boys Blue. It was released on 4 August 2003 by Koch Universal. There was also one single released for this record, "Lover on the Line". John McInerney performed all the songs.

The group became a duo again and left Coconut Records. This album is the last one where John McInerney and Andrew Thomas perform together.

== Track listing ==
1. "Around The World" – 3:52
2. "Cold As Ice" – 4:18
3. "Baby Come Home" – 3:08
4. "Think About You" – 4:15
5. "Lover On The Line" – 3:49
6. "A Bridge Of Heartaches" – 3:59
7. "Join The Bad Boys Blue" – 3:02
8. "Babe" – 3:48
9. "Heaven Or Hell" – 3:58
10. "I'm Your Lover" – 3:38
11. "I'm Living For Your Love" – 3:45
12. "Only One Breath Away" – 3:58
13. "Around The World (Remix)" – 3:45
14. "Lover On The Line (Extended Version)" – 7:17

== Charts ==
Weekly chart performance for Around the World
Chart (1985)	Peak position
Finnish Albums (Suomen virallinen lista)	27
German Albums (Offizielle Top 100)	43

== Personnel ==
Bad Boys Blue

- John McInerney – Lead vocal (all tracks)
- Andrew Thomas – Rap parts (9)

Additional personnel

- Arranged by David Brandes (tracks: 2), Domenico Labarile (tracks: 1 2 6 7 9 10 11 13), Domenico Livarano (tracks: 5 12 14), Hans Steingen (tracks: 8), Juergen Fritz (tracks: 1 3 4)
- Backing vocals – David Brandes, Lydia Madajewski
- Lyrics by Chris Norman (tracks: 9), David Brandes (tracks: 6), John McInerney (tracks: 3 6), John O' Flynn (tracks: 1 to 5, 7 to 14)
- Mixed by Gary Jones (tracks: 1 to 5, 7 to 14), Milan Saje (tracks: 6)
- Music by David Brandes, Jane Tempest
- Photography by Karsten Koch
- Producer – David Brandes
- Recorded by Alwin Groll, David Brandes
