= World Without You (disambiguation) =

"World Without You" is a single by Belinda Carlisle from her 1988 album Heaven on Earth.

World Without You may also refer to:

- "A World Without You" (Michelle), a song by Bad Boys Blue from their 1988 album My Blue World
- "World Without You" (Beth Hart song), a song by Beth Hart from her 2003 album Leave the Light On
- "World Without You" (Ivy song), a song by American indie pop band Ivy from their 2011 album All Hours
- "A World Without You", a song by Belle and Sebastian from the 2022 album A Bit of Previous
- "A World Without You", a song by Marty Stuart from the 2010 album Ghost Train: The Studio B Sessions

== See also ==
- "No World Without You", a song by Kylie Minogue from her 1991 album Let's Get to It
