= Love Is No Crime =

Studio album by Bad Boys Blue
- Released: 12 October 1987
- Genre: Euro disco; synth-pop
- Length: 46:26
- Label: Coconut
- Producer: Tony Hendrik; Karin Hartmann

Bad Boys Blue chronology
Heart Beat (1986)	Love Is No Crime (1987)	My Blue World (1988)

Singles from Love Is No Crime
- 1. "Gimme Gimme Your Lovin' (Little Lady)" Released: 1987; 2. "Come Back and Stay" Released: 1987

Love Is No Crime is the third studio album by German band Bad Boys Blue. It was released on 12 October 1987 by Coconut Records. The album includes one international hit, "Come Back and Stay". Two singles were released from the record: "Come Back and Stay" and "Gimme Gimme Your Lovin' (Little Lady)".

Hans-Jürgen Fritz, who used to play keyboards for the German prog band Triumvirat, makes a comeback appearance on keyboards and drum programming. He also co-wrote 3 songs and helped on the arrangements.

== Track listing ==
1. "Come Back and Stay" – 7:35
2. "If You Call on Me" – 3:32
3. "Victim of Your Love" – 4:29
4. "Love Is No Crime" – 3:35
5. "Gimme Gimme Your Lovin' (Little Lady)" – 3:49
6. "I Remember Mary" – 4:57
7. "Charlene" – 4:26
8. "Inside of Me" – 4:34
9. "Why (Misty Eyes)" – 4:57
10. "Kiss You All Over, Baby (New Version)" – 4:12

== Personnel ==
Bad Boys Blue

- Trevor Taylor – lead vocals (3, 5, 7, 8, 9, 10)
- John McInerney – lead vocals (1, 2, 4, 6)
- Andrew Thomas – backing vocals

Additional personnel

- Hans-Jürgen Fritz – keyboards, drum programming
- Günter Lammers – keyboards
- John Parsons – guitars
- Tony Hendrik – drum programming

== Credits ==
- All tracks written by Tony Hendrik and Karin van Haaren except 3 and 8 written by Hans-Jürgen Fritz and Trevor Taylor
- 7 and 10 written by Tony Hendrik, Mary Applegate, Karin van Haaren
- 9 written by Jürgen Fritz and K.-D. Gebauer
- All songs arranged by Tony Hendrik, Jürgen Fritz, and Günther Lammers
- Recorded and mixed at Coconut Studios, Hennef, Germany.
- Produced by Tony Hendrik and Karin Hartmann.

== Charts ==
Weekly chart performance for Love Is No Crime
Chart (1987)	Peak position
Finnish Albums (Suomen virallinen lista)	11
