= My Blue World =

Studio album by Bad Boys Blue
- Released: 10 October 1988
- Genre: Euro disco, synthpop, Hi-NRG
- Length: 40:35
- Label: Coconut Records 259 389
- Producer: Tony Hendrik, Karin Hartmann

Bad Boys Blue chronology
Love Is No Crime (1987)	My Blue World (1988)	Bad Boys Best (1989)

Singles from My Blue World
- 1. "Don't Walk Away Susanne" Released: 1988; 2. "Lovers in the Sand" Released: 1988; 3. "A World Without You >Michelle<" Released: 1988

My Blue World is the fourth studio album by German band Bad Boys Blue. It was released on 10 October 1988 by Coconut Records. The record includes three singles: "A World Without You (Michelle)", "Don't Walk Away, Susanne", and "Lovers in the Sand".

== Background ==
All the songs were performed by Trevor Taylor and John McInerney. Starting from this album, John McInerney has secured himself a position as the band's new leader and vocalist. My Blue World album was the last one with Taylor. Track "Till the End of Time" was at the beginning designed to be a title song for this album, but producers changed their mind, and the record was released under the name My Blue World.

== Track listing ==
1. "A World Without You (Michelle) (Radio Edit)" – 3:32
2. "Don't Leave Me Now" – 6:10
3. "Bad Reputation" – 3:36
4. "Don't Walk Away Suzanne" – 3:50
5. "Love Don't Come Easy" – 3:42
6. "Lovers in the Sand" – 3:46
7. "Till the End of Time" – 4:22
8. "Lonely Weekend" – 3:38
9. "Rain in My Heart" – 4:12
10. "A World Without You (Michelle) (Classical Mix)" – 3:30

== Personnel ==
Bad Boys Blue

- John McInerney – lead vocal (1, 2, 4, 6, 7, 8, 9, 10)
- Trevor Taylor – lead vocal (3, 5)
- Andrew Thomas

Additional personnel

All tracks written by T. Hendrik/K.van Haaren except 5 written by T. Taylor, Hans Steingen/T. Taylor
Produced by Tony Hendrik and Karin Hartmann; 1 and 10 produced by Tony Hendrik
Arranged by Tony Hendrik, Klaus-D. Gebauer, Claus-Robert Kruse, Hans-Jürgen Fritz, Günther Lammers
Recorded and mixed by Gary Jones, Klaus-D. Gebauer, Claus-Robert Kruse, Günther Kasper, Helmuth Rüssmann and Andreas Martin at Coconut Studio, Hennef; Sound Studio "N", Köln; Cool Cat Studio, Hamburg; Tonstudio Rüssmann, Hennef.

== Charts ==
Weekly chart performance for My Blue World
Chart (1989)	Peak position
Finnish Albums (Suomen virallinen lista)	17
German Albums (GfK Entertainment charts)	48
