= Tonite (Bad Boys Blue album) =

Studio album by Bad Boys Blue
- Released: 24 July 2000
- Genre: Disco, Eurodance, synthpop
- Length: 51:02
- Label: Coconut Records 74321 77969 2
- Producer: Uwe Haselsteiner, Heiko Schneider, Andy Matern, K.-D. Gebauer, Tony Hendrik, Karin Hartmann

Bad Boys Blue chronology
Follow the Light (1999)	Tonite (2000)	Around the World (2003)

Singles from Tonite
- 1. "I'll Be Good" Released: 2000

Tonite is the thirteenth studio album by German band Bad Boys Blue. It was released on 24 July 2000 by Coconut Records. There was one single released for this record, "I'll Be Good". John McInerney performed all the songs. Rap parts were performed by Kevin McCoy. Again, Tony Hendrik and Karin Hartmann were back writing and producing.

== Track listing ==
1. "I'll Be Good" – 3:54
2. "Do What You Do" – 3:32
3. "S.O.S. For Love" – 3:36
4. "Waiting For Tonight" – 3:35
5. "Somewhere In My Heart" – 3:50
6. "I Wanna Fly" – 3:50
7. "Take A Piece Of My Heart" – 3:49
8. "You Take Me To The Light" – 3:34
9. "Close Your Eyes" – 3:22
10. "Heaven Must Be Missing You" – 3:18
11. "You're The Reason" – 3:51
12. "Love Really Hurts Without You" – 3:59
13. "S.O.S. For Love (Rap Edit)" – 3:07
14. "Do What You Do (Rap Edit)" – 3:40

== Personnel ==
Bad Boys Blue

- John McInerney – Lead vocal (all tracks)
- Kevin McCoy – Rap parts (13, 14)
- Andrew Thomas

Additional personnel

- Thomas Sassenbach – Art Direction
- Manfred Esser – Photography
