= Bad Boys Blue (album) =

Studio album by Bad Boys Blue
- Released: 1993
- Genre: Eurodance, synthpop
- Length: 38:52
- Label: Zoo Entertainment
- Producer: Tony Hendrik & Karin Hartmann

Bad Boys Blue chronology
Dancing with the Bad Boys Blue (1993)	Bad Boys Blue (1993)	You're a Woman (1994)

Professional ratings
Review scores
Source	Rating
Allmusic	link

Bad Boys Blue is the 1993 self-titled album from German Eurodance group Bad Boys Blue.

== Track listing ==
1. "Save Your Love" - 3:58
2. "I Totally Miss You" - 3:57
3. "Have You Ever Had A Love Like This" - 3:35
4. "Come Back And Stay" - 3:58
5. "Show Me The Way" - 3:53
6. "A Train To Nowhere" - 3:51
7. "Under The Boardwalk" - 3:30
8. "Johnny" - 4:25
9. "I'm Never Gonna Fall In Love Again" - 3:50
10. "Rhythm Of The Night" - 3:55
