= Bang Bang Bang (Bad Boys Blue album) =

Studio album by Bad Boys Blue
- Released: 20 June 1996
- Recorded: 1995
- Genre: Disco, Eurodance
- Length: 55:38
- Label: Intercord INT 845.262
- Producer: Felix J. Gauder, Brahm Heidl, Wolli Fredde, The Wild Boys, Rico Novarini, Horst Schnebel

Bad Boys Blue chronology
To Blue Horizons (1994)	Bang Bang Bang (1996)	Follow the Light (1999)

Singles from Bang Bang Bang
- 1. "Hold You in My Arms" Released: 1995; 2. "Anywhere" Released: 1996

Bang Bang Bang is the eleventh studio album by German band Bad Boys Blue. It was released on 20 June 1996 by Intercord. The record includes two singles: "Hold You in My Arms" and "Anywhere". Bonus tracks "Don’t Be So Shy" and "Family Beat" were featured in the US edition of the previous album, To Blue Horizons.

== Background ==
The band became a trio again as Irmo Russel (born 15 March 1956 in Aruba, Caribbean Sea) joined the group in 1995, who in addition to stepping into Bannister's shoes was instrumental in revitalizing the group's creative potential, by becoming a composer, video director, and occasionally assuming the role of lead singer on some of the tracks.

== Track listing ==
1. "Hold You In My Arms" – 3:53
2. "Bang! Bang! Bang!" – 3:18
3. "Anywhere" – 3:34
4. "Keep It In Your Soul" – 3:48
5. "Fly Away" – 3:56
6. "U'n'I" – 3:58
7. "Hold Me Now" – 3:41
8. "Little Girl" – 3:57
9. "Anyway Forever" – 3:33
10. "When I See You Smile" – 3:21
11. "Hold You In My Arms (Extended Version)" – 5:26
12. "Little Girl (Extended Version)" – 5:11
13. "Don't Be So Shy" – 3:25 Bonus Track
14. "Family Beat" – 3:55 Bonus Track

== Personnel ==
Bad Boys Blue

- John McInerney – Lead Vocal (tracks: 1 to 5, 7, 8, 10 to 14)
- Mo Russel – Lead Vocal (tracks: 2, 3, 5, 6, 9)
- Andrew Thomas – Rap Parts (tracks: 2, 9)

Additional personnel

- Executive Producer – Holger Müller, Jürgen Backes
- Additional Vocals – Grant Stevens (tracks: 3 5 7 9), Cordula Leisse (tracks: 3 5 7 9)
