= Heartbeat (Bad Boys Blue album) =

Heart Beat

Studio album by Bad Boys Blue
- Released: 19 October 1986
- Studio: Studio Rüssmann
- Genre: Euro disco; synth-pop
- Length: 44:21
- Label: Coconut
- Producer: Tony Hendrik; Karin Hartmann

Bad Boys Blue chronology
Hot Girls, Bad Boys (1985)	Heart Beat (1986)	Love Is No Crime (1987)

Singles from Heartbeat
- 1. "Kisses and Tears (My One and Only)" Released: 1986; 2. "Love Really Hurts Without You" Released: 1986; 3. "I Wanna Hear Your Heartbeat (Sunday Girl)" Released: 1986

Professional ratings
Review scores
Source	Rating
Sputnikmusic	4.3/5

Heart Beat is the second studio album by German band Bad Boys Blue released on 19 October 1986 by Coconut Records. The album includes two international hits: "I Wanna Hear Your Heartbeat (Sunday Girl)" and "Kisses and Tears (My One and Only)". Three singles were released from the record. Sometimes the name of the album is spelled as Heartbeat.

Hans-Jürgen Fritz, who once played keyboards for the german prog band Triumvirat, plays synthesizers on the album, he also wrote and composed one song and did the arrangements on all songs with Tony Hendrik.

== Track listing ==
1. "I Wanna Hear Your Heartbeat (Sunday Girl)" – 3:50
2. "Mon Amie" – 4:35
3. "One Night In Heaven" – 4:45
4. "Baby I Love You" – 4:05 (Jeff Barry, Ellie Greenwich, Phil Spector)
5. "Kisses & Tears (My One and Only)" – 3:58
6. "Rainy Friday" – 4:35
7. "Lady Blue" – 4:29
8. "Love Really Hurts Without You" – 3:44
9. "Blue Moon" – 4:32
10. "Dance the Night Away" – 4:20

== Personnel ==
Bad Boys Blue

- Trevor Taylor – lead vocals (all tracks)
- Andrew Thomas – lead vocals and backing vocals
- John McInerney – lead vocals and backing vocals

Additional personnel

- Hans-Jürgen Fritz – synthesizers
- Günter Lammers – synthesizers
- John Parsons – electric guitar
- Tony Hendrik – drum machine

== Credits ==
- All tracks written by T. Hendrik and K. van Haaren except 3 written by H.-J. Fritz and 4 written by Spector, Greenwich, and Berry
- 5 written by T. Hendrik, K. van Haaren, and M. Applegate
- 8 written by Findon and Charles
- Recorded and mixed at Studio Rüssmann, Hennef, Germany.
- All songs arranged by T. Hendrik and H.-J. Fritz
- Produced by Tony Hendrik and Karin Hartmann
