= Lady in Black (Bad Boys Blue song) =

1989 single by Bad Boys Blue

Single by Bad Boys Blue

from the album The Fifth
- B-side: "Lady in Black (Instrumental)"
- Released: 24 July 1989
- Length: 3:45
- Label: Coconut
- Songwriter(s): Tony Hendrik; Karin van Haaren
- Producer(s): Tony Hendrik; Karin Hartmann

Bad Boys Blue singles chronology
"Hungry for Love" (1988)	"Lady in Black" (1989)	"A Train to Nowhere" (1989)

"Lady in Black" is a song by Bad Boys Blue, released in July 1989 as the lead single from their fifth studio album, The Fifth (1989).

== Composition ==
The song was written by Tony Hendrik and Karin Hartmann (as Karin van Haaren) and produced by Tony Hendrik and Karin Hartmann.

== Track listing and formats ==
- European 7-inch single

A. "Lady in Black" – 3:45
B. "Lady in Black" (Instrumental) – 3:45

- European 12-inch maxi-single

A. "Lady in Black" (Shakespearean Mix) – 6:08
B1. "Lady in Black" (Radio Edit) – 3:45
B2. "Lady in Black" (Instrumental) – 3:45

- German CD maxi-single
1. "Lady in Black" (Shakespearean Mix) – 6:09
2. "Don't Leave Me Now" – 6:12
3. "Lady in Black" (Radio Edit) – 3:48
4. "Lady In Black" (Instrumental) – 3:48

== Charts ==
Weekly chart performance for "Lady in Black"
Chart (1989)	Peak position
Finland (Suomen virallinen lista)	5
West Germany (GfK)	16
