= Ute Berling =

German singer

- Born: 1957 (age 67–68); Heidelberg, West Germany
- Genres: Pop rock, schlager, pop, electronic
- Occupation: Singer
- Instruments: Guitar; vocals
- Years active: 1976–1986
- Labels: M Records, M Music, CBS, Mercury, Coconut

Ute Berling (born 1957 in Heidelberg, West Germany) is a German singer.

== Life and career ==
Ute Berling was born in Heidelberg, West Germany. She appeared under a pseudonym and created German-language songs, as well as German-language cover versions of foreign hits. Berling appeared on the ARD television program Musikladen in 1978 and on the ZDF television program Disco in 1980 and on the ZDF-Hitparade in 1981. In 1981, with a German-language cover version of the song Bette Davis Eyes, Als ob sie Bette Davis wär, she ranked at number 21 in the German music charts for one week.

== Singles ==
- 1976: Einmal mußt du dich entscheiden / Leben, das heißt lieben – M Records
- 1977: Kasimir, der Elternschreck / Samstagabend in der Großstadt – M Records
- 1978: My Baby Blue (German-language cover version of My Baby Blue from Michel Costa) / Ich will frei sein, ich will leben – M Music
- 1979: Spiel’ dich nicht auf / Wenn du die Tür schließt – M Music
- 1979: Okay, wir haben Spaß gehabt / Denn sie will nicht, daß du gehst – M Music
- 1980: Amerika (German-language cover version of America from Gianna Nannini) / Spiel dich nicht auf – M Music
- 1981: Als ob sie Bette Davis wär (German-language cover version of Bette Davis Eyes) / Der Himmel macht zu – M Music
- 1982: Lady Rock’n’Roll / Kalter Morgen – M Music
- 1983: Kinder im All / Computerspiele – Mercury
- 1986: Alles, was ich will, bist du (German-language cover version of Saving All My Love for You from Marilyn McCoo and Billy Davis Jr.) / Himmel und Hölle – Coconut
- 1986: Ich will mit dir geh’n (German-language cover version of Take My Breath Away from Berlin) / Herz an Herz – Coconut
