= Come Back and Stay (Bad Boys Blue song) =

Single by Bad Boys Blue

from the album Love Is No Crime
- Released: 1987
- Label: Coconut
- Songwriters: Tony Hendrik; Karin van Haaren
- Producers: Tony Hendrik; Karin Hartmann

Bad Boys Blue singles chronology
"Gimme Gimme Your Lovin' (Little Lady)" (1987)	"Come Back and Stay" (1987)	"Don't Walk Away Suzanne" (1988)

Music video
- "Come Back and Stay" on YouTube

"Come Back and Stay" is a song by Bad Boys Blue from their third studio album Love Is No Crime. Released as a single in late 1987, it peaked at number 18 in West Germany for two weeks. It was the first single by the group to feature John McInerney on lead vocals. Female vocals were performed by Lyane Leigh.

== Composition ==
The song was written and produced by Tony Hendrik and Karin Hartmann (as Karin van Haaren).

== Charts ==
Weekly chart performance for "Come Back and Stay"
Chart (1987)	Peak position
Finland (Suomen virallinen lista)	14
West Germany (GfK)	18
