= Heart & Soul (Bad Boys Blue album) =

Studio album by Bad Boys Blue
- Released: 13 June 2008
- Genres: Eurodance, synthpop
- Length: 66:35
- Label: Spectre Media 1075727
- Producers: Johann Perrier & John McInerney

Bad Boys Blue chronology
Around the World (2003)	Heart & Soul (2008)

Singles from Heart & Soul
- 1. "Still in Love" Released: 2008; 2. "Queen of My Dreams" Released: 2009

Heart & Soul is the fifteenth studio album by German band Bad Boys Blue. It was released on 13 June 2008 by Spectre Media. There were two single released for this record: "Still in Love" and "Queen of My Dreams".

== Background ==
The second single "Queen of My Dreams" peaked at No. 17 on the German dance chart. John McInerney performed all the songs. Heart and Soul is largely devoted to Russia—two compositions are associated with this country: "Russia in My Eyes" and "Those Were the Days", which is a cover version of a classic Russian song with the same name.

== Track listing ==
1. "Still in Love" – 3:12
2. "In His Heart, In His Soul" – 3:26
3. "Matador" – 3:00
4. "Queen of My Dreams" – 3:26
5. "I Don't Wanna Know" – 3:35
6. "Make My Dreams Come True" – 3:18
7. "You and I" – 3:17
8. "Tonight Is the Night" – 3:13
9. "Sometimes" – 3:45
10. "Show Me (The Way to Your Heart)" – 3:43
11. "Hold Me in the Night" – 3:12
12. "Pictures of You" – 3:15
13. "Russia in My Eyes" – 3:17
14. "Those Were the Days" – 4:17

Bonus tracks

1. "Still in Love (Almighty-U4IC Exclusive Vox Remix)" – 7:27
2. "In His Heart, In His Soul (Extended Mix)" – 5:45
3. "Queen of My Dreams (Extended Mix)" – 5:30

== Personnel ==
Bad Boys Blue

- John McInerney – Lead vocal (all tracks)
- Carlos Ferreira

Additional personnel

Executive producers of "Heart & Soul": Johann Perrier & John McInerney.
Executive co-producer: Antoine Blanc.
Recorded between November 2006 and September 2007 by Johann Perrier/Antoine Blanc @ Modern Romantics Studios [Bougival, France] & by Paweł Marciniak @ Toya Sound Studios [Łódź, Poland].
Mixed between October and December 2007 by Johann Perrier @ Modern Romantics Studios [Bougival, France]. Mastered in January 2008 by Johann Perrier @ Modern Romantics Studios [Bougival, France].
All backing vocals performed by Carlos Ferriera/Sylvia McInerney/Edith Miracle & Antoine Blanc except track 13 performed by Antoine Blanc/Johann Perrier.
All keyboards, programming, bass & additional instruments performed by Johann Perrier/Antoine Blanc.
All guitars performed by Antoine Blanc/Clement Duval.
Accordion performed by Tonio Mattias.
All tracks published by Robinsong Music/Peer Music except track 14 published by Apple Records.
