= A World Without You (Michelle) =

Single by Bad Boys Blue

from the album My Blue World
- Released: 1988
- Label: Coconut
- Songwriters: Tony Hendrik; Karin van Haaren
- Producers: Tony Hendrik; Karin Hartmann

Bad Boys Blue singles chronology
| "Lovers in the Sand" (1988) | "A World Without You (Michelle)" (1988) | "Hungry for Love" (1989) |

Music video
- "A World Without You (Michelle)" on YouTube

"A World Without You (Michelle)" is a song by Bad Boys Blue from their fourth studio album My Blue World. Released as a single in late 1988, it peaked at number 17 in West Germany for two weeks in November.

== Composition ==
The song was written and produced by Tony Hendrik and Karin Hartmann (as Karin van Haaren).

== Charts ==
Weekly chart performance for "A World Without You (Michelle)"
| Chart (1988) | Peak position |
|---|---|
| West Germany (GfK) | 18 |
