= Kisses and Tears (My One and Only) =

1986 single by Bad Boys Blue

Single by Bad Boys Blue

from the album Heartbeat
- B-side: "Sentimental" (instrumental)
- Released: 1986
- Genre: Eurodisco
- Length: 3:58
- Label: Coconut
- Songwriters: Tony Hendrik; Karin van Haaren; Mary Susan Applegate
- Producers: Tony Hendrik; Karin van Haaren

Bad Boys Blue singles chronology
"Pretty Young Girl" (1985)	"Kisses and Tears (My One and Only)" (1986)	"Love Really Hurts Without You" (1986)

Music video
- "Kisses and Tears (My One and Only)" on YouTube

"Kisses and Tears (My One and Only)" is a song by Bad Boys Blue, released in 1986 as the lead single from the second studio album, Heartbeat (1986). It reached number 22 in West Germany and number 26 in Switzerland.

== Track listings ==
- European 7-inch single

A. "Kisses and Tears (My One and Only)" – 3:58
B. "Sentimental" (instrumental) – 3:58

- European 12-inch maxi-single

A. "Kisses and Tears (My One and Only)" – 5:39
B. "Sentimental" (instrumental) – 3:58

== Charts ==
Weekly chart performance for "Kisses and Tears (My One and Only)"
Chart (1986)	Peak position
Finland (Suomen virallinen lista)	11
Switzerland (Schweizer Hitparade)	26
West Germany (GfK)	22
