= I Wanna Hear Your Heartbeat (Sunday Girl) =

Single by Bad Boys Blue

from the album Heartbeat
- Released: 1986
- Label: Coconut
- Songwriters: Tony Hendrik; Karin van Haaren
- Producers: Tony Hendrik; Karin Hartmann

Bad Boys Blue singles chronology
"Love Really Hurts Without You" (1986)	"I Wanna Hear Your Heartbeat (Sunday Girl)" (1986)	"Gimme Gimme Your Lovin' (Little Lady)" (1987)

Music video
- "I Wanna Hear Your Heartbeat (Sunday Girl)" on YouTube

"I Wanna Hear Your Heartbeat (Sunday Girl)" is a song by Bad Boys Blue from their second studio album Heartbeat. Released as a single in late 1986, it reached number 14 in West Germany and number 21 in Switzerland.

== Composition ==
The song was written and produced by Tony Hendrik and Karin Hartmann (as Karin van Haaren).

== Charts ==
Weekly chart performance for "I Wanna Hear Your Heartbeat (Sunday Girl)"
Chart (1986–1987)	Peak position
Finland (Suomen virallinen lista)	17
Switzerland (Schweizer Hitparade)	21
West Germany (GfK)	14
