= Pretty Young Girl =

Single by Bad Boys Blue

from the album Hot Girls, Bad Boys
- B-side: "Hot Girls – Bad Boys"
- Released: September 10, 1985
- Genre: Eurodisco
- Label: Coconut; Emergency (US)
- Songwriters: Tony Hendrik; Karin van Haaren
- Producers: Tony Hendrik; Karin Hartmann

Bad Boys Blue singles chronology
"You're a Woman" (1985)	"Pretty Young Girl" (1985)	"Kisses and Tears (My One and Only)" (1986)

Music video
- "Pretty Young Girl" on YouTube

"Pretty Young Girl" is a song by Bad Boys Blue from their debut album Hot Girls, Bad Boys. Released as a single in late 1985 and in the United States on December 30, 1986, it reached number 29 in West Germany, number 14 in Austria, and number 30 in Switzerland.

== Composition ==
The song was written and produced by Tony Hendrik and Karin Hartmann (as Karin van Haaren).

== Charts ==
=== Weekly charts ===
1985 weekly chart performance for "Pretty Young Girl"
Chart (1985)	Peak position
Austria (Ö3 Austria Top 40)	14
Belgium (Ultratop 50 Flanders)	24
Switzerland (Schweizer Hitparade)	30
West Germany (GfK)	29

2025 weekly chart performance for "Pretty Young Girl"
Chart (2025)	Peak position
Lithuania Airplay (TopHit)	6

=== Monthly charts ===
2025 monthly chart performance for "Pretty Young Girl"
Chart (2025)	Peak position
Lithuania Airplay (TopHit)	45
