= Bad Boys Blue =

German pop group

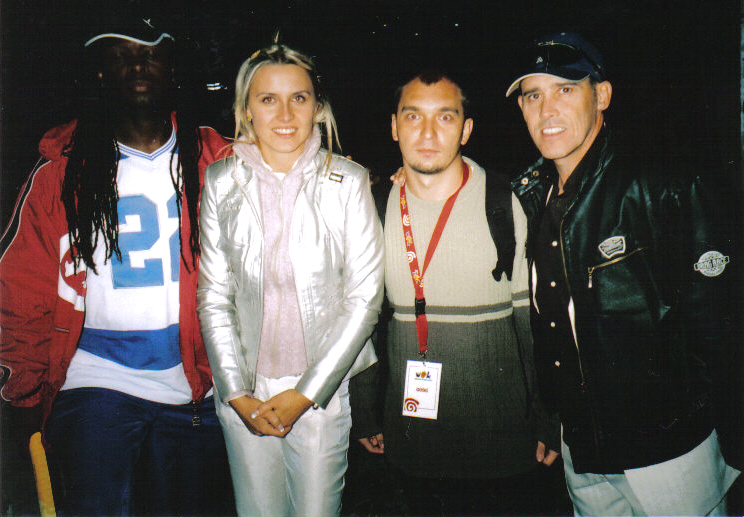

Background information
- Origin: Cologne, West Germany
- Genres: Eurodisco; dance-pop
- Years active: 1984–present
- Labels: Coconut; Bros
- Members: John McInerney
- Past members: Trevor Taylor; Andrew Thomas; Trevor Bannister; Mo Russel; Kevin McCoy; Rui Carlos Ferreira; Kenny "Krayzee" Lewis
- Website: badboysblue.eu

Bad Boys Blue are a pop group formed in Cologne in 1984. The group performed many international hits including "You're a Woman", "Pretty Young Girl", "I Wanna Hear Your Heartbeat", and "Come Back and Stay".

== History ==
=== 1980s ===
Bad Boys Blue was formed in the summer of 1984 by German producer Tony Hendrik and his lyricist wife Karin van Haaren. The original trio consisted of singers Trevor "Supa T" Taylor from Jamaica (the original lead vocalist), John McInerney from the UK, and Andrew Thomas from the US. Their debut single "L.O.V.E. in My Car" failed to make an impression in the pop charts but the follow-up "You're a Woman" was a success, reaching the top 10 in many European countries.

=== 1990s ===
The group has experienced numerous line-up changes. In 1988, Taylor left the group a year after being gradually demoted from his role of the lead singer. He was asked to rejoin the group the following year just for recording sessions for the "Hungry for Love" single that was to be featured on the group's first compilation album Bad Boys Best. Taylor's departure permanently secured McInerney's position as the band's new lead vocalist.

Taylor was replaced by Trevor Bannister (born 5 August 1965 in Grimsby, England), whose function in the group was mainly to perform Trevor Taylor's hits in live gigs. It is during Bannister's tenure with the band that Bad Boys Blue began touring in Eastern Europe thus gaining much popularity there. In 1993, Bannister left, and the remaining two members performed as a duo.

During their entire South African tour, the duo was briefly joined by Owen Standing, who left the group shortly thereafter, and therefore was not considered to be a permanent band member. Multi-talented Irmo Russel (born 15 March 1956 in Aruba, Caribbean Sea) joined the group in 1995, who in addition to stepping into Bannister's shoes was instrumental in revitalizing the group's creative potential, by becoming a composer, video director, and occasionally assuming the role of lead singer on some of the tracks.

At the end of 1999, Kevin McCoy (stage name JoJo Max) replaced Russel by joining Bad Boys Blue full-time after being the group's rapper since 1998. In early 2003, McCoy left, with Bad Boys Blue becoming a duo again. In 2005, McCoy rejoined Thomas' Bad Boys Blue line-up.

=== 2000s ===
In 2005, McInerney and Thomas split under less than amicable circumstances. Thomas formed an all-American version of Bad Boys Blue with former member McCoy and new lead singer (no relation), and they were said to be working on a new release, with McCoy being the trio's producer. Thomas' formation of the band was named "The Real Bad Boys Blue". Their shows were based on the full playback including original music produced by original producers, lead vocals by McInerney and backing vocals by studio session singers.

McInerney kept performing as Bad Boys Blue; at first he performed solo with a live group and backing singers but in the following year he was joined by Carlos Ferreira (born 11 April 1969 in Mozambique), and this presently UK-based duo set out to work on a new album, with the French producers MS Project.

Trevor Taylor, the original lead singer of Bad Boys Blue, died of a heart attack in his home in Cologne on 19 January 2008 at the age of 50.

Bad Boys Blue, in May 2008, released a brand new album called Heart & Soul with 13 new original songs. The album was supported by the release of two maxi-singles: "Still in Love" and "Queen of My Dreams". In May 2009, this formation resumed cooperation with its original label, Coconut Music, in addition to working with its current production team.

The Real Bad Boys Blue, in June 2008, experienced significant changes in personnel. This formation was essentially split in two when Herb McCoy left the group to continue performing solo, but under his own name, using his own versions of some Bad Boys Blue songs. At the same time, Kevin McCoy became the new lead singer of the remaining duo, and a new member, Jeremy Cummins, was added to this group's line-up. This version of the group completed recording of several brand new tracks, all penned and sung by McCoy.

On 19 June 2009, Coconut Music/Sony Music released a special remix album titled Rarities Remixed. The album contained modern remixes of some hit singles and album tracks.

On 21 July 2009, Andrew Thomas died in Cologne at the age of 63. John McInerney is now the only member alive from the original line-up of Bad Boys Blue.

On 30 October 2009, Coconut Music/Sony BMG released a special compilation titled Unforgettable, which was dedicated to both Taylor and Thomas.

=== 2010s ===
In August 2010, Coconut Music/Modern Romantics Productions/Sony Music released the anniversary single titled "Come Back and Stay Re-Recorded 2010" including remixes produced by MS Project, Alex Twister, Spinnin Elements and Almighty. On 27 August 2010, the anniversary album titled 25 was released, including 25 re-recorded hits, 7 brand new remixes plus a bonus DVD.

In September 2011, McInerney made the decision to finish working with Ferreira.

In October 2011, the group was joined by Kenny "Krayzee" Lewis, known from collaborating with C. C. Catch, Touché, and Mark 'Oh.

In September 2012, Coconut Music released a DVD titled Live on TV.

In December 2013, Bad Boys Blue announced on their Facebook page that they were working on a new album. Some of the songs were already completed and that the remainder would be complete by January/February 2014. Some of the songwriters were Pawel Marciniak, Mattias Canerstam and Johann Perrier.

In June 2015, Bad Boys Blue released a new album titled 30. It contains four new and four unreleased songs, along with some remixes of older songs.

In August 2023, Bad Boys Blue embarked on a US tour along with Samantha Fox and Boney M., which included stops in Boston, Los Angeles, Chicago, New York City and San Jose. The shows were put together by Los Angeles based promoters LA Concert Group.

== Line-ups ==
Bad Boys Blue line-ups by year
| 1984–1987 | Trevor Taylor; Andrew Thomas; John McInerney |
| 1987–1988 | John McInerney; Trevor Taylor; Andrew Thomas |
| 1988–1989 | John McInerney; Andrew Thomas |
| 1989–1993 | John McInerney; Andrew Thomas; Trevor Bannister |
| 1993–1995 | John McInerney; Andrew Thomas |
| 1995–1998 | John McInerney; Andrew Thomas; Mo Russel |
| 1998–1999 | John McInerney; Andrew Thomas; Mo Russel; Kevin McCoy |
| 1999–2003 | John McInerney; Andrew Thomas; Kevin McCoy |
| 2003–2005 | John McInerney; Andrew Thomas |
| 2005–2006 | John McInerney; or: Andrew Thomas; Kevin McCoy; Herb McCoy; as The Real Bad Boys Blue |
| 2006–2008 | John McInerney; Carlos Ferreira; or (unchanged): Andrew Thomas; Kevin McCoy; Herb McCoy; as The Real Bad Boys Blue |
| 2008–2009 | John McInerney; Carlos Ferreira; or: Andrew Thomas; Kevin McCoy; Jeremy Cummins; as The Real Bad Boys Blue |
| 2009–2011 | John McInerney; Carlos Ferreira |
| 2011–2012 | John McInerney; Kenny Lewis |
| 2012–present | John McInerney |

== Discography ==
- Hot Girls, Bad Boys (1985)
- Heartbeat (1986)
- Love Is No Crime (1987)
- My Blue World (1988)
- The Fifth (1989)
- Game of Love (1990)
- House of Silence (1991)
- Totally (1992)
- Kiss (1993)
- To Blue Horizons (1994)
- Bang Bang Bang (1996)
- Back (1998)
- ...Continued (1999)
- Follow the Light (1999)
- Tonite (2000)
- Around the World (2003)
- Heart & Soul (2008)
- 25 (The 25th Anniversary Album) (2010)
- 30 (2015)
- Heart & Soul (Recharged) (2018)
- Tears Turning to Ice (2020)
