= John McInerney =

British-German musician

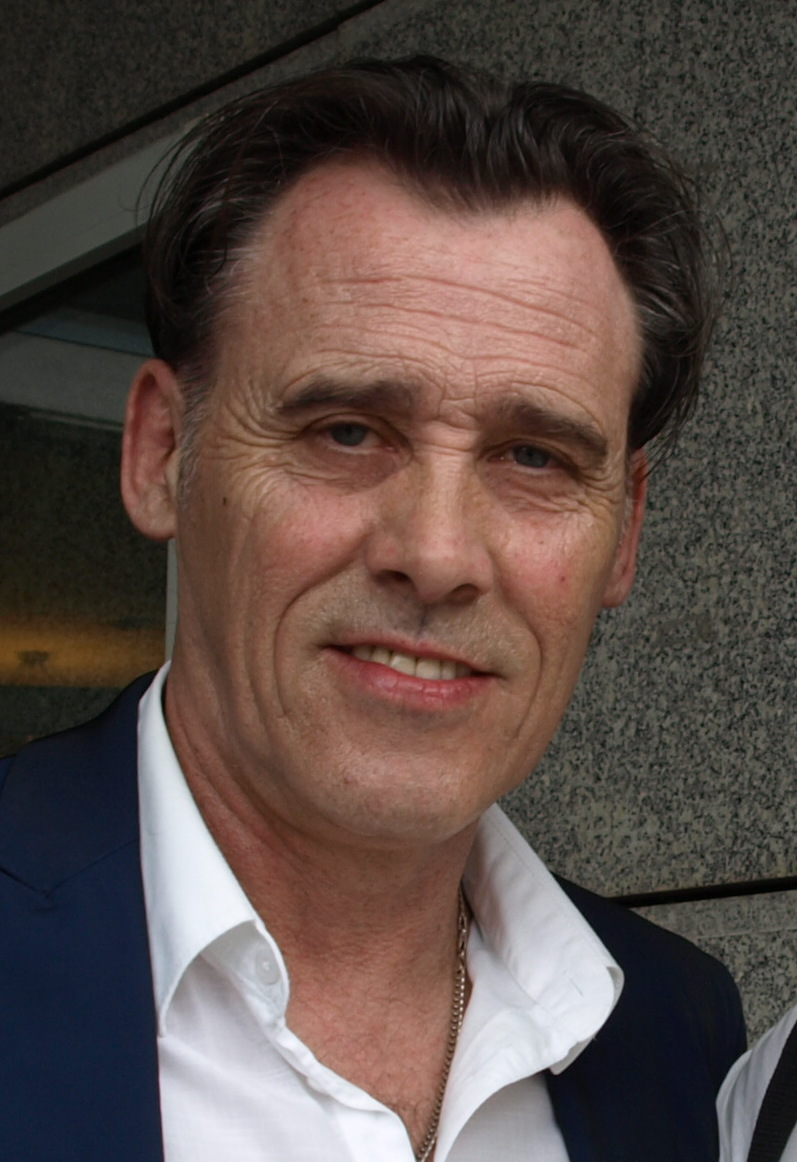
- McInerney in 2013

Background information
- Born: John Edward McInerney; 7 September 1957 (age 69); Liverpool, England
- Occupations: Singer; songwriter; musician
- Years active: 1984–present
- Musical career
- Genres: Eurodisco; hi-NRG; dance-pop; Eurodance; discofox; synth-pop
- Instrument: Vocals
- Labels: Coconut; Bros; Universal

John Edward McInerney (born 7 September 1957) is a British-German singer, songwriter, and the frontman of German band Bad Boys Blue. He is the only band member from the original line-up of the group still performing.

== Early years ==
John McInerney was born in Liverpool, England in 1957. He was interested in music since his childhood and once even appeared on British television performing "She Loves You" by the Beatles. McInerney's mother Agnes died when he was four and a half years old, leaving him and his younger brother to be brought up by their grandmother. When he was 15 years old, he played in the junior team of a local football club. Having graduated from school, McInerney worked as a stockbroker, and in 1979 he decided to move to Germany.

He married in 1985 and has two sons, Ryan Nathan (born in 1989) and Wayne (born in 1992), and one daughter. He owns several pubs in Cologne.

== Bad Boys Blue ==
Bad Boys Blue was formed in the summer of 1984 by German producer Tony Hendrik and his lyricist wife Karin van Haaren. The original trio was composed of John McInerney, Jamaican Trevor "Supa T" Taylor (the original lead vocalist), and American Andrew Thomas.

The producers looked for band members in London, but they were eventually referred to Thomas who lived in Cologne. Thomas referred Taylor, and Taylor in turn invited McInerney.

After joining the group, McInerney initially sang mostly in the chorus—being in the shadow of the first lead singer at that time. Taylor then switched when McInerney sang "Come Back and Stay", which became a big hit. From that moment, McInerney gradually began singing more lead parts, and Taylor's voice became less present. After the departure of Taylor in 1989, McInerney had sung almost all the songs of the band. In January 2005, he ended his long-time collaboration with Thomas. Over the last few years, he has lived in Poland.
