= Tony Hendrik =

German music producer and composer

- Also known as: Dee Dee Halligan; Jimmy Tarsus
- Born: Dieter Lünstedt; 4 March 1945 (age 81); Bad Bederkesa, Germany
- Genres: Euro disco, dance-pop, eurodance, house
- Occupations: Musician, songwriter, composer
- Years active: 1960s—present
- Labels: Coconut Records, Vogue, Hansa International
- Website: www.tony-hendrik.com

Tony Hendrik (born Dieter Lünstedt, 4 March 1945 in Bad Bederkesa, a.k.a. Dee Dee Halligan, Jimmy Tarsus) is a German music producer, composer, and owner of a record label. The most known artists and bands he has produced and composed for are Bad Boys Blue, Londonbeat, and Haddaway. Hendrik co-wrote the Haddaway song "What Is Love."

== Biography ==
Tony Hendrik was born in Bad Bederkesa in 1945. He graduated from a high school in Rendsburg and initially founded a beat band named "Hendrik & The Luniks" that performed at Hamburg's Star-Club. In 1966, he left his hometown to study in Cologne. There he started a new band "The Tony Hendrik Five". By 1970, Tony won his first success with the group—single "The Grooviest Girl in the World" became his first bestseller.

He subsequently worked for the German branch of the record label Vogue where he began producing.

In 1984, Tony Hendrik and his wife Karin Hartmann were looking for "new sound in music," and put together the band Bad Boys Blue, selecting the band members. The band was a huge success in Europe, with Hendrik producing their charting hit singles "You are a Woman", "Pretty Young Girl", "Lady in Black" and "Come Back and Stay".

Hendrik (under then name Dee Dee Halligan), along with his wife Karin Hartmann (under then name Junior Torello) wrote and produced "What Is Love" for Haddaway, which was released in 1993. It became one of their biggest hits, charting at #11 in USA Billboard 100 and #1 in multiple countries such as France, Austria, Nederlands, Denmark, Spain and Italy.

== Coconut Records ==
Coconut Records is a German record label formed in 1981 by Tony Hendrik and Karin Hartmann. The label has released multiple genres of music, including dance, schlager, eurodance, electronica, Hi-NRG, Dance-pop and R&B. Artists currently signed to Coconut Records include Londonbeat, Andreas Martin, Wolfgang Petry, Haddaway, Bad Boys Blue, Soultans, Chyp-Notic and A La Carte.

== Discography ==
Artist	Title	Year	Credit
A la carte	ABC Of Holidays	1989	Music/lyrics
A la carte	Ahé Tamouré	1982	Music/lyrics producer
A la carte	Cotton Fields	1983	producer
A la carte	Cubatao	1981	Music/lyrics producer
A la carte	Do wah diddy diddy	1979	producer
A la carte	Doctor, Doctor (Help Me Please)	1979	Music/lyrics producer
A la carte	Dong dong diki diki dong	1981	producer
A la carte	Farewell, farewell to Carlingford	1980	Music/lyrics producer
A la carte	Have I The Right	1983	producer
A la carte	Have You Forgotten (Volga Song)	1981	producer
A la carte	Heart Full of Soul	1983	producer
A la carte	Hey John, Hey Tom	1983	producer
A la carte	I Don't Want No Plastic Lover	1980	producer
A la carte	I'm A Believer	1983	producer
A la carte	In The Summer Sun Of Greece	1981	producer
A la carte	It Was a Night of Wonder	1979	Music/lyrics producer
A la carte	Jimmy Gimme Reggae	1980	Music/lyrics producer
A la carte	Jimmy Gimme Reggae (New Version)	1984	Music/lyrics producer
A la carte	Lightyear's Away From Home	1984	producer
A la carte	Morning Songbird	1981	Music/lyrics producer
A la carte	Morning Sunbird	1981	Music/lyrics producer
A la carte	On Top of Old Smokie	1983	producer
A la carte	Price of Love	1979	Music/lyrics producer
A la carte	radio	1983	producer
A la carte	Red Indian Drums	1980	Music/lyrics producer
A la carte	Ring me, honey	1980	Music/lyrics producer
A la carte	River Blue	1981	Music/lyrics producer
A la carte	Stupid Cupid	1983	producer
A la carte	Tell Him	1983	producer
A la carte	Tennessee Waltz	1983	producer
A la carte	The Hit Mix 1998	1998	Music/lyrics producer
A la carte	Try a Little Tenderness	1981	Music/lyrics producer
A la carte	Viva Torero	1981	Music/lyrics producer
A la carte	Wanted (Jean le voleur)	1981	producer
A la carte	When the Boys Come Home	1979	Music/lyrics producer
A la carte	You Get Me on the Run	1981	Music/lyrics producer
A la carte	You're Still My Fantasy	1983	Music/lyrics producer
A La Carte feat. Jojo Max	Do Wah Diddy Diddy '99	1999	producer
Airplay [DE]	For Your Love	1985	Music/lyrics producer
Andrew Martin	Farewell to the stars	1983	Music/lyrics producer
Andrew Martin	Amore mio	1982	Music/lyrics producer
Andrew Martin	Bittersweet	1982	producer
Andrew Martin	Stay Tonight	1982	producer
Andrew Martin	Cathy's Clown	1982	producer
Andrew Martin	The First Time in Life	1984	producer
Andrew Martin	Heaven Can Wait	1984	Music/lyrics producer
Andrew Martin	You're Coming Home	1982	producer
Andrew Martin	I'm Alone	1982	producer
Andrew Martin	I Live, I Die	1983	Music/lyrics producer
Andrew Martin	My Long Journey to You	1984	producer
Andrew Martin	Saturday Night in the City	1985	Music/lyrics
Andrew Martin	Solo do	1982	Music/lyrics producer
Andrew Martin	Traces that the wind blows away	1983	Music/lyrics producer
Andrew Martin	Hello, Uncle Krämer	1980	producer
Andrew Martin	World	1982	producer
Andrew Martin	When you cry	1980	Music/lyrics producer
Andrew Martin	Where is the destination of your trip?	1982	producer
Andy & Co	I was born laughing	1974	producer
Andy & Co	If	1973	producer
Andy & Co	Show me the way	1973	Music/lyrics producer
Andy & Co	Two guitars, vocals and red wine	1974	Music/lyrics producer
Andy Andrews	a² * b * ?beep	1978	producer
Andy Andrews	Do you remember?	1979	Music/lyrics producer
Andy Andrews	Hello, this is Moni (The answering machine song)	1979	producer
Andy Andrews	What's wrong with Charlie Berger?	1979	Music/lyrics producer
Andy Andrews	When a Vega boy is lovesick	1978	Music/lyrics producer
Andy Andrews	Yellow Bird	1979	producer
Andy Martin [DE]	One Way Love	1978	producer
Andy Martin [DE]	South Of The Border	1978	producer
Atencion! Aura [EN]	Esperanza Gotta Find You	2004 2001	Music/lyrics producer (Rico Montanes) Music/lyrics producer
Aura [EN]	You Came	2001	producer
Bad Boys Blue	A Love Like This	1993	Music/lyrics
Bad Boys Blue	A Train To Nowhere	1989	Music/lyrics producer
Bad Boys Blue	A World Without You (Michelle)	1988	Music/lyrics producer
Bad Boys Blue	Aguarda tu amor	1993	Music/lyrics producer
Bad Boys Blue	B By Your Side	1998	Music/lyrics producer
Bad Boys Blue	Baby Blue	1991	Music/lyrics producer
Bad Boys Blue	Back To The Future	1999	producer
Bad Boys Blue	Can't Live Without You	1999	Music/lyrics producer
Bad Boys Blue	Chains Of Love	1990	Music/lyrics producer
Bad Boys Blue	Come back and stay	1987	Music/lyrics producer
Bad Boys Blue	Dance The Night Away	1986	Music/lyrics
Bad Boys Blue	Dancing With The Bad Boys	1991	Music/lyrics producer
Bad Boys Blue	Deep Into My Emotions	1991	Music/lyrics producer
Bad Boys Blue	Do What You Do	2000	Music/lyrics producer
Bad Boys Blue	Don't Break The Heart	1998	Music/lyrics producer
Bad Boys Blue	Don't Leave Me Now	1988	producer
Bad Boys Blue	Don't walk away, Suzanne	1988	Music/lyrics producer
Bad Boys Blue	Don't Want Your Love	2001	Music/lyrics
Bad Boys Blue	Fly Away	1989	Music/lyrics
Bad Boys Blue	Follow The Light	1999	Music/lyrics
Bad Boys Blue	From Heaven To Heartache	1998	Music/lyrics
Bad Boys Blue	Gimme Back My Love	1991	Music/lyrics producer
Bad Boys Blue	Gimme Gimme Your Lovin' (Little Lady)	1987	Music/lyrics producer
Bad Boys Blue	Have You Ever Had A Love Like This	1992	Music/lyrics producer
Bad Boys Blue	Heart Of Midnight	1993	Music/lyrics producer
Bad Boys Blue	Hot Girls - Bad Boys	1985	Music/lyrics producer
Bad Boys Blue	House Of Silence	1991	Music/lyrics producer
Bad Boys Blue	How I Need You	1990	Music/lyrics producer
Bad Boys Blue	Hungry For Love	1988	Music/lyrics producer
Bad Boys Blue	I Am Your Believer	1990	Music/lyrics producer
Bad Boys Blue	I believe	1998	Music/lyrics producer
Bad Boys Blue	I do it all for you, baby	1993	Music/lyrics producer
Bad Boys Blue	I Don't Know Her Name	1990	Music/lyrics producer
Bad Boys Blue	I Don't Wanna Love You	1990	Music/lyrics producer
Bad Boys Blue	I Live	1985	Music/lyrics producer
Bad Boys Blue	I Need A Woman	1990	Music/lyrics producer
Bad Boys Blue	I totally miss you	1992	Music/lyrics producer
Bad Boys Blue	I Wanna Hear Your Heartbeat (Sunday Girl)	1986	Music/lyrics producer
Bad Boys Blue	I'll Be Good	2000	Music/lyrics producer
Bad Boys Blue	I'm Never Gonna Fall In Love Again	1992	producer
Bad Boys Blue	I'm Still In Love	1993	Music/lyrics producer
Bad Boys Blue	Jenny, come home	1990	Music/lyrics producer
Bad Boys Blue	Johnny	1992	Music/lyrics producer
Bad Boys Blue	Jungle In My Heart	1990	Music/lyrics producer
Bad Boys Blue	Kiss you all over, baby	1985	Music/lyrics producer
Bad Boys Blue	Kisses And Tears (My One And Only)	1986	Music/lyrics producer
Bad Boys Blue	LOVE In My Car	1984	Music/lyrics producer
Bad Boys Blue	Lady Blue	1986	Music/lyrics producer
Bad Boys Blue	Lady In Black	1989	Music/lyrics producer
Bad Boys Blue	Love Really Hurts Without You	1986	producer
Bad Boys Blue	Lovers In The Sand	1988	Music/lyrics producer
Bad Boys Blue	Megamix Vol. 1	1998	Music/lyrics producer
Bad Boys Blue	Never Never	1999	Music/lyrics producer
Bad Boys Blue	Pretty Young Girl	1985	Music/lyrics producer
Bad Boys Blue	Queen Of Hearts	1990	Music/lyrics producer
Bad Boys Blue	Rain In My Heart	1988	Music/lyrics
Bad Boys Blue	Rhythm Of The Night	1992	Music/lyrics producer
Bad Boys Blue	Save Your Love	1992	Music/lyrics producer
Bad Boys Blue	Sooner Or Later	1993	Music/lyrics producer
Bad Boys Blue	Stay With Me	1999	Music/lyrics producer
Bad Boys Blue	Sweet Little Things	2001	Music/lyrics
Bad Boys Blue	Tell It Everybody	1991	Music/lyrics producer
Bad Boys Blue	The Power Of The Night	1999	Music/lyrics
Bad Boys Blue	The Turbo Megamix	1998	Music/lyrics
Bad Boys Blue	The Woman I Love	1993	Music/lyrics producer
Bad Boys Blue	There Is Nothing That Compares	1999	Music/lyrics producer
Bad Boys Blue	Train At Midnight	1991	Music/lyrics producer
Bad Boys Blue	Under The Boardwalk	1991	producer
Bad Boys Blue	Warm And Tender Love	1992	producer
Bad Boys Blue	What A Feeling	1992	Music/lyrics producer
Bad Boys Blue	When Our Love Was Young	1991	Music/lyrics producer
Bad Boys Blue	Where Have You Gone?	1993	Music/lyrics producer
Bad Boys Blue	Who's That Man?	1992	Music/lyrics producer
Bad Boys Blue	Wouldn't It Be Good	1999	Music/lyrics producer
Bad Boys Blue	You're A Woman	1985	Music/lyrics producer
Bad Boys Blue	You're A Woman (Remix '92)	1992	Music/lyrics producer
Bad Boys Blue	You're A Woman '98	1998	Music/lyrics producer
Banaroo	Don't Leave	2007	Music/Lyrics (Mike Linceton) Producer (Mike Linceton)
Banaroo	Hey Comanchero	2006	Music/Lyrics (Mike Linceton) Producer (Mike Linceton)
Banaroo	Mamacita	2006	Music/Lyrics (Mike Linceton) Producer (Mike Linceton)
Banaroo	Sailor dance	2006	Music/Lyrics (Mike Linceton) Producer (Mike Linceton)
BZN	Waanzin		Music/lyrics
Charlie Brunner	Whatever you do	2011	Music/lyrics
Chyp Notic Chyp Notic	I can't get enough 1-4U	1991 1990	Music/Lyrics Producer (Don Chereyne) Music/Lyrics Producer
Chyp Notic	Nothing Compares 2 U	1990	producer
Cymurai feat. Thea Austin	Vibe (Sending Messages)	1996	Music/Lyrics (Dee Dee Halligan) Producer (Dee Dee Halligan)
Daffi von Cramer	Locomotion	1972	producer
Daffi von Cramer	Party boy	1972	Music/lyrics producer
David Brandes	Craziness	1990	Music/lyrics producer
David Rope	Stay	2011	Music/lyrics producer
David Rope	The last prayer	2010	Music/lyrics producer
David Rope	The madness remains	2011	producer
David Rope	You, I love you	2010	Music/lyrics producer
David Rope	Win – lose	2011	Music/lyrics producer
David Rope	Heartless – painless	2011	Music/lyrics producer
David Rope	I want more	2011	Music/lyrics producer
David Rope	Sometime and somewhere	2011	Music/lyrics producer
David Rope	Pure love	2011	Music/lyrics producer
David Rope	It's not worth it	2011	producer
David Rope	Lose yourself	2011	Music/lyrics producer
Davy James	Dream baby	1988	producer
Denny Christian	Baby, I love you	1973	Music/lyrics producer
Denny Christian	Bella Donna	1978	Music/lyrics producer
Denny Christian	German Master March (The Cards…)	1976	producer
Denny Christian	Did I lose you tonight?	1977	Music/lyrics producer
Denny Christian	Today my heart was lost	1975	Music/lyrics producer
Denny Christian	Every great love has a happy ending	1973	Music/lyrics
Denny Christian	Mango mango	1973	Music/lyrics producer
Denny Christian	Marie Louise	1975	Music/lyrics producer
Denny Christian	Mustafa	1977	Music/lyrics producer
Denny Christian	My Spanish Lady	1976	Music/lyrics producer
Denny Christian	Oh Mary Ann	1976	Music/lyrics producer
Denny Christian	Rainy Rainy Day	1974	Music/lyrics producer
Denny Christian	Rosamunde	1974	producer
Detlev	Where does the guy have his eyes?	1978	Music/lyrics
The flippers	Julia	1970	Music/lyrics
The Funkids	Free	1994	Music/Lyrics (Dee Dee Halligan)
The party vultures	Madness (hell, hell, hell)	2011	Music/lyrics
The Puchers	Madness (Hell Hell Hell)	2012	Music/lyrics
DJ North Curve	Craziness!	2002	Music/lyrics
Emily & Tom	Oh, Heinrich (Tonight we're going to Kaminski's ball)	1975	Music/lyrics producer
Emily & Tom	Stay with me until the day awakens	1977	Music/lyrics producer
Emily & Tom	The beautiful Karl is king	1975	Music/lyrics producer
Emily & Tom	A ducat donkey (Old Comrades)	1975	producer
Emily & Tom	There is brass music in the village	1975	Music/lyrics producer
Emily & Tom	Louie Louie	1976	Music/lyrics producer
Emily & Tom	Dear Mister	1976	Music/lyrics producer
Emily & Tom	Two guitars, vocals and red wine	1977	Music/lyrics producer
Eminem feat. Lil Wayne	No Love	2010	Music/Lyrics (Dee Dee Halligan)
Fingers & Kadel	Craziness	2011	Music/lyrics
Fruit	Bananas	1979	Music/lyrics producer
Fruit	Heart Full Of Soul	1980	producer
Fruit	Hey John	1980	Music/lyrics producer
Fruit	I Don't Want No Plastic Lover	1979	Music/lyrics producer
G Squad	A cune fille au monde	1996	Music/Lyrics (Dee Dee Halligan)
Haddaway	Another Day Without You	1995	Music/Lyrics (Dee Dee Halligan) Producer (Dee Dee Halligan)
Haddaway	Baby Don't Go	1995	Music/Lyrics (Dee Dee Halligan) Producer (Dee Dee Halligan)
Haddaway	Catch a Fire	1995	Music/Lyrics (Dee Dee Halligan) Producer (Dee Dee Halligan)
Haddaway	Come Back (Love Has Got A Hold On Me)	1993	Music/Lyrics (Dee Dee Halligan) Producer (Dee Dee Halligan)
Haddaway	Fly Away	1995	Music/Lyrics (Dee Dee Halligan) Producer (Dee Dee Halligan)
Haddaway	I know	1995	Music/Lyrics (Dee Dee Halligan) Producer (Dee Dee Halligan)
Haddaway	I miss you	1993	Music/Lyrics (Dee Dee Halligan) Producer (Dee Dee Halligan)
Haddaway	In The Mix	1999	Music/Lyrics (Dee Dee Halligan)
Haddaway	Life	1993	Music/Lyrics (Dee Dee Halligan) Producer (Dee Dee Halligan)
Haddaway	Live/Remix	1993	Music/Lyrics (Dee Dee Halligan) Producer (Dee Dee Halligan)
Haddaway	Make Me Believe	1998	Music/lyrics (Jimmy Tarsus)
Haddaway	Mom's House	1993	Producer (Dee Dee Halligan)
Haddaway	Rock My Heart	1993	Music/Lyrics (Dee Dee Halligan) Producer (Dee Dee Halligan)
Haddaway	Shout	1993	Music/Lyrics (Dee Dee Halligan) Producer (Dee Dee Halligan)
Haddaway	Stir It Up	1993	Producer (Dee Dee Halligan)
Haddaway	Tell Me Where It Hurts	1993	Producer (Dee Dee Halligan)
Haddaway	The First Cut Is The Deepest	1995	Producer (Dee Dee Halligan)
Haddaway	Waiting For A Better World	1995	Music/Lyrics (Dee Dee Halligan) Producer (Dee Dee Halligan)
Haddaway	What About Me	1997	Music/Lyrics (Dee Dee Halligan)
Haddaway	What Is Love	1992	Music/Lyrics (Dee Dee Halligan) Producer (Dee Dee Halligan)
Haddaway	What Is Love – Reloaded	2003	Music/Lyrics (Dee Dee Halligan) Producer (Dee Dee Halligan)
Haddaway	What Is Love – Remix	1993	Music/Lyrics (Dee Dee Halligan) Producer (Dee Dee Halligan)
Haddaway	When The Feeling's Gone	1993	Music/Lyrics (Dee Dee Halligan) Producer (Dee Dee Halligan)
Haddaway	Who Do You Love?	1998	Music/Lyrics (Dee Dee Halligan) Producer (Dee Dee Halligan)
Haddaway	Yeah	1993	Producer (Dee Dee Halligan)
Haddaway	You gave me love	2010	Music/lyrics producer
Hermes House Band	What Is Love	2009	Music/Lyrics (Dee Dee Halligan)
Joyce [1970s]	sweet Dreams	1977	producer
Joyce [1970s]	Try Me (Magic Fly)	1977	producer
Julian [1980s]	Oh my love	1988	Music/lyrics producer
Julian [1980s]	Straight To My Heart	1986	Music/lyrics producer
Julian [1980s]	The Rain Dance	1986	Music/lyrics producer
Julian [1980s]	What if	1988	Music/lyrics producer
Juliane Werding	You're right with me	1977	Music/lyrics producer
Juliane Werding	You belong on a leash, Paul	1977	producer
Juliane Werding	A size too big	1977	producer
Juliane Werding	Friedhelm the Killer	1977	producer
Juliane Werding	Mr. Host, I want to pay	1977	producer
Juliane Werding	Hey Jew	1977	producer
Juliane Werding	Hotel Royal	1978	Music/lyrics
Juliane Werding	I heard something ringing	1977	producer
Juliane Werding	Obituary for Luigi Thomasetti	1977	producer
Juliane Werding	Oh man, oh man, where does the man have his eyes	1977	Music/lyrics producer
Juliane Werding	Sunburn in Westerland	1977	producer
Juliane Werding	Saying sorry is so hard	1977	producer
Kim Merz	The guy next to her	1983	producer
Kim Merz	I do	1983	producer
Kim Merz	Click	1984	producer
Kim Merz	Murder in the 1st program	1983	producer
Kim Merz	Really strong	1983	Music/lyrics producer
Klaas meets Haddaway	What Is Love 2K9	2009	Music/Lyrics (Dee Dee Halligan)
Linda Kendrik Four Linda Kendrik Four Lollies	Stupid Cupid Hideaway Madness (…hell, hell, hell)	1981 1981 1997	Producer music/lyrics Producer music/lyrics
Londonbeat Londonbeat	Where Are You A World Without You (Brothers And Sisters)	2003 2004	Music/lyrics producer producer
Londonbeat	About You	2004	producer
Londonbeat	Back In The Hi-Life	2004	Producer (Dieter Lynstedt)
Londonbeat	Black	2004	producer
Londonbeat	Busker McGee	2004	producer
Londonbeat	Bustin' Free	2004	producer
Londonbeat	Fame	2004	producer
Londonbeat	Heaven	2004	producer
Londonbeat	I believe	2004	producer
Londonbeat	Jump In My Ride	2004	producer
Londonbeat	Kiss Of Life	2004	producer
Londonbeat	The Air	2004	Music/lyrics (Dieter Lynstedt) Producer (Dieter Lynstedt)
Londonbeat	Walls Of Love	2004	producer
Los Angeles The Voices	Onoverwinbaar	2011	Music/lyrics
Marcell Dominik & Eichblatt.	The summer was still young	2005	Music/lyrics
Marco Paulo	Deixa viver	1984	Music/lyrics
Marco Ventre & band	Heaven Can Wait	2011	Music/lyrics
Micah Marah	I was there when I woke up	1989	Music/lyrics
Mike Bauhaus	Solo do	2008	Music/lyrics
Monza	Hello taxi number 10	1978	Music/lyrics
Nadine	The Hemel brand	2007	Music/lyrics
Nathalie Makoma	I'm Glad I'm Alive	2005	Music/lyrics
Neil Smith	Help Me Through The Summer	1985	Music/lyrics producer
New Romance	You're My First Love (Head Over Heels)	1987	Music/lyrics producer
OG	Running From You (What Is Love)	2012	Music/Lyrics (Dee Dee Halligan)
Otto	Craziness	2002	Music/lyrics
Phil & John	... because for more than 1000 years	1974	producer
Phil & John	Blue sea, hot sun and wine	1975	Music/lyrics producer
Phil & John	Buona sera	1975	producer
Phil & John	Canta Canta Libre	1973	Music/lyrics producer
Phil & John	The carousel of love	1973	Music/lyrics producer
Phil & John	The party is over	1973	Music/lyrics producer
Phil & John	You or none	1972	Music/lyrics producer
Phil & John	One + one is one	1973	Music/lyrics producer
Phil & John	Give love a chance	1976	Music/lyrics producer
Phil & John	Harley Davidson	1973	Music/lyrics producer
Phil & John	Have you ever kissed under an umbrella?	1975	Music/lyrics producer
Phil & John	Hello buddy	1971	producer
Phil & John	Hello Martina	1974	Music/lyrics producer
Phil & John	Hello, Mary Lou	1972	producer
Phil & John	I support my husband every day	1976	Music/lyrics producer
Phil & John	Keep searching	1973	producer
Phil & John	Come with me for the weekend	1979	Music/lyrics producer
Phil & John	Marina	1973	producer
Phil & John	Mary Brown	1976	Music/lyrics producer
Phil & John	Tomorrow the sun will shine for you again	1973	Music/lyrics producer
Phil & John	Oh Sunny Sunny	1973	Music/lyrics producer
Phil & John	Ramona	1978	producer
Phil & John	Rain and sunshine	1973	Music/lyrics producer
Phil & John	Rolly Mony	1971	Music/lyrics producer
Phil & John	'It's sad but true	1975	Music/lyrics producer
Phil & John	Sailor Bill	1976	Music/lyrics producer
Phil & John	Shadow of the night	1973	Music/lyrics producer
Phil & John	Don't trust a woman over 16 (...and the moral of the story)	1975	Music/lyrics producer
Phil & John	Where were you last night, my beautiful child?	1974	Music/lyrics producer
Roxanne	Boys In Black Cars	1986	Music/lyrics producer
Roxanne	Charlene	1985	Music/lyrics producer
Roxanne	Give A Little Love	1986	Music/lyrics
Sign O'Soul	Don't Play My Song	1990	Music/Lyrics (Dee Dee Halligan) Producer (Dee Dee Halligan)
Silent Circle	I Am Your Believer	1989	Music/lyrics producer
Sylvia	The summer was still young	1985	Music/lyrics
Sylvia	I live my life	1984	Music/lyrics producer
Sylvia	King & Queen	1985	Music/lyrics producer
Sylvia	Tears why?	1984	Music/lyrics producer
Soultans	Can't Take My Hands Off You	1996	Music/Lyrics (Dee Dee Halligan) Producer (Dee Dee Halligan)
Soultans	Gimme More Of Your Love	1997	Music/Lyrics (Dee Dee Halligan) Producer (Dee Dee Halligan)
Soultans	I Can't Stay Away From You	1997	Music/Lyrics (Dee Dee Halligan) Producer (Dee Dee Halligan)
Soultans	I Heard It Through The Grapevine	1996	Producer (Dee Dee Halligan)
Soultans	I know	1996	Music/Lyrics (Dee Dee Halligan) Producer (Dee Dee Halligan)
Soultans	LOVE	1997	Music/lyrics
Soultans	Rhythm Of Love	1998	Music/Lyrics (Dee Dee Halligan) Producer (Dee Dee Halligan)
Soultans	Set Me Free	2001	Music/lyrics producer
SST	Universe	1987	producer
SST	Why Do I Fall In Love...	1987	Music/lyrics producer
TBCV	Oh man, oh man, where does the man have his eyes	1978	Music/lyrics
TBCV	When The Boys Come Home	1979	Music/lyrics
Tatyana	Never Never	1993	Music/lyrics producer
Tony Hendrik Five Tony Hendrik Five Tony Hendrik Five Tony Hendrik Five Tony Hendrik Five Tony Hendrik Five Tony Hendrik Five Tony Hendrik Five Tony Hendrik Five Tony Hendrik Five Tony Hendrik Five Tony Hendrik Five Tony Hendrik Five Tony Hendrik Five Tony Hendrik Five The Hollies	Night Flight Roland Gonna See Rocksville Criss Cross Merry-Go-Round I've Said My Say There Is A Tavern In The Town Los Angeles The Grooviest Girl In The World Renee Mr. G Down On The Corner So Long, Bunny! Baby, How Are You Some Kinda Fun Shine Silently	1967 1967 1967 1967 1967 1968 1968 1969 1970 1970 1970 1971 1971 1972 1972 1988	Music/lyrics Music/lyrics Music /lyrics Music/lyrics Music/lyrics Producer Music/lyrics Producer Producer Music/lyrics Producer Producer Producer Music /lyrics Producer Producer Music /lyrics Producer Music/lyrics Producer Producer Producer
The Hollies	Stand By Me	1988	Music/lyrics
The Hollies	Your Eyes	1988	Music/lyrics producer
The Searchers	No Other Love	1988	Music/lyrics producer
Trouble [DE]	Cosmetics	1982	Music/lyrics producer
Trouble [DE]	No time to lose	1981	Music/lyrics producer
Trouble [DE]	Oh Johnny	1981	producer
Trouble [DE]	Trouble	1982	producer
Twenty one	The Eyes Of Don Johnson	1987	Music/lyrics producer
Valverde Brothers	After Midnight	1978	producer
Valverde Brothers	Layla	1977	producer
Valverde Brothers	Living A Lie	1978	Music/lyrics producer
Valverde Brothers	Mexican Taxi Man	1977	Music/lyrics producer
Valverde Brothers	Moonlight	1979	producer
Valverde Brothers	Standing In The Shadow Of Love	1978	producer
Valverde Brothers	UK	1979	Music/lyrics producer
Venus	Disco Spanish	1986	producer
Venus	Hot Sun On Video	1985	Music/lyrics producer
Vladimir Boldt	All the stars are watching you	2009	Music/lyrics (Mike Linceton) Music/lyrics
Vladimir Boldt	All the stars are watching you	2009	Producer (Mike Linceton)
Vladimir Boldt	You are never alone	2009	Music/Lyrics (Mike Linceton) Producer (Mike Linceton)
Vladimir Boldt	You will always be you	2009	Music/Lyrics (Mike Linceton) Producer (Mike Linceton)
Vladimir Boldt	It's about more	2009	Producer (Mike Linceton)
Vladimir Boldt	I believe in you	2009	Music/Lyrics (Mike Linceton) Producer (Mike Linceton)
Vladimir Boldt	I want to share everything with you	2009	Music/Lyrics (Mike Linceton) Producer (Mike Linceton)
Vladimir Boldt	In her eyes	2009	Music/Lyrics (Mike Linceton) Producer (Mike Linceton)
Vladimir Boldt	At some point the day will come for you	2009	Music/Lyrics (Mike Linceton) Producer (Mike Linceton)
Vladimir Boldt	My light in the darkness	2009	Music/Lyrics (Mike Linceton) Producer (Mike Linceton)
Vladimir Boldt	Senza te – without you	2009	Music/Lyrics (Mike Linceton) Producer (Mike Linceton)
Vladimir Boldt	Trust in love	2009	Music/Lyrics (Mike Linceton) Producer (Mike Linceton)
Vladimir Boldt	When our path divides	2009	Producer (Mike Linceton)
Wolfgang Petry	Baby, I Love You	1976	producer
Wolfgang Petry	The Kähl doesn't cry	1979	Music/lyrics
Wolfgang Petry	Because once you've run out of steam (it's all too late)	1979	Music/lyrics producer
Wolfgang Petry	The sky burns	1982	Music/lyrics producer
Wolfgang Petry	The longest single in the world	1996	Music/lyrics
Wolfgang Petry	The fourth dimension	1983	Music/lyrics producer
Wolfgang Petry	Dora 3	1979	producer
Wolfgang Petry	Topsy-turvy	1981	Music/lyrics producer
Wolfgang Petry	You're coming home	1981	producer
Wolfgang Petry	A completely normal day	1977	Music/lyrics producer
Wolfgang Petry	A few hours of tenderness	1977	Music/lyrics
Wolfgang Petry	One is missing	1979	Music/lyrics producer
Wolfgang Petry	Once in a lifetime	1983	Music/lyrics
Wolfgang Petry	Stranger	1976	producer
Wolfgang Petry	Spring	1976	producer
Wolfgang Petry	All or nothing	1980	producer
Wolfgang Petry	Gianna (Love in the Car)	1978	producer
Wolfgang Petry	Merciless	1984	Music/lyrics
Wolfgang Petry	Did I lose you tonight?	1979	Music/lyrics producer
Wolfgang Petry	Hey Jew	1976	producer
Wolfgang Petry	I'm going with you	1981	Music/lyrics producer
Wolfgang Petry	I believed you loved me	1976	producer
Wolfgang Petry	I never drink tequila anymore	1978	Music/lyrics producer
Wolfgang Petry	Every friend is also a man	1976	Music/lyrics producer
Wolfgang Petry	Jessica	1981	producer
Wolfgang Petry	Lie	1983	Music/lyrics producer
Wolfgang Petry	My home	1980	producer
Wolfgang Petry	My wild years	1981	Music/lyrics producer
Wolfgang Petry	Now you walk hand in hand	1976	Music/lyrics producer
Wolfgang Petry	Ruby	1977	Music/lyrics producer
Wolfgang Petry	Summer in the city	1976	Music/lyrics producer
Wolfgang Petry	Do it!	1981	Music/lyrics producer
Wolfgang Petry	Survive	1983	Music/lyrics producer
Wolfgang Petry	And Sandra is crying	1980	Music/lyrics producer
Wolfgang Petry	Under One Roof	1976	producer
Wolfgang Petry	On the way	1981	producer
Wolfgang Petry	Vacation under the apple tree	1978	producer
Wolfgang Petry	Craziness	1983	Music/lyrics producer
Wolfgang Petry	What is the devil doing?	1983	Music/lyrics producer
Wolfgang Petry	If you want to go	1980	Music/lyrics producer
Wolfgang Petry	When I go	1979	Music/lyrics producer
Wolfgang Petry	Who knows Julie?	1976	Music/lyrics producer
Wolfgang Petry	You've Lost That Lovin' Feelin'	1976	producer
Xanadu	Farewell to the stars	1991	Music/lyrics producer
Xanadu	All power to dreams	1991	producer
Xanadu	At the end of the night	1991	Music/lyrics producer
Xanadu	Berlin, Berlin	1991	producer
Xanadu	Burning Heart	1991	Music/lyrics producer
Xanadu	Charlene	1990	Music/lyrics
Xanadu	Charline [1992]	1992	Music/lyrics producer
Xanadu	The sky burns	1990	Music/lyrics producer
Xanadu	One day, one night, one hour	1991	Music/lyrics producer
Xanadu	A dream for this world	1989	Music/lyrics producer
Xanadu	Free like you	1991	producer
Xanadu	Have you already forgotten everything?	1990	Music/lyrics
Xanadu	I want you completely or not at all	1990	producer
Xanadu	Island behind the horizon	1990	Music/lyrics producer
Xanadu	I have never regretted an hour	1990	Music/lyrics
Xanadu	King and Queen	1990	Music/lyrics producer
Xanadu	Love is alive	1991	Music/lyrics producer
Xanadu	The sun never shines at night	1991	Music/lyrics producer
Xanadu	Paloma Blue	1990	Music/lyrics producer
Xanadu	Tears, why?	1991	producer
Xanadu	What if	1990	Music/lyrics
Xanadu	If you want …	1989	Music/lyrics producer
Yoomiii	Gimme, gimme, gimme	2006	Music/Lyrics (Mike Linceton) Producer (Mike Linceton)
Zoo Inc.	Lay Down	1994	Music/Lyrics (Dee Dee Halligan)
