= Bob Marley and the Wailers discography =

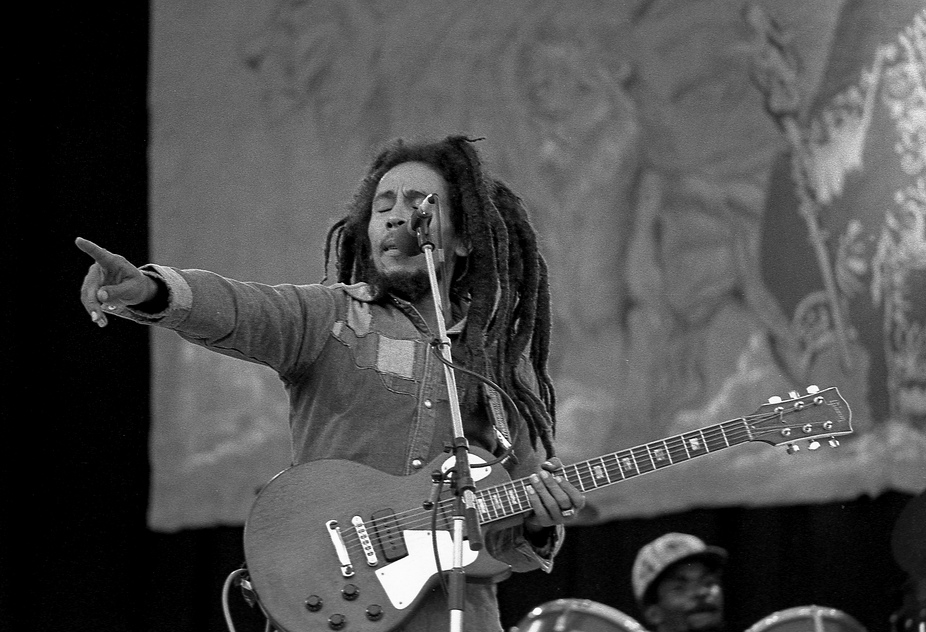
- Bob Marley in concert, 1980.
- Studio albums: 13
- Soundtrack albums: 2
- Live albums: 6
- Compilation albums: 9
- Singles: 133
- Video albums: 2
- Music videos: 32
- Remix albums: 10
- Box sets: 11

Most of Bob Marley's early music was recorded with Peter Tosh and Bunny Wailer, who together with Marley were the most prominent members of the Wailers. In 1972, the Wailers had their first hit outside Jamaica when Johnny Nash covered their song "Stir It Up", which became a UK hit. The 1973 album Catch a Fire was released worldwide, and sold well. It was followed by Burnin', which included the song "I Shot the Sheriff". Eric Clapton's cover of the song became a hit in 1974.

Bob Marley proceeded with Bob Marley and the Wailers, which included the Wailers Band and the I Threes. In 1975, he had his first own hit outside Jamaica with "No Woman, No Cry", from the Live! album. His subsequent albums, including Rastaman Vibration, Exodus, Kaya, Survival and the last album released during his lifetime, Uprising, were big international sellers. Between 1991 and 2007 Bob Marley and the Wailers sold in excess of 21 million records. These statistics did not begin to be collected until ten years after his death.

The Roots Reggae Library has created an overview of the music released by the Wailers prior to their contract with the Island Records label. This overview lists all the Wailers' songs known to have been released during that period, filled into six ska albums and 11 rocksteady albums.

== Albums ==
=== Studio albums ===
Title	Album details	Peak chart positions										Certifications (sales thresholds)
Title	Album details	AUS	AUT	CAN	FRA	NOR	NZ	SWE	UK	US	US R&B	Certifications (sales thresholds)
The Wailing Wailers	Released: 1965; Label: Studio One; Format:	—	—	—	—	—	—	—	—	—	—	
Soul Rebels	Released: December 1970; Labels: Upsetter/Trojan; Format:	—	—	—	—	—	—	—	—	—	—	
Soul Revolution Part II	Released: 1971; Labels: Upsetter/Trojan; Format:	—	—	—	—	—	—	—	—	—	—	
The Best of the Wailers	Recorded: May 1970; Released: August 1971; Label: Beverley's; Format:	—	—	—	—	—	41 (Note: As Shakedown.)	—	—	—	—	
Catch a Fire	Released: 13 April 1973; Labels: Island/Tuff Gong; Format:	—	—	—	—	—	—	—	—	171	51	BPI: Gold; RMNZ: Gold
Burnin'	Released: 19 October 1973; Labels: Island/Tuff Gong; Format:	—	—	—	—	—	—	—	—	151	41	BPI: Silver; RIAA: Gold
Natty Dread	Released: 25 October 1974; Labels: Island/Tuff Gong; Format:	98	—	—	—	—	44	—	43	92	44	BPI: Gold
Rastaman Vibration	Released: 30 April 1976; Labels: Island/Tuff Gong; Format:	68	—	32	12	14	26	45	15	8	11	BPI: Gold; RIAA: Gold
Exodus	Released: 3 June 1977; Labels: Island/Tuff Gong; Format:	88	21	46	20	12	12	14	8	20	15	BPI: 2× Platinum; RIAA: Gold; RMNZ: 3× Platinum
Kaya	Released: 23 March 1978; Labels: Island/Tuff Gong; Format:	5	—	—	—	6	6	14	4	50	50	ARIA: Platinum; BPI: Platinum; RIAA: Gold
Survival	Released: 2 October 1979; Labels: Island/Tuff Gong; Format:	32	—	—	—	10	14	17	20	70	32	BPI: Gold; RMNZ: Gold
Uprising	Released: 10 June 1980; Labels: Island/Tuff Gong; Format:	46	6	—	—	6	1	3	6	45	41	BPI: Gold; RIAA: Gold; RMNZ: 2× Platinum
Confrontation	Released: 23 May 1983; Labels: Island/Tuff Gong; Format:	11	18	—	199	12	6	16	5	55	31	BPI: Silver; RIAA: Gold
"—" denotes releases that did not chart.

=== Live albums ===
Title	Album details	Peak chart positions									Certifications (sales thresholds)
Title	Album details	AUS	NZ	SWE	SWI	UK	US	US World	US R&B	US Reggae	Certifications (sales thresholds)
Live!	Released: 5 December 1975; Labels: Island/Tuff Gong; Format:	51	—	29	—	38	90	—	47	—	BPI: Silver; RIAA: Gold
Babylon by Bus	Released: 10 November 1978; Labels: Island/Tuff Gong; Format:	34	21	44	—	40	102	—	58	—	BPI: Gold
Talkin' Blues	Released: 4 February 1991; Labels: Island/Tuff Gong; Format:	—	30	31	40	—	103	2	—	—	
Live at the Roxy	Released: 24 June 2003; Labels: Island/Tuff Gong; Format:	—	—	—	—	—	—	—	—	5	
Live Forever: September 23, 1980 • Stanley Theatre • Pittsburgh, PA	Released: 2011; Labels: Island/Tuff Gong; Format:	—	—	—	74	—	14	—	4	1	
Easy Skanking in Boston '78	Released: 2015; Labels: Island/Tuff Gong; Format:	—	—	—	—	—	—	—	—	1	
Live at the Rainbow, 1st June 1977	Released: 12 June 2020; Labels: Tuff Gong; Format: Download/Streaming	—	—	—	—	—	—	—	—	—	
Live at the Rainbow, 2nd June 1977	Released: 12 June 2020; Labels: Tuff Gong; Format: Download/Streaming	—	—	—	—	—	—	—	—	—	
Live at the Rainbow, 3rd June 1977	Released: 12 June 2020; Labels: Tuff Gong; Format: Download/Streaming	—	—	—	—	—	—	—	—	—	
Live at the Rainbow, 4th June 1977 (Remastered 2020)	Released: 12 June 2020; Labels: UMC (Universal Music Catalogue); Format: Download/Streaming	—	—	—	—	—	—	—	—	—	
"—" denotes releases that did not chart.

=== Compilation albums ===
Title	Album details	Peak chart positions										Certifications (sales thresholds)
Title	Album details	AUS	FIN	NLD	NOR	NZ	SWE	SWI	UK	US	US Reggae	Certifications (sales thresholds)
African Herbsman	Released: July 1973; Label: Trojan; Format:	—	—	—	—	—	—	—	—	—	—	
Rasta Revolution	Released: 1974; Label: Trojan; Format:	—	—	—	—	—	—	—	—	—	—	
Chances Are	Released: October 1981; Label: Cotillion; Format: Cassette, LP	—	—	—	—	27	—	—	—	—	—	
Legend	Released: 8 May 1984; Labels: Island/Tuff Gong; Formats: Cassette, CD, LP, digital download, Blu-ray	2	11	1	8	1	10	20	1	5	1	RIAA: 18× Platinum (Diamond); ARIA: 6× Platinum; BPI: 16× Platinum; BVMI: Platinum; FIMI: 2× Platinum; IFPI AUT: 2× Platinum; IFPI SWI: 3× Platinum; MC: 2× Platinum; RMNZ: 20× Platinum
Rebel Music	Released: 1986; Labels: Island/Tuff Gong; Format:	—	—	—	—	3	—	—	54	140	—	
Natural Mystic: The Legend Lives On	Released: 23 May 1995; Labels: Island/Tuff Gong; Format:	39	—	24	34	3	14	10	5	67	1	BPI: Gold; RIAA: Gold
One Love: The Very Best of Bob Marley & The Wailers	Released: 22 May 2001; Labels: Island/Tuff Gong; Format:	16	12	3	2	2	2	8	5	60	1	ARIA: Platinum; BPI: Gold
Gold	Released: 11 January 2005; Labels: Island/Tuff Gong; Format:	—	—	—	—	—	—	—	—	—	1	
Africa Unite: The Singles Collection	Released: 8 November 2005; Labels: Island/Tuff Gong; Format:	—	—	66	—	—	9	93	26	101	3	BPI: Gold
"—" denotes releases that did not chart.

=== Remix albums ===
==== Island/Tuff Gong releases ====
Title	Album details	Peak chart positions						Certifications (sales thresholds)
Title	Album details	AUT	NZ	SWI	US	US R&B	US Reggae	Certifications (sales thresholds)
The Never Ending Wailers	Released: 1993; Labels: RAS, Tuff Gong; Formats: CD, LP	—	—	—	—	—	—	
Dreams of Freedom: Ambient Translations in Dub	Released: 23 September 1997; Label: Axiom; Format:	—	—	—	—	—	1	
Chant Down Babylon	Released: 16 November 1999; Label: Island; Formats: CS, CD, LP	49	6	23	60	21	1	BPI: Silver; IFPI SWI: Gold; RIAA: Gold
Roots, Rock, Remixed	Released: 2007; Label: Tuff Gong; Format: CD	—	—	—	—	—	11	
B Is for Bob	Released: 23 June 2009; Label: Tuff Gong; Format: CD	—	—	—	77	—	1	
In Dub, Vol. 1 (Note: Dub compilation originally released in digital-only format in 2010.)	Released: 2012; Label: Tuff Gong; Format: CD	—	—	—	—	—	1	
Legend: Remixed	Released: 2013; Label: Tuff Gong; Format: CD	—	—	—	89	—	1	
"—" denotes releases that did not chart.

=== Box sets ===
Title	Album details	Peak chart positions					Certifications (sales thresholds)
Title	Album details	AUS	UK	US	US R&B	US Reggae	Certifications (sales thresholds)
Songs of Freedom	Released: 21 September 1992; Labels: Island/Tuff Gong; Format:	87	10	86	24	2	BPI: Silver; RIAA: 2× Platinum
The Great Bob Marley	Released: 1993; Label: Goldies; Format: CD	—	—	—	—	—	ARIA: Gold
The Complete Bob Marley & the Wailers 1967–1972	Released: 1997; Label: JAD; Format:	—	—	—	—	4	
Exodus 40: The Movement Continues	Released: 2017; Label: Format: Cassette	—	—	—	—	—	
"—" denotes releases that did not chart.

==== Island/Tuff Gong releases ====
- The Box Set (1982)
- Songs of Freedom (1992)
- Grooving Kingston 12 (2004)
- Fy-ah, Fy-ah (2004)
- Man to Man (2005)

=== Other albums ===
Title	Album details	Peak chart positions					Certifications
Title	Album details	NZ	UK	US	US R&B	US Reggae	Certifications
Interviews	Released: 1982; Labels: Island/Tuff Gong; Format:	—	—	—	—	—	
Marley OST	Released: 2012; Labels: Island/Tuff Gong; Format:	—	81	120	19	1	
Bob Marley: One Love OST	Released: February 9, 2024; Labels: Island/Tuff Gong; Format: CD, LP, digital download, streaming	6	—	—	—	—	RMNZ: Gold
"—" denotes releases that did not chart.

== Singles ==
=== 1960s ===
Year	Title	Album
1962	"Judge Not" / "Do You Still Love Me" (as Robert Marley & Beverley's All-Stars)	Non-album singles
1962	"One Cup of Coffee" / "Snow Boy" (as Bobby Martell) / (Don Drummond & The Skatalites)	Non-album singles
1964	"Simmer Down" / "I Don't Need Your Love"	The Wailing Wailers
1964	"Mr. Talkative" / "It Hurts to Be Alone"	The Wailing Wailers
1964	"I Am Going Home" / "Destiny"	Non-album singles
1964	"Climb Up the Ladder" / "Straight and Narrow"	Non-album singles
1964	"Donna" / "Don't Ever Leave Me"	Non-album singles
1964	"Tell Them Lord" / "Christmas Is Here"	Non-album singles
1964	"Do You Remember" / "Hoot Nanny Hoot"	Non-album singles
1964	"There She Goes" / "Lonesome Feelings"	The Wailing Wailers
1965	"Hooligans" / "Maga Dog"	Non-album singles
1965	"Hooligan Ska" / "Jerico Skank"	Non-album singles
1965	"Habits" / "Amen"	Non-album singles
1965	"Jumbie Jamboree" / "I Should Have Known Better"	Non-album singles
1965	"I Made a Mistake" / "The Vow"	Non-album singles
1965	"Diamond Baby" / "Where's the Girl for Me"	Non-album singles
1965	"Playboy" / "Your Love"	Non-album singles
1965	"Love and Affection" / "Teenager in Love"	The Wailing Wailers
1965	"And I Love Her" / "Do It Right"	Non-album single
1965	"One Love" / "Do You Feel the Same Way Too"	The Wailing Wailers
1965	"Shame & Scandal" / "Sca Balena"	Non-album single
1965	"What's New Pussycat" / "Where Will I Find"	The Wailing Wailers
1965	"I'm Still Waiting" / "Ska Jerk"	The Wailing Wailers
1965	"White Christmas" / "Let the Lord Be Seen in You"	Non-album singles
1965	"Another Dance" / "Somewhere to Lay My Head"	Non-album singles
1965	"Rude Boy" / "Ringo's Theme"	The Wailing Wailers
1966	"I Left My Sins" / "Just in Time"	Non-album single
1966	"(I'm Gonna) Put It On" / "Love Won't Be Mine This Way"	The Wailing Wailers
1966	"Good Good Rudie" / Ocean Eleven	Non-album singles
1966	"Cry to Me" / "Wages of Love"	Non-album singles
1966	"Lonesome Track" / "Sinner Man"	Non-album singles
1966	"Let Him Go" / "Sinner Man"	Non-album singles
1966	"Rasta Shook Them Up" / "Ringo's Ska"	Non-album singles
1966	"Sunday Morning" / "He Who Feels It Knows It"	Non-album singles
1966	"Rock Sweet Rock" / "Jerking Time"	Non-album singles
1966	"Dancing Shoes" / "Don't Look Back"	Non-album singles
1967	"Bend Down Low" / "Freedom Time"	Non-album singles
1967	"Hypocrite" / "Nice Time"	Non-album singles
1967	"Mellow Mood" / "Thank You Lord"	Non-album singles
1967	"Stir It Up" / "This Train"	Non-album singles
1967	"Bus Dem Shut" / "Lyrical Satirical I"	Non-album singles
1968	"Funeral" / "Pound Get a Blow"	Non-album singles
1968	"Stepping Razor" / "I'm Hurting Inside"	Non-album singles
1968	"Play Play Play" / "Don't Rock My Boat"	Non-album singles
1968	"Mus' Get a Beatin'" / "Fire Fire"	Non-album singles
1968	"Chances Are" / "The Lord Will Make a Way"	Non-album singles
1969	"Tread-O"	Non-album singles
1969	"Black Progress"	Non-album singles
1969	"Trouble on the Road Again" / "Comma Comma"	Non-album singles
1969	"Feel Alright" / "Rhythm"	Non-album singles

=== 1970s ===
Title	Year	Peak chart position					Certifications	Album
Title	Year	AUS	NZ	UK	US	US R&B	Certifications	Album
"Oppressor Man"	1970	—	—	—	—	—		Non-album singles
"Hold On to This Feeling"	1970	—	—	—	—	—		Non-album singles
"Adam and Eve" / "Wisdom"	1970	—	—	—	—	—		Non-album singles
"Give Me a Ticket"	1970	—	—	—	—	—		Non-album singles
"Soul Shake Down Party"	1970	—	—	—	—	—		The Best of the Wailers
"Stop the Train" / "Caution"	1970	—	—	—	—	—		The Best of the Wailers
"Soon Come"	1970	—	—	—	—	—		The Best of the Wailers
"Rightful Ruler"	1970	—	—	—	—	—		Non-album single
"My Cup"	1970	—	—	—	—	—		Soul Rebels
"Small Axe"	1970	—	—	—	—	—		Soul Rebels
"More Axe"	1970	—	—	—	—	—		Non-album singles
"Man to Man"	1970	—	—	—	—	—		Non-album singles
"Duppy Conqueror"	1970	—	—	—	—	—		Soul Revolution Part II
"Soul Rebel"	1970	—	—	—	—	—		Soul Rebels
"Kaya"	1971	—	—	—	—	—		Soul Revolution Part II
"All in One"	1971	—	—	—	—	—		Non-album singles
"Secondhand"	1971	—	—	—	—	—		Non-album singles
"Downpressor"	1971	—	—	—	—	—		Non-album singles
"Who Is Mr. Brown"	1971	—	—	—	—	—		Non-album singles
"Dreamland"	1971	—	—	—	—	—		Non-album single
"Send Me That Love" / "Love Light"	1971	—	—	—	—	—		Non-album singles
"Let the Sun Shine on Me" / "I Like It Like This"	1971	—	—	—	—	—		Non-album singles
"Don't Rock My Boat"	1971	—	—	—	—	—		Soul Revolution Part II
"Trenchtown Rock"	1971	—	—	—	—	—		Non-album singles
"Screw Face"	1971	—	—	—	—	—		Non-album singles
"Lively Up Yourself"	1971	—	—	—	—	—		Non-album singles
"Redder than Red"	1971	—	—	—	—	—		Non-album singles
"Concrete Jungle"	1971	—	—	—	—	—		Non-album singles
"Lick Samba"	1971	—	—	—	—	—		Non-album singles
"Guava Jelly"	1971	—	—	—	—	—		Non-album singles
"Craven Choke Puppy"	1971	—	—	—	—	—		Non-album singles
"Back Biter"	1971	—	—	—	—	—		Non-album singles
"Satisfy My Soul Babe"	1971	—	—	—	—	—	RMNZ: Platinum	Non-album singles
"Once Bitten"	1971	—	—	—	—	—		Non-album singles
"Lion"	1971	—	—	—	—	—		Non-album singles
"Here Comes the Sun"	1971	—	—	—	—	—		Non-album singles
"Satisfy My Soul"	1971	—	—	—	—	—		Non-album singles
"Run for Cover" / "Sun Is Shining"	1971	—	—	—	—	—		Non-album singles
"Distant Drums"	1972	—	—	—	—	—		Non-album singles
"African Herbsman" / "Keep On Moving"	1972	—	—	—	—	—		Soul Revolution Part II
"Stir It Up"	1973	—	—	—	—	—	BPI: Gold; RMNZ: Platinum	Catch a Fire
"Concrete Jungle"	1973	—	—	—	—	—		Catch a Fire
"Get Up, Stand Up"	1973	—	49	—	—	—	BPI: Silver; RMNZ: Gold	Burnin'
"I Shot the Sheriff"	1973	—	—	67	—	—	BPI: Silver; RMNZ: Platinum	Burnin'
"Trouble Dub" / "Dub Feeling"	1973	—	—	—	—	—		Non-album singles
"Dog Teeth"	1973	—	—	—	—	—		Non-album singles
"So Jah Seh"	1974	—	—	—	—	—		Natty Dread
"No Woman, No Cry (Live '75)"	1975	97	30	8	—	—	BPI: Platinum	Live!
"Jah Live"	1976	—	—	—	—	—		Non-album single
"Johnny Was"	1976	—	—	—	—	—		Rastaman Vibration
"Roots, Rock, Reggae"	1976	—	—	—	51	37	RMNZ: Gold	Rastaman Vibration
"Positive Vibration"	1976	—	—	—	—	—	RMNZ: Gold	Rastaman Vibration
"Smile Jamaica" (Note: "Smile Jamaica" was released in Jamaica only. The song was slated to be released as a single in the UK on 21 January 1977, but released as a B-side to "Satisfy My Soul" in 1978.)	1976	—	—	—	—	—		Non-album single
"Exodus"	1977	—	—	14	103	19	BPI: Silver; RMNZ: Gold	Exodus
"Waiting in Vain"	1977	—	38	27	—	—	BPI: Gold; RMNZ: 2× Platinum	Exodus
"Jamming" / "Punky Reggae Party"	1977	99	—	9	—	—	BPI: 2× Platinum; RMNZ: 3× Platinum (for "Jamming")	Exodus/non-album single
"Is This Love"	1978	11	8	9	—	—	BPI: 2× Platinum; RMNZ: 6× Platinum	Kaya
"Satisfy My Soul"	1978	—	—	21	—	—	BPI: Silver	Kaya
"So Much Trouble in the World"	1979	—	—	56	—	—	RMNZ: Platinum	Survival
"Survival"	1979	—	—	—	—	—		Survival
"Zimbabwe"	1979	—	—	—	—	—		Survival

=== 1980s ===
Title	Year	Peak chart position						Certifications	Album
Title	Year	JAM Air.	AUS	NZ	UK	US R&B	US Dance	Certifications	Album
"Could You Be Loved"	1980	10	95	2	5	56	6	BPI: 3× Platinum; RMNZ: 9× Platinum	Uprising
"Redemption Song"	1980	*	—	22	—	—	—	BPI: Platinum; RMNZ: 2× Platinum	Uprising
"Three Little Birds"	1980	*	—	—	17	—	—	BPI: 3× Platinum; RMNZ: 6× Platinum	Exodus
"Forever Loving Jah"	1980	*	—	—	—	—	—	RMNZ: Gold	Uprising
"Reggae on Broadway"	1981	*	—	41	—	66	—		Chances Are
"Buffalo Soldier"	1983	*	18	3	4	71	—	BPI: Platinum; RMNZ: 3× Platinum	Confrontation
"One Love/People Get Ready"	1984	*	24	1	5	—	—	BPI: Platinum; RMNZ: 3× Platinum	Exodus
"—" denotes a recording that did not chart or was not released in that territory. "*" denotes that the chart did not exist at that time.

=== 1990s ===
Title	Year	Peak chart position						Certifications	Album
Title	Year	AUS	CAN	NZ	UK	US Bub.	US Dance	Certifications	Album
"Iron Lion Zion"	1992	71	—	2	5	—	—	RMNZ: Gold	Songs of Freedom
"Why Should I" / "Exodus"	1992	193	—	—	42	—	—		Songs of Freedom
"Keep On Moving"	1995	—	—	14	17	—	—		Natural Mystic: The Legend Lives On
"Easy Skanking"	1995	—	—	—	—	—	—	BPI: Silver; RMNZ: Gold	Natural Mystic: The Legend Lives On
"What Goes Around Comes Around"	1996	—	—	—	42	—	—		Non-album singles
"Sun Is Shining" (vs. Funkstar De Luxe)	1999	28	3	11	3	—	1	BPI: Silver	Non-album singles
"Turn Your Lights Down Low" (feat. Lauryn Hill)	1999	69	—	1	15	4	—	BPI: Silver; RMNZ: 3× Platinum	Chant Down Babylon

=== 2000s ===
Title	Year	Peak chart position					Album
Title	Year	AUS	CAN	NZ	UK	US Dance	Album
"Rainbow Country" (vs. Funkstar De Luxe)	2000	62	12	27	11	7	Non-album single
"Jammin'" (with MC Lyte)	2000	—	—	—	42	—	Chant Down Babylon
"I Know a Place"	2001	—	—	—	77	—	One Love: The Very Best of Bob Marley & The Wailers
"Slogans"	2005	—	—	—	45	—	Africa Unite: The Singles Collection
"Africa Unite" (will.i.am remix)	2005	—	—	—	49	—	Africa Unite: The Singles Collection
"Stand Up Jamrock" (Ashley Beedle remix)	2005	—	—	—	56	—	Africa Unite: The Singles Collection

=== 2010s ===
Title	Year	Peak chart position		Certifications	Album
Title	Year	AUS	UK	Certifications	Album
"Is This Love" (featuring Lvndscape and Leon Bolier)	2016	97	16	BPI: Platinum	Non-album single

=== 2020s ===
Title	Year	Peak chart position	Album
Title	Year	JAM Air.	Album
"One Love" (featuring Patoranking)	2020	2	Africa Unite

== Other charted and certified songs ==
List of charted songs, showing year released, chart positions and album name
Title	Year	Peak chart position	Certifications	Album
Title	Year	JAM Air.	Certifications	Album
"No Woman, No Cry"	1974	*	RMNZ: 2× Platinum	Natty Dread
"Who The Cap Fit"	1976	*	RMNZ: Gold	Rastaman Vibration
"Natural Mystic"	1977	2	BPI: Silver; RMNZ: Platinum	Exodus
"Sun Is Shining"	1978	*	RMNZ: Gold	Kaya
"One Drop"	1979	*	RMNZ: Platinum	Survival
"Africa Unite"	1979	*	RMNZ: Gold	Survival
"Ride Natty Ride"	1979	*	RMNZ: Gold	Survival
"Coming In From The Cold"	1980	*	RMNZ: Platinum	Uprising
"Pimper's Paradise"	1980	*	RMNZ: Platinum	Uprising
"*" denotes that the chart did not exist at that time.

== Videos ==
=== Video albums ===
- Live at The Rainbow (1978, Directed by Keith McMillan)
- The Bob Marley Story: Caribbean Nights (1982)

=== Music videos ===
Year	Title	Director(s)	Album
1973	"Stir It Up"		Catch a Fire
1977	"Exodus"	Don Letts and Rick Elgood	Exodus
1978	"Is This Love"		Kaya
1980	"Could You Be Loved"	John Mills	Uprising
1980	"Lively Up Yourself" (live studio)		non-album
1980	"Redemption Song" (live studio)	Mark Robinson	non-album
1983	"Buffalo Soldier"	Bruno Tilley	Confrontation
1984	"One Love/People Get Ready"	Don Letts	Exodus
1984	"Waiting in Vain"	Don Letts	Exodus
1985	"Three Little Birds"		Exodus
1992	"Iron Lion Zion"		Songs of Freedom
1995	"Keep On Moving"	Simon Maxwell	Natural Mystic: The Legend Lives On
1996	"What Goes Around Comes Around"	Cedella Marley	non-album
1999	"Sun Is Shining" (vs. Funkstar De Luxe)	Niels Birkemos	non-album
1999	"Turn Your Lights Down Low" (with Lauryn Hill)	Francis Lawrence	Chant Down Babylon
2000	"Rainbow Country" (vs. Funkstar de Luxe)	Andreas Tibblin	non-album
2000	"Jammin'" (with MC Lyte)	Frank Sacramento	Chant Down Babylon
2001	"Soul Shakedown Party" (remix)	Martin Smith	non-album
2001	"I Know a Place (Where We Can Carry On)"		One Love: The Very Best of Bob Marley & The Wailers
2005	"Slogans"	Adrian Moat	Africa Unite: The Singles Collection
2016	"Is This Love" (with Lvndscape and Leon Bolier)		non-album
2019	"Easy Skanking"		Kaya
2019	"Satisfy My Soul"	Brian Kazez	Kaya
2020	"Redemption Song" (animated)	Octave Marsal and Théo de Gueltzl	Uprising
2020	"Three Little Birds" (animated)		Exodus
2020	"No Woman, No Cry (Live at The Lyceum, London 1975)"	Kristian Mercado Figueroa	Live!
2021	"Jamming (Tropkillaz Remix)" (with Tiwa Savage)	Sara Serna	non-album
2021	"Jamming"		Exodus
2022	"Could You Be Loved" (animated)	Vanja Vikalo	Uprising
2022	"Stir It Up" (with Sarkodie)		non-album
2023	"Them Belly Full (But We Hungry)" (with Rema and Skip Marley)		non-album
2024	"One Love/People Get Ready" (animated)		Exodus

== Sources ==
- Kazo (29 January 2009), Bob Marley and the Wailers: Compared discography (PDF)
