= One Love: The Very Best of Bob Marley & the Wailers =

Compilation album by Bob Marley and the Wailers
- Released: 22 May 2001
- Recorded: 1973–1980
- Genre: Reggae
- Length: 135:45
- Labels: Island, Universal, Tuff

Bob Marley and the Wailers chronology
| Chant Down Babylon (1999) | One Love: The Very Best of Bob Marley & the Wailers (2001) | Live at the Roxy (2003) |

Professional ratings
Review scores
| Source | Rating |
|---|---|
| AllMusic | 4.5/5 stars |

One Love: The Very Best of Bob Marley & the Wailers is a compilation album of Bob Marley and the Wailers songs that was released on the Island Records label in 2001.

== Track listing ==
=== Disc One ===
1. "Stir It Up" (from Catch a Fire)
2. "Get Up, Stand Up" (from Burnin')
3. "I Shot the Sheriff" (from Burnin')
4. "Lively Up Yourself" (from Natty Dread)
5. "No Woman, No Cry" [Live] (from Live!)
6. "Roots, Rock, Reggae" (from Rastaman Vibration)
7. "Exodus" [Single Version] (from Exodus)
8. "Jamming" (from Exodus)
9. "Waiting in Vain" (from Exodus)
10. "Three Little Birds" (from Exodus)
11. "Turn Your Lights Down Low" (from Exodus)
12. "One Love/People Get Ready" (from Exodus)
13. "Is This Love" (from Kaya)
14. "Sun Is Shining" (from Kaya)
15. "So Much Trouble in the World" (from Survival)
16. "Could You Be Loved" (from Uprising)
17. "Redemption Song" [Band Version] (original version on Uprising)
18. "Buffalo Soldier" [Single Version] (from Confrontation)
19. "Iron Lion Zion" (from Natural Mystic: The Legend Lives On)
20. "I Know a Place" [Single Remix] (Previously Unreleased)

=== Disc Two ===
1. "Concrete Jungle" (from Catch a Fire)
2. "Burnin' and Lootin'" (from Burnin')
3. "Rebel Music (3 O'Clock Roadblock)" (from Natty Dread)
4. "Jah Live" (from Jah Live single)
5. "Positive Vibration" (from Rastaman Vibration)
6. "Smile Jamaica" (from Iron Lion Zion single)
7. "Natural Mystic" (from Exodus)
8. "Punky Reggae Party" (from Jamming single)
9. "Satisfy My Soul" (from Kaya)
10. "Africa Unite" (from Survival)
11. "Coming In from the Cold" (from Uprising)
12. "Rastaman Live Up!" (from Confrontation)
13. "Who Colt the Game" (Previously Unreleased)

== Year-end charts ==
Year-end chart performance for One Love: The Very Best of Bob Marley & the Wailers
| Chart (2001) | Position |
|---|---|
| Canadian Albums (Nielsen SoundScan) | 90 |
| Canadian R&B Albums (Nielsen SoundScan) | 20 |

== Certifications ==
| Region | Certification | Certified units/sales |
|---|---|---|
| Argentina (CAPIF) | Platinum | 40,000^{^} |
| Australia (ARIA) | Platinum | 70,000^{^} |
| Belgium (BRMA) | Gold | 25,000^{*} |
| Brazil (Pro-Música Brasil) | Gold | 50,000^{*} |
| Canada (Music Canada) | Platinum | 100,000^{^} |
| Denmark (IFPI Danmark) | Gold | 25,000^{^} |
| Italy (FIMI) | Platinum | 100,000^{*} |
| Japan (RIAJ) | Platinum | 200,000^{^} |
| Netherlands (NVPI) | Platinum | 80,000^{^} |
| New Zealand (RMNZ) | Platinum | 15,000^{^} |
| Spain (Promusicae) | Platinum | 100,000^{^} |
| Sweden (GLF) | Gold | 40,000^{^} |
| Switzerland (IFPI Switzerland) | Gold | 20,000^{^} |
| United Kingdom (BPI) | Gold | 100,000^{^} |
| United States | — | 131,000 |
Summaries
| Europe (IFPI) | Platinum | 1,000,000^{*} |
^{*} Sales figures based on certification alone.^{^} Shipments figures based on certification alone.
