= Bob Marley: One Love (soundtrack) =

Soundtracks to the 2024 film

Bob Marley: One Love is a 2024 biographical musical drama film directed by Reinaldo Marcus Green based on the life of reggae singer and songwriter Bob Marley. Two soundtracks were released for the film, through Marley's in-house record label Tuff Gong along with Island Records. The first album, the original motion picture soundtrack featuring songs performed by Bob Marley and the Wailers was released on February 9, 2024. The second, an extended play featuring covers of the band's songs, was released on February 14, 2024.

== Background ==
The music from Bob Marley: One Love consisted of songs curated from Marley's archival recordings used throughout the film. Kingsley Ben-Adir performed all the songs as a singer and guitarist for his role as Marley, where the final edit blends with the archival recordings of the film.

Kris Bowers composed the film's score collaborating with Green for the fourth time following Monsters and Men (2018), King Richard (2021) and the television miniseries We Own This City (2022). Bowers was involved from the very beginning, as Green engaged him during the pre-production so that he could sketch the compositions and orchestration. Marley's music was used as a foundation for the film's score with Green wanted it to be organic, but also allow certain moments to be emotional. Bowers recorded and mixed the album without the use of modern sound technologies so that each instrumentation could be heard and experienced accordingly.

== Bob Marley: One Love (Original Motion Picture Soundtrack) ==
Bob Marley: One Love (Original Motion Picture Soundtrack)

Soundtrack album by Bob Marley and the Wailers
- Released: February 9, 2024
- Length: 74:54
- Labels: Tuff Gong; Island

Bob Marley and the Wailers chronology
| Marley (2012) | Bob Marley: One Love (2024) |

Bob Marley: One Love (Original Motion Picture Soundtrack) is the soundtrack to the 2024 film released through Tuff Gong and Island Records on February 9, 2024. It featured 17 tracks from the film, which consisted of the songs performed by Bob Marley and the Wailers. Most of the songs were drawn from Catch a Fire (1973), Burnin' (1973), Rastaman Vibration (1976), Exodus (1977), Kaya (1978) and Uprising (1980). The album further featured stage performances of the band which were released in the multi-platinum certified compilation album Legend (1984).

=== Track listing ===
| No. | Title | Artist(s) | Length |
|---|---|---|---|
| 1. | "Get Up, Stand Up" | The Wailers | 3:18 |
| 2. | "Roots, Rock, Reggae" | Bob Marley and the Wailers | 3:37 |
| 3. | "I Shot the Sheriff" | The Wailers | 4:42 |
| 4. | "No More Trouble" | Bob Marley and the Wailers | 3:58 |
| 5. | "War/No More Trouble" | Bob Marley and the Wailers | 4:57 |
| 6. | "So Jah S'eh" | Bob Marley and the Wailers | 7:32 |
| 7. | "Natural Mystic" | Bob Marley and the Wailers | 3:28 |
| 8. | "Turn Your Lights Down Low" | Bob Marley and the Wailers | 3:40 |
| 9. | "Exodus" | Bob Marley and the Wailers | 7:39 |
| 10. | "Jamming" | Bob Marley and the Wailers | 3:32 |
| 11. | "Concrete Jungle" | Bob Marley and the Wailers | 4:12 |
| 12. | "No Woman, No Cry" (Live at the Rainbow Theatre, London on 4 June 1977) (Remastered 2020) | Bob Marley and the Wailers | 7:01 |
| 13. | "Three Little Birds" | Bob Marley and the Wailers | 3:01 |
| 14. | "Redemption Song" | Bob Marley and the Wailers | 3:47 |
| 15. | "One Love / People Get Ready" | Bob Marley and the Wailers | 2:51 |
| 16. | "Is This Love" | Bob Marley and the Wailers | 3:53 |
| 17. | "Rastaman Chant" | The Wailers | 3:46 |
| Total length: | | | 74:54 |

=== Charts ===
==== Weekly charts ====
Weekly chart performance for Bob Marley: One Love (Original Motion Picture Soundtrack)
| Chart (2024) | Peak position |
|---|---|
| Japanese Albums (Oricon) | 36 |
| Japanese Hot Albums (Billboard Japan) | 35 |
| New Zealand Albums (RMNZ) | 6 |
| UK Album Downloads (Official Charts) | 28 |
| UK Soundtrack Albums (Official Charts) | 9 |

==== Year-end charts ====
Year-end chart performance for Bob Marley: One Love (Original Motion Picture Soundtrack)
| Chart (2025) | Position |
|---|---|
| New Zealand Albums (RMNZ) | 26 |

=== Certifications ===
Certifications for Bob Marley: One Love (Original Motion Picture Soundtrack)
| Region | Certification | Certified units/sales |
|---|---|---|
| Italy (FIMI) | Gold | 25,000^{‡} |
| New Zealand (RMNZ) | Gold | 7,500^{‡} |
^{‡} Sales+streaming figures based on certification alone.

== Bob Marley: One Love (Music Inspired by the Film) ==
Bob Marley: One Love (Music Inspired by the Film)

EP by various artists
- Released: February 14, 2024
- Length: 26:26
- Labels: Tuff Gong; Island
- Producers: Ditweni; Salaam Remi; OzMoses Arktex; Daniel Caesar; P2J; Rykeyz; Ian Fitchuk; Tainy; Ghetto; OneSix; Daramola; We Good; Z3N

Singles from Bob Marley: One Love (Music Inspired by the Film)
- 1. "Three Little Birds" Released: January 26, 2024; 2. "Waiting in Vain" Released: February 4, 2024; 3. "Redemption Song" Released: February 10, 2024

Bob Marley: One Love (Music Inspired by the Film) is the soundtrack extended play to the 2024 film, consisting cover versions of Bob's songs performed by Kacey Musgraves, Wizkid, Jessie Reyez, Leon Bridges, Daniel Caesar, Bloody Civilian and Marley's grandson Skip Marley. The deluxe version of the soundtrack was released two days later, on February 16, 2024. It contains additional cover versions of Bob's songs performed by other artists, consisting of Farruko, Marley's granddaughter Mystic Marley and Shenseea. Musgraves' version of "Three Little Birds" preceded as the lead single from the EP released on January 26, 2024, followed by Caesar's cover of "Waiting in Vain" and Bridges' cover of "Redemption Song" as the second and third singles on February 4 and 10. The seven-song EP is set to be released on February 14, 2024, the same day as the film.

The deluxe version of the soundtrack received the 2025 Grammy Award for Best Reggae Album.

=== Track listing ===
Standard edition
| No. | Title | Artist(s) | Length |
|---|---|---|---|
| 1. | "Natural Mystic" | Bloody Civilian | 2:53 |
| 2. | "Exodus" | Skip Marley | 4:19 |
| 3. | "Waiting in Vain" | Daniel Caesar | 5:01 |
| 4. | "Three Little Birds" | Kacey Musgraves | 4:01 |
| 5. | "One Love" | Wizkid | 3:04 |
| 6. | "Is This Love" | Jessie Reyez | 3:25 |
| 7. | "Redemption Song" | Leon Bridges | 3:40 |
| Total length: | | | 26:26 |

Deluxe version
| No. | Title | Artist(s) | Length |
|---|---|---|---|
| 8. | "Rasta Reggae (Jamming)" | Farruko | 3:07 |
| 9. | "Misty Morning" | Mystic Marley | 3:04 |
| 10. | "No Woman No Cry" | Shenseea | 3:16 |
| Total length: | | | 35:55 |

== Reception ==
Julian Roman of MovieWeb described the music as "soul-stirring" and "enjoyable". Lovia Gyarkye of The Hollywood Reporter reported that the use of Marley's original tracks in the concert sequences "activates the nostalgic potential of the film". Negatively, Owen Gleiberman of Variety, felt the songs to be "generic", "baffling and weirdly unsatisfying". Patrick Gibbs of SLUG Magazine complimented Bowers' score as "a major highlight that deserves to be heard on a top-quality sound system", whereas The Independent-based critic Clarisse Loughrey in contrast, felt that the score is "filled with unnecessary orchestral flourishes".
