= Songs of Freedom =

Box set by Bob Marley and the Wailers
- Released: 21 September 1992
- Recorded: 1961–1980
- Genre: Reggae
- Length: 299:11
- Label: Tuff Gong

Bob Marley and the Wailers chronology
Talkin' Blues (1991)	Songs of Freedom (1992)	Natural Mystic (1995)

Professional ratings
Review scores
Source	Rating
AllMusic	4/5 stars
Baltimore Sun	4/4 stars
Rolling Stone	5/5 stars
Select	4/5 stars

Songs of Freedom is a four-disc box set containing music by Bob Marley and the Wailers, from Marley's first song "Judge Not", recorded in 1961, to a live version of "Redemption Song", recorded in 1980 at his last concert.

The song "Iron Lion Zion" was first released on this compilation, in what is often considered the original mix (although the original is said to not have included the harmony vocals from the I-Threes). The single releases (and subsequent compilation releases) use a remix which was created for the single using modern production, which sounds very different.

"Why Should I" was remixed for this compilation and released as a single. The original wasn't released until the JAD/Universal box set Man To Man in 2004. The original was recorded in 1971 and features Peter Tosh and Bunny Wailer's backing vocals, which were replaced by The I-Threes on the remix.

It is said to be complementary to the greatest hits compilation Legend, in the sense that any of the tracks with the same names are presented in different versions from the normal single mixes on Legend - as an example see the number of 12" mixes in the track listing below. The exceptions are the original versions of "Get Up, Stand Up" and "Easy Skanking", the latter appearing on the 2002 Deluxe Edition remaster.

== Track listing ==
=== Disc one ===
No.	Title	Writer(s)	Original release	Length
1.	"Judge Not"	Bob Marley	non-album single (1962)	2:26
2.	"One Cup of Coffee"	Bill Brock, arr. B. Marley	non-album single (1962)	2:34
3.	"Simmer Down"	B. Marley	The Wailing Wailers (1965)	2:50
4.	"I'm Still Waiting"	B. Marley	The Wailing Wailers (1965)	3:07
5.	"One Love/People Get Ready" (original)	B. Marley, Curtis Mayfield	The Wailing Wailers (1965)	3:21
6.	"Put It On"	B. Marley	The Wailing Wailers (1965)	3:08
7.	"Bus Dem Shut (Pyaka)"	B. Marley	single (1967)	2:47
8.	"Mellow Mood" (original)	B. Marley	single (1967)	3:31
9.	"Bend Down Low"	B. Marley	single (1967)	2:30
10.	"Hypocrites"	B. Marley	single (1967)	2:36
11.	"Stir It Up" (original)	B. Marley	single (1967)	3:13
12.	"Nice Time"	B. Marley	single (1967)	2:44
13.	"Thank You Lord" (original)	B. Marley	single (1967)	3:41
14.	"Hammer"	B. Marley	previously unreleased demo (1968)	2:57
15.	"Caution"	B. Marley	The Best of The Wailers (1970)	2:45
16.	"Back Out"	B. Marley	The Best of The Wailers (1970)	2:18
17.	"Soul Shake Down Party"	B. Marley	The Best of The Wailers (1970)	3:06
18.	"Do It Twice"	B. Marley	The Best of The Wailers (1970)	2:49
19.	"Soul Rebel"	B. Marley	Soul Rebels (1970)	3:19
20.	"Sun Is Shining"	B. Marley	Soul Revolution Part II (1971)	2:11
21.	"Don't Rock My Boat"	B. Marley	Soul Revolution Part II (1971)	4:32
22.	"Small Axe"	B. Marley	single (1971)	3:57
23.	"Duppy Conqueror"	B. Marley	single (1971)	3:39
24.	"Mr. Brown"	B. Marley	single (1971)	3:32

=== Disc two ===
No.	Title	Writer(s)	Original release	Length
1.	"Screwface"	B. Marley	single (1971)	2:23
2.	"Lick Samba"	B. Marley	single (1971)	2:33
3.	"Trenchtown Rock" (alternative mix)	B. Marley	single (1971)	3:28
4.	"Craven Choke Puppy"	B. Marley	single (1971)	2:52
5.	"Guava Jelly"	B. Marley	single (1971)	2:18
6.	"Acoustic Medley" (medley of "Guava Jelly", "This Train", "Cornerstone", "Comma Comma", "Dew Drops", "Stir It Up" and "I'm Hurting Inside")	B. Marley	previously unreleased JAD audition (1971)	12:09
7.	"I'm Hurting Inside" (alternative mix)	B. Marley	previously unreleased, from an unfinished JAD album (1971)	3:29
8.	"High Tide or Low Tide"	B. Marley	previously unreleased outtake from Catch a Fire (1972)	4:09
9.	"Slave Driver"	B. Marley	Catch a Fire (1972)	2:51
10.	"No More Trouble"	B. Marley	Catch a Fire (1972)	3:59
11.	"Concrete Jungle"	B. Marley	Catch a Fire (1972)	4:11
12.	"Get Up, Stand Up"	B. Marley, Peter Tosh	Burnin' (1973)	3:14
13.	"Rastaman Chant"	Traditional, arr. The Wailers	Burnin' (1973)	3:51
14.	"Burnin' and Lootin'"	B. Marley	Burnin' (1973)	4:13
15.	"Iron Lion Zion" (original)	B. Marley	previously unreleased recording for this release (1973)	2:55
16.	"Lively Up Yourself"	B. Marley	Natty Dread (1974)	5:11
17.	"Natty Dread"	B. Marley	Natty Dread (1974)	3:34
18.	"I Shot the Sheriff" (live)	B. Marley	Live! (1975)	5:26

=== Disc three ===
No.	Title	Writer(s)	Original release	Length
1.	"No Woman No Cry" (live at The Roxy)	Vincent Ford	previously unreleased at the time, though later appears on the live release Live at the Roxy (1976)	5:22
2.	"Who the Cap Fit"	Aston Barrett, Carlton Barrett	Rastaman Vibration (1976)	4:41
3.	"Jah Live"	B. Marley, Lee Perry	single (1975); later added to the remastered edition of Rastaman Vibration (1976)	4:15
4.	"Crazy Baldheads"	R. Marley, Ford	Rastaman Vibration (1976)	3:10
5.	"War"	Cole, C. Barrett	Rastaman Vibration (1976)	3:36
6.	"Johnny Was"	R. Marley	Rastaman Vibration (1976)	3:46
7.	"Rat Race"	R. Marley	Rastaman Vibration (1976)	2:49
8.	"Jamming" (12-inch mix)	B. Marley	remix of track from Exodus (1977)	5:45
9.	"Waiting in Vain" (advert mix)	B. Marley	previously unreleased remix of track from Exodus (1977)	3:59
10.	"Exodus" (12-inch mix)	B. Marley	remix of track from Exodus (1977)	7:25
11.	"Natural Mystic"	B. Marley	Exodus (1977)	3:26
12.	"Three Little Birds" (alternate mix)	B. Marley	alternate version of track from Exodus (1977)	2:56
13.	"Running Away"	B. Marley	Kaya (1978)	4:14
14.	"Keep on Moving" (London version)	C. Mayfield	outtake from an unreleased Lee Perry album (1978), first released on the "One Love/People Get Ready" 12-inch single (1984)	5:44
15.	"Easy Skanking"	B. Marley	Kaya (1978)	2:55
16.	"Is This Love" (horns mix)	B. Marley	alternate mix of track from Kaya (1978)	4:00
17.	"Smile Jamaica"	B. Marley, Perry	non-album single (1976); later added to deluxe edition of Rastaman Vibration (1976)	3:13
18.	"Time Will Tell"	B. Marley	Kaya (1978)	3:32

=== Disc four ===
No.	Title	Writer(s)	Original release	Length
1.	"Africa Unite"	B. Marley	Survival (1979)	2:54
2.	"Survival"	B. Marley	Survival (1979)	3:52
3.	"One Drop"	B. Marley	Survival (1979)	3:51
4.	"One Dub"	B. Marley	Survival (One Drop" b-side) (1979)	3:53
5.	"Zimbabwe"	B. Marley	Survival (1979)	3:47
6.	"So Much Trouble in the World"	B. Marley	Survival (1979)	3:57
7.	"Ride Natty Ride" (12-inch mix)	B. Marley	remix of the track from Survival (1979)	6:22
8.	"Babylon System"	B. Marley	Survival (1979)	4:18
9.	"Coming in from the Cold" (12-inch mix)	B. Marley	remix of the track from Uprising (1980)	6:04
10.	"Real Situation"	B. Marley	Uprising (1980)	3:08
11.	"Bad Card"	B. Marley	Uprising (1980)	2:48
12.	"Could You Be Loved" (12-inch mix)	B. Marley	remix of the track from Uprising (1980)	5:26
13.	"Forever Loving Jah"	B. Marley	Uprising (1980)	3:50
14.	"Rastaman Live Up"	B. Marley	Confrontation (1983)	5:21
15.	"Give Thanks and Praises"	B. Marley	Confrontation (1983)	3:14
16.	"One Love/People Get Ready" (12-inch mix)	B. Marley, Mayfield	remix of track from Exodus (1977)	7:08
17.	"Why Should I"	B. Marley	previously unreleased recording, which The I-Threes were on the remix for this release. (1992)	3:33
18.	"Redemption Song" (live in Pittsburgh)	B. Marley	previously unreleased at the time, though later appears on the live release Live in Pittsburgh (1980)	4:08

== Charts ==
Chart performance for Songs of Freedom
Chart (1992)	Peak position
Australian Albums (ARIA)	87
Dutch Albums (Album Top 100)	44
UK Albums (Official Charts)	10
US Billboard 200	86
