= Natural Mystic (disambiguation) =

Natural Mystic may refer to:

- "Natural Mystic", a song by Bob Marley and the Wailers from Exodus
- Natural Mystic: The Legend Lives On, a compilation album by Bob Marley & The Wailers
