= Natural Mystic: The Legend Lives On =

Compilation album by the Wailers
- Released: 23 May 1995
- Recorded: Various
- Genre: Reggae
- Length: 54:56
- Label: Tuff Gong/Island
- Producers: Bob Marley & The Wailers, Alex Sadkin, Steve Smith, Chris Blackwell, Lee Perry

The Wailers chronology
Songs of Freedom (1992)	Natural Mystic: The Legend Lives On (1995)	21 Winners: The Best of Bob Marley and the Wailers (1997)

Professional ratings
Review scores
Source	Rating
AllMusic	4/5 stars
NME	8/10

Natural Mystic: The Legend Lives On is a collection of album tracks by Bob Marley, and is an addendum to the 1984 compilation album, Legend.

== Lyrics ==
The material on Legend consists mainly of love songs with a few of Marley's more politicized and religious themed works; the selection on Natural Mystic therefore attempts to redress the balance. On the opening title track, he warns of how "one and all got to face reality now" in a world of massive upheaval and change. Other songs explore salvation through oneness ("Africa Unite"), the greed that propels the world towards an inevitable Armageddon ("So Much Trouble In The World") and Marley's own role as a persecuted leader ("Iron Lion Zion"). The inclusion of "Easy Skanking" shows a meditative and laid-back Marley, partaking in Jamaica's most profitable cash crop during a spiritual time-out amidst the chaos of everyday life.

All tracks have been digitally remastered on GOLD version.

== Alternative versions ==
To give Natural Mystic some individuality from its previous counterparts, the compilers placed an alternate extended cut of "Crazy Baldhead" in which more emphasis was given to the "silly noises" breakdown. They also included the remix of Bob Marley's late 1970s rendition of "Keep on Moving" featuring the vocals of Aswad and released exclusively for the UK market in 1984. The new remix, which was intended strictly for this particular album project, was fashioned in the same way "Iron Lion Zion" was done for Songs of Freedom, and at the ending of "One Drop", the song is an alternate version and it plays a noise, possibly the noise at the ending of Bob Marley & The Wailers's "Satisfy My Soul" [released 1978 on the album "Kaya" by Tuff Gong/Island].

== Credits ==
Original Producers: Bob Marley & The Wailers, Alex Sadkin, Steve Smith, Chris Blackwell and Lee Perry.
Compilation producers: Chris Blackwell, Trevor Wyatt and Bill Levenson.

== Track listing ==
=== Original album (1995) ===
No.	Title	Writer(s)	Original release	Length
1.	"Natural Mystic"	Bob Marley	Exodus (1977)	3:26
2.	"Easy Skanking"	B. Marley	Kaya (1978)	2:55
3.	"Iron Lion Zion" (New Mix)	B. Marley	Songs of Freedom (1992)	3:14
4.	"Crazy Baldhead" (Extended)	Rita Marley, Vincent Ford	Rastaman Vibration (1976)	3:23
5.	"So Much Trouble in the World"	B. Marley	Survival (1979)	3:57
6.	"War"	Allan Cole, Carlton Barrett	Rastaman Vibration (1976)	3:31
7.	"Africa Unite"	B. Marley	Survival (1979)	2:54
8.	"Trenchtown Rock" (Live)	B. Marley	Live! (1975)	4:10
9.	"Keep on Moving" (1995 Mix)	Curtis Mayfield	Songs of Freedom (1992)	4:21
10.	"Sun Is Shining"	B. Marley	Kaya (1978)	4:36
11.	"Who the Cap Fit" (Edit)	Aston Barrett, C. Barrett	Rastaman Vibration (1976)	4:17
12.	"One Drop"	B. Marley	Survival (1979)	3:51
13.	"Roots, Rock, Reggae" (Edit)	Ford	Rastaman Vibration (1976)	3:31
14.	"Pimper's Paradise"	B. Marley	Uprising (1980)	3:27
15.	"Time Will Tell"	B. Marley	Kaya (1978)	3:30

=== The Definitive Remastered edition (2002) ===
No.	Title	Writer(s)	Original release	Length
1.	"Natural Mystic"	Bob Marley	Exodus (1977)	3:26
2.	"Easy Skanking"	B. Marley	Kaya (1978)	2:55
3.	"Iron Lion Zion" (New Mix)	B. Marley	Songs of Freedom (1992)	3:14
4.	"Crazy Baldhead" (Extended)	Rita Marley, Vincent Ford	Rastaman Vibration (1976)	3:23
5.	"So Much Trouble in the World"	B. Marley	Survival	3:57
6.	"War"	Allan Cole, Carlton Barrett	Rastaman Vibration (1976)	3:31
7.	"Africa Unite"	B. Marley	Survival (1979)	2:54
8.	"Trenchtown Rock" (Live)	B. Marley	Live! (1975)	4:10
9.	"Keep on Moving" (1995 Mix)	Curtis Mayfield	Songs of Freedom (1992)	4:21
10.	"Sun Is Shining"	B. Marley	Kaya (1978)	4:36
11.	"Who the Cap Fit" (Edit)	Aston Barrett, C. Barrett	Rastaman Vibration (1976)	4:17
12.	"One Drop"	B. Marley	Survival (1979)	3:51
13.	"Roots, Rock, Reggae" (Edit)	Ford	Rastaman Vibration (1976)	3:31
14.	"Pimper's Paradise"	B. Marley	Uprising (1980)	3:27
15.	"Positive Vibration" (Bonus Track)	Ford	Rastaman Vibration (1976)	3:30
16.	"Time Will Tell"	B. Marley	Kaya (1978)	3:30

== Charts ==
=== Weekly charts ===
Weekly chart performance for Natural Mystic: The Legend Lives On
Chart (1995)	Peak
Australian Albums (ARIA)	39
Austrian Albums (Ö3 Austria)	37
Belgian Albums (Ultratop Flanders)	18
Belgian Albums (Ultratop Wallonia)	19
Canada Top Albums/CDs (RPM)	13
Dutch Albums (Album Top 100)	24
German Albums (Offizielle Top 100)	32
New Zealand Albums (RMNZ)	3
Swedish Albums (Sverigetopplistan)	14
Swiss Albums (Schweizer Hitparade)	10
UK Albums (Official Charts)	5

2001 chart performance for Natural Mystic: The Legend Lives On
Chart (2001)	Peak
French Albums (SNEP)	141

=== Year-end charts ===
1995 year-end chart performance for Natural Mystic: The Legend Lives On
Chart (1995)	Rank
New Zealand Albums (Recorded Music NZ)	46
Spanish Albums (AFYVE)	46

== Certifications and sales ==
Certifications and sales for Natural Mystic: The Legend Lives On
Region	Certification	Certified units/sales
Argentina (CAPIF)	Gold	30,000^{^}
France (SNEP)	Gold	100,000^{*}
New Zealand (RMNZ)	Gold	7,500^{^}
Spain (Promusicae)	Gold	50,000^{^}
Switzerland (IFPI Switzerland)	Gold	25,000^{^}
United Kingdom (BPI)	Gold	100,000^{^}
United States (RIAA)	Gold	500,000^{^}
Summaries
Europe (IFPI)	Platinum	1,000,000^{*}
^{*} Sales figures based on certification alone.^{^} Shipments figures based on certification alone.
