= Slogans (song) =

Single by Bob Marley

from the album Africa Unite: The Singles Collection
- Released: 2005
- Recorded: 1980
- Genre: Reggae
- Length: 4:03
- Label: Tuff Gong, Island
- Songwriter(s): Bob Marley
- Producer(s): Bob Marley & The Wailers, Chris Blackwell, Nancy Jeffries and Bill Levenson

Bob Marley singles chronology
"I Know a Place" (2001)	"Slogans" (2005)	"Africa Unite" (2005)

"Slogans" is a remixed version of Bob Marley song released 24 years after his death. The 2005 single was released on the greatest hits album Africa Unite: The Singles Collection and was the second last song on the album.

== Background ==
The song, originally titled "Can't Take Them Slogans No More" appears on a 1980 home recording cassette. Recording such 'idea' tapes was common in Marley's career, and many circulate in bootleg and online form. This, however, is the only song from this particular tape released so far. Whilst more have been speculated to be released in future, details are limited.

The song was recorded 1980 and has only Bob Marley and a drum machine on the recording, however other artists were overdubbed onto the song to make it sound like a complete Bob Marley & The Wailers song. Eric Clapton plays guitar on this recording. Whilst the performance was considered respectful by many longtime fans (unlike previous attempts to modernise Marley's sound, such as the single versions of "I Know A Place" and "Iron Lion Zion"), the chord sequence of the overdubbed backing track resembles No Woman No Cry.

Slogans spent two weeks on the UK Official Singles Chart, peaking at number 45 in December 2005.
