= Legend (Bob Marley and the Wailers album) =

Greatest hits album by Bob Marley and the Wailers
- Released: 7 May 1984
- Recorded: 1972–1983
- Genre: Roots reggae
- Length: 51:01
- Labels: Tuff Gong; Island
- Producers: Bob Marley; Chris Blackwell; Errol Brown; Steve Smith; The Wailers

Bob Marley and the Wailers chronology
Confrontation (1983)	Legend (1984)	Bob, Peter, Bunny & Rita (1985)

Legend is a compilation album by Bob Marley and the Wailers. It was released on 7 May 1984 by Island Records. It is a greatest hits collection of singles in its original vinyl format and is the best-selling reggae album of all time, with more than 18 million copies sold in the US, more than 3.3 million in the UK (where it is the 17th-best-selling album) and an estimated 27 million copies sold globally. In 2003, the album was ranked number 46 in Rolling Stone magazine's list of the "500 Greatest Albums of All Time" and maintained the ranking in a 2012 revised list.

As of November 2026, Legend has spent a total of 965 nonconsecutive weeks on the US Billboard 200 albums chart—the second-longest run in the chart's history. Also, as of November 2026, it has spent 1,260 weeks in the top 100 of the UK Albums Chart—the third-longest run in that chart's history.

== Content ==
The album contains all ten of Bob Marley's Top 40 hit singles in the UK up to the time, plus three songs from the original Wailers with Peter Tosh and Bunny Livingston in "Stir It Up", "I Shot the Sheriff" and "Get Up, Stand Up", along with "Redemption Song", the closing song from the album Uprising. Of the original tracks, only four date from prior to the Exodus album.

The cassette tape release of the album featured two extra songs, "Punky Reggae Party", the B-side of the "Jamming" single, and "Easy Skanking" from the Kaya album. A second-generation compact disc remastered by Barry Diament appeared in 1990 on the Tuff Gong label. Although the disc includes the same 14 songs, the tracks are in their original album lengths rather than the edited versions for single release.

On 12 February 2002, the expanded 14-track edition with songs at album lengths were remastered for compact disc with a bonus disc consisting of 1984-vintage remixes for extended dance club singles and dub versions. In 2004, the Legend double-disc deluxe edition was reissued with the music DVD of the same name in the sound + vision deluxe edition. In 2010, Legend was made available as downloadable content for Rock Band, but without the track "Get Up, Stand Up", which was later included on Rock Band 3. In June 2012, a high fidelity audiophile version of the album was released on HDtracks in 96 kHz/24bit and 192 kHz/24bit resolutions. Bruno Tilley was the Art Director & Creative Consultant for the sleeve design work.

== Reception ==
Professional ratings
Review scores
Source	Rating
AllMusic	5/5 stars
Robert Christgau	A
Pitchfork	9.0/10
Q	5/5 stars
Sputnikmusic	5/5 stars

Legend has peaked at number 5 on the Billboard 200, making it Marley's highest-charting album in the US. It also holds the distinction of being the second-longest-charting album in the history of Billboard magazine. Combining its chart life on the Billboard 200 and the Billboard Catalog Albums charts, Legend has had a chart run of 2165 nonconsecutive weeks, surpassed only by Pink Floyd's The Dark Side of the Moon at 2166 nonconsecutive weeks. As of the Billboard issue dated 21 November 2026, the album has charted on the Billboard 200 for 965 nonconsecutive weeks, and is only the second album to spend at least 900 weeks on the chart (the first being Pink Floyd's 1973 studio album, The Dark Side of the Moon). As of December 2017, Legend has sold 12.3 million copies in the US since 1991 when SoundScan started tracking album sales, making it the ninth best-selling album of the Nielsen SoundScan era. The RIAA has certified Legend for selling 18 million copies, a total that includes purchases before 1991.

In the United Kingdom, Legend has been certified 13× Platinum, and is the 16th-best-selling album of all time in that country, with sales of over 3,380,000 as of July 2016. As of 4 November 2026, the album has spent 1,260 weeks in the top 100 of the official UK Albums Chart, placing it third on the all-time longevity list.

As of April 2012, the album has sold more than 25 million copies worldwide.

Despite its generally positive reception, Legend has been criticized for being a deliberately inoffensive selection of Marley's less political music, shorn of any radicalism that might damage sales. In 2014 in the Phoenix New Times, David Accomazzo wrote "Dave Robinson, who constructed the tracklist for Legend, [said that] the tracklist for Legend deliberately was designed to appeal to white audiences. Island Records had viewed Marley as a political revolutionary, and Robinson saw this perspective as damaging to Marley's bottom line. So he constructed a greatest-hits album that showed just one face of the Marley prism, the side he deemed most sellable to the suburbs. [...] If you're looking for mass-market appeal to secular-progressive America, you don't include songs that invoke collective guilt over the slave trade, nor do you address the inconvenient truth that the bucolic Jamaican lifestyle of reggae, sandy beaches, and marijuana embraced by millions of college freshmen, exists only because of the brutal slave trade. [...] the songs on Legend offer just a brief glimpse into his music. The definitive album of the most important reggae singer of all time is a hodgepodge collection of love songs, feel-good sentiment, and mere hints of the fiery activist whose politics drew bullets in the '70s." Vivien Goldman wrote in 2015, "when he does get played on the radio now, it's the mellow songs, not the angry songs, that get heard – the ones that have been compiled on albums such as Legend."

== Track listings ==
When first released in the US in 1984, pressings contained remixes of "No Woman, No Cry," "Buffalo Soldier," "Waiting In Vain," "Exodus" and "Jammin'," done in 1984 by Eric Thorngren. (International pressings substituted the remixes for either album versions or 7" edits.) Two versions of the CD were released in Europe in 1984; one used the same mastering as the US pressing, the other (mastered by Barry Diament) used original full length versions for all the tracks. Pressings from 1986 on used the international version of the release until 2002, when a two-disc deluxe version released by Universal replaced all tracks with their respective album versions (except for "No Woman, No Cry," which is the full length version from the "Live!" album) and included the two extra tracks from the cassette release as bonus tracks. That version was released individually as part of "The Definitive Remasters" series. When track No. 13 [Exodus, released on the album "Exodus" by Bob Marley & The Wailers in 1977 by Tuff Gong/Island] begins, the noise at the ending of Bob Marley's "Satisfy My Soul" [released on the album "Kaya" by Bob Marley & The Wailers in 1978 by Tuff Gong/Island] plays at the start.

=== Original 1984 American album ===
Side one
No.	Title	Writer(s)	Original release	Length
1.	"Is This Love"	Bob Marley	Kaya (1978)	3:52
2.	"No Woman, No Cry" (Live)	Vincent Ford	Live! (1975)	4:05
3.	"Could You Be Loved" (7" Edit)	Marley	Uprising (1980)	3:33
4.	"Three Little Birds"	Marley	Exodus (1977)	2:56
5.	"Buffalo Soldier" (Remix)	Marley, Noel Williams	Confrontation (1983)	5:24
6.	"Get Up, Stand Up"	Marley, Peter Tosh	Burnin' (1973)	3:17
7.	"Stir It Up" (Edit)	Marley	Catch a Fire (1973)	3:38
Total length:				26:45

Side two
No.	Title	Writer(s)	Original release	Length
1.	"One Love/People Get Ready" (Remix)	Marley, Curtis Mayfield	Exodus (1977)	2:52
2.	"I Shot the Sheriff" (Edit)	Marley	Burnin' (1973)	3:46
3.	"Waiting in Vain" (Remix)	Marley	Exodus (1977)	4:10
4.	"Redemption Song"	Marley	Uprising (1980)	3:48
5.	"Satisfy My Soul" (7" Edit)	Marley	Kaya (1978)	3:45
6.	"Exodus" (Remix)	Marley	Exodus (1977)	5:24
7.	"Jamming" (Remix)	Marley	Exodus (1977)	3:17
Total length:				27:02

=== Original compact disc version ===
No.	Title	Writer(s)	Original release	Length
1.	"Is This Love"	Bob Marley	Kaya (1978)	3:50
2.	"No Woman, No Cry" (Live)	Vincent Ford	Live! (1975)	7:08
3.	"Could You Be Loved"	Marley	Uprising (1980)	3:57
4.	"Three Little Birds"	Marley	Exodus (1977)	3:00
5.	"Buffalo Soldier" (7" Edit)	Marley, Noel Williams	Confrontation (1983)	2:43
6.	"Get Up, Stand Up"	Marley, Peter Tosh	Burnin' (1973)	3:17
7.	"Stir It Up" (Edit)	Marley	Catch a Fire (1973)	3:38
8.	"One Love/People Get Ready"	Marley, Curtis Mayfield	Exodus (1977)	2:52
9.	"I Shot the Sheriff" (Edit)	Marley	Burnin' (1973)	3:46
10.	"Waiting in Vain"	Marley	Exodus (1977)	4:16
11.	"Redemption Song"	Marley	Uprising (1980)	3:48
12.	"Satisfy My Soul"	Marley	Kaya (1978)	4:30
13.	"Exodus" (7" Edit)	Marley	Exodus (1977)	4:16
14.	"Jamming" (7" Edit)	Marley	Exodus (1977)	3:17
Total length:				54:18

=== 2002 Deluxe edition ===
Disc one: Legend remastered
No.	Title	Writer(s)	Original release	Length
1.	"Is This Love"	Bob Marley	Kaya (1978)	3:50
2.	"No Woman, No Cry" (Live At The Lyceum, London/1975)	Vincent Ford	Live! (1975)	7:08
3.	"Could You Be Loved"	Marley	Uprising (1980)	3:57
4.	"Three Little Birds"	Marley	Exodus (1977)	3:00
5.	"Buffalo Soldier"	Marley, Noel Williams	Confrontation (1983)	4:18
6.	"Get Up, Stand Up"	Marley, Peter Tosh	Burnin' (1973)	3:17
7.	"Stir It Up"	Marley	Catch a Fire (1973)	5:30
8.	"Easy Skanking" (Bonus Track)	Marley	Kaya (1978)	2:57
9.	"One Love / People Get Ready"	Marley, Curtis Mayfield	Exodus (1977)	2:52
10.	"I Shot the Sheriff"	Marley	Burnin' (1973)	4:40
11.	"Waiting in Vain"	Marley	Exodus (1977)	4:16
12.	"Redemption Song"	Marley	Uprising (1980)	3:48
13.	"Satisfy My Soul"	Marley	Kaya (1978)	4:31
14.	"Exodus"	Marley	Exodus (1977)	7:40
15.	"Jamming"	Marley	Exodus (1977)	3:31
16.	"Punky Reggae Party" (Bonus Track)	Marley, Lee Perry	B-side of "Jamming" (1977)	6:52
Total length:				1:11:49

Disc two: The Legend remixes
No.	Title	Original release	Length
1.	"One Love / People Get Ready" (Extended Version, remixed by Julian Mendelsohn)	"One Love / People Get Ready" UK 1984 12" (cat. no. 12IS 169)	6:59
2.	"Waiting in Vain" (Remixed by Julian Mendelsohn)	"Waiting in Vain" UK 1984 12" (cat. no. 12IS 180)	5:54
3.	"Jamming" (Remixed by Paul "Groucho" Smykle)	"Could You Be Loved" UK 1985 12" (cat. no. 12IS 210)	5:33
4.	"Three Little Birds / Three Little Birds (Dub Version)" (Remixed by Julian Mendelsohn)	"Three Little Birds" UK 1985 12" (cat. no. 12IS 236)	5:18
5.	"Could You Be Loved" (remixed by Errol Brown and Alex Sadkin)	"Could You Be Loved" UK 1985 12" (cat. no. 12IS 210)	5:25
6.	"No Woman No Cry" (Remixed by Eric "E.T." Thorngren)	"Could You Be Loved" UK 1985 12" (cat. no. 12IS 210)	4:10
7.	"Coming in from the Cold" (remixed by Eric "E.T." Thorngren)	"Could You Be Loved" UK 1985 12" (cat. no. 12IS 210)	5:42
8.	"Buffalo Soldier" (Remixed by Eric "E.T." Thorngren)	Legend (1984, U.S. version)	2:52
9.	"Jamming" (Remixed by Eric "E.T." Thorngren)	Legend (1984, U.S. version)	3:20
10.	"Waiting in Vain" (remixed by Eric "E.T." Thorngren)	Legend (1984, U.S. version)	4:11
11.	"Exodus" (Remixed by Eric "E.T." Thorngren)	Legend (1984, U.S. version)	8:48
12.	"Lively Up Yourself" (Remixed by Eric "E.T." Thorngren)	previously unreleased	5:16
13.	"One Love / People Get Ready" (Dub Version, Remixed by Godwin Logie)	"One Love / People Get Ready" UK 1984 12" (cat. no. 12 ISX 169)	4:55
Total length:			1:08:23

=== Legend: Remixed (2013) ===
No.	Title	Length
1.	"Waiting in Vain" (Jim James Remix)	5:04
2.	"Stir It Up" (Ziggy Marley Remix)	3:34
3.	"Three Little Birds" (Stephen Marley and Jason Bentley Remix)	3:00
4.	"Could You Be Loved" (RAC Remix)	4:04
5.	"No Woman, No Cry" (Stephen Marley Remix)	4:41
6.	"Get Up Stand Up" (Thievery Corporation Remix)	4:21
7.	"Satisfy My Soul" (Beats Antique Remix)	6:11
8.	"I Shot the Sheriff" (Roni Size Remix)	5:55
9.	"Exodus" (Pretty Lights Remix)	4:16
10.	"Easy Skanking" (Stephen Marley Remix)	4:56
11.	"One Love / People Get Ready" (Photek Remix)	4:57
12.	"Redemption Song" (Ziggy Marley Remix)	3:54
13.	"Is This Love" (Jason Bentley Remix)	6:10
14.	"Jamming" (Nickodemus and Zeb Remix)	4:53
15.	"Punky Reggae Party" (Z-Trip featuring Lee "Scratch" Perry Remix)	5:34
16.	"Buffalo Soldier" (Stephen Marley Remix)	5:15
Total length:		1:16:45

=== 30th anniversary edition (2014) ===
In celebration of the 30th anniversary, the compilation was re-released (as its "The Definitive Remasters" form) in two formats:

- A tri-color (red, yellow, green) double 180g vinyl set
- A CD/Blu-ray 5.1 audio set; the Blu-ray disc contains the studio version of "No Woman, No Cry" and previously unheard alternate takes of "Easy Skanking" and "Punky Reggae Party."

== Charts ==
=== Weekly charts ===
Weekly chart performance for Legend
Chart (1984–2015)	Peak position
Australian Albums (Kent Music Report)	2
Australian Albums (ARIA)	14
Austrian Albums (Ö3 Austria)	5
Belgian Albums (Ultratop Flanders)	14
Belgian Albums (Ultratop Wallonia)	6
Canadian Albums (Billboard)	23
Canadian Albums (Billboard) Legend: Remixed	11
Dutch Albums (Album Top 100)	1
Finnish Albums (Suomen virallinen lista)	11
French Albums (SNEP)	67
German Albums (Offizielle Top 100)	11
Italian Albums (FIMI)	35
New Zealand Albums (RMNZ)	1
Norwegian Albums (VG-lista)	8
Spanish Albums (Promusicae)	41
Swedish Albums (Sverigetopplistan)	10
UK Albums (Official Charts)	1
UK R&B Albums (Official Charts)	4
Billboard 200 (Billboard)	5
US Digital Albums (Billboard)	3
US Top R&B/Hip-Hop Albums (Billboard)	34
US Reggae Albums (Billboard)	1
US Top Catalog Albums (Billboard)	1
US R&B/Hip-Hop Catalog Albums (Billboard)	1

Chart (2016–2023)	Peak position
Scottish Albums (Official Charts)	4

Chart (2024–2025)	Peak position
Greek Albums (IFPI)	3
Irish Albums (Official Charts)	5
Swiss Albums (Schweizer Hitparade)	20

=== Year-end charts ===
Year-end chart performance for Legend
Chart (1984)	Position
Australian Albums (Kent Music Report)	21
Austrian Albums (Ö3 Austria)	18
Dutch Albums (Album Top 100)	13
German Albums (Offizielle Top 100)	57
New Zealand Albums (RMNZ)	9
UK Albums (OCC)	3
Chart (1991)	Position
Dutch Albums (Album Top 100)	7
New Zealand Albums (RMNZ)	41
UK Albums (OCC)	64
Chart (1993)	Position
UK Albums (OCC)	95
Chart (1994)	Position
Australian Albums (ARIA)	49
Chart (1995)	Position
UK Albums (OCC)	85
Chart (1997)	Position
Belgian Albums (Ultratop Wallonia)	75
Chart (1999)	Position
UK Albums (OCC)	92
Chart (2000)	Position
Australian Albums (ARIA)	89
Canadian Albums (Nielsen SoundScan)	97
UK Albums (OCC)	76
Chart (2003)	Position
UK Albums (OCC)	130
Chart (2007)	Position
UK Albums (OCC)	174
Chart (2008)	Position
New Zealand Albums (RMNZ)	49
UK Albums (OCC)	106
Chart (2009)	Position
Swedish Albums (Sverigetopplistan)	94
UK Albums (OCC)	119
Chart (2010)	Position
UK Albums (OCC)	195
US Billboard 200	145
Chart (2011)	Position
Belgian Albums (Ultratop Wallonia)	35
UK Albums (OCC)	189
US Billboard 200	149
Chart (2012)	Position
UK Albums (OCC)	114
US Billboard 200	128
Chart (2013)	Position
Belgian Albums (Ultratop Flanders)	94
Belgian Albums (Ultratop Wallonia)	156
UK Albums (OCC)	126
US Billboard 200	112
Chart (2014)	Position
Belgian Albums (Ultratop Flanders)	135
Belgian Albums (Ultratop Wallonia)	162
US Billboard 200	77
Chart (2015)	Position
Belgian Albums (Ultratop Flanders)	107
Belgian Albums (Ultratop Wallonia)	165
Dutch Albums (Album Top 100)	90
US Billboard 200	70
Chart (2016)	Position
Dutch Albums (Album Top 100)	86
New Zealand Albums (RMNZ)	44
UK Albums (OCC)	31
US Billboard 200	81
Chart (2017)	Position
UK Albums (OCC)	38
US Billboard 200	73
US Top R&B/Hip-Hop Albums (Billboard)	47
Chart (2018)	Position
Irish Albums (IRMA)	39
UK Albums (OCC)	38
US Billboard 200	78
US Top R&B/Hip-Hop Albums (Billboard)	46
Chart (2019)	Position
Belgian Albums (Ultratop Flanders)	86
Belgian Albums (Ultratop Wallonia)	104
New Zealand Albums (RMNZ)	40
UK Albums (OCC)	48
US Billboard 200	61
US Top R&B/Hip-Hop Albums (Billboard)	32
Chart (2020)	Position
Belgian Albums (Ultratop Flanders)	126
Belgian Albums (Ultratop Wallonia)	141
Irish Albums (IRMA)	33
New Zealand Albums (RMNZ)	16
UK Albums (OCC)	21
US Billboard 200	60
US Top R&B/Hip-Hop Albums (Billboard)	36
Chart (2021)	Position
Belgian Albums (Ultratop Flanders)	130
Belgian Albums (Ultratop Wallonia)	138
Irish Albums (IRMA)	26
UK Albums (OCC)	30
US Billboard 200	60
US Top R&B/Hip-Hop Albums (Billboard)	32
Chart (2022)	Position
Belgian Albums (Ultratop Flanders)	185
UK Albums (OCC)	26
US Billboard 200	77
US Top R&B/Hip-Hop Albums (Billboard)	41
Chart (2023)	Position
UK Albums (OCC)	49
US Billboard 200	66
US Top R&B/Hip-Hop Albums (Billboard)	34
Chart (2024)	Position
Belgian Albums (Ultratop Flanders)	150
Belgian Albums (Ultratop Wallonia)	127
UK Albums (OCC)	30
US Billboard 200	51
US Top R&B/Hip-Hop Albums (Billboard)	18
Chart (2025)	Position
UK Albums (OCC)	49
US Billboard 200	82
US Top R&B/Hip-Hop Albums (Billboard)	27

=== Decade-end charts ===
Decade-end chart performance for Legend
Chart (2010–2019)	Position
UK Albums (OCC)	47
US Billboard 200	144

== Certifications ==
=== Album ===
Certifications for Legend album
Region	Certification	Certified units/sales
Argentina (CAPIF)	4× Platinum	240,000^{^}
Australia (ARIA)	6× Platinum	420,000^{‡}
Austria (IFPI Austria)	2× Platinum	100,000^{*}
Belgium (BRMA)	4× Platinum	200,000^{*}
Canada (Music Canada)	2× Platinum	200,000^{^}
Finland (Musiikkituottajat)	Gold	36,703
France (SNEP)	Diamond	1,000,000^{*}
Germany (BVMI)	Platinum	500,000^{^}
Italy (FIMI) Sales since 2002	3× Platinum	150,000^{‡}
Netherlands (NVPI)	Platinum	100,000^{^}
New Zealand (RMNZ)	20× Platinum	300,000^{^}
Norway (IFPI Norway)	Gold	25,000^{*}
Poland (ZPAV)	Gold	50,000^{*}
Spain (Promusicae)	Platinum	100,000^{^}
Sweden (GLF)	Gold	50,000^{^}
Switzerland (IFPI Switzerland)	3× Platinum	150,000^{^}
United Kingdom (BPI)	16× Platinum	4,800,000^{‡}
United States (RIAA)	18× Platinum	18,000,000^{‡}
United States (RIAA) Bob Marley: The Legend Live	Gold	500,000^{^}
Summaries
Worldwide	—	25,000,000
^{*} Sales figures based on certification alone.^{^} Shipments figures based on certification alone.^{‡} Sales+streaming figures based on certification alone.

=== Video ===
Certifications for Legend video
Region	Certification	Certified units/sales
Argentina (CAPIF)	8× Platinum	64,000^{^}
Australia (ARIA)	Platinum	15,000^{^}
France (SNEP)	Platinum	20,000^{*}
Germany (BVMI)	Gold	25,000^{^}
New Zealand (RMNZ)	2× Platinum	10,000^{^}
Switzerland (IFPI Switzerland)	Gold	3,000^{^}
United Kingdom (BPI)	Gold	25,000^{^}
United States (RIAA)	Platinum	100,000^{^}
^{*} Sales figures based on certification alone.^{^} Shipments figures based on certification alone.

== See also ==
- List of best-selling albums
- List of best-selling albums in France
- List of best-selling albums in New Zealand
- List of best-selling albums in the United Kingdom
- List of best-selling albums in the United States
