= Rasta Revolution =

Compilation album by Bob Marley and the Wailers
- Released: 1974
- Recorded: 1970–71
- Genre: Reggae
- Length: 30:07
- Label: Trojan
- Producer: Lee Perry

Bob Marley and the Wailers chronology
Burnin' (1973)	Rasta Revolution (1974)	Natty Dread (1974)

Rasta Revolution is a compilation album by Bob Marley and the Wailers released by Trojan in 1974. It consists of most of Soul Rebels, as well as the 7" version of "Duppy Conqueror", recorded during the album's sessions (although an alternate version appeared on Soul Revolution Part II instead), and "Mr. Brown", an alternate version of the former.

Professional ratings
Review scores
Source	Rating
AllMusic	link

== Track listing ==
Side one

1. "Mr. Brown" - 3:33
2. "Soul Rebel" - 3:19
3. "Try Me" - 2:47
4. "It's Alright" - 2:36
5. "No Sympathy" - 2:13
6. "My Cup" - 3:37
7. "Duppy Conqueror" - 3:46

Side two

1. "Rebel's Hop" - 2:40
2. "Corner Stone" - 2:30
3. "400 Years" - 2:34
4. "No Water" - 2:10
5. "Reaction" - 2:42
6. "Soul Almighty" - 2:43

Current CD Version

1. "Mr. Brown" - 3:33
2. "Soul Rebel" - 3:19
3. "Try Me" - 2:47
4. "It's Alright" - 2:36
5. "No Sympathy" - 2:13
6. "My Cup" - 3:37
7. "Duppy Conqueror" - 3:46
8. "Rebel's Hop" - 2:37
9. "Corner Stone" - 2:30
10. "400 Years" - 2:34
11. "No Water" - 2:10
12. "Reaction" - 2:42
13. "Soul Almighty" - 2:43
