= Interviews (album) =

Compilation album by Bob Marley
- Released: 1982
- Recorded: 1970–1980
- Genre: Reggae
- Label: Tuff Gong

Bob Marley chronology
Chances Are (1981)	Interviews (1982)	Confrontation (1983)

Interviews is a Bob Marley interview album, with excerpts from songs. He is interviewed by Neville Willoughby. This was released by Tuff Gong in 1982 but did not receive an international Island release.

== Track listing ==
=== Side one ===
1. "Natural Mystic"
2. "Trenchtown Rock"
3. "Redemption Song"
4. "Babylon System"
5. "Buffalo Soldier"
6. "Time Will Tell"

=== Side two ===
1. "Natural Mystic"
2. "Revolution"
3. "Survival"
4. "One Drop"
5. "Roots, Rock, Reggae"
6. "Guava Jelly"
7. "Rat Race"
