= Family Man (musician) =

Jamaican musician (1946–2024)

Aston Barrett CD
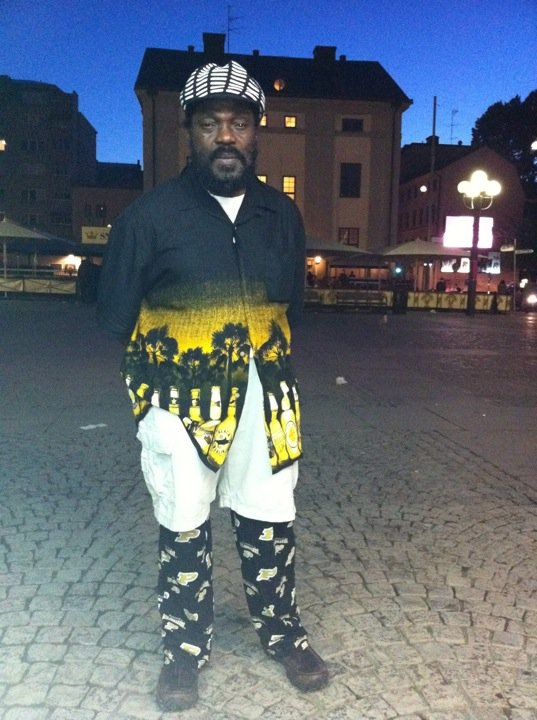
- Barrett in 2011

Background information
- Also known as: Family Man
- Born: Aston Francis Barrett; 22 November 1946; Kingston, Jamaica
- Died: 3 February 2024 (aged 77) Miami, Florida, U.S.
- Genres: Reggae
- Occupations: Songwriter; musician; arranger; record producer
- Instruments: Bass guitar; guitar; keyboards; percussions
- Years active: 1962–2019
- Formerly of: Bob Marley & The Wailers; Burning Spear; Lee "Scratch" Perry; King Tubby; Augustus Pablo; Peter Tosh; Bunny Wailer; Alpha Blondy; The Agrovators

Aston Francis Barrett, CD (22 November 1946 – 3 February 2024), often called "Family Man" or "Fams" for short, was a Jamaican musician and Rastafarian. He was best known as the bass-guitar bandleader of Bob Marley and The Wailers, as well as co-producer of the albums, and the man in charge of the overall song arrangements.

== Early life ==
Aston Francis Barrett was born on 22 November 1946 in Kingston, Jamaica. He was the fourth of five children, and first son, of Wilfred and Violet Barrett.

Barrett sang along to soul music as a child, then learned the bass, building his first bass guitar from scratch. As young men, Barrett and his younger brother Carlton earned a meager income as welders while doing session work on the side.

== Career ==
Along with his brother Carlton on drums, Barrett went on to play with Bob Marley & The Wailers, The Hippy Boys and Lee Perry's The Upsetters.

=== Mentorship ===
Barrett was the mentor and teacher of Robbie Shakespeare of the duo Sly & Robbie.

=== Equipment ===
Barrett played a Fender Jazz Bass and used Acoustic 370 and Ampeg SVT bass amplifiers.

=== Island Records dispute ===
In 2006 Barrett filed a lawsuit against Island Records, the Wailers' label, seeking £60 million in unpaid royalties allegedly due him and his now deceased brother. The lawsuit was dismissed. The arguments by Island-Universal and the Marley family was that Barrett surrendered his rights to any further royalties in a 1994 settlement in exchange for several hundred thousand dollars. The judge agreed. As a result, he faced about £2 million in legal costs for the trial, forcing him to sell two homes in Jamaica.

== Personal life and death ==
=== Nickname ===
Barrett's "Family Man" nickname came about before he had any children of his own. Barrett foresaw his role as a band leader and started to call himself "Family Man". He subsequently fathered 41 children: 23 daughters and 18 sons. He also claimed to have 23 grandchildren and two great-grandchildren.

=== Death ===
Barrett died of heart failure after a series of strokes in Miami, Florida on 3 February 2024, at the age of 77.

== Influence ==
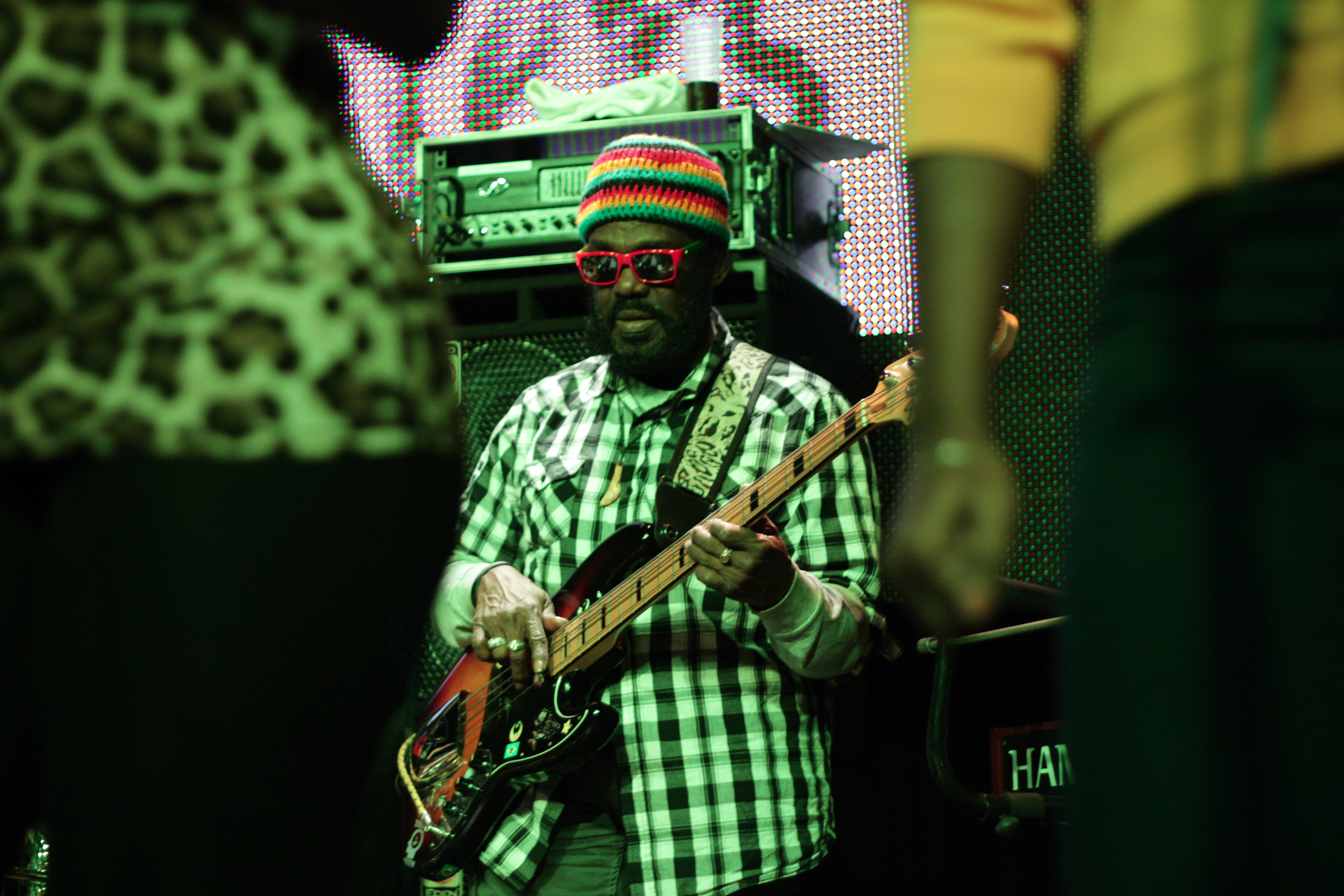
Barrett in 2012

Bass Player magazine has commented that "Perhaps no music evokes the notion of bass and bass tone like reggae and dub, and no two words are more synonymous with those plucking practices than Family Man." Ali Campbell, frontman of UB40, credits Aston Barrett and his brother as the inventors of reggae as we know it, stating, "There was bluebeat, rocksteady and ska. That all happened before reggae, which kind of happened in about ’69, you know — when reggae as we know it was invented by the Barrett brothers, I’d say." Rock musician John Lennon expressed admiration for the unique bass sound originating from Jamaica, while discussing his plans for a comeback album in early 1980 while listening to the Bob Marley & The Wailers album Burnin', stating, "You couldn't get that sound in New York. No way!"

Ziggy Marley, eldest son of Bob Marley, emphasizes the significance of Aston Barrett's bass alongside Carlton's drumming in his father's music, noting, "They have their own style." Keith Richards of The Rolling Stones acknowledges the Wailers' rapid improvement with Barrett's addition on bass. Robbie Shakespeare of Sly & Robbie fame hailed Barrett as a master bassist, attributing much of his own success to Barrett's influence.

== Awards and recognition ==
- 2012: Lifetime Achievement award from Bass Player Magazine
- 2020: Selected as number one by the staff of Bass Player Magazine, in their ranking of "20 legendary players who shaped the sound of electric bass"
- 2021: Received the Jamaican Order of Distinction

== Discography (selected) ==
=== Compilations ===
- Familyman in Dub [197X]

=== As producer ===
- Aston Barrett – Familyman in Dub [197X]
- Horace Andy & Winston Jarrett & Wailers – The Kingston Rock [1974]
- Various Artists – Cobra Style [197X]
- Various Artists – Juvenile Delinquent [1981]

=== As engineer ===
- Bob Marley and the Wailers – Confrontation [1983]
- Bob Marley and the Wailers – Exodus [1977]
- Judy Mowatt- Black Woman [1980]

=== As musician ===
- Aston Barrett – Familyman in Dub [197X]
- Alpha Blondy & Wailers – Jerusalem [1986]
- Keith Hudson – Pick A Dub [1974]
- Bob Marley and the Wailers – Catch a Fire (1973)
- Bob Marley and the Wailers – I Shot the Sheriff
- Bob Marley and the Wailers – Jamming
- Bob Marley and the Wailers – Three Little Birds
- Augustus Pablo – King Tubbys Meets Rockers Uptown (1976)
- Burning Spear – Marcus Garvey (1975)
- Burning Spear – Dry & Heavy (1977)
- Burning Spear – Marcus' Children – originally released as Social Living (1978)
- Peter Tosh – Legalize It [1976]
