= Exodus (Bob Marley and the Wailers album) =

Studio album by Bob Marley and the Wailers
- Released: 3 June 1977
- Recorded: 1976; January–April 1977
- Studios: Harry J. Studio (Kingston, Jamaica); Island (London)
- Genre: Reggae
- Length: 37:24
- Labels: Island; Tuff Gong (reissue)
- Producers: Bob Marley and the Wailers

Bob Marley and the Wailers chronology
Rastaman Vibration (1976)	Exodus (1977)	Kaya (1978)

Singles from Exodus
- 1. "Exodus" Released: 1977; 2. "Waiting in Vain" Released: 1977; 3. "Jamming" Released: 3 June 1977; 4. "Three Little Birds" Released: August 1980; 5. "One Love/People Get Ready" Released: 16 April 1984

Exodus is the ninth studio album by Jamaican reggae band Bob Marley and the Wailers, first released in June 1977 through Island Records, following Rastaman Vibration (1976). The album's production has been characterized as laid-back with pulsating bass beats and an emphasis on piano, trumpet and guitar. Unlike previous albums from the band, Exodus thematically moves away from cryptic story-telling; instead it revolves around themes of change, religious politics, and sexuality. The album is split into two halves: the first half revolves around religious politics, while the second half is focused on themes of making love and keeping faith.

On 3 December 1976, an assassination attempt was made on Bob Marley's life in which his chest was grazed and his arm was struck with a bullet, but he survived. Following the assassination attempt, Marley left Jamaica and moved to London, where Exodus was recorded.

The album was a success both critically and commercially; it received gold certifications in the US, UK and Canada, and was the album that propelled Marley to international stardom. In 2017, Exodus was remastered and re-released for its 40th anniversary. There are more tracks from Exodus on Marley’s greatest hits compilation Legend than from any of his other records. Exodus was his tenth album since the debut album The Wailing Wailers in 1965, including the live album Live! (1975).

== Background ==
In 1974, two of the original Wailers, Peter Tosh and Bunny Wailer, left the band. The band continued releasing material as "Bob Marley & The Wailers," as had sometimes been the case in the Lee Perry era (as with the Soul Rebels and Soul Revolution LPs). His current backing band included brothers Carlton and Aston "Family Man" Barrett on drums and bass respectively, Al Anderson and Junior Marvin on lead guitar, Tyrone Downie and Earl "Wya" Lindo on keyboards, and Alvin "Seeco" Patterson on percussion. The I Threes, consisting of Judy Mowatt, Marcia Griffiths, and Marley's wife Rita Marley provided backing vocals. In 1975, Marley had his international breakthrough with his first hit outside Jamaica, "No Woman, No Cry", from the Natty Dread album. This was followed by his breakthrough album in the United States, Rastaman Vibration (1976), which became the 48th best-selling album on the Billboard Soul Charts in 1978.

== Conception ==
Marley had conceived "Exodus" as the album title before even writing the song.

In December 1976, Jamaica was going through elections, generating substantial political discourse. In his campaign, Prime Minister Michael Manley used the campaign slogan "We know where we're going." In response Marley wrote "Exodus", which is the title track of the album. The song became a No. 1 hit in Jamaica as well as the United Kingdom and Germany.

On 3 December 1976, while he was in his house in Jamaica, an assassination attempt on Marley's life drove him out of his native country: two days after the assassination attempt, Marley performed in the previously scheduled Smile Jamaica concert, then subsequently fled to England where he later recorded the song "Exodus". In addition to the assassination attempt on Marley, his wife Rita was also shot and survived.

== No. 1 hit single ==
The song "Exodus" became a No. 1 hit in Jamaica as well as a top 20 hit in the United Kingdom where it reached number 14, and Germany.

== Music ==
Exodus is a reggae album that features a "laid-back" production and a "stoned atmosphere that's simultaneously funky and political" according to Cam, an Emeritus from Sputnikmusic.

Cam described the album's musical style as being "different", noting that Marley's style of reggae was not what was prominent in Jamaica during the time, and that the album's music sounds unlike any reggae that came before its release. Emeritus continued to describe the album's sound as being rooted in the blues and soul, with elements of British Rock with a reggae "façade thrown on top" however Emeritus praised this saying "if Exodus was straight reggae, it probably wouldn't be as good as it is."

Exodus contains elements of pulsating bass beats, pianos and funk along with a "liquid-y bass", drumming and guitars with the inclusion of trumpets in the title track. Unlike previous albums Exodus lyrical content moves away from cryptic story-telling and instead is clearer and more straight forward, the lyrics touch upon themes of change, religious politics and sex. Vocally, Marley provides a minimalist approach, trying not to reach his falsettos.

The album's track listing is split over two halves; the first half features songs of religious politics and opens with "Natural Mystic", which is a slow tempo "fade up" song, followed by "So Much Things to Say", which was described by the BBC as being "exuberant" and features a reggae scat. The following two songs "Guiltiness" and "The Heathen" explore darker territory, before ending on the album's title track.

The second half of the album features songs revolving around sex and keeping faith.

== Critical reception ==
Professional ratings
Review scores
Source	Rating
AllMusic	4.5/5 stars
Billboard	(favorable)
Christgau's Record Guide	B+
Pitchfork	(8.4/10)
PopMatters	(favorable)
Sputnikmusic	5/5

Cam from Sputnikmusic gave the album five out of five stars, calling it a "classic". Emeritus praised the album's "laid-back tones" and commended Marley's vocals and lyrical content. As described by Rolling Stone magazine, Exodus is an album with "the magnificent rhythm section of Aston Barrett, bass, and Carlton Barrett, drums, and the spidery lead guitar of Julian "Junior" Marvin" contradicting the "flatness" of the material Marley has given them to work with

"Jamming", "Waiting in Vain", "One Love/People Get Ready", and "Three Little Birds" were all major international hits. Exodus peaked at number 20 on the Billboard 200 and at number 15 on the Black Albums chart, as well as remaining in the UK charts for 56 consecutive weeks, where it peaked at number 8.

In 1999, Time named Exodus the best album of the 20th century. In 2001, the TV network VH1 named it the 26th greatest album of all time. In 2003, the album was ranked number 169 on Rolling Stone magazine's list of the 500 greatest albums of all time, maintaining the rating in a 2012 revised list, and re-ranking at number 48 in a 2020 revised list.

== Track listing ==
All tracks written by Bob Marley.

=== 1977 original release ===
Side one
No.	Title	Length
1.	"Natural Mystic"	3:28
2.	"So Much Things to Say"	3:08
3.	"Guiltiness"	3:19
4.	"The Heathen"	2:32
5.	"Exodus"	7:40

Side two
No.	Title	Length
6.	"Jamming"	3:31
7.	"Waiting in Vain"	4:16
8.	"Turn Your Lights Down Low"	3:39
9.	"Three Little Birds"	3:00
10.	"One Love/People Get Ready"	2:52

=== 2001 Deluxe edition ===
Disc one Exodus Remastered + Bonus tracks
No.	Title	Length
11.	"Roots" (B-side of "Waiting in Vain", released 19 August 1977)	3:42
12.	"Waiting in Vain (alternative version)" (previously unreleased)	4:43
13.	"Jamming (long version)" (12" single, released 11 November 1977)	5:52
14.	"Jamming" (previously unreleased)	3:04
15.	"Exodus" (B-side of "Exodus", released 24 June 1977)	3:08

Tracks 12 and 14 are previously unreleased.

Disc two Exodus tour (Live at the Rainbow Theatre, London, 4 June 1977)
No.	Title	Writer(s)	Length
1.	"The Heathen" (previously unreleased)		6:48
2.	"Crazy Baldhead / Running Away" (previously unreleased)	Rita Marley, Vincent Ford, Bob Marley	9:21
3.	"War / No More Trouble" (previously unreleased)	Allen Cole, Carlton Barrett, Bob Marley	7:44
4.	"Jamming" (previously unreleased)		7:07
5.	"Exodus" (previously unreleased)		11:46

Sessions with Lee Perry, July / August 1977
No.	Title	Writer(s)	Length
6.	"Punky Reggae Party"	Bob Marley, Lee Perry	9:18
7.	"Punky Reggae Party (dub)" (12" single, released November 1977)	Bob Marley, Lee Perry	8:47
8.	"Keep On Moving" (previously unreleased)	Curtis Mayfield	6:25
9.	"Keep On Moving (dub)" (previously unreleased; recorded July 1977, mixed August 1977)	Curtis Mayfield	7:15
10.	"Exodus / Waiting in Vain (advertisement)" (previously unreleased)		1:07

Tracks 1–5 and tracks 8, 9, and 10 are previously unreleased.

=== 2004 Definitive remastered edition ===
CD
No.	Title	Writer(s)	Length
1.	"Natural Mystic"		3:28
2.	"So Much Things to Say"		3:08
3.	"Guiltiness"		3:19
4.	"The Heathen"		2:32
5.	"Exodus"		7:40
6.	"Jamming"		3:31
7.	"Waiting in Vain"		4:16
8.	"Turn Your Lights Down Low"		3:39
9.	"Three Little Birds"		3:00
10.	"One Love/People Get Ready"	Bob Marley, Curtis Mayfield	2:52
11.	"Jamming" (long version)		5:52
12.	"Punky Reggae Party" (long version)		6:50

=== 2017 Exodus – 40th anniversary edition: Exodus – The Movement Continues ===
On 3 June 2017, The Marley Family, Island Records and UMe capitalised on the 40th anniversary of the Exodus album with a series of four reissues, three of which – titled Exodus – The Movement Continues – featuring the special release Exodus 40, son Ziggy Marley's newly curated "restatement" of the original album:

- a two-CD package including a CD of the original album and the bonus CD Exodus 40,
- a three-CD set including the above CDs and an extra CD Exodus Live (recorded at London's Rainbow Theatre the week of the original album's release) and
- a super deluxe vinyl limited edition including a gold vinyl version of the original LP plus vinyl LPs & singles.

==== CD editions ====
Disc one Exodus (1977 original release) (37:24)

Disc two

Exodus 40 – The Movement Continues, son Ziggy Marley's newly curated "restatement" of the original album
No.	Title	Writer(s)	Length
1.	"Exodus"		5:02
2.	"Natural Mystic"		3:23
3.	"The Heathen"		3:15
4.	"Guiltiness"		3:38
5.	"Jamming"		3:31
6.	"One Love/People Get Ready"	Bob Marley, Curtis Mayfield	2:59
7.	"Turn Your Lights Down Low"		4:05
8.	"Waiting in Vain"		4:38
9.	"Three Little Birds"		3:12
10.	"So Much Things to Say"		3:12

Disc three

Exodus Live (Live at the Rainbow Theatre, London, June 1, 3 & 4, 1977)
No.	Title	Length
1.	"Natural Mystic" (previously unreleased)	5:12
2.	"So Much Things to Say" (previously unreleased)	4:25
3.	"Guiltiness" (previously unreleased)	7:24
4.	"The Heathen"	6:43
5.	"Burnin and Lootin" (previously unreleased)	6:15
6.	"Positive Vibration" (previously unreleased)	5:32
7.	"Jamming" (previously unreleased)	6:24
8.	"Exodus" (previously unreleased)	11:36

==== Super Deluxe Vinyl limited edition box set ====
The Super Deluxe, four-LP, two-7" single vinyl version includes the original LP, Ziggy Marley's Exodus 40 restatement, the Exodus Live set (minus the track "Burnin And Lootin"), the Punky Reggae Party LP (which includes a previously unreleased extended mix of "Keep On Moving"), and a pair of vinyl 7" singles, including "Waiting in Vain" b/w "Roots" and "Smile Jamaica (Part One)" b/w "Smile Jamaica (Part Two)."

Vinyl LP 1 Exodus (1977 original release) (37:24)

Vinyl LP 2 Exodus 40 (36:55)

Vinyl LP 3 Exodus Live (Live at the Rainbow Theatre, London, June 1, 3 & 4, 1977) (Note: ... minus the (live) track "Burnin and Lootin" available only on CD.) (47:15)

Vinyl LP 4 – Punky Reggae Party (31:25)

- A1. Punky Reggae Party – 9:18
- A2. Punky Reggae Party Dub – 8:47
- B1. Keep On Moving – 13:20 (previously unreleased extended mix)

Vinyl single 1 – Waiting in Vain (8:31)

- A1. Waiting in Vain Alternate version – 4:49 (previously unreleased)
- B1. Roots – 3:42

Vinyl single 2 – Smile Jamaica (8:15)

- A1. Smile Jamaica Part One – 3:13
- B1. Smile Jamaica Part Two – 5:02

"2023 Analog Productions UHQR released February 2023" A limited edition, custom pressing. Limited to 3500 copies. Ultra high-quality record from analog productions. Pressed on Clarity vinyl. Direct from analog. Produced in Salina, Kansas by Chad Kassem.

== Musicians ==
Bob Marley and the Wailers

- Bob Marley: lead and backing vocals, guitars
- Junior Marvin: electric guitars
- Aston Barrett: basses
- Carlton Barrett: drums
- Tyrone Downie: synthesizer, electric piano, organ and backing vocals
- Alvin "Seeco" Patterson: percussions

Additional personnel

- Rita Marley, Marcia Griffiths, Judy Mowatt: backing vocals
- David Madden: trumpet, horn arrangements
- Vin Gordon: trombone
- Glen Da Costa: saxophone
- Neville Garrick: art direction

== Charts ==
=== Original release ===
Weekly chart performance for Exodus
Chart (1977–2024)	Peak position
Australian Albums (Kent Music Report)	88
Austrian Albums (Ö3 Austria)	21
Canada Top Albums/CDs (RPM)	46
France (IFOP)	20
German Albums (Offizielle Top 100)	58
Greek Albums (IFPI)	1
Dutch Albums (Album Top 100)	11
Norwegian Albums (VG-lista)	12
Swedish Albums (Sverigetopplistan)	14
Swiss Albums (Schweizer Hitparade)	40
UK Albums (Official Charts)	8
US Billboard 200	20
US Top R&B/Hip-Hop Albums (Billboard)	15

Year-end chart performance for Exodus
Chart (1977)	Position
UK Albums (OCC)	27

=== Deluxe edition ===
Chart performance for deluxe edition of Exodus
Chart (2001)	Peak position
French Albums (SNEP)	149
US Top Reggae Albums	4

== Certifications ==
Certifications for Exodus
Region	Certification	Certified units/sales
Canada (Music Canada)	Gold	50,000^{^}
France (SNEP)	Platinum	400,000^{*}
Germany (BVMI)	Gold	250,000^{^}
Italy (FIMI) Since 2009	Gold	25,000^{‡}
New Zealand (RMNZ)	3× Platinum	45,000^{‡}
United Kingdom (BPI)	2× Platinum	600,000^{‡}
United States (RIAA)	Gold	500,000^{^}
^{*} Sales figures based on certification alone.^{^} Shipments figures based on certification alone.^{‡} Sales+streaming figures based on certification alone.
