= Natty Dread =

Studio album by Bob Marley and the Wailers
- Released: 25 October 1974
- Recorded: 1974
- Studios: Harry J. Studios, Kingston, Jamaica
- Genres: Reggae; reggae rock
- Length: 38:59
- Label: Island/Tuff Gong
- Producers: Chris Blackwell and the Wailers

Bob Marley and the Wailers chronology
Rasta Revolution (1974)	Natty Dread (1974)	Live! (1975)

Natty Dread is the seventh album by Bob Marley and the Wailers, released in 1974. Previously Marley had recorded with Peter Tosh and Bunny Wailer as the Wailers, and this was his first record without them.

Natty Dread was most popularly received in the UK, where it peaked at No. 43 and sold in excess of 100,000 copies, making it a gold album. Over time it gained popularity in other parts of the world, and in 2003 it was ranked No. 181 on Rolling Stone magazine's list of the 500 greatest albums of all time.

== Content ==
Natty Dread is a spiritually charged political and social statement. It opens with a blues-influenced positive celebration of skanking, reggae and sex, "Lively Up Yourself". The original and still unreleased demo of the Island version of "Lively Up Yourself" was recorded in 1973.

"No Woman, No Cry", the second track, is probably the best known recording on the album. It is a nostalgic remembrance of growing up in the impoverished streets of Trenchtown, the ghetto of Kingston, Jamaica, and the happiness brought by the company of friends. The song has been performed by artists as diverse as Boney M. (sung by Liz Mitchell), The Fugees, Pearl Jam, Jimmy Buffett, Rancid and Gilberto Gil. Songwriting credit for "No Woman, No Cry" went to V. Ford. Vincent Ford, better known as "Tartar" to his friends and neighbors, had been a kind friend of Marley as a child in Trenchtown. Marley claimed he would have starved to death on several occasions as a child if not for the aid of Tartar. The original version of the song was in gospel style, featuring Peter Tosh and some unknown female backing vocals and was cut for Island in 1973.

"Them Belly Full (But We Hungry)" is a warning against allowing a nation's poor to go hungry, with the prophetic warning "a hungry mob is an angry mob", while "Talkin' Blues" and "Revolution" go deeper into controversial political commentary. "Rebel Music (3 O'Clock Roadblock)" is a reflection on the potential impact of reggae music on Jamaican society. The song was written after Marley had been stopped by a night-time police carcheck. The influence of Marley's increasing devotion to Rastafari can be heard in religious-themed songs like "So Jah Seh", "Natty Dread" and "Lively Up Yourself", while Marley's reputation as a romantic is confirmed with smooth, seductive songs like "Bend Down Low". The title track of the album takes its title from an idealised personification of the Rastafari movement, Natty Dread.

=== Songwriting credits ===
Although the album's liner notes list multiple songwriters, including family, friends and band members, all songs were written by Marley. Marley was involved in a contractual dispute with his former publishing company, Cayman Music.

Vincent Ford, a childhood friend from Jamaica, was given writing credit for "No Woman, No Cry", as well as the songs "Crazy Baldheads" (with Marley's wife Rita), "Positive Vibration" and "Roots Rock Reggae" from the 1976 album Rastaman Vibration, along with "Inna De Red" and "Jah Bless" with Marley's son, Stephen.

Marley had not wanted his new songs to be associated with Cayman and it had been speculated, including in his obituary in The Independent, that he had put them in the names of his close friends and family members as a means of avoiding the contractual restrictions and as a way to "provide lasting help to family and close friends".

Marley's former manager Danny Sims sued to obtain royalty and ownership rights to the songs, claiming that Marley had actually written the songs but had assigned the credit to Ford to avoid meeting commitments made in prior contracts. A 1987 court decision sided with the Marley estate, which assumed full control of the songs.

== Release ==
Natty Dread was released 25 October 1974 by Island and Tuff Gong.

In 1975, this album was mentioned in a few audio magazines as being ready to be released on Quadraphonic 8-track tape. This never happened. However, the Quadraphonic mixes of "Lively Up Yourself" and "No Woman No Cry" have been bootlegged from the master tapes and are available on the internet.

In 2001, a re-mastered edition of Natty Dread was released by Universal Records containing a bonus track.

== Reception and legacy ==
Professional ratings
Review scores
Source	Rating
AllMusic	5/5 stars
Christgau's Record Guide	A
Rolling Stone	4.5/5 stars
Select	3/5 medals

Released in the US in May 1975, the album reached the top half of the Billboard 200 at No. 92. When it was released in the UK in October 1974, it did even better, reaching No. 43.

In 2003, the album was ranked No. 181 on Rolling Stone magazine's list of the 500 Greatest Albums of All Time, maintaining the rating in a 2012 revised list. In 2025, the publication ranked "Them Belly Full (But We Hungry)" at number 12 on its list of "The 100 Best Protest Songs of All Time." The album was also included in the book 1001 Albums You Must Hear Before You Die.

== Track listing ==
=== Original album (1974) ===
Side one
No.	Title	Writer(s)	Length
1.	"Lively Up Yourself"	Bob Marley	5:11
2.	"No Woman, No Cry"	Vincent Ford	3:46
3.	"Them Belly Full (But We Hungry)"	Leon Cogill, Carlton Barrett	3:13
4.	"Rebel Music (3 O'Clock Roadblock)"	Aston Barrett, Hugh Peart	6:45

Side two
No.	Title	Writer(s)	Length
5.	"So Jah Seh"	Rita Marley, Willy Francisco	4:27
6.	"Natty Dread"	Rita Marley, Allen Cole	3:35
7.	"Bend Down Low"	Bob Marley	3:21
8.	"Talkin' Blues"	Leon Cogill, Carlton Barrett	4:06
9.	"Revolution"	Bob Marley	4:23

The Definitive Remastered edition (2001)
No.	Title	Writer(s)	Length
10.	"Am-A-Do" (bonus track)	Bob Marley	3:20

== Personnel ==
Bob Marley and the Wailers

- Bob Marley – lead vocals, rhythm guitar
- Aston Barrett – bass guitar
- Carlton Barrett – drums, percussion
- Bernard "Touter" Harvey – piano, organ
- Jean Roussel – Hammond organ, keyboards, arranger on "No Woman No Cry", "Natty Dread" and "Lively Up Yourself"
- Al Anderson – lead guitar

with:

- The I–Threes (Rita Marley, Judy Mowatt, Marcia Griffiths) – backing vocals
- Lee Jaffe – harmonica

Technical

- Sylvan Morris – engineer
- Phil Ault – engineer
- Sid Bucknor – mixer
- Chris Blackwell – producer
- The Wailers – producers
- Tony Wright – cover art
