= Waiting in Vain =

1977 single by Bob Marley & the Wailers

Single by Bob Marley & the Wailers

from the album Exodus
- B-side: "Roots"
- Released: 1977
- Genre: Reggae
- Length: 4:15
- Label: Tuff Gong, Island
- Songwriter: Bob Marley

Bob Marley & the Wailers singles chronology
"Exodus" (1977)	"Waiting in Vain" (1977)	"Jamming" / "Punky Reggae Party" (1977)

Audio video
- "Waiting in Vain" on YouTube

"Waiting in Vain" is a song written by reggae musician Bob Marley and recorded by Bob Marley and the Wailers, for their 1977 album Exodus. Released as a single, it reached number 27 on the UK Singles Chart.

The single was one of only a few of Marley's Island singles to feature a non-album B-side, this being the song "Roots", an outtake from the Rastaman Vibration sessions. This later appeared on the compilation Rebel Music and on Exodus (Deluxe Edition). The 1981 reissue of Waiting in Vain featured a megamix called Marley Mix Up Medley instead.

A rare 19-minute long acoustic version is available on YouTube.

== Musicians ==
- Bob Marley: lead and backing vocals, guitars
- Junior Marvin: electric guitars
- Aston Barrett: basses
- Carlton Barrett: drums
- Tyrone Downie: synthesizer, electric piano, organ and backing vocals
- Alvin "Seeco" Patterson: percussions

== Charts ==
Chart (1977–1984)	Peak position
UK Singles (OCC)	27 (1977)
UK Singles (OCC)	31 (1984)

== Certifications ==
Region	Certification	Certified units/sales
New Zealand (RMNZ)	3× Platinum	90,000^{‡}
United Kingdom (BPI)	Gold	400,000^{‡}
^{‡} Sales+streaming figures based on certification alone.

== Lee Ritenour version ==
In 1993, American Jazz guitarist Lee Ritenour recorded his version of the song featuring British reggae artist Maxi Priest. It was also included on his 21st album Wes Bound. The single peaked at number 54 in the US R&B chart.

=== Charts ===
Chart (1993)	Peak position
US R&B chart	54

== Annie Lennox version ==
"Waiting in Vain"

Single by Annie Lennox

from the album Medusa
- Released: 18 September 1995
- Studio: The Aquarium (London)
- Length: 5:41
- Label: Arista
- Songwriter: Bob Marley
- Producer: Stephen Lipson

Annie Lennox singles chronology
"A Whiter Shade of Pale" (1995)	"Waiting in Vain" (1995)	"Something So Right" (1995)

Music video
- "Waiting in Vain" on YouTube

"Waiting in Vain" was recorded by Scottish singer-songwriter Annie Lennox for her second studio album Medusa in 1995, 18 years after Marley recorded it. It was released as the album's third single in September 1995, by Arista Records, and reached number thirty-one on the UK Singles Chart.

=== Background and release ===
Lennox recorded the song at The Aquarium Studios in London. The song was noted for its production style, particularly in its ability to deliberately not "recreate the ultra-relaxed vibe" of Marley's version. Instead, Lennox's version was described as "smooth and lovely during the verses, with a simple electronic rhythm, keyboards and beautiful lines of acoustic guitar".

Produced by Stephen Lipson, "Waiting in Vain" was released as the third official single from Lennox's second solo studio album Medusa, which consisted entirely of cover versions. It followed the first two singles from Medusa – ""No More 'I Love You's'"" and "A Whiter Shade of Pale", both of which achieved commercial success. Whilst it reached the top forty in the United Kingdom, it failed to match the commercial success of the previous two singles.

=== In popular culture ===
Lennox's version was used in the 2001 film Serendipity, the 2002 film Changing Lanes and the 2003 film In the Cut. Additionally, the song was featured in the final episode of the Peter Kay BBC comedy series Car Share as a track on the fictional radio station, Forever FM.

=== Track listing ===
No.	Title	Length
1.	"Waiting in Vain" (Single Mix)	4:07
2.	"No More 'I Love You's'" (Junior Vasquez Mix)	7:32
3.	"Waiting in Vain" (Strong Body Mix)	5:27
4.	"Medusa" (Interview excerpts)	5:01

=== Charts ===
Chart (1995)	Peak position
Australia (ARIA)	117
Europe (European Hit Radio)	25
UK Singles (OCC)	31
