= Natural Mystic =

Song by Bob Marley and the Wailers

from the album Exodus
- Released: 3 June 1977
- Genre: Reggae
- Length: 3:28
- Songwriter: Bob Marley
- Producer: Bob Marley and the Wailers

"Natural Mystic" is a song by the Jamaican reggae band Bob Marley and the Wailers.

== Recording ==
The track starts with a slow fade in. According to Lee "Scratch" Perry: "We made the first track for 'Natural Mystic' on a drum machine. I added the machine pop drum, which give it that popping sound. Then he did it over again with Carly and it sounded good. On my version we had a horn section which sounded good to me."

== Reception ==
In a review of the song on AllMusic, Thomas Ward stated that it "has an almost hymnal quality to it" and that "everything about the song is ethereal and inspired" while going on to say that "Although the lyrics are vague, they’re no less effective than, say, Dylan's "Blowin' in the Wind" and “Natural Mystic” has become one of Bob Marley’s signature songs, and one of his greatest artistic achievements." Music critic Greil Marcus called it the best song on the Exodus album. In a review of "Natural Mystic" for NME Magazine, Gavin Martin states: "the mellow but matured, angry but assured international figurehead of ‘Natural Mystic’ (subtitle — ‘The Legend Lives On’) is a throwback to an early, more innocent era."

According to Bob Marley's band's bassist Aston "Family Man" Barrett: "That’s why it still stands up today, because it’s outstanding."

== Release ==
The track is included on the compilation albums Natural Mystic: The Legend Lives On and The Essential Bob Marley & the Wailers.

== Charts ==
Chart (2026)	Peak position
Jamaica Airplay (JAMMS)	2

== Certifications ==
Certifications for "Natural Mystic"
Region	Certification	Certified units/sales
New Zealand (RMNZ)	2× Platinum	60,000^{‡}
United Kingdom (BPI)	Silver	200,000^{‡}
^{‡} Sales+streaming figures based on certification alone.
