= Live! (Bob Marley and the Wailers album) =

Coordinates: 51°30′42″N 0°07′11″W

Live album by Bob Marley and the Wailers
- Released: 5 December 1975
- Recorded: 17–18 July 1975
- Venue: Lyceum Theatre, London
- Genre: Reggae
- Length: 45:15
- Languages: English; Jamaican Patois
- Label: Island
- Producers: Bob Marley and the Wailers, Steve Smith, Chris Blackwell

Bob Marley and the Wailers chronology
Natty Dread (1974)	Live! (1975)	Rastaman Vibration (1976)

Singles from Live!
- 1. "No Woman, No Cry (Live '75)" Released: 29 August 1975

Live! is a 1975 album by Bob Marley and the Wailers which was recorded live in concert during July 1975 at the Lyceum Theatre, London. "No Woman, No Cry (Live '75)" was released as a single. A two-disc deluxe edition was released in 2016 containing both the concerts that were used to compile the original album.

== Background ==
The band's concerts at the Lyceum Theatre, London, on 17 and 18 July 1975, were recorded by Island Records employee Danny Holloway, using the Rolling Stones Mobile Studio. The tracks selected were mostly from the 17 July performance, with "Lively Up Yourself" (not played on the 17th) from the 18th.

"I wasn't prepared for what I saw that night," recalled Sounds photographer Kate Simon (who shot the cover of Marley's 1978 album Kaya). "It was like seeing someone who was as good-looking as Steve McQueen, playing with a group that was peerless – as tight as anything you'd ever heard. And not only did you hear this magnificent voice, but the message was one of faith, truth and doing the right thing… To see someone who sang about principles, and did it in such a way that made even me dance, that was quite something."

At the concert on the 17th, Chris Blackwell noted the audience's reaction to "No Woman, No Cry".

Production was credited to Bob Marley and the Wailers, Steve Smith and Chris Blackwell.

== Release ==
The album was released on 5 December 1975 by Island Records as a vinyl LP. The first CD version came out in 1987 with a complete extended version of "Lively Up Yourself" (at 7:43) by mistake. In 2001 Live! was remastered/re-released on CD with a bonus track: "Kinky Reggae" from the show. In 2017 a two-disc release called Live! Deluxe Edition, became available in vinyl and CD formats, with full recordings of both the 17 July and 18 July performances (a total of 22 tracks).

== Reception ==
Professional ratings
Review scores
Source	Rating
AllMusic	link
Christgau's Record Guide	A−
Rolling Stone	link

Reviewing Live! in Christgau's Record Guide: Rock Albums of the Seventies, Robert Christgau wrote, "The rushed tempos take their toll in aura: 'Trenchtown Rock' can be far more precise, painful, and ecstatic; like most live albums this relies on obvious material. But the material is also choice, unlike most live albums it's graced by distinct sound and economical arrangements, and the tempos force both singer and the band into moments of wild, unexpected intensity. I used to think Natty Dread's 'No Woman, No Cry' was definitive."

== Track listing ==
=== Original Edition ===
Side one
No.	Title	Writer(s)	Original release	Length
1.	"Trenchtown Rock"	Bob Marley	A-side of 1971 single	4:23
2.	"Burnin' and Lootin'"	Bob Marley	Burnin'	5:11
3.	"Them Belly Full (But We Hungry)"	Leon Cogill, Carlton Barrett	Natty Dread	4:36
4.	"Lively Up Yourself"	Bob Marley	Natty Dread	4:33

Side two
No.	Title	Writer(s)	Original release	Length
5.	"No Woman, No Cry"	Vincent Ford	Natty Dread	7:07
6.	"I Shot the Sheriff"	Bob Marley	Burnin	5:18
7.	"Get Up, Stand Up"	Bob Marley, Peter Tosh	Burnin	6:28

The Definitive Remastered edition (2001)
No.	Title	Writer(s)	Original release	Length
8.	"Kinky Reggae" (bonus track)	Bob Marley	Catch a Fire	7:35

=== Deluxe Edition ===
Disc 1
No.	Title	Length
1.	"Trenchtown Rock"	5:10
2.	"Burnin' and Lootin"	5:09
3.	"Them Belly Full (But We Hungry)"	4:35
4.	"Rebel Music (3 O'Clock Roadblock)"	5:25
5.	"Stir It Up"	5:44
6.	"No Woman, No Cry"	7:37
7.	"Natty Dread"	5:27
8.	"Kinky Reggae"	7:55
9.	"I Shot The Sheriff"	5:15
10.	"Get Up Stand Up"	10:18

Disc 2
No.	Title	Length
1.	"Trenchtown Rock"	4:23
2.	"Slave Driver"	4:02
3.	"Burnin' and Lootin"	4:56
4.	"Them Belly Full (But We Hungry)"	3:53
5.	"Rebel Music (3 O'Clock Roadblock)"	5:16
6.	"No Woman, No Cry"	7:06
7.	"Kinky Reggae"	6:42
8.	"Natty Dread"	4:33
9.	"Stir It Up"	4:43
10.	"Lively Up Yourself"	7:49
11.	"I Shot The Sheriff"	7:08
12.	"Get Up Stand Up"	10:17

== Musicians ==
Bob Marley and the Wailers

- Bob Marley – lead vocals, rhythm guitar
- Carlton Barrett – drums
- Aston "Family Man" Barrett – bass
- Tyrone Downie – keyboards
- Al Anderson – lead guitar
- Alvin "Seeco" Patterson – percussion

with:

- the "I Threes": (Rita Marley, Judy Mowatt, Marcia Griffiths) – backing vocals (Note: Marcia Griffiths missed this tour because of pregnancy.)

== Personnel ==
- Recorded at the Lyceum, London, 17 & 18 July 1975
- Live sound mixing: Dave Harper
- Live Monitor Engineer: CHIP CHASE (Eric Chipchase)
- Live recording by Rolling Stones Mobile
- Recording engineer: Steve Smith
- Mixed at: Basing Street Studios
- Mixing engineer: Phill Brown
- Many thanks to Don Taylor and Dave Harper for making everything happen.
- Bob Marley and the Wailers - produced the music
- Steve Smith & Chris Blackwell - produced the record
- Reissue supervised by Bill Levenson and Maxine Stowe with special thanks to the Marley Family and Chris Blackwell.
- Mastered from the original two track analog master tapes by Ted Jensen at Sterling Sound, New York, 2001.
- Tape research by Jane Hitchin, David Lascelles, and Zoe Roberts at Universal Tape Library, London.
- LIVE! (Island ILPS 9376) was originally released 5 December 1975.

== Certifications ==
Region	Certification	Certified units/sales
Austria (IFPI Austria)	Gold	25,000^{*}
France (SNEP)	Gold	100,000^{*}
Germany (BVMI)	Gold	250,000^{^}
Netherlands (NVPI)	Platinum	100,000^{^}
Switzerland (IFPI Switzerland)	Gold	25,000^{^}
United Kingdom (BPI)	Silver	60,000^{^}
United States (RIAA)	Gold	500,000^{^}
^{*} Sales figures based on certification alone.^{^} Shipments figures based on certification alone.
