= One Love/People Get Ready =

1965 song by The Wailers

"One Love"

Song by the Wailers

from the album The Wailing Wailers
- Released: 1965
- Recorded: 1965
- Studio: Jamaica (Brentford Road, Kingston)
- Genre: Ska, rocksteady
- Length: 3:20
- Label: Studio One
- Songwriters: Bob Marley; Curtis Mayfield (uncredited)
- Producer: Clement Dodd

"One Love / People Get Ready"

Single by Bob Marley and the Wailers

from the album Exodus
- B-side: "So Much Trouble in the World"
- Released: 16 April 1984
- Recorded: 1977
- Genre: Roots reggae
- Length: 2:54
- Label: Island
- Songwriters: Bob Marley; Curtis Mayfield
- Producers: Bob Marley and the Wailers

Bob Marley and the Wailers singles chronology
"Buffalo Soldier" (1983)	"One Love / People Get Ready" (1984)	"Iron Lion Zion" (1992)

Official Music Video
- "One Love/People Get Ready" on YouTube

"One Love" is a ska song written by Bob Marley and recorded by his group the Wailers from their 1965 debut studio album The Wailing Wailers. It was rerecorded as part of the 1970 medley "All in One", which contained reggae reworkings of their early ska songs. This was released as a single and is also included on the compilation African Herbsman under the name "All in One".

The famous version of "One Love" that appears on their album Exodus was recorded in 1977 for Island Records under the title of "One Love/People Get Ready". This version credits Curtis Mayfield (as Island Records wanted to avoid copyright problems), and it gives co-authorship credits to both Marley and Mayfield as it contains an interpolation of the Impressions' song "People Get Ready", written by Mayfield. As the main artist, Marley and his group were credited as Bob Marley and the Wailers. It was not released as a single until 16 April 1984, to promote the forthcoming greatest hits album Legend. However, the single became one of his biggest hits and has been included on many of Marley and the Wailers subsequent compilation albums. The original recording of the song does not credit Mayfield's song and is simply titled "One Love"; this is because copyright law was not enforced for Jamaican recordings at this time. The original song was published in the key of B♭ major, but it has since been transposed in the key of C major.

In 2007, the 1965 recording of "One Love" was inducted into the Grammy Hall of Fame.

== Music videos ==
The first music video was a posthumous release directed by Don Letts in 1984 to accompany the Bob Marley and the Wailers compilation album, Legend. It stars a young British-Jamaican boy, Jesse Lawrence, in his home on the World's End Estate, and on the King's Road dancing at the head of a large crowd of punks, locals and tourists as well as archival footage of Marley (from the "Is This Love" music video). It also features several cameo appearances including Paul McCartney, two members of Bananarama, Neville Staple of the Specials, members of the reggae groups Aswad and Musical Youth, Suggs and Chas Smash of Madness; some of the short clips in this video are also in Madness' video for their song "The Return of the Los Palmas 7". The song was also released alongside the video and gave Marley a posthumous UK hit when it reached number 5 in May 1984.

A second music video for "One Love" was produced by Marley's estate in 2014, with fans submitting video ideas through Tongal and then ultimately compiling a video of diverse contributors lip-syncing and dancing to the song.

== Charts ==
=== Weekly charts ===
Chart (1984)	Peak position
Australia (Kent Music Report)	24
Belgium (Ultratop 50 Flanders)	4
Europe (European Hot 100 Singles)	18
Ireland (IRMA)	6
Netherlands (Dutch Top 40)	2
Netherlands (Single Top 100)	3
New Zealand (Recorded Music NZ)	1
UK Singles (OCC)	5

=== Year-end charts ===
Chart (1984)	Position
Belgium (Ultratop 50 Flanders)	41
Netherlands (Dutch Top 40)	14
Netherlands (Single Top 100)	18
New Zealand (Recorded Music NZ)	3
UK Singles (OCC)	61

== Certifications ==
Region	Certification	Certified units/sales
Brazil (Pro-Música Brasil)	Gold	30,000^{‡}
Italy (FIMI)	Gold	25,000^{‡}
New Zealand (RMNZ)	3× Platinum	90,000^{‡}
Spain (Promusicae)	Gold	30,000^{‡}
United Kingdom (BPI)	Platinum	600,000^{‡}
^{‡} Sales+streaming figures based on certification alone.

== "One Love" (2020 version with Patoranking) ==
=== Charts ===
2026 weekly chart performance
Chart (2026)	Peak position
Jamaica Airplay (JAMMS)	2
