= Get Up, Stand Up =

1973 single by The Wailers

Single by The Wailers

from the album Burnin'
- B-side: "Slave Driver"
- Released: 14 September 1973
- Studio: Harry J. Studios, Kingston, Jamaica
- Genre: Reggae
- Length: 3:11 (single version); 3:42 (album version)
- Label: Tuff Gong; Island
- Songwriters: Bob Marley; Peter Tosh
- Producers: Chris Blackwell; The Wailers

The Wailers singles chronology
| "Concrete Jungle" (1973) | "Get Up, Stand Up" (1973) | "Trouble Dub" (1973) |

Music video
- "Get Up, Stand Up" on YouTube

"Get Up, Stand Up" is a song written by Bob Marley and Peter Tosh. It originally appeared on The Wailers' 1973 album Burnin'. It was recorded and played live in numerous versions by Bob Marley and the Wailers, along with solo versions by Tosh and Bunny Wailer. It was later included on the compilations Legend and Rebel Music, as well as live recordings such as Live at the Roxy among others. In 1973, "Get Up, Stand Up" peaked at number 33 on the Dutch Top 40. In 1986, it peaked at number 49 in New Zealand.

"Get Up, Stand Up" is considered one of Marley's greatest songs. In 2020, Rolling Stone ranked it number one on their list of the 50 greatest Bob Marley songs, while The Guardian ranked it number two on their list of Marley's 30 greatest songs.

In 1999, the 1973 recording of "Get Up, Stand Up" by Bob Marley & The Wailers on Island Records was inducted into the Grammy Hall of Fame.

== Premise and usage in concerts ==
Marley wrote the song while touring Haiti, deeply moved by its poverty and the lives of Haitians, according to his then-girlfriend Esther Anderson. The tune of the chorus may derive from the instrumental hook in "Slippin' into Darkness" by War, which was released the previous year—War being a band for whom Marley had expressed admiration. The song was frequently performed at Marley's concerts, often as the last song. "Get Up, Stand Up" was also the last song Marley ever performed on stage, on 23 September 1980 at the Stanley Theater, now the Benedum Center in Pittsburgh, Pennsylvania.

On his DVD Live at the Hollywood Bowl, artist Ben Harper relates a childhood experience in which, during a 1978 Bob Marley concert at the Starlight Amphitheater, Peter Tosh showed up unannounced as this song was being performed, took the microphone from Marley and started singing the last verse of the song to thunderous applause. Tosh was on tour opening for the Rolling Stones at the time.

== Recordings by the Wailers ==
The song was re-recorded and re-released by the three major Wailers on their own solo releases, each with varying arrangements and approaches to the third verse, which claims that "Almighty God is a living man". Bob Marley and the Wailers released a Bob Marley only version on Live! in 1975, this version was notable for the "WO-YO!" refrain after the third verse. Tosh would include his own solo version on his second album, Equal Rights in 1977. Bunny Wailer was the last to release his own version on Protest. This version actually featured Tosh due to his involvement in recording the album before his death.

== Certifications ==
| Region | Certification | Certified units/sales |
|---|---|---|
| New Zealand (RMNZ) | Gold | 15,000^{‡} |
| United Kingdom (BPI) | Silver | 200,000^{‡} |
^{‡} Sales+streaming figures based on certification alone.

== Covers and remixes ==
In 1976, the song was covered by Martha Veléz for her album Escape from Babylon, which was produced by Bob Marley. In 1988, the song was performed live at an Amnesty International Concert for Human Rights by Bruce Springsteen, Sting, Peter Gabriel, Tracy Chapman and Youssou N'Dour. The 2014 album Songs from a Stolen Spring features a version of the song performed by Glenn Tilbrook of Squeeze fame. The version is meshed with "Beyond These Doors" by Egyptian singer Dina El Wedidi. The Ukrainian band Bloom Twins recorded a version in 2014, in support of the Euromaidan protesters occupying Independence Square in Kyiv.
