= Exodus (Bob Marley and the Wailers song) =

1977 single by Bob Marley and the Wailers

Single by Bob Marley and the Wailers

from the album Exodus
- B-side: "Exodus" (instrumental version)
- Released: 1977
- Genre: Reggae fusion
- Length: 7:40
- Label: Tuff Gong; Island
- Songwriter: Bob Marley

Bob Marley and the Wailers singles chronology
"Who the Cap Fit" (1976)	"Exodus" (1977)	"Waiting in Vain" (1977)

"Exodus" is a song written by reggae musician Bob Marley and recorded by Bob Marley and the Wailers, for the Exodus (1977) album. Released as a single, it reached number 14 on the UK Singles Chart. "Exodus" was Marley's first single to receive widespread airplay on black radio stations in the US, expanding the artist's predominantly white college age and Caribbean expats fanbase in the country.

== Overview ==
The song ties together the Biblical story of Moses leading the Israelites out of Egypt to the hope of Rastafarians to be led to freedom. After an assassination attempt in Jamaica in 1976, Marley fled to London where he recorded the song and album of the same name. He had conceived "Exodus" as the album title before even writing the song. The song has a revolutionary theme punctuated by its chorus of "Exodus, movement of Jah people."

UDiscoverMusic wrote that the song was "a rippling, surging, seven-minute call to arms for a nation of displaced souls on the march to a new spiritual homeland. 'We know where we're going/We know where we're from/We're leaving Babylon,' Marley sang against a cyclical riff that was turned, like clay on a potter's wheel, to perfection." In a retrospective review of the album, Patricia Maschino of Billboard wrote that the title track was a "scorching mash-up of funk, reggae and disco, punctuated by blasts of regal horns."

According to the sheet music published by Sony/ATV Music Publishing, the song is composed in the key of A minor with Marley's vocal range spanning from G_{4} to A_{5}.

== Charts ==
Chart performance for "Exodus"
Chart (1977)	Peak position
UK Singles (OCC)	14
US Bubbling Under Hot 100 Singles (Billboard) (Note: The first iteration of the Bubbling Under chart that was discontinued in 1985. Billboard's website does not list any archives of the first iteration in regards to the current iteration.)	3
US R&B (Billboard)	19

== Certifications ==
Region	Certification	Certified units/sales
New Zealand (RMNZ)	Gold	15,000^{‡}
United Kingdom (BPI)	Silver	250,000^{‡}
^{‡} Sales+streaming figures based on certification alone.
