= Rastaman Vibration =

Studio album by Bob Marley and the Wailers
- Released: 30 April 1976
- Recorded: late 1975–early 1976
- Studios: Harry J. Studios, Joe Gibbs Studio, Kingston, Jamaica; Mixed at Criteria Studios, Miami, Florida
- Genres: Reggae, roots reggae
- Length: 35:21
- Labels: Island; Tuff Gong (reissue)
- Producers: Bob Marley and the Wailers

Bob Marley and the Wailers chronology
Live! (1975)	Rastaman Vibration (1976)	Exodus (1977)

Singles from Rastaman Vibration
- 1. "Rat Race" Released: 1975; 2. "Johnny Was" Released: 7 May 1976; 3. "Roots, Rock, Reggae" Released: 25 June 1976; 4. "Positive Vibration" Released: 1976; 5. "Who the Cap Fit" Released: 1976

Retrospective professional reviews
Review scores
Source	Rating
AllMusic	4/5 stars
Christgau's Record Guide	B+
Rolling Stone	4/5 stars

Rastaman Vibration is the eighth studio album by Jamaican reggae band Bob Marley and the Wailers, released in April 1976.

== Critical reception ==
Reviewing for Rolling Stone in 1976, Robert Palmer said that on the album Marley consummately performs "a dual role as spokesman for the Third World's disadvantaged and avatar of a highly commercial brand of popular music". While lacking the forceful, intricate quality of the Wailers' past line-up, "the sensitive, careful listener will learn from Rastaman Vibration something of the pain, rage and determination of Shantytown, Jamaica, and perhaps something of the community's political and cultural fragmentation as well", Palmer concluded.

Village Voice critic Robert Christgau said if the record's first side "makes it seem that reggae has turned into the rasta word for boogie—even to a Trenchtown tragedy recited with all the toughness of an imprecation against litter—the unimpassioned sweetness of most of side two sounds like a function of reflective distance, assured in its hard-won calm. Some of it's even better."

== Commercial performance ==
Rastaman Vibration was a great success in the US, becoming the first Bob Marley release to reach the top 10 on the Billboard 200 chart (peaking at number eight), in addition to releasing Marley's most popular US single "Roots, Rock, Reggae", the only Marley single to reach the Billboard Hot 100 chart, peaking at number 51. Synthesizers are featured prominently on Rastaman Vibration, adding a breezy embellishment to otherwise hard-driving songs with strong elements of rock guitar. This is one of the three Wailers solo albums released in 1976, along with Blackheart Man by Bunny Wailer and Legalize It by Peter Tosh.

== Songwriting credits ==
Although the album's liner notes list multiple songwriters, including family friends and band members, all songs were written by Marley. Marley was involved in a contractual dispute at the time with his former publishing company, Cayman Music. Marley had not wanted his new songs to be associated with Cayman and it was speculated, including in his obituary in The Independent, that he had put them in the names of his friends and family members as a means of avoiding the contractual restrictions and to provide lasting help to family and close friends.

War audio sample

Vincent Ford, a childhood friend from Jamaica, is credited as the songwriter for "No Woman, No Cry" on the 1974 album Natty Dread, as well as the songs "Crazy Baldhead" (with Marley's wife Rita), "Positive Vibration" and "Roots Rock Reggae" from Rastaman Vibration, along with "Inna De Red" and "Jah Bless" with Marley's son, Stephen.

Marley's widow and his former manager Danny Sims sued to obtain royalty and ownership rights to the songs, claiming that Marley had actually written the songs but had assigned the credit to Ford to avoid meeting commitments made in prior contracts. A 1987 court decision favored the Marley estate, which assumed full control of the songs.

== Track listing ==
Side one
No.	Title	Writer(s)	Length
1.	"Positive Vibration"	Vincent Ford	3:34
2.	"Roots, Rock, Reggae"	Vincent Ford	3:38
3.	"Johnny Was"	Rita Marley	3:48
4.	"Cry to Me"	Rita Marley	2:36
5.	"Want More"	Aston Barrett	4:14

Side two
No.	Title	Writer(s)	Length
1.	"Crazy Baldhead"	Rita Marley, Vincent Ford	3:12
2.	"Who the Cap Fit"	Aston Barrett, Carlton Barrett	4:43
3.	"Night Shift"	Bob Marley	3:10
4.	"War"	Allen Cole, Carlton Barrett	3:36
5.	"Rat Race"	Rita Marley	2:50

The Definitive Remastered edition (2001) Single disc
No.	Title	Writer(s)	Length
1.	"Positive Vibration"	Vincent Ford	3:34
2.	"Roots, Rock, Reggae"	Vincent Ford	3:38
3.	"Johnny Was"	Rita Marley	3:48
4.	"Cry to Me"	Rita Marley	2:36
5.	"Want More"	Aston Barrett	4:14
6.	"Crazy Baldhead"	Rita Marley, Vincent Ford	3:12
7.	"Who the Cap Fit"	Aston Barrett, Carlton Barrett	4:43
8.	"Night Shift"	Bob Marley	3:10
9.	"War"	Allen Cole, Carlton Barrett	3:36
10.	"Rat Race"	Rita Marley	2:50
11.	"Jah Live"	Bob Marley, Lee Perry	4:16

Deluxe edition (2002): Disc one: Rastaman Vibration remastered
No.	Title	Writer(s)	Length
1.	"Positive Vibration"	Vincent Ford	3:34
2.	"Roots, Rock, Reggae"	Vincent Ford	3:38
3.	"Johnny Was"	Rita Marley	3:48
4.	"Cry to Me"	Rita Marley	2:36
5.	"Want More"	Aston Barrett	4:14
6.	"Crazy Baldhead"	Rita Marley, Vincent Ford	3:12
7.	"Who the Cap Fit"	Aston Barrett, Carlton Barrett	4:43
8.	"Night Shift"	Bob Marley	3:10
9.	"War"	Allen Cole, Carlton Barrett	3:36
10.	"Rat Race"	Rita Marley	2:50
11.	"Jah Live" (original mix)	Bob Marley, Lee Perry	4:16
12.	"Concrete" (b-side of "Jah Live")	Bob Marley, Lee Perry	4:24
13.	"Roots, Rock, Reggae" (unreleased single mix)	Vincent Ford	3:38
14.	"Roots, Rock, Dub" (unreleased single dub mix)	Vincent Ford	3:38
15.	"Want More" (unreleased alternate album mix)	Aston Barrett	5:10
16.	"Crazy Baldhead" (unreleased alternate album mix)	Rita Marley, Vincent Ford	3:08
17.	"War" (unreleased alternate album mix)	Allen Cole, Carlton Barrett	4:03
18.	"Johnny Was" (unreleased alternate album mix)	Rita Marley	3:41

Disc two: Rastaman Vibration tour Live at The Roxy, Hollywood, California, 26 May 1976
No.	Title	Writer(s)	Length
1.	"Introduction"	Bob Marley	0:38
2.	"Trenchtown Rock"	Bob Marley	4:55
3.	"Burnin' and Lootin'"	Bob Marley	4:53
4.	"Them Belly Full (but We Hungry)"	Leon Cogill, Carlton Barrett	4:12
5.	"Rebel Music (3 o'Clock Road Block)"	Aston Barrett, Hugh Peart	5:54
6.	"I Shot the Sheriff"	Bob Marley	6:27
7.	"Want More"	Aston Barrett	6:55
8.	"No Woman, No Cry"	Vincent Ford	5:18
9.	"Lively Up Yourself"	Bob Marley	5:44
10.	"Roots, Rock, Reggae"	Vincent Ford	5:32
11.	"Rat Race"	Rita Marley	7:46
12.	"Smile Jamaica" (part one, a-side)	Bob Marley, Lee Perry	3:18
13.	"Smile Jamaica" (part two, b-side)	Bob Marley, Lee Perry	3:07

== Personnel ==
Bob Marley and the Wailers

- Bob Marley – vocals
- Earl "Chinna" Smith – guitar, percussion
- Al Anderson – guitar
- Carlton Barrett – drums
- Aston Barrett – bass guitar
- Jean Alain Roussel – Hammond Organ on "Positive Vibrations", "No Woman, No Cry" and "Roots, Rock, Reggae"
- Tyrone Downie – keyboards

with:

- I Threes – backing vocals
- Tommy McCook – saxophone on "Roots, Rock, Reggae"
- Donald Kinsey – guitar overdubs on "Johnny Was" and "Roots, Rock, Reggae"
- Neville Garrick – art direction

Source: The Jamaica Observer

== Charts ==
Chart (1976)	Peak position
Australian Albums (Kent Music Report)	68
Canada Top Albums/CDs (RPM)	32
France (IFOP)	12
Dutch Albums (Album Top 100)	20
New Zealand Albums (RMNZ)	26
Norwegian Albums (VG-lista)	14
Swedish Albums (Sverigetopplistan)	45
UK Albums (Official Charts)	15
US Billboard 200	8
US R&B Albums	11

== Certifications ==
Region	Certification	Certified units/sales
United Kingdom (BPI)	Gold	100,000^{^}
United States (RIAA)	Gold	500,000^{^}
^{^} Shipments figures based on certification alone.
