= Jamming (song) =

1977 song by Bob Marley & The Wailers

Single by Bob Marley and The Wailers

from the album Exodus
- B-side: "Punky Reggae Party"
- Released: June 3, 1977
- Recorded: 1976–1977
- Genre: Reggae
- Length: 3:31
- Label: Tuff Gong/Island
- Songwriter: Bob Marley

Bob Marley and The Wailers singles chronology
"Waiting in Vain" (1977)	"Jamming" / "Punky Reggae Party" (1977)	"Is This Love" (1978)

Music video
- "Jamming" on YouTube

"Jammin'"

Single by Bob Marley featuring MC Lyte

from the album Chant Down Babylon
- Released: March 2000
- Recorded: 1999
- Studio: Marley Music Studios; Kingston, Jamaica
- Genre: R&B; reggae fusion
- Length: 4:08
- Label: Tuff Gong; Island
- Songwriters: Robert Marley; Lana Moorer
- Producer: Stephen Marley

Bob Marley singles chronology
"Rainbow Country" (2000)	"Jammin'" (2000)	"I Know a Place" (2001)

MC Lyte singles chronology
"Party Going On" (1998)	"Jammin" (2000)	"Time For A Change" (2000)

"Jamming" is a song by the reggae band Bob Marley and the Wailers from their 1977 album Exodus. The song also appears on the compilation album Legend. The song was re-released 10 years later as a tribute to Bob Marley and was again a hit, including in the Netherlands, where it was in the charts for 3 weeks. In Jamaican patois, the word jamming refers to a getting together or celebration, and the song urges Rastafarians to unite.

The song includes the lines, "No bullet could stop us now" and "Your life is worth much more than gold". On December 3, 1976, Marley and others including his wife Rita Marley and manager Don Taylor, were shot by unknown gunmen who had broken into his home, he subsequently recovered. He wrote the song whilst staying in Nassau, after the assassination attempt. It was recorded at Island Records studio in London, in early 1977. The song also contains references to romantic relationships, via lyrics such as "True love I know exists, is the love I can't resist, so jam by my side".

Jamming was performed live at the Rainbow Theatre by Bob Marley and The Wailers at the end of the bands tour for Exodus, in June 1977. Another performance of Jamming occurred at the One Love Peace Concert, that was held in Jamaica on April 22, 1978. During the performance he invited politicians from rival parties, Michael Manley and Edward Seaga, on stage and joined their hands together in a show of unity, after considerable political unrest had impacted the country. The United Nations gave him the Peace Medal of the Third World, in recognition of this. The band also played it live at the Boston Music Hall in June 1978.

In the 1970s Stevie Wonder played and performed with Bob Marley and subsequently wrote and released Master Blaster (Jammin'), as a tribute to him, with lyrics inspired by Jamming. After Bob Marley died he performed the song in honour of him. He later admitted that he had wanted Bob Marley to feature on the track. Rita Marley performed the song at tribute concert Marley Magic: Live In Central Park At Summerstage, and it has also been performed by Marley's children, including Ziggy Marley and the Melody Makers on Live Vol. 1. The song is featured in Bob Marley: One Love. Jamming has also been covered by many different musicians, including Monty Alexander.

== Charts ==
=== Weekly charts ===
==== Original version ====
Chart (1977–78)	Peak position
Australia (Kent Music Report)	99
UK Singles (Official Charts)	9
Chart (1987)	Peak position
Belgium (Ultratop 50 Flanders)	38
Netherlands (Single Top 100)	85

==== with MC Lyte ====
Chart (2000)	Peak position
Netherlands (Single Top 100)	54
Spain (Promusicae)	10
Sweden (Sverigetopplistan)	59
UK Hip Hop/R&B (Official Charts)	9
UK Dance (Official Charts)	12
UK Singles (Official Charts)	42

==== Fisher version ====
Weekly chart performance for "Jamming" (Fisher version)
Chart (2025)	Peak position
Honduras Anglo Airplay (Monitor Latino)	7

== Certifications ==
Region	Certification	Certified units/sales
New Zealand (RMNZ)	3× Platinum	90,000^{‡}
New Zealand (RMNZ) Fisher rework	Gold	15,000^{‡}
Portugal (AFP)	Gold	20,000^{‡}
United Kingdom (BPI)	2× Platinum	1,200,000^{‡}
^{‡} Sales+streaming figures based on certification alone.

== In popular culture ==
- The song is played in the movie Captain Ron, along with many other Bob Marley songs.
- The song was adapted for a Vodafone commercial called "Roaming" instead of "Jamming", promoting the operator's roaming service.
- The song was spoofed as "Diggin'" on an episode of Bill Nye the Science Guy.
- The song is played live in a nightclub in the Miami Vice episode titled "Cool Runnin'" (1984).
- The song is sometimes used by ABC during coverage of NBA games.
- The song made an appearance in a Super Bowl commercial featuring the Budweiser Frogs.
- The song has been featured in The Simpsons.
