= Carlton Barrett =

Jamaican musician (1950–1987)

- Also known as: Carly; Field Marshal
- Born: 17 December 1950; Kingston, Jamaica
- Died: 17 April 1987 (aged 36) Kingston, Jamaica
- Genres: Reggae; ska; rocksteady
- Occupations: Songwriter; musician
- Instruments: Drums; percussion; vocals
- Years active: Late 1960s – 1987
- Formerly of: Bob Marley & the Wailers; The Wailers Band; The Upsetters; I Threes

Carlton Barrett (17 December 1950 – 17 April 1987) was a Jamaican musician best known for being the long-time drummer for Bob Marley & the Wailers. Recognized for his innovative style, which featured a highly syncopated, broken triplet pattern on the hi-hat, and for his dazzling drum introductions, Barrett's prolific recordings with Bob Marley have been internationally celebrated. He is credited with popularising the one drop rhythm.

Carlton Barrett was born in Kingston, Jamaica, in 1950, the second son of Wilfred and Violet Barrett. As a teenager, he built his first set of drums out of empty paint cans he found on the street. Along with his contemporaries, drummers Sly Dunbar, Leroy "Horsemouth" Wallace, Style Scott and Carlton "Santa" Davis, Barrett was heavily influenced by Lloyd Knibb of the Skatalites.

In the 1960s, Barrett began performing with his brother Aston "Family Man" Barrett, under the names The Soul Mates, The Rhythm Force and eventually The Hippy Boys, a line-up that featured Max Romeo on vocals, Leroy Brown, Delano Stewart, Glen Adams and Alva Lewis. In 1969, the brothers joined the Wailers (later Known as Bob Marley and the Wailers). During his years with Marley, Barrett continued to record for many of Jamaica's best known artists and is featured on solo albums by Bunny Wailer (Blackheart Man), Augustus Pablo (King Tubbys Meets Rockers Uptown) and Peter Tosh (Legalize It and Equal Rights) as well as many others.

== Death ==
On 17 April 1987, a gunman shot and killed Barrett outside his home at 12 Bridgemount Park Avenue in Kingston, Jamaica. He was 36.

Carlton Barrett's widow, Albertine Barrett, was subsequently jailed on 18 October 1991, after being convicted of conspiracy to commit murder. Sentenced with her were the taxi driver Glenroy Carter, 39, her reputed lover, and Junior "Bang" Neil, 39, a mason, who the prosecution alleged was responsible for the actual shooting.
