= Outline of Bob Marley =

Overview of and topical guide to Bob Marley

The following outline is provided as an overview of and topical guide to Bob Marley:

Bob Marley – Jamaican reggae singer, songwriter, musician, and guitarist (1945–1981). Starting in 1963 with the group The Wailers, he forged a distinctive songwriting and vocal style that would later resonate with audiences worldwide.

== Career of Bob Marley ==
=== Bands with Bob Marley ===
- I Threes

==== Bob Marley and the Wailers ====
Bob Marley and the Wailers

===== Band members =====
- Bob Marley – guitar, lead vocals (1963–1981; died 1981)
- Peter Tosh – guitar, keyboard, vocals (1963–1974; died 1987)
- Bunny Wailer – percussion, vocals (1963–1974; died 2021)
- Junior Braithwaite – vocals (1963–1964; died 1999)
- Cherry Smith – backing vocals (1963–1966; died 2008)
- Beverley Kelso – backing vocals (1963–1965)
- Constantine Walker – backing vocals (1966–1967)
- Aston Barrett – bass (1970–1981)
- Carlton Barrett – drums, percussion (1970–1981; died 1987)
- Earl Lindo – keyboards (1973, 1978–1981)
- Tyrone Downie – keyboards, percussion, backing vocals (1974–1981)
- Rita Marley – backing vocals (1974–1981)
- Marcia Griffiths – backing vocals (1974–1981)
- Judy Mowatt – backing vocals (1974–1981)
- Al Anderson – guitar (1974–1975, 1978–1981)
- Alvin Patterson – percussion (1975–1981)
- Earl "Chinna" Smith – guitar (1975–1976)
- Donald Kinsey – guitar (1975–1976)
- Junior Marvin – guitar, backing vocals (1977–1981)

=== Discography of Bob Marley ===
- Bob Marley and the Wailers discography

==== Studio albums of Bob Marley ====
- The Wailing Wailers
- Soul Rebels
- Soul Revolution Part II
- The Best of The Wailers
- Catch a Fire
- Burnin'
- Rasta Revolution
- Natty Dread
- Rastaman Vibration
- Exodus
- Kaya
- Survival
- Uprising
- Confrontation

==== Live albums of Bob Marley ====
- Live!
- Babylon by Bus
- Talkin' Blues
- Live at the Roxy

==== Compilation albums with Bob Marley ====
- African Herbsman
- Chances Are
- Interviews
- Legend
- Songs of Freedom
- Natural Mystic: The Legend Lives On
- One Love: The Very Best of Bob Marley and the Wailers
- Gold
- Africa Unite: The Singles Collection

==== Songs by Bob Marley ====
- "Could You Be Loved"
- "Get Up, Stand Up"
- "I Shot the Sheriff"
- "Iron Lion Zion"
- "Is This Love"
- "Jah Live"
- "Jamming"
- "Judge Not"
- "Natural Mystic"
- "No Woman, No Cry"
- "One Love/People Get Ready"
- "Punky Reggae Party"
- "Redemption Song"
- "Simmer Down"
- "Slogans"
- "Stiff Necked Fools"
- "Stir It Up"
- "Sun Is Shining"
- "Three Little Birds"
- "Turn Your Lights Down Low"
- "Waiting in Vain"
- "War"
- "Zimbabwe"

=== Concerts featuring Bob Marley ===
- Smile Jamaica Concert

==== Tours featuring Bob Marley ====
- Catch a Fire Tour
- Burnin' Tour
- Rastaman Vibration Tour
- Exodus Tour
- Kaya Tour
- Babylon by Bus Tour
- Survival Tour
- Uprising Tour
- Cedella Booker

=== Other ventures of Bob Marley ===
- Tuff Gong

== Legacy of Bob Marley ==
- Bob Marley Museum
- Tribute to the Legend: Bob Marley
- Family of Bob Marley

=== Awards and honors ===
- 1976: Rolling Stone Band of the Year
- June 1978: Awarded the Peace Medal of the Third World from the United Nations.
- February 1981: Awarded Jamaica's third highest honor, the Jamaican Order of Merit.
- March 1994: Inducted into the Rock and Roll Hall of Fame.
- 1999: Album of the Century for Exodus by Time Magazine.
- February 2001: A star on the Hollywood Walk of Fame.
- February 2001: Awarded Grammy Lifetime Achievement Award.
- 2004: Rolling Stone ranked him No. 11 on their list of the 100 Greatest Artists of All Time.
- 2004: Among the first inductees into the UK Music Hall of Fame
- "One Love" named song of the millennium by BBC.
- Voted as one of the greatest lyricists of all time by a BBC poll.
- 2006: An English Heritage blue plaque was unveiled at his first UK residence in Ridgmount Gardens, London, dedicated to him by Nubian Jak community trust and supported by Her Majesty's Foreign Office.
- 2010: Catch a Fire inducted into the Grammy Hall of Fame (Reggae Album).

== Personal life of Bob Marley ==
=== Religious affiliations of Bob Marley ===
- Rastafari
- Christianity
  - Eastern Christianity
    - Oriental Orthodoxy
      - Ethiopian Orthodox Church

=== Family of Bob Marley ===
- Rita Marley – Cuban-born Jamaican-Ghanaian singer and the widow of Bob Marley. She was a member of the vocal group the I Threes, along with Marcia Griffiths and Judy Mowatt, who gained recognition as the backing vocalists for Bob Marley and the Wailers.

==== Children of Bob Marley ====
1. Sharon Marley (born 23 November 1964) – biological daughter of Rita Marley and was adopted by Bob Marley when the two married. She was in the group Ziggy Marley and the Melody Makers along with her young sister and brothers. With the group, she has won three Grammy awards.
2. Cedella Marley (born 23 August 1967) – Jamaican singer, dancer, fashion designer, actress, and entrepreneur. She is the first-born daughter of Bob Marley and Rita Marley.
3. Ziggy Marley (born 17 October 1968) – son of Bob Marley and Rita Marley.
4. Stephen Marley (born 20 April 1972) – American/Jamaican reggae musician. Stephen is a six-time Grammy award winner as an artist, producer, and member of Ziggy Marley & The Melody Makers. He is the son of Bob Marley and Rita Marley.
5. Robert "Robbie" (born 16 May 1972) – born to Pat Williams.
6. Rohan Marley (born 19 May 1972) – son of Bob Marley and Janet Hunt. He was born during his father's marriage to Rita and went to live with her from the age of four then lived with Marley's mother after his father died of cancer in Miami in 1981.
7. Karen (born 1973) – born to Janet Bowen
8. Stephanie (born 17 August 1974) – according to Cedella Booker she was the daughter of Rita and a man called Ital with whom Rita had an affair; nonetheless she was acknowledged as Bob's daughter
9. Julian Marley (born 4 June 1975) – British Jamaican reggae musician, and son of Bob Marley and Lucy Pounder. He follows in his father's footsteps and is a devout Rastafarian who uses his music to inspire his life and spirituality.
10. Ky-Mani Marley (born 26 February 1976) – Jamaican reggae and hip-hop artist. His name is of East African origin, and means "Adventurous Traveler". He is the only child of Bob Marley with Anita Belnavis, a Jamaican table tennis champion.
11. Damian Marley (born 21 July 1978) – youngest son of Bob Marley; his mother is Cindy Breakspeare, Miss World 1976. Damian was 2 years old when his father died.

== See also ==
- Outline of Jamaica
- Outline of music
- The Original Wailers
- The Upsetters
- Upsetter Records
