= Rebel Music (Bob Marley and the Wailers album) =

Compilation album by Bob Marley & the Wailers
- Released: 1986
- Genre: Roots reggae
- Length: 50:24
- Labels: Tuff Gong, Island
- Producers: Chris Blackwell (executive), The Wailers, Alex Sadkin, Chris Blackwell, Jack Nubar, Bob Marley & The Wailers, Bob Marley, Steve Smith

Bob Marley & the Wailers chronology
Bob, Peter, Bunny & Rita (1985)	Rebel Music (1986)	Talkin' Blues (1991)

Professional ratings
Review scores
Source	Rating
AllMusic	link
Select	3/5 medals

Rebel Music is a compilation album by Bob Marley & The Wailers released by Island Records in 1986. It consists of tracks drawn from such albums as Catch A Fire, Natty Dread, Live!, Rastaman Vibration, Babylon By Bus, and Survival, as well as an exclusive remix of "Rebel Music (3 O'Clock Roadblock)" and the first album appearance of 1977 B Side "Roots". The album includes the hit singles "So Much Trouble in the World", "War / No More Trouble", and "Get Up, Stand Up". Some of the vinyl pressings include a looping sound at the end groove of side A, apparently the noise at the ending of Bob Marley & The Wailers's "Satisfy My Soul", released 1978 on the album Kaya by Tuff Gong/Island. The remastered edition of the CD features "Wake Up And Live (Parts 1&2)" as a bonus track. Both parts had previously appeared on either side of a rare single in 1979, here they are mixed together to form one track.

== Track listing ==
=== Original album (1986) ===
Side one
No.	Title	Writer(s)	Original release	Length
1.	"Rebel Music (3 O'Clock Roadblock)" (Remixed by Paul "Groucho" Smykle)	Aston Barrett, Hugh Peart	Natty Dread (1974)	6:41
2.	"So Much Trouble in the World"	Bob Marley	Survival (1979)	4:00
3.	"Them Belly Full (But We Hungry)"	Leon Coghill, Carlton Barrett	Natty Dread (1974)	3:11
4.	"Rat Race"	Marley	Rastaman Vibration (1976)	2:51
5.	"War / No More Trouble" (Live)	Allen Cole, C. Barrett, Marley	Babylon by Bus (1978)	5:43

Side two
No.	Title	Writer(s)	Original release	Length
6.	"Roots"	Marley	"Waiting in Vain" (1977 B-side)	3:44
7.	"Slave Driver"	Marley	Catch a Fire (1973)	2:54
8.	"Ride Natty Ride"	Marley	Survival (1979)	3:51
9.	"Crazy Baldhead"	Rita Marley, Vincent Ford	Rastaman Vibration (1976)	3:10
10.	"Get Up, Stand Up" (Live)	Marley, Peter Tosh	Live! (1975)	6:34

=== The Definitive Remasters edition (2002) ===
Bonus tracks
No.	Title	Writer(s)	Original release	Length
11.	"Wake Up and Live" (pts.1&2)	Marley, Anthony Davis	12" mix of track on Survival (1979)	6:40

== Charts ==
Chart performance for Rebel Music
Chart (1984)	Peak position
Australian Albums (Kent Music Report)	78

== Certifications ==
Region	Certification	Certified units/sales
New Zealand (RMNZ)	Gold	7,500^{^}
^{^} Shipments figures based on certification alone.
