= World's Gone Wrong =

Studio album by Lucinda Williams
- Released: January 23, 2026
- Studios: Room & Board (Nashville); Electric Lady (New York)
- Length: 47:35
- Labels: Highway 20; Thirty Tigers
- Producers: Ray Kennedy; Tom Overby

Lucinda Williams chronology
Stories from a Rock n Roll Heart (2023)	World's Gone Wrong (2026)

World's Gone Wrong is the sixteenth studio album by the American singer-songwriter Lucinda Williams. It was released on January 23, 2026, under Williams' own label Highway 20 Records with distribution by Thirty Tigers.

== Background ==
World's Gone Wrong features nine original songs composed by Williams and a cover of Bob Marley and the Wailers' "So Much Trouble in the World", heard here as a duet with Mavis Staples. The album also features additional guest appearances from Brittney Spencer ("The World's Gone Wrong" and "Something's Gotta Give") and Norah Jones ("We've Come Too Far to Turn Around").

The album was produced by Tom Overby and Ray Kennedy and recorded at the Room & Board Studio in Nashville, Tennessee.

== Promotion ==
The album's lead single, "The World's Gone Wrong", was released on October 30, 2025, simultaneously with the album's announcement. A performance video coincided with the song's release. The second single, "So Much Trouble in the World", was released on December 12, 2025.

== Reception ==
Professional ratings
Aggregate scores
Source	Rating
Metacritic	82/100
Review scores
Source	Rating

On review aggregator Metacritic, World's Gone Wrong received a score of 82 out of 100 based on four reviews, indicating "univeral acclaim".

In an article published by the Oxford American, writer Jim Beaugez commented, "World’s Gone Wrong articulates the anger, hope, and inspiration she’s carried since the protests of her youth, with songs that explore the struggles of race, poverty, and trauma that continue to shadow America today." The article also references parallels with the 2017 Jesmyn Ward novel Sing, Unburied, Sing, which inspired the song "Sing Unburied Sing": "In the same way Ward uses song as a medium for the marginalized, Williams recognizes the act of singing as protest and affirmation." John Amen of Beats Per Minute wrote, "Williams examines the 'dark age' we’re currently traversing but refuses to surrender to despair". He concluded, "World’s Gone Wrong extends Williams’ fertile run, infused with the aesthetic adventurousness and undiluted honesty that have characterized her work for over four decades".

=== Accolades ===
A list of nominations for World's Gone Wrong
Year	Association	Category	Nominated work	Result	Ref.
2027	Grammy Awards	Best Americana Album	World's Gone Wrong	Pending	

== Track listing ==
World's Gone Wrong track listing
No.	Title	Writer(s)	Length
1.	"The World's Gone Wrong" (featuring Brittney Spencer)	Lucinda Williams; Tom Overby; Doug Pettibone	5:07
2.	"Something's Gotta Give" (featuring Brittney Spencer)	Williams; Overby; Pettibone	5:38
3.	"Low Life"	Williams; James Krivchenia; Adrianne Lenker; Alexander Meek; Travis Stephens	4:24
4.	"How Much Did You Get for Your Soul?"	Williams; Overby; Pettibone	4:00
5.	"So Much Trouble in the World" (featuring Mavis Staples)	Bob Marley	4:35
6.	"Sing Unburied Sing"	Williams; Overby; Pettibone	3:31
7.	"Black Tears"	Williams; Overby; Pettibone	5:39
8.	"Punchline"	Williams; Marc Ford; Overby; Pettibone	5:38
9.	"Freedom Speaks"	Williams; Overby; Pettibone	4:04
10.	"We've Come Too Far to Turn Around"	Williams	4:59
Total length:			47:35

== Personnel ==
Credits adapted from the album's liner notes.

- Lucinda Williams – vocals
- Ray Kennedy – production, mixing (all tracks), recording (tracks 1, 2, 4–10)
- Tom Overby – production
- John Rooney – recording (3)
- Pete Lyman – mastering
- Brady Blade – drums (all tracks), tambourine (3), djembe (5)
- David Sutton – electric bass (1–4, 6–10), backing vocals (3), upright bass (5)
- Doug Pettibone – electric guitar (1–7, 9, 10), backing vocals (3, 6, 7), resonator guitar (8), piano (9)
- Marc Ford – electric guitar (1, 2, 4, 6–9), acoustic guitar (3, 5), backing vocals (3), slide guitar (5, 10)
- Rob Burger – Hammond B3 (1–4, 6, 8, 9), Wurlitzer (4), Vox Jaguar (5)
- Brittney Spencer – backing vocals (1, 2)
- Mickey Raphael – harmonica (3)
- Maureen Murphy – backing vocals (4, 6, 7, 9)
- Mavis Staples – vocals (5)
- Siobhan M. Kennedy – backing vocals (6, 7)
- Norah Jones – vocals, piano (10)
- Mark Seliger – photography
- Fetzer Design – design

== Charts ==
Chart performance for World's Gone Wrong
Chart (2026)	Peak position
Australian Albums (ARIA)	94
Austrian Albums (Ö3 Austria)	30
Belgian Albums (Ultratop Flanders)	46
Croatian International Albums (HDU)	12
Dutch Albums (Album Top 100)	77
French Rock & Metal Albums (SNEP)	53
German Albums (Offizielle Top 100)	37
German Rock & Metal Albums (Offizielle Top 100)	11
Norwegian Physical Albums (IFPI Norge)	5
Swedish Physical Albums (Sverigetopplistan)	7
Scottish Albums (Official Charts)	8
Swiss Albums (Schweizer Hitparade)	44
UK Albums Sales (OCC)	8
UK Americana Albums (Official Charts)	2
UK Independent Albums (Official Charts)	5
US Top Album Sales (Billboard)	14
