= Marley (surname) =

- Pronunciation: /ˈmɑːrli/

Origin
- Languages: English; Irish

Marley is an English-language surname with numerous etymological origins. In many cases, the surname is derived from any of several like-named placenames in England, such as those in Devon, Kent, Lancashire (Mearley), Sussex (Marley Farm) and West Yorkshire. The placenames in Devon, Kent, and West Yorkshire are, in part, derived from the Old English element leah, meaning "woodland clearing". Early forms of the surname are de Merlai, in about 1145–1165; de Mardele, in 1208; de Marley, in 1285; and de Marleye, in 1306. In the 17th century, the surname was taken to Ireland by a family from Northumbria. However, in some cases the surname in Ireland may be an Anglicised form of the Irish-language Ó Mearthaile (another suggestion is Ó Mearlaigh; it is unlikely to be an Anglicised form of Ó Murghaile). Notable people with the surname include:

- Bob Marley, Jamaican reggae musician
  Notable members of Bob Marley's family include:
  - Rita Marley, singer and wife of Bob Marley
  - Cedella Marley Booker, singer and writer, and mother of Bob Marley
  - Cedella Marley, musician and clothing designer, daughter of Bob Marley
    - Skip Marley, reggae musician, son of Cedella Marley
  - Damian Marley, reggae musician
  - Julian Marley, reggae musician
  - Ky-Mani Marley, reggae musician
  - Ziggy Marley, reggae musician
  - Stephen Marley, reggae musician
  - Rohan Marley, former pro football player
  - Norval Marley, father of Bob Marley
- Bob Marley, American comedian
- Bert Marley, American politician from Idaho
- Elsie Marley, 18th-century English alewife with a song about her
- Jack Marley, Irish boxer
- John Marley, American actor
- John Marley, English mining engineer
- Mickey Marley, a Northern Irish street entertainer
- Peverell Marley (1899–1964), American cinematographer
- Stephen Marley, British author and game designer

Fictional characters:

- Jacob Marley, fictional character in A Christmas Carol
- Elaine Marley, fictional character in Monkey Island (series)
