= Bob, Peter, Bunny & Rita =

Compilation album by Bob Marley and the Wailers
- Released: 1985
- Genre: Reggae
- Length: 31:43
- Label: Jamaica Records
- Producers: Johnny Nash, Arthur Jenkins, Joe Venneri

Bob Marley and the Wailers chronology
Legend (1984)	Bob, Peter, Bunny & Rita (1985)	Rebel Music (1986)

Bob, Peter, Bunny & Rita is a roots reggae album by Bob Marley & the Wailers, released posthumously in 1985, four years after Marley's death. All tracks were previously unreleased recordings by Jad Records Co., Inc.

== Track listing ==
All tracks written by Bob Marley, except where noted.

Side one

1. "Oh Lord" (Johnny Nash, Bob Marley) – 2:39
2. "It Hurts to Be Alone" (Bob Marley, Bunny Livingston, Peter Tosh) – 2:45
3. "Lonesome Feelings" – 4:51
4. "Milk Shake and Potato Chips" (Jimmy Norman, Al Pyfrom) – 3:04
5. "Touch Me" – 4:26

Side two

6. "Lonely Girl" (Jimmy Norman, Al Pyfrom, Dorothy Hughes) – 4:35
7. "The World Is Changing" (Jimmy Norman, Al Pyfrom) – 3:58
8. "Treat You Right" (Jimmy Norman, Al Pyfrom) – 2:18
9. "Soul Shake Down Party" – 3:07

== Personnel ==
- Bob Marley – lead vocal, backing vocals
- Peter Tosh – lead vocal, backing vocals
- Bunny "Wailer" Livingston – lead vocal, backup vocals
- Rita Marley – lead vocal, backing vocals
- Sammy Merindino – drums
- Gregg Mangifico – keyboard & synthesizer
- Elliot Randall – guitar
- Eric Gale – guitar
- Neil Jason – bass
- Clevie Johnson – bass
- Sergio Castillo – percussion
- Jamaica Military Band and Hugh Masekela – horns

Technical

- Mixed by Reggie Thompson for The Thompson Group
- Mixing Engineer: Hugo Dwyer
- Asst. Mixing Engineer: Matthew Kasha
- Mixed at Quadrasonic Sound Systems
- Mixed at Park South Studios by Joe Venneri, Brighton Entertainment Company
- Recording Engineers: Joe Venneri, Richard Alderson, Bill Garnett
- Asst. Recording Engineers: Craig Johnson, Jamie Chaleff
