= Talkin' Blues =

Live album by Bob Marley & the Wailers
- Released: 4 February 1991
- Recorded: 1973–1975
- Genre: Reggae
- Length: 61:46
- Label: Tuff Gong

Bob Marley & the Wailers chronology
Rebel Music (1986)	Talkin' Blues (1991)	Songs of Freedom (1992)

Professional ratings
Review scores
Source	Rating
AllMusic	3/5 stars
Rolling Stone	4/5 stars

Talkin' Blues is a live album by Bob Marley & The Wailers, released in 1991. It contains live studio recordings from 1973 and 1975 intercut with interview segments of Bob Marley. The majority of tracks are taken from the recordings Bob Marley & The Wailers did on 31 October 1973, at The Record Plant in Sausalito, California, for San Francisco radio station KSAN. They include "You Can't Blame the Youth", sung by Peter Tosh, and "Get Up, Stand Up" with Bob Marley and Peter Tosh alternatingly taking lead vocals. The remaining tracks are taken from recordings made before the release of 1974's Natty Dread album, a performance at The Lyceum Theatre in London and interview segments from Jamaican radio in 1975.

== Track listing ==
=== Original album (1991) ===
Side one
No.	Title	Writer(s)	Length
1.	"Talkin'"		0:17
2.	"Talkin' Blues" (alternative version)	Leon Corgill, Carlton Barrett	4:38
3.	"Talkin'"		0:21
4.	"Burnin' and Lootin'" (live at the Record Plant, San Francisco, 1973)	Bob Marley	6:36
5.	"Talkin'"		0:49
6.	"Kinky Reggae" (live at the Record Plant, San Francisco, 1973)	Marley	5:08
7.	"Get Up Stand Up" (live at the Record Plant, San Francisco, 1973)	Marley, Peter Tosh	4:44
8.	"Talkin'"		0:57
9.	"Slave Driver" (live at the Record Plant, San Francisco, 1973)	Marley	3:47
10.	"Talkin'"		1:31
11.	"Walk the Land Proud" (live at the Record Plant, San Francisco, 1973)	Bunny Livingstone	3:30
12.	"Talkin'"		0:51

Side two
No.	Title	Writer(s)	Length
13.	"You Can't Blame the Youth" (live at the Record Plant, San Francisco, 1973)	Tosh	4:06
14.	"Talkin'"		0:36
15.	"Rastaman Chant" (live at the Record Plant, San Francisco, 1973)	Traditional	6:23
16.	"Talkin'"		1:44
17.	"Am-A-Do" (previously unreleased)	Marley	3:07
18.	"Talkin'"		1:00
19.	"Bend Down Low" (alternative version)	Marley	2:41
20.	"Talkin'"		1:52
21.	"I Shot the Sheriff" (live at The Lyceum, London, 1975)	Marley	7:12

Original CD Version
No.	Title	Writer(s)	Length
1.	"Talkin'"		0:17
2.	"Talkin' Blues" (alternative version)	Leon Corgill, Carlton Barrett	4:38
3.	"Talkin'"		0:21
4.	"Burnin' and Lootin'" (live at the Record Plant, San Francisco, 1973)	Bob Marley	6:36
5.	"Talkin'"		0:49
6.	"Kinky Reggae" (live at the Record Plant, San Francisco, 1973)	Marley	5:08
7.	"Get Up Stand Up" (live at the Record Plant, San Francisco, 1973)	Marley, Peter Tosh	4:44
8.	"Talkin'"		0:57
9.	"Slave Driver" (live at the Record Plant, San Francisco, 1973)	Marley	3:47
10.	"Talkin'"		1:31
11.	"Walk the Land Proud" (live at the Record Plant, San Francisco, 1973)	Bunny Livingstone	3:30
12.	"Talkin'"		0:51
13.	"You Can't Blame the Youth" (live at the Record Plant, San Francisco, 1973)	Tosh	4:06
14.	"Talkin'"		0:36
15.	"Rastaman Chant" (live at the Record Plant, San Francisco, 1973)	Traditional	6:23
16.	"Talkin'"		1:44
17.	"Am-A-Do" (previously unreleased)	Marley	3:07
18.	"Talkin'"		1:00
19.	"Bend Down Low" (alternative version)	Marley	2:41
20.	"Talkin'"		1:52
21.	"I Shot the Sheriff" (live at The Lyceum, London, 1975)	Marley	7:12

=== The Definitive Remasters edition (2002) ===
No.	Title	Writer(s)	Length
1.	"Talkin'"		0:17
2.	"Talkin' Blues" (alternative version)	Leon Corgill, Carlton Barrett	4:38
3.	"Talkin'"		0:21
4.	"Burnin' and Lootin'" (live at the Record Plant, San Francisco, 1973)	Bob Marley	6:36
5.	"Talkin'"		0:48
6.	"Kinky Reggae" (live at the Record Plant, San Francisco, 1973)	Marley	5:08
7.	"Get Up, Stand Up" (live at the Record Plant, San Francisco, 1973)	Marley, Peter Tosh	4:44
8.	"Talkin'"		0:57
9.	"Slave Driver" (live at the Record Plant, San Francisco, 1973)	Marley	3:47
10.	"Talkin'"		1:31
11.	"Walk the Land Proud" (live at the Record Plant, San Francisco, 1973)	Bunny Livingstone	3:30
12.	"Lively Up Yourself" (bonus track, live at the Record Plant, San Francisco, 1973)	Marley	7:41
13.	"Talkin'"		0:51
14.	"You Can't Blame the Youth" (live at the Record Plant, San Francisco, 1973)	Tosh	4:06
15.	"Stop that Train" (bonus track, live at the Record Plant, San Francisco, 1973)	Tosh	4:03
16.	"Talkin'"		0:36
17.	"Rastaman Chant" (live at the Record Plant, San Francisco, 1973)	Traditional	6:23
18.	"Talkin'"		1:44
19.	"Am-A-Do" (previously unreleased)	Marley	3:07
20.	"Talkin'"		1:00
21.	"Bend Down Low" (alternative version)	Marley	2:41
22.	"Talkin'"		1:52
23.	"I Shot the Sheriff" (live at The Lyceum, London, 1975)	Marley	7:12
24.	"Bend Down Low" (bonus track, live at the Record Plant, San Francisco, 1973)	Marley	4:20

== Personnel ==
=== 1973 recordings ===
- Bob Marley - vocals, guitar
- Peter Tosh - vocals, guitar
- Aston "Familyman" Barrett - bass
- Carlton "Carly" Barrett - drums, percussion
- Earl "Wire" Lindo - keyboards
- Joe Higgs - vocals, percussion

=== 1974 recordings ===
- Bob Marley - vocals, guitar
- Aston "Familyman" Barrett - bass
- Carlton "Carly" Barrett - drums, percussion
- Bernard "Touter" Harvey - piano, organ
- Al Anderson - lead guitar
- The I-Threes: Rita Marley, Marcia Griffiths, Judy Mowatt - background vocals

=== 1975 recording ===
personnel as 1974 except Carlton Barrett on drums only, without Harvey, and with the addition of

- Tyrone Downie - keyboards
- Alvin "Seeco" Patterson - percussion

=== Additional personnel ===
- Dermot Hussey - interviewer
