= How Much Did You Get for Your Soul? =

How Much Did You Get for Your Soul? may refer to:

- "How Much Did You Get for Your Soul?", a song by the Pretenders for Get Close, 1986
- "How Much Did You Get for Your Soul?", a song by Lucinda Williams for World's Gone Wrong, 2026
