= Phyllis Dillon =

Jamaican singer

Phyllis Dillon CD
- Born: 27 December 1944; Linstead, St. Catherine, Jamaica
- Died: 15 April 2004 (aged 59) Long Island, United States
- Genres: Rocksteady, reggae
- Occupation: Singer
- Years active: Early 1960s – 1971, early 1990s – early 2000s
- Labels: Treasure Isle

Phyllis Dillon CD (27 December 1944 – 15 April 2004) was a Jamaican rocksteady and reggae singer who recorded for Duke Reid's lucrative Treasure Isle record label in the late 1960s and early 1970s.

== Life and career ==
Dillon was born in 1944 in Linstead, St. Catherine, Jamaica, and attended the Linstead Primary School. Influenced by American singers Connie Francis, Patti Page and Dionne Warwick, she began singing in talent contests. It was during a performance at the Glass Bucket Club in Kingston, Jamaica with the group The Vulcans, that Duke Reid's session guitarist Lynn Taitt discovered Dillon.

Dillon was introduced to Treasure Isle studios by Tommy McCook, and recorded her first record for Duke Reid, "Don’t Stay Away", in late 1966, a recording that has been described as "perhaps the finest female performance in Jamaican music". While most of Dillon's subsequent recordings would be covers of popular and obscure American songs including Bettye Swann's "Make Me Yours", Perry Como's "Tulips and Heather," The Grass Roots' "Midnight Confessions," and Stephen Stills's "Love the One You're With"; "Don't Stay Away" was an original composition featuring Tommy McCook and the Supersonics as the backing band.

Another original song, "It’s Rocking Time" would later be turned into the Alton Ellis' hit "Rocksteady". While these early recordings demonstrate Dillon's mastery of the rocksteady sound, a much slower, soulful, response to the sultry weather that made ska's upbeat rhythm and tempo undesirable, even impracticable, it was no indication of her performance, 1967's "Perfidia". Popularized by the American surf rock band The Ventures, "Perfidia" is a 1940 song written by Alberto Domínguez and made popular by the Cuban bandleader, Xavier Cugat. Dillon also recorded duets with Ellis (as 'Alton and Phyllis'), including "Why Did You Leave Me To Cry" and "Remember that Sunday". Dillon is regarded as one of the key singers of the rocksteady era.

At the end of 1967, Dillon moved to New York. The following five years were spent living a double life. She had a family and career in banking in the United States, flying frequently back to Kingston, Jamaica to continue recording for Reid.

After a number of singles and an album entitled Living in Love, Dillon ended her recording career in 1971.

In 1991, Michael Bonnet, the entertainment director for the Oceanea Hotel in Kingston approached Dillon inviting her to sing. Her refusal at first was later rescinded and sparked a revitalized interest in performing and recording. In the years following, Dillion would tour the UK, Germany and Japan.

In 1998 Dillon returned to the recording studio with Lynn Taitt, marked by reinterest in ska music in the United States. She remained active until illness took hold.

Dillon died on 15 April 2004 in Long Island, New York, after a two-year battle with cancer, at the age of 59. She was posthumously awarded the Order of Distinction in 2009 by the Jamaican government.

== Discography ==
=== Albums ===
- One Life to Live (1972), Treasure Isle

Compilations

- Love Is All I Had (1994), Rhino
- One Life to Live (2000), Rhino
- Midnight Confessions: Classic Rocksteady And Reggae (2000), Westside
- Love Is All I Had (A Tribute To The Queen Of Jamaican Soul) (2004), Trojan

=== Singles ===
- "Don't Stay Away" (1967), Treasure Isle
- "This Is a Lovely Way" (1967), Treasure Isle
- "Perfidia" (1967), Treasure Isle
- "Things Of The Past" (1967), Treasure Isle
- "I Wear This Ring"/"Don't Touch Me Tomato" (1968), Treasure Isle
- "Love Is All I Had" (1969), Trojan
- "Walk Through This World" (1970), Duke - B-side of Tommy McCook and the Supersonics' "The Rooster"
- "This Is Me" (1970), Duke Reid
- "Midnight Confession" (1971), Treasure Isle
- "One Life To Live One Love To Give" (1971), Treasure Isle
- "In the Ghetto" (1972), Sioux
- "Wide A-Wake In A Dream" (1985), Element Promotion
- "Right Track" (2003), Trojan - with Hopeton Lewis
- "Why Did You Leave Me To Cry" (2004), Treasure Isle - with Alton Ellis, B-side of Ellis's "If I Could Rule This World"
- "Close To You", Treasure Isle - B-side of Alton Ellis's "Rock Steady"
- "Get on the Right Track", Treasure Isle
- "The Hands of Love", Sure Shot
- "Remember That Sunday", Treasure Isle - with Alton Ellis
- "Woman of the Ghetto", Treasure Isle
- "Right Track", High Note - 12-inch discomix
- "Tomato", High Note - 12-inch
- "Rock Steady", Treasure Isle
- "Humpty Dumpty", Cool Soul
- "The Love A Woman Should Give To A Man", Duke Reid Greatest Hits
