= Nine Mile, Jamaica =

Nine Mile Nine Miles
- Village
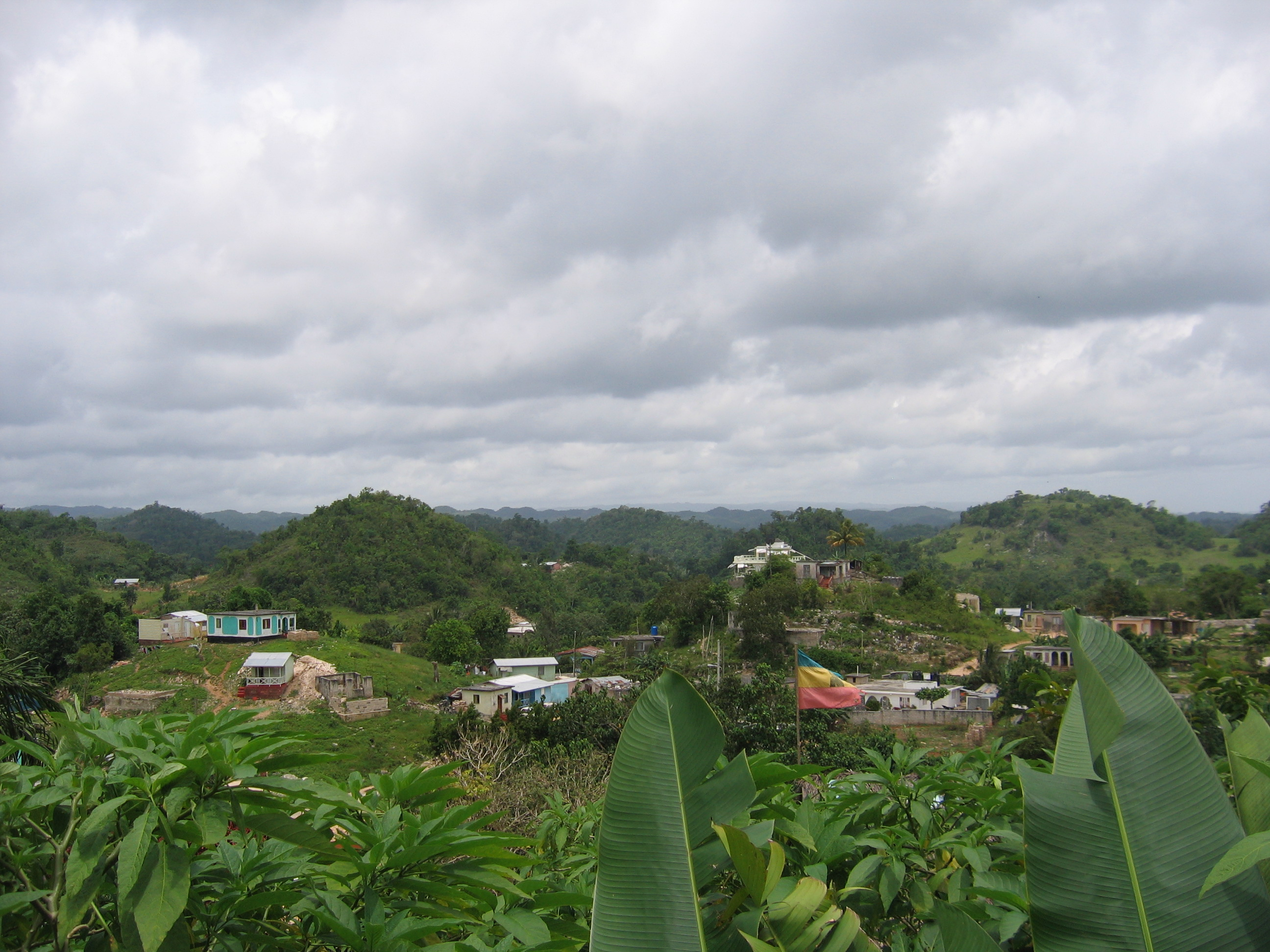
- View of Nine Mile

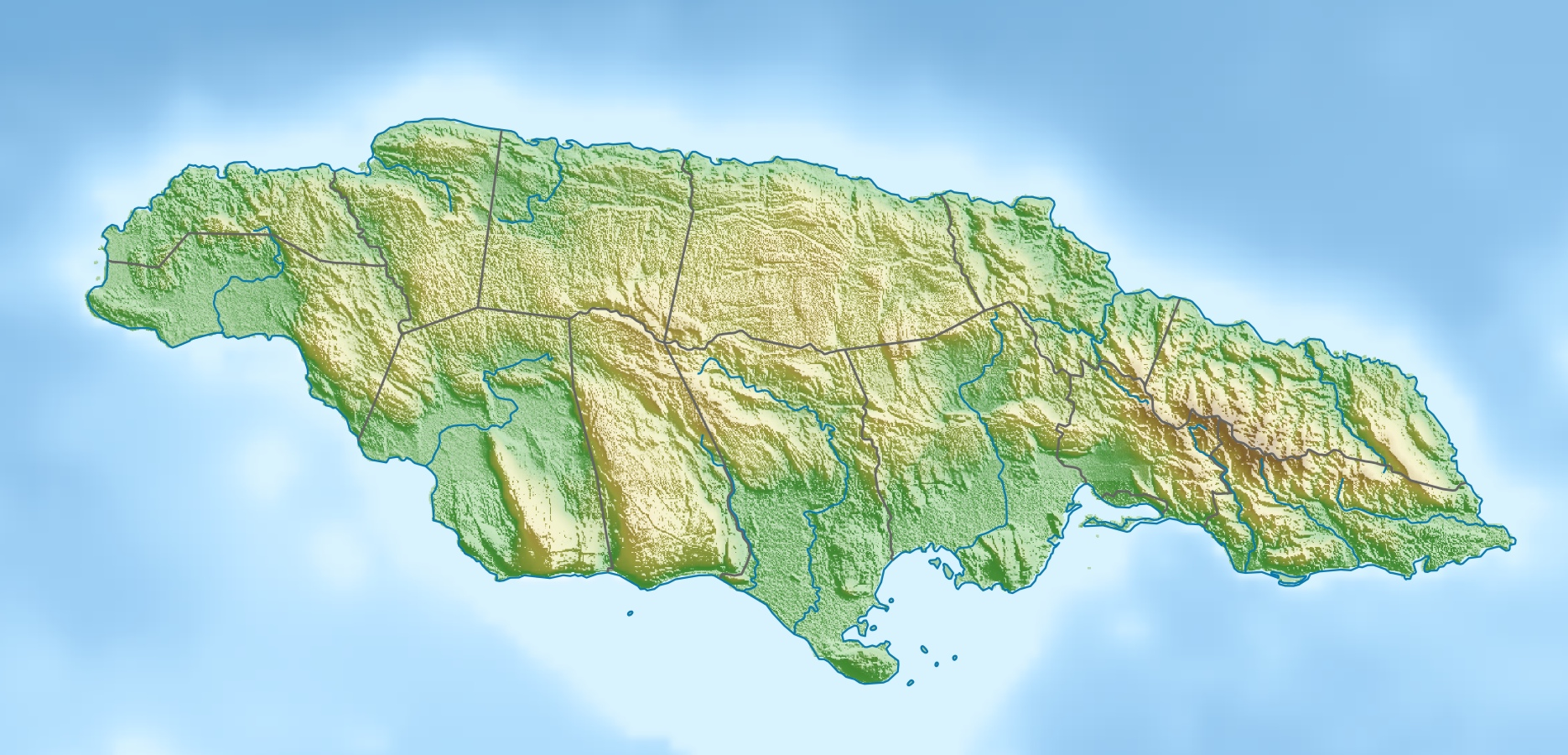
- Location in Jamaica
- Coordinates: 18.2978°N 77.2781°W
- Country: Jamaica
- County: Middlesex
- Parish: Saint Ann

Population (2009)
  - Total: 300
- Time zone: UTC-05:00 (EST)

Nine Mile (Jamaican Creole: Nain Mail or Nain Mailz) is a district in Saint Ann Parish, Jamaica, a few miles south of Brown's Town. The population was about 300 in 2009. On February 6, 1945, reggae musician Bob Marley was born in Nine Mile, and he was later buried there. The house in which Marley resided and the mausoleum in which his body and that of his mother Cedella Booker lies, is also located in Nine Mile.

== Bob Marley Mausoleum ==
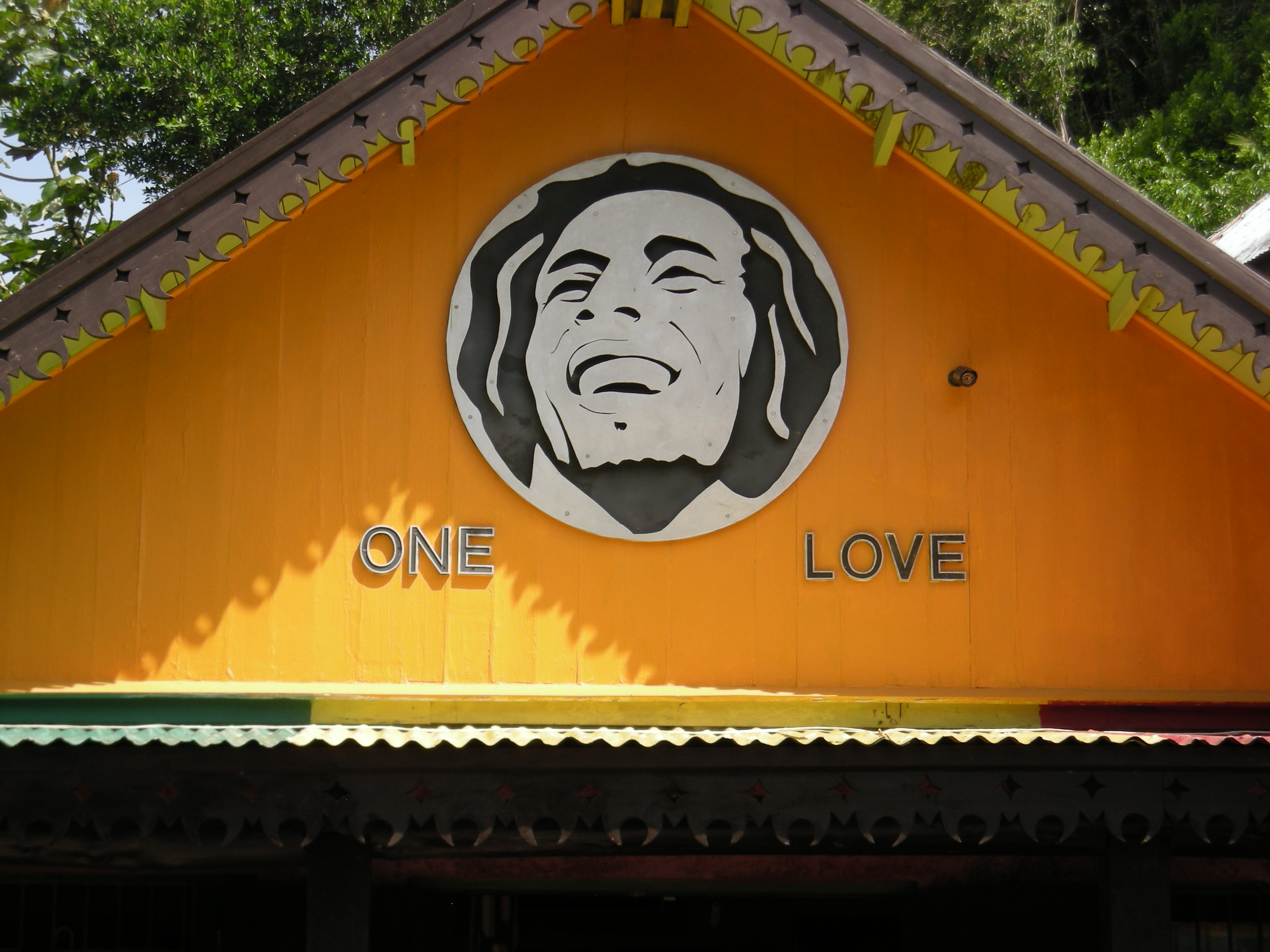
The entrance to the birthplace of reggae icon Bob Marley in Nine Mile

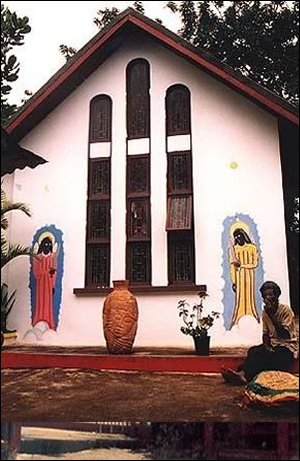
The Bob Marley Church and Mausoleum in Nine Mile

Nine Mile is where Bob Marley's musical career began and also influenced many of his songs.

The Bob Marley Mausoleum in Nine Mile is a tourist attraction managed by members of Bob Marley's living family. It features many of Marley's historical artifacts, including guitars, awards, and photographs.

There is a Rasta-colored ‘rock pillow’ on which Marley laid his head when seeking inspiration. His body lies buried along with his guitar in a 2.5 m-tall (8.2 ft) oblong marble mausoleum inside a small church of traditional Ethiopia design.

There are two mausoleums on the property. The first is that of Marley's mother, Cedella Booker, known as Mama Marley. The second contains Bob Marley's remains.
