= Fabian Marley =

Jamaican child of Bob Marley claimant

- Born: Fabian Marley; 27 July 1968 (age 57); Kingston, Jamaica
- Other names: Gong Kid

Fabian Marley (born 27 July 1968) is a Jamaican who was best known for his claim that Bob Marley was his father. These claims later proved to be false using DNA analysis. At the age of 12, Fabian and his mother relocated to Eastern Kingston, Jamaica. His first encounter with the music was with the Rainbow Band. While playing with the band he began working with The Skatalites. He garnered his style of music from mentors, Johnny Moore, Roland Alphanso, and other members from the band. After mastering the harmonica he then acquired piano skills and then later learned how to play the guitar.

== Musical career ==
Fabian was part of an upcoming band called Sounds of Rainbow. While working on their album and single they struggled from a tragic experience that led to the death of some of the band's members. Left with only Fabian, the lead drummer and the lead guitarist, the survivors of the band were forced to find new members. The result of this tragic experience led Fabian to step up to the plate and become the lead singer of the band.

In effort to continue with his music career, Fabian began recording at All Fruits Studio's, Cave Man Studio's and Afari Studio's. All the mixing and mastering was done at the Marley Estate owned Tuff Gong Recording Studios. Fabian's vision on his music came with the guidance from powerhouse producers Rohan "Snowcone" Fuller and Clive Hunt. Fabian's vision is to continue the work that Bob Marley started, and spreading the gospel of reggae music and unity worldwide. He continues to seek guidance from Bunny Wailer who has given him the most advice on his music career.

== Discography ==
TITLE	Date of Release	Performing artist(s)	Format(s)
"Plant Some Peas"	16 October 2014	Fabian Marley	Digital single
