= Punky Reggae Party =

Single by Bob Marley
- A-side: "Jamming"
- Released: 1977
- Recorded: July 1977
- Genre: Reggae
- Length: 9:19 (12-inch single A-side); 8:49 (12-inch single B-side); 4:25 ("Jamming" 7-inch B-side); 6:50 ("Jamming" 12-inch B-side)
- Label: Tuff Gong/Island
- Songwriter: Bob Marley
- Producer: Lee Perry

Bob Marley singles chronology
"Waiting in Vain" (1977)	"Punky Reggae Party" / "Jamming" (1977)	"Rastaman Live Up" (1978)

"Punky Reggae Party" is a song by Bob Marley, recorded and released in 1977. Not appearing on any studio album, it was released in 1977 as a 12-inch single in Jamaica only on the Tuff Gong and Lee Perry's Black Art labels, as a B-side to the "Jamming" single on Chris Blackwell's Island Records label in some countries and was later released as a live single on Babylon by Bus. Subsequently, it appeared on a number of compilations and "Best of" albums as well as the Deluxe Edition of Exodus and the 2002 CD reissue of Legend.

The version featured on the 2002 CD reissue of Legend is the B-side version from the "Jamming" 12-inch single. There is also a version of the song released as a B-side on the "Jamming" 7-inch single which is much shorter. The two versions of the song on the Jamaican 12-inch single were both featured on disc 2 of the Deluxe Edition of Exodus, alongside the versions on the B sides of the "Jamming" 7" and 12" singles.

The song was written by Bob Marley as a positive response to the release of a cover version of Junior Murvin's "Police and Thieves" by English punk band the Clash, on their first LP. Referring to the party of the title of the song, the lyrics mention several punk and reggae groups: "The Wailers will be there, the Damned, the Jam, the Clash – Maytals will be there, Dr. Feelgood too". Marley also often repeated the words "new wave, you brave" during the song. At one time, the list also included the Slits, but mention of them was removed allegedly because they were women.

According to a January 2014 interview with Midnight Raver, Sly Dunbar revealed that he played drums on this track. According to Dunbar, the drum track was recorded at Joe Gibbs's studio.

However, alternative sources list the personnel as follows:

- Bob Marley: Lead vocals, rhythm guitar
- Richard Daley: Bass
- Angus "Drummie Zeb" Gaye: Drums
- Michael "Ibo" Cooper: Keyboards
- Stephen "Cat" Coore: Lead guitar
- Aura Lewis: Backing vocals
- Candy McKenzie: Backing vocals.

The song was referred to in the Sublime song "Garden Grove" and the Robyn Hitchcock song "Antwoman". Adrian Sherwood of On-U Sound records has used the song title to define a zeitgeist at the end of the 1970s in England, saying of the period, "The Punky Reggae Party was full on. We thought we could change everything".

== Cover versions ==
In 2001, French punk band Burning Heads covered the song. It appeared on It's a Frenchy Ska Reggae Party Vol. 3 compilation.

In 2012, an American reggae band, Island Head, covered the song and named their debut album "Punky Reggae Party". Island Head musicians include Jamaican guitarist Mikey "Mao" Chung who is known for being part of the Peter Tosh band, and Andy Bassford, known for playing with Dennis Brown and Toots and the Maytals. Island Head's bandleader/producer Billy Messinetti played drums and percussion, David Frank of the band the System played all of the keyboards, trumpet player Don Harris is co-producer, Timmy Cappello played saxophone and Neil Jason (Brecker Brothers Band) played bass.

Katchafire's cover version appeared on the 2016 compilation, Stir It Up: Aotearoa's Tribute to Bob Marley.

== Track listing ==
1977 12" single

1. "Punky Reggae Party" – 9:19
2. "Punky Reggae Version" – 8:49
