= So Much Trouble in the World =

1979 single by Bob Marley and the Wailers

Single by Bob Marley and the Wailers

from the album Survival
- Released: 21 September 1979
- Studio: Tuff Gong Recording Studio, Kingston, Jamaica
- Genre: Reggae
- Length: 4:00 (album version): 3:50 (single version)
- Label: Tuff Gong, Island
- Songwriter: Bob Marley
- Producers: Bob Marley and the Wailers, Alex Sadkin

Bob Marley and the Wailers singles chronology
"Rastaman Live Up" (1978)	"So Much Trouble in the World" (1979)	"Survival" (1979)

Audio
- "So Much Trouble in the World" on YouTube

"So Much Trouble in the World" is a song by Bob Marley and the Wailers, which was released in 1979 off their album Survival released in the same year. It was written and performed by Jamaican musician Bob Marley. The song is a commentary on the state of the world, with lyrics that speak to the various problems and conflicts that exist, including poverty, inequality, war, and environmental degradation.

== Charts ==
Chart (1979)	Peak position
UK Singles (Official Charts)	56

== Certifications ==
Certifications for "So Much Trouble in the World"
Region	Certification	Certified units/sales
New Zealand (RMNZ)	Platinum	30,000^{‡}
^{‡} Sales+streaming figures based on certification alone.
