= Peace Medal of the Third World =

The Peace Medal of the Third World is an award given to those who helped fight for justice and peace in third world countries. The medal is awarded by the United Nations.

== Laureates ==
- Bob Marley, 1978
