= Don't Touch Me Tomato =

1949 song

"Tomato"

Single by June Nelson
- B-side: "Siesta"
- Released: 1949
- Venue: New York City, U.S.
- Genre: Calypso
- Length: 2:43
- Label: Jubilee 5014
- Songwriter: Sam Manning

"Don't Touch Me Tomato", originally published in 1949 simply as "Tomato", is a song written by Trinidadian musician Sam Manning, and usually performed in the style of calypso, mento, or rocksteady. The song is sometimes credited as "traditional", or ascribed (apparently in error) to the French writers Henri Lemarchand and Joseph Bouillon after it was recorded by Josephine Baker. It was first recorded in New York by June Nelson; other notable recordings have been by Marie Bryant (1952) and Phyllis Dillon (1968).

== History ==
The song seems to have first been recorded (as "Tomato") in New York in 1949, by singer June Nelson, with her piano and trio, and with Manning credited as the writer. The recording was listed as a calypso, and was released by Herb Abramson's Jubilee Records, catalogue number 5014. The song was then recorded in 1952 in London, by American singer Marie Bryant, accompanied by the Mike McKenzie Quintet featuring saxophonist Bertie King. McKenzie was from British Guiana (now Guyana), and King was from Jamaica. The record was produced by Denis Preston. First released on the Lyragon label – an offshoot of Polygon Records – Bryant's recording was soon issued in Jamaica by Ken Khouri on his Kalypso label, and in the United States (as "Don't You Touch Me Tomato") by Monogram Records.

In 1955, "Don't Touch Me Tomato" was recorded in Nassau by the Bahamian goombay musician George Symonette and his Calypso Sextette, and released on the LP Calypso and Native Bahamian Rhythms. This version has appeared on later compilations. Josephine Baker recorded the song in 1958, and it was released on her album Paris Mes Amours. Jamaican singer Phyllis Dillon recorded the song in 1968. Produced by Arthur "Duke" Reid on his Treasure Isle label, and typical of the rocksteady style, Dillon's recording became a big local hit and was also released in the UK.

== Lyrics ==
The song's lyrics are regarded as sexually suggestive. In the recording by Josephine Baker: "Please mister, don't you touch me tomato / No, don't touch me tomato / Touch me on me pumpkin, potato / For goodness' sake, don't touch me tomato/.... All you do is feel up, feel up/ Ain't you tired of feel up, feel up / All you do is squeeze up, squeeze up / Ain't you tired of squeeze up, squeeze up.."
