= Babylon by Bus =

Live album by Bob Marley and the Wailers
- Released: 10 November 1978
- Recorded: 25–27 June 1978 (Paris); 1975, 1976 (London)
- Genre: Reggae
- Length: 73:39
- Label: Tuff Gong/Island
- Producer: Bob Marley and the Wailers, Chris Blackwell, and Jack Nuber

Bob Marley and the Wailers chronology
Kaya (1978)	Babylon by Bus (1978)	Survival (1979)

Babylon by Bus is a live album released by Bob Marley and the Wailers in 1978. The tracks on this album are considered, with two exceptions, to be from the Pavillon de Paris concerts over 3 nights, 25–27 June 1978, during the Kaya Tour, though there are discrepancies in the track listing.

Like the 1973 album Catch a Fire, the first release had something of a novelty cover. The windows of the bus on the front cover were cut out, revealing part of the inner sleeve. As this was a double album, the listener had a choice of four different scenes to view through the windows.

== Set list ==
"Heathen", "Lively Up Yourself" and "Concrete Jungle" were not as common as the rest of the album on the tour, with 2 of the 3 more than likely played on any given night, but not always, and were only ever all played on the same night twice: at the Pinecrest Country Club in Shelton, Connecticut, 14 June and the Music Inn in Lenox, Massachusetts 18 June, which was one of the longest shows ever played by the band with 22 songs, but none were played at the Paris concerts. "Rebel Music", "Positive Vibration", "Jamming", "Exodus", "War / No More Trouble" and "Punky Reggae Party" were nearly always played at some point of each concert, though were mixed up some times with other songs like "Get Up, Stand Up", which does not appear on this album. The song "Is This Love" was also not common on this tour, though was played in Paris. The track "Kinky Reggae" was not played on the Kaya tour and in fact had not been played since the 1976 Rastaman Vibration tour, so it is unclear which concert this version is from.

== Critical reception ==
Professional ratings
Review scores
Source	Rating
AllMusic	5/5 stars
Christgau's Record Guide	B−

Rolling Stone wrote: "From the raucous invocation of Selassie's divinity that kicks off 'Positive Vibration' on side one to the unabashed good cheer of side four's wrap-up rendition of 'Jamming', we hear a new side of Bob Marley—fanciful, lovelorn, vulnerable—that's as riveting as any of his sulfurous early tirades."

== Track listing ==
=== Original album (1978) ===
Side one
No.	Title	Writer(s)	Length
1.	"Positive Vibration"	Vincent Ford	5:50
2.	"Punky Reggae Party"	Bob Marley, Lee Perry	5:51
3.	"Exodus"	Marley	7:41

Side two
No.	Title	Writer(s)	Length
4.	"Stir It Up"	Marley	5:17
5.	"Rat Race"	Rita Marley	3:41
6.	"Concrete Jungle"	Marley	5:37
7.	"Kinky Reggae"	Marley	4:46

Side three
No.	Title	Writer(s)	Length
8.	"Lively Up Yourself"	Marley	6:18
9.	"Rebel Music (3 O'Clock Roadblock)"	Aston Barrett, Hugh Peart	5:20
10.	"War / No More Trouble"	Allen Cole, Carlton Barrett, Marley	5:28

Side four
No.	Title	Writer(s)	Length
11.	"Is This Love"	Marley	7:27
12.	"The Heathen"	Marley	4:29
13.	"Jamming"	Marley	5:54

=== The Definitive Remasters edition (2001) ===
No.	Title	Writer(s)	Length
1.	"Positive Vibration"	Vincent Ford	5:50
2.	"Punky Reggae Party"	Bob Marley, Lee Perry	5:51
3.	"Exodus"	Marley	7:41
4.	"Stir It Up"	Marley	5:17
5.	"Rat Race"	Rita Marley	3:41
6.	"Concrete Jungle"	Marley	5:37
7.	"Kinky Reggae"	Marley	4:46
8.	"Lively Up Yourself"	Marley	6:18
9.	"Rebel Music (3 O'Clock Roadblock)"	Aston Barrett, Hugh Peart	5:20
10.	"War / No More Trouble"	Allen Cole, Carlton Barrett, Marley	5:28
11.	"Is This Love"	Marley	7:27
12.	"The Heathen"	Marley	4:29
13.	"Jamming"	Marley	5:54

== Personnel ==
=== Musicians ===
- Bob Marley – lead vocals, rhythm guitar
- Carlton Barrett – drums
- Aston "Family Man" Barrett – bass
- Tyrone "Organ D" Downie – keyboards
- Junior Marvin – lead guitar
- Alvin "Seeco" Patterson – percussion
- Al Anderson – lead guitar
- Earl "Wire" Lindo – keyboards
- Rita Marley – backing vocals
- Marcia Griffiths – backing vocals
- Judy Mowatt – backing vocals

=== Production ===
- Bob Marley and the Wailers – producer
- Chris Blackwell – producer
- Jack Nuber – engineering mixer
- Neville Garrick – graphic art
- Barry Diament, Rob Fraboni remastering audio engineer
- Ted Jensen – mastering engineer

== Charts ==
Chart performance for Babylon by Bus
Chart (1978–1979)	Peak position
Australian Albums (Kent Music Report)	34
Dutch Albums (Album Top 100)	4
New Zealand Albums (RMNZ)	21
Norwegian Albums (VG-lista)	15
Swedish Albums (Sverigetopplistan)	44
UK Albums (OCC)	40
US Billboard 200	103
US Top R&B/Hip-Hop Albums (Billboard)	58

2001 chart performance for Babylon by Bus
Chart (2001)	Peak position
French Albums (SNEP)	115

== Certifications ==
Certifications for Babylon by Bus
Region	Certification	Certified units/sales
France (SNEP)	Platinum	300,000^{*}
Germany (BVMI)	Gold	250,000^{^}
Netherlands (NVPI)	Platinum	100,000^{^}
United Kingdom (BPI)	Gold	100,000^{‡}
^{*} Sales figures based on certification alone.^{^} Shipments figures based on certification alone.^{‡} Sales+streaming figures based on certification alone.
