= Earl Lindo =

- Also known as: Wya, Wire
- Born: Earl Wilberforce Lindo; 7 January 1953; Kingston, Jamaica
- Died: 4 September 2017 (aged 64) London, England
- Genre: Reggae
- Occupation: Musician
- Instruments: Keyboards (piano, rhodes piano, organ, clavinet, synthesizers, mellotron), guitar
- Years active: 1970–2017
- Formerly of: Bob Marley & The Wailers, The Wailers Band

Earl Wilberforce "Wire" Lindo (7 January 1953 – 4 September 2017), sometimes referred to as Wya (the way it is pronounced), was a Jamaican reggae musician. He was a member of Bob Marley and the Wailers and collaborated with numerous reggae artists including Burning Spear.

== Biography ==
Earl spent his childhood "watching the plantation" along the St. James and Trelawny/border. While attending Excelsior High School in Kingston, he played with Barry Biggs, Mikey "Boo" Richards, and Ernest Wilson in the Astronauts, and later played organ in the band Now Generation, and with Tommy McCook and the Supersonics, and the Meters. Aston "Familyman" Barrett heard Lindo and recommended him to play for a Saturday afternoon television program Where It's At on JBC. Lindo also spent his early days working at Coxsone Dodd's Studio One, where he played on innumerable recordings.

In 1973, he was invited to join The Wailers on a US tour, going on to play on Burnin'. He left the Wailers in 1974 to join Taj Mahal's band.

Lindo can be heard on an album credited to the Impact All-Stars. Released in 1975, the album is a collection of dub tracks recorded at Randy's Studio 17. On his return to Jamaica he played on recordings by Big Youth, Culture, I Roy, and Al Brown, and had some success with solo singles "No Soul Today" and "Who Done It". In 1978 he rejoined the Wailers, playing on Babylon by Bus, Survival, and Uprising. Wya also partially wrote Redemption Song from the album, Uprising.

After Marley's death, Lindo was a member of The Wailers Band.

Lindo died in a London hospital on 4 September 2017, aged 64, shortly after being admitted with abdominal pain. Among the tributes paid, Olivia Grange, Jamaican Minister of Culture, Gender, Entertainment and Sport, described him as "an exceptionally gifted musician who played a pivotal role alongside Bob Marley and the Wailers in the global success of Jamaica's reggae music."

== Family ==
Lindo and his wife Marie had two daughters, and lived in London. He also has a son who resides in the United States.
