= Survival (Bob Marley and the Wailers album) =

Studio album by Bob Marley and the Wailers
- Released: 2 October 1979
- Recorded: January–February 1979
- Studios: Tuff Gong Recording Studio, Kingston, Jamaica
- Genre: Reggae
- Length: 38:02 (original); 44:25 (2001 remastered)
- Label: Island/Tuff Gong
- Producers: Bob Marley & The Wailers, Alex Sadkin

Bob Marley and the Wailers chronology
Babylon by Bus (1978)	Survival (1979)	Uprising (1980)

Singles from Survival
- 1. "So Much Trouble in the World" Released: 1979; 2. "Survival" Released: 1979; 3. "Zimbabwe" Released: 1979

Survival is the eleventh studio album by Bob Marley and the Wailers, released in 1979.

Survival is an album with an outwardly militant theme. Some critics speculate that this was due in part to criticism Marley received for the laid-back atmosphere of his previous release, Kaya, which seemed to sidetrack the urgency of his message. In the song "Africa Unite", Marley proclaims Pan-African solidarity. The song "Zimbabwe" is a hymn dedicated to then white-dominated Rhodesia. The song was performed at Zimbabwe's Independence Celebration in 1980, just after the official declaration of Zimbabwe's independence.

Survival was originally to be called Black Survival to underscore the urgency of African unity, but the name was shortened to prevent misinterpretations of the album's theme. The album was partially censored in South Africa because of their apartheid regime.

Professional ratings
Review scores
Source	Rating
AllMusic	3/5 stars
Christgau's Record Guide	B
Smash Hits	5/10

A sample of "Zimbabwe"

== Track listing ==
=== Original Tuff Gong LP ===
All tracks are written by Bob Marley, except where noted.

Side one
No.	Title	Length
1.	"So Much Trouble in the World"	4:00
2.	"Zimbabwe"	3:51
3.	"Top Rankin'"	3:10
4.	"Babylon System"	4:21
5.	"Survival"	3:53

Side two
No.	Title	Writer(s)	Length
6.	"Africa Unite"		2:54
7.	"One Drop"		3:51
8.	"Ride Natty Ride"		3:50
9.	"Ambush in the Night"		3:12
10.	"Wake Up and Live"	Bob Marley, Anthony Davis	4:58

=== Original Island Records LP ===
All tracks are written by Bob Marley, except where noted.

ILPS 9542 (1979) Side one
No.	Title	Writer(s)	Length
1.	"Wake Up and Live"	Bob Marley, Anthony Davis	4:58
2.	"Africa Unite"		2:54
3.	"One Drop"		3:51
4.	"Ride Natty Ride"		3:50
5.	"Ambush in the Night"		3:12

Side two
No.	Title	Length
6.	"So Much Trouble in the World"	4:00
7.	"Zimbabwe"	3:51
8.	"Top Rankin'"	3:10
9.	"Babylon System"	4:21
10.	"Survival"	3:53

=== Tuff Gong cassette ===
All tracks are written by Bob Marley, except where noted.

Jamaican pressing 7910 DP (circa 1984) Side one
No.	Title	Writer(s)	Length
1.	"Wake Up and Live"	Bob Marley, Anthony Davis	4:58
2.	"One Drop"		3:51
3.	"Ride Natty Ride"		3:50
4.	"Ambush in the Night"		3:12
5.	"Top Rankin'"		3:10

Side two
No.	Title	Length
6.	"Africa Unite"	2:54
7.	"So Much Trouble in the World"	4:00
8.	"Zimbabwe"	3:51
9.	"Babylon System"	4:21
10.	"Survival"	3:53

=== Island Records LP re-issue ===
All tracks are written by Bob Marley, except where noted. Issued by Island Records with a Tuff Gong disc label. Track list revised, all tracks on side A move to side B and vice versa.

ILPS 9542 (i) or ILPM 9542 (1986) Side one
No.	Title	Length
1.	"So Much Trouble in the World" (Bob Marley)	4:00
2.	"Zimbabwe"	3:50
3.	"Top Rankin'"	3:10
4.	"Babylon System"	4:36
5.	"Survival"	4:00

Side two
No.	Title	Writer(s)	Length
6.	"Africa Unite"		2:50
7.	"One Drop"		3:50
8.	"Ride Natty Ride"		3:50
9.	"Ambush in the Night"		3:10
10.	"Wake Up and Live"	Bob Marley, Anthony Davis	5:10

=== The Definitive Remastered edition (2001) ===
All tracks are written by Bob Marley, except where noted.

Current CD version
No.	Title	Writer(s)	Length
1.	"So Much Trouble in the World"		4:00
2.	"Zimbabwe"		3:51
3.	"Top Rankin'"		3:10
4.	"Babylon System"		4:21
5.	"Survival"		3:53
6.	"Africa Unite"		2:54
7.	"One Drop"		3:51
8.	"Ride Natty Ride"		3:50
9.	"Ambush in the Night"		3:12
10.	"Wake Up and Live"	Bob Marley, Anthony Davis	4:58
11.	"Ride Natty Ride" (12-inch mix)		6:23
Total length:			44:25

== Front cover ==
The album's front cover depicts 48 African flags and one Oceanian flag (Papua New Guinea). Zimbabwe (Zimbabwe Rhodesia at the time of the album's release) is represented by two political flags instead of a national flag.

Kenya	People's Republic of Angola	Ivory Coast	Ethiopian Empire	Chad	Egypt	Ghana
Senegal	Sierra Leone	Federal Republic of Cameroon	Tunisia	Niger	Second Nigerian Republic	Guinea
Gambia	Somali Democratic Republic (Note: While oriented correctly on the album's cover, this flag was shown upside-down on the album's included poster.)	Upper Volta	Zaire	Guinea-Bissau	Liberia	Swaziland
Democratic Republic of Madagascar	Togo	People's Republic of Mozambique	Central African Empire	Zimbabwe African People's Union	Seychelles	Zambia
Lesotho	Second Republic of Uganda	Algeria	Mali	Democratic Republic of Sudan	Botswana	Morocco
People's Republic of the Congo	Tanzania (Note: The flag is shown upside-down on the front cover and bears a darker shade of blue. The flag is correctly oriented on the poster.)	Burundi	Zimbabwe African National Union	Mauritius (1968–1992)	Republic of Mauritania (1960–1978)	Gabon
People's Republic of Benin	Equatorial Guinea	Papua New Guinea	Malawi	São Tomé and Príncipe	Djibouti	Rwandese Republic

Four states already sovereign by the time of the album's release didn't have their flags featured in its cover art, though they were featured in a poster that came with the album:

- Cape Verde
- State of the Comoros
- Libya Jamahiriya
- Namibia

Two non-sovereign regions that didn't have their flags included in the cover art are also featured on the poster:

- Réunion (Note: The flag used is a rectangular version of the flag of the Minister of Overseas France.)
- Western Sahara (Note: No flag is shown. Instead is a grey box with the text "TERRITORY IN DISPUTE (NO FLAG AT PRESENT)".)

Two nations' flags are greyed-out and are represented by numbers rather than names on the poster. An early, unused version of the poster included these flags.

- South Africa
- Zimbabwe Rhodesia

The album's title appears in white (City typeface) with the Brookes slave ship engraving in the background.

The cover was designed by Neville Garrick.

== Personnel ==
=== Musicians ===
- Bob Marley – lead vocals, rhythm guitar, acoustic guitar, percussion
- Aston "Family Man" Barrett – bass, rhythm guitar, percussion
- Carlton Barrett – drums, percussion
- Tyrone "Organ D" Downie – keyboards, percussion, backing vocals
- Alvin "Seeco" Patterson – percussion
- Junior Marvin – lead guitar, backing vocals
- Earl "Wire" Lindo – keyboards
- Al Anderson – lead guitar
- Rita Marley – backing vocals
- Marcia Griffiths – backing vocals
- Judy Mowatt – backing vocals
- Carlton "Santa" Davis – drums on "Africa Unite"
- Mikey "Boo" Richards – drums on "Wake Up And Live"
- Val Douglas – bass on "Wake Up and Live"
- Earl "Chinna" Smith – rhythm guitar and percussion on "One Drop"
- Headley Bennett – alto saxophone
- Ronald "Nambo" Robinson – trombone
- Melba Liston – trombone
- Luther Francois – trombone
- Junior "Chico" Chin – trumpet
- Jackie Willacy – trumpet
- Micky Hanson – trumpet
- Lee Jaffe – harmonica

=== Production ===
- Producers – Bob Marley & The Wailers, Alex Sadkin
- Mastering – Ted Jensen at Sterling Sound, NYC

== Charts ==
Chart performance for Survival
Chart (1979)	Peak position
Australian Albums (Kent Music Report)	32
Norwegian Albums Chart	10
New Zealand Albums Chart	14
Swedish Albums Chart	17
UK Albums Chart	20
US Billboard Top LPs & Tape	70
US Top Soul LPs (Billboard)	32

== Certifications ==
Certifications for Survival
Region	Certification	Certified units/sales
Canada (Music Canada)	Gold	50,000^{^}
France (SNEP)	Gold	100,000^{*}
New Zealand (RMNZ)	Gold	7,500^{‡}
Spain (Promusicae)	Platinum	100,000^{^}
United Kingdom (BPI)	Gold	100,000^{*}
^{*} Sales figures based on certification alone.^{^} Shipments figures based on certification alone.^{‡} Sales+streaming figures based on certification alone.
