= Cedella Booker =

Mother of Bob Marley (1926–2008)

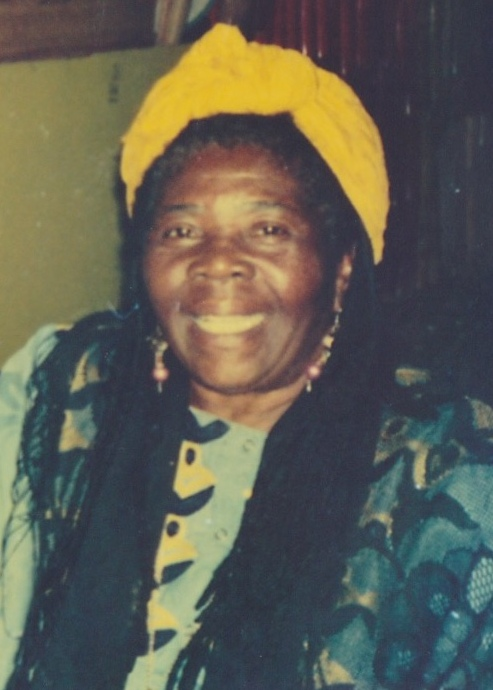
- Born: Sidilla Editha Malcolm; 23 July 1926; Saint Ann, Jamaica
- Died: 8 April 2008 (aged 81); Miami, Florida, U.S.
- Other name: Cedella Marley
- Occupations: Singer; author
- Spouses: Norval Marley (m. 1944; died 1955) Edward Booker (m. 1963; died 1976)
- Children: 4, including Bob
- Relatives: Sharon Marley (granddaughter); Cedella Marley (granddaughter); Ziggy Marley (grandson); Stephen Marley (grandson); Rohan Marley (grandson); Julian Marley (grandson); Ky-Mani Marley (grandson); Damian Marley (grandson); Skip Marley (great-grandson); YG Marley (great-grandson); Nico Marley (great-grandson); Jo Mersa Marley (great-grandson); Bambaata Marley (great-grandson); Selah Marley (great-granddaughter); Donisha Prendergast (great-granddaughter)
- Musical career
- Genres: Reggae; ska; soul; gospel
- Instrument: Vocals

Sidilla Editha "Cedella" Booker (previously Marley, née Malcolm; 23 July 1926 – 8 April 2008) was a Jamaican singer and author best known for being the mother of reggae musician Bob Marley.

== Biography ==
Booker was born Sidilla Editha Malcolm in Rhoden Hall, Saint Ann Parish, Jamaica, the daughter of Albertha Whilby and Omeriah Malcolm, a farmer, "bush doctor", and one of the most respected residents of Nine Mile. Her paternal grandfather was Robert "Uncle Day" Malcolm, who descended from the Coromantee (or Akan) slaves shipped to Jamaica from the Gold Coast, today known as Ghana, in the late seventeenth and early eighteenth centuries. At 18, she married 59-year-old Norval Sinclair Marley, a white Jamaican of English descent. She became pregnant with their son, Robert Nesta (whose middle name "Nesta" means "wise messenger"). After Norval's death in 1957, Booker and her son moved to Trenchtown, a slum neighborhood in Kingston. This was the only place Booker could afford to live at the time, being a young woman moving from the country to the city.

While living in Trenchtown, Booker gave birth to a daughter, Claudette Pearl, with Thaddeus Livingston, the father of Bunny Wailer, who formed the original Wailers trio with Bob Marley and Peter Tosh in 1963. She then married Edward Booker, an American civil servant, and resided first in Delaware, where she gave birth to two more sons, Richard and Anthony, with him. After Edward Booker's death in 1976, Cedella moved to Miami, Florida, where she was present at the deathbed of her famous son, who died from cancer in 1981. In 1990, Anthony was killed in a shootout with Miami police, after walking through a shopping mall with a 12-gauge shotgun and opening fire on responding police. Booker lived in Miami for the remainder of her life.

In 1993, Booker conceived and created what is today called the 9 Mile Music Festival, an annual music event held every year since in Miami to help keep alive Bob Marley's message of peace, love, and unity. As part of the admission fee to the one-day music festival, attendees bring canned goods that are collected and donated to help feed the needy in the Miami area through various local charities.

Called "the keeper of the flame," Booker grew voluminous dreadlocks, adopted her grandson Rohan, Bob Marley's son by Janet Hunt, and occasionally performed live with Marley's children, Ky-Mani, Ziggy, Stephen, Damian, and Julian. Later, she released the albums Awake Zion and Smilin' Island of Song. Cedella Booker participated in the festivities in Addis Ababa, Ethiopia, commemorating Marley's 60th birthday in 2005.

Booker died in her sleep from natural causes in Miami on 8 April 2008 at the age of 81. She was survived by her son Richard Booker and his children, Princess Booker (whose mother is Lucy Pounder, also the mother of Julian Marley), Crystal Booker and Zaya Booker.

== Works ==
Booker wrote two books on Bob Marley.

- Bob Marley: An Intimate Portrait by His Mother, which was published in 1997 by Penguin Books Ltd (UK), ISBN 978-0-14-025814-1
- Bob Marley, My Son, which was published in 2003 by Taylor Trade Publishing, ISBN 978-0-87833-298-4
