= Bob Marley =

Jamaican reggae musician (1945–1981)

The Honourable Bob Marley OM
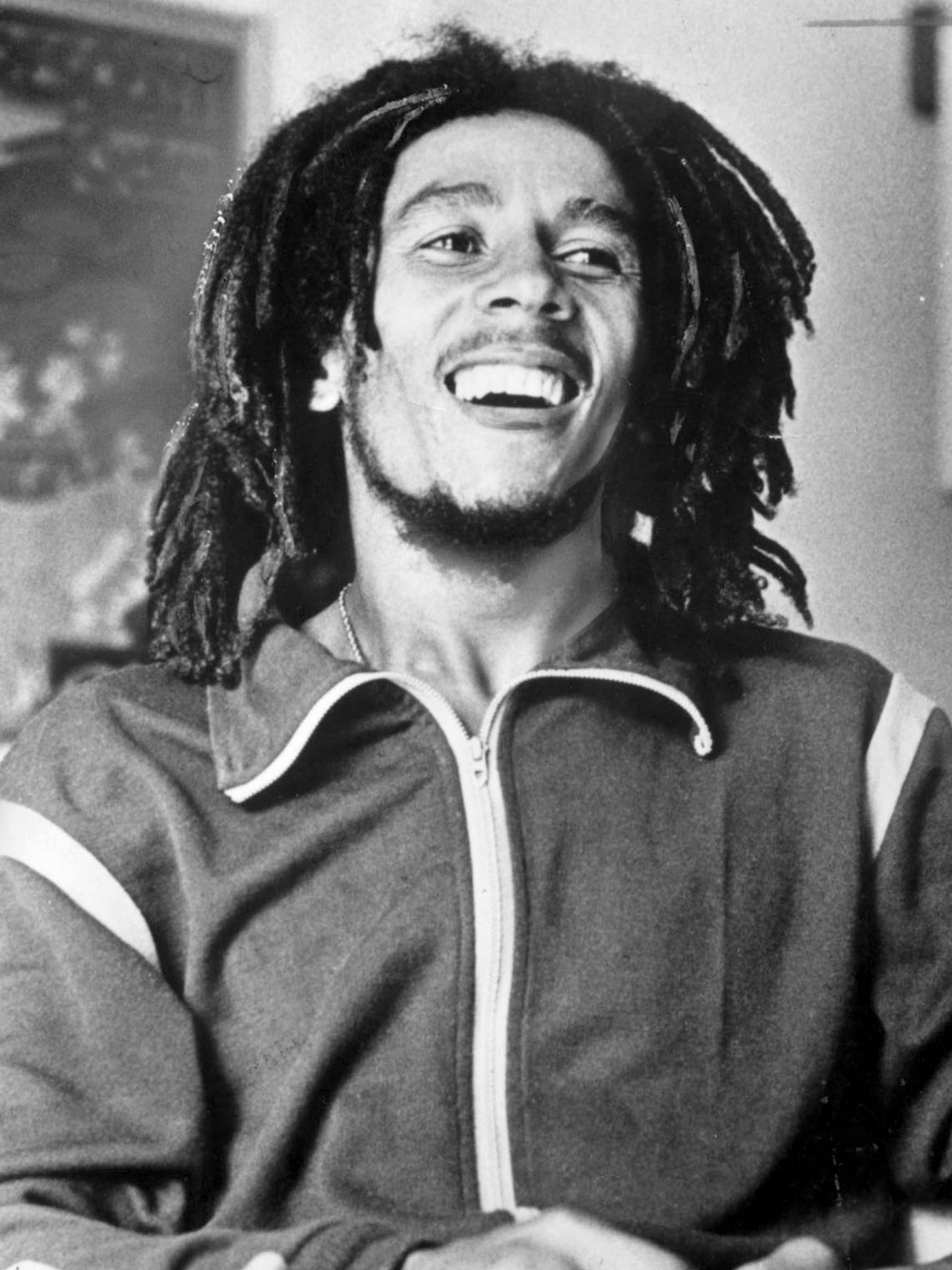
- Marley in 1976
- Born: Robert Nesta Marley; 6 February 1945; Nine Mile, Saint Ann, Colony of Jamaica
- Died: 11 May 1981 (aged 36); Miami, Florida, U.S.
- Resting place: Bob Marley Mausoleum, Nine Mile, Saint Ann Parish, Jamaica
- Other names: Berhane Selassie; Skip; Tuff Gong
- Occupations: Singer; songwriter; guitarist
- Years active: 1962–1980
- Spouse: Rita Marley (m. 1966)
- Children: 11, including: Sharon; Cedella; David "Ziggy"; Stephen; Rohan; Julian; Ky-Mani; Damian
- Parent(s): Norval Sinclair Marley (father); Cedella Booker (mother)
- Relatives: Skip Marley (grandson); YG Marley (grandson); Nico Marley (grandson); Jo Mersa Marley (grandson); Bambaata Marley (grandson); Selah Marley (granddaughter)
- Musical career
- Genres: Reggae; ska; rocksteady; folk
- Instruments: Vocals; guitar
- Labels: Beverley's; Studio One; JAD; Wail'n Soul'm; Upsetter; Tuff Gong; Island
- Formerly of: The Wailers
- Website: bobmarley.com

Robert Nesta Marley (6 February 1945 – 11 May 1981) was a Jamaican reggae singer, songwriter, and guitarist. Considered one of the pioneers of the genre, he was renowned for his distinctive vocal and songwriting style. Marley increased the visibility of Jamaican music worldwide and became a global figure in popular culture. He became known as a Rastafarian icon, and he infused his music with a sense of spirituality. Marley is also considered a global symbol of Jamaican music, culture and identity and was controversial in his outspoken support for democratic social reforms. Marley also supported the legalisation of cannabis and advocated for pan-Africanism.

Born in Nine Mile, Jamaica, Marley began his career in 1963, after forming the group Teenagers with Peter Tosh and Bunny Wailer, which became the Wailers. In 1965, they released their debut studio album, The Wailing Wailers, which included the single "One Love", a reworking of "People Get Ready". It was popular worldwide and established the group as a rising figure in reggae. The Wailers released 11 more studio albums, and after signing to Island Records, changed their name to Bob Marley and the Wailers. While initially employing louder instrumentation and singing, they began engaging in rhythmic-based song construction in the late 1960s and early 1970s, which coincided with Marley's conversion to Rastafari. Around this time, Marley relocated to London, and the group embodied their musical shift with the release of the album The Best of The Wailers (1971).

Bob Marley and the Wailers began to gain international attention after signing to Island and touring in support of the albums Catch a Fire and Burnin' (both 1973). Following their disbandment a year later, Marley carried on under the band's name. The album Natty Dread (1974) received positive reviews. In 1975, following the global popularity of Eric Clapton's version of Marley's "I Shot the Sheriff", Marley had his international breakthrough with his first hit outside Jamaica, a live version of "No Woman, No Cry", from the Live! album. This was followed by his breakthrough album in the United States, Rastaman Vibration (1976), which reached the Top 50 of the Billboard Soul Charts. A few months later, Marley survived an assassination attempt at his home in Jamaica, which was believed to be politically motivated. He permanently relocated to London, where he recorded the album Exodus, which incorporated elements of blues, soul, and British rock and had commercial and critical success. In 1977, Marley was diagnosed with acral lentiginous melanoma; he died in May 1981, shortly after baptism into the Ethiopian Orthodox Church. Fans around the world expressed their grief, and he received a state funeral in Jamaica.

The greatest hits album Legend was released in 1984 and became the best-selling reggae album of all time. Marley also ranks as one of the best-selling music artists of all time, with estimated sales of more than 75 million records worldwide. In February 1981, three months before his death, Marley was honoured with a designated Order of Merit, Jamaica's highest honour related to people involved with either the arts, literature or science. In 1994, Marley was posthumously inducted into the Rock and Roll Hall of Fame. Rolling Stone ranked him No. 11 on its list of the 100 Greatest Artists of All Time, and No. 98 on its list of the 200 Greatest Singers of All Time. His other achievements include a Grammy Lifetime Achievement Award, a star on the Hollywood Walk of Fame, and induction into the Black Music & Entertainment Walk of Fame.

== Early life ==
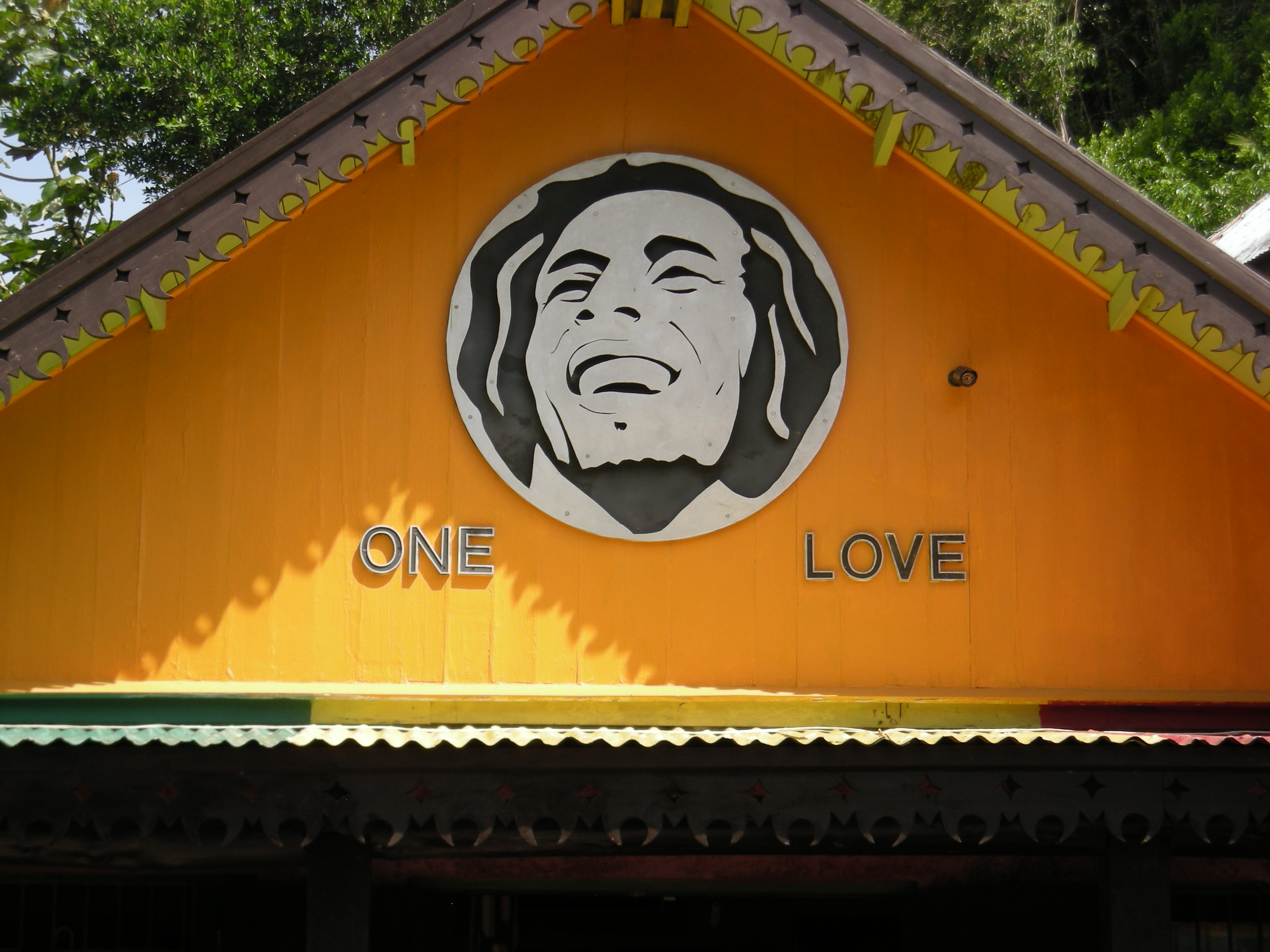
The residence where Marley was born, on a farm in Nine Mile, Jamaica, is a tourist attraction.

Marley was born on 6 February 1945 at the farm of his maternal grandfather in Nine Mile, Saint Ann Parish, Colony of Jamaica, to Norval Sinclair Marley and Cedella Malcolm. Norval was a white Englishman born in Crowborough, Sussex, England. His cousins claimed that the Marley surname had Syrian-Jewish origins, however this is speculative and not conclusive, and was refuted by Marley's biographer. Norval went by the moniker "Captain", despite only having been a private in the British Army. At the time of his marriage to Cedella Malcolm, an Afro-Jamaican then 18 years old, Norval was supervising a subdivision of land for war veteran housing, and he was about 60 years old at the time of Bob Marley's birth.

Norval, who provided little financial support for his wife and child and rarely saw them, died when Marley was 10 years old. Some sources state that Marley's birth name was Nesta Robert Marley, with a story that when Marley was still a boy, a Jamaican passport official reversed his first and middle names because Nesta sounded like a girl's name. Marley's maternal grandfather, Omariah, known as a Myal, was an early musical influence on Marley. Marley began to play music with Neville Livingston, later known as Bunny Wailer, while at Stepney Primary and Junior High School in Nine Mile, where they were childhood friends.

At age 12, Marley left Nine Mile with his mother and moved to the Trenchtown section of Kingston. Marley's mother and Thadeus Livingston, Bunny Wailer's father, had a daughter together named Claudette Pearl, who was a younger sister to both Bob and Bunny. With Marley and Livingston living together in the same house in Trenchtown, their musical explorations deepened to include the new ska music and the latest R&B from United States radio stations whose broadcasts reached Jamaica. Marley formed a vocal group with Bunny Wailer and Peter Tosh. The line-up was known variously as the Teenagers, the Wailing Rudeboys, the Wailing Wailers, and finally just the Wailers. Joe Higgs, who was part of the successful vocal act Higgs and Wilson, lived nearby and encouraged Marley. Marley and the others did not play any instruments at this time and were more interested in being a vocal harmony group. Higgs helped them develop their vocal harmonies and began teaching Marley guitar. Marley's mother later married Edward Booker, a civil servant from the United States, giving Marley two half-brothers: Richard and Anthony.

== Career ==
=== 1962–1972: Early years ===
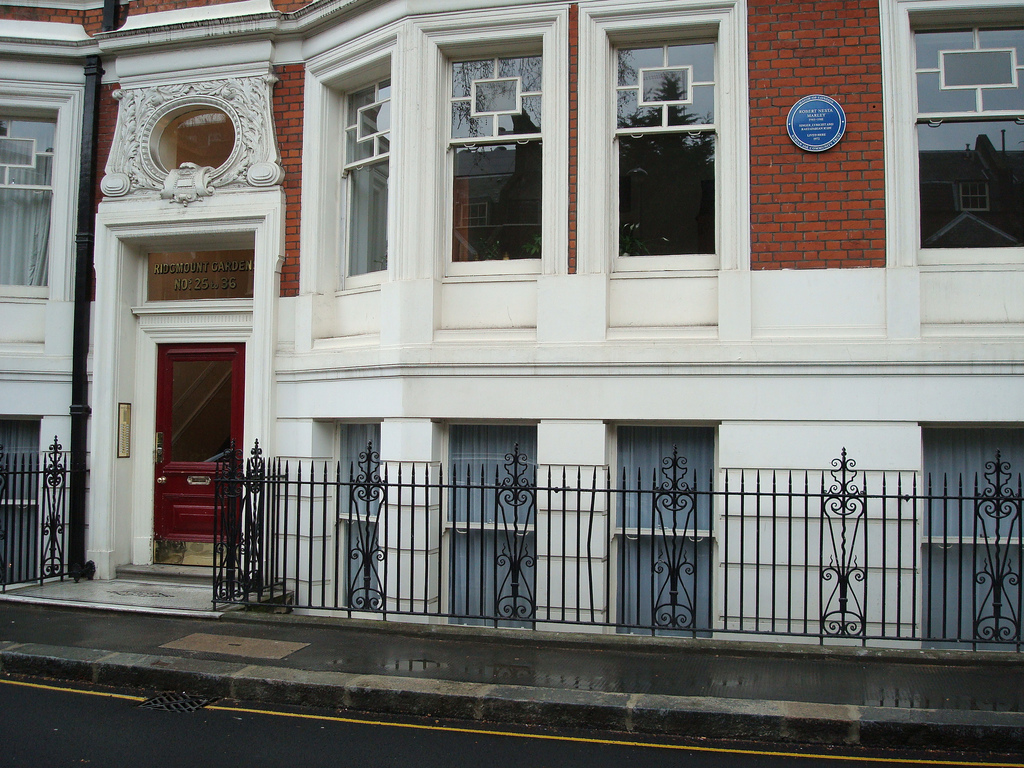
Marley's flat at 34 Ridgmount Gardens in London, where he lived in 1972

In February 1962, Marley recorded four songs, "Judge Not", "One Cup of Coffee", "Do You Still Love Me?" and "Terror", at Federal Studios for local music producer Leslie Kong. Three of the songs were released on Beverley's with "One Cup of Coffee" being released under the pseudonym Bobby Martell. In 1963, Bob Marley, Bunny Wailer, Peter Tosh, Junior Braithwaite, Beverley Kelso, and Cherry Smith were called the Teenagers. They later changed the name to the Wailing Rudeboys, then to the Wailing Wailers, at which point they were discovered by record producer Coxsone Dodd, and finally to the Wailers. Their single "Simmer Down" for the Coxsone label became a Jamaican No. 1 in February 1964 selling an estimated 70,000 copies. The Wailers, now regularly recording for Studio One, found themselves working with established Jamaican musicians such as Ernest Ranglin (arranger "It Hurts To Be Alone"), the keyboardist Jackie Mittoo and saxophonist Roland Alphonso. By 1966, Braithwaite, Kelso, and Smith had left the Wailers, leaving the core trio of Bob Marley, Bunny Wailer, and Peter Tosh.

In 1966, Marley married Rita Anderson, and moved near his mother's residence in Wilmington, Delaware, in the United States for a short time, during which he worked as a DuPont lab assistant, and on the assembly line and as a fork lift operator at a Chrysler plant in nearby Newark, under the alias Donald Marley. Though raised Pentecostal, Marley became interested in Rastafari beliefs in the 1960s, when away from his mother's influence. After returning to Jamaica, Marley formally converted to Rastafari and began to grow dreadlocks. After a financial disagreement with Dodd, Marley and his band teamed up with Lee "Scratch" Perry and his studio band, the Upsetters. Although the alliance lasted less than a year, they recorded what many consider the Wailers' finest work. Marley and Perry split after a dispute regarding the assignment of recording rights, but they would continue to work together.

1969 brought another change to Jamaican popular music, where the beat slowed down even further. The new beat was a slow, steady, ticking rhythm that was first heard on the Maytals song "Do the Reggay". Marley approached producer Leslie Kong, who was regarded as one of the major developers of the reggae sound. For the recordings, Kong combined the Wailers with his studio musicians called Beverley's All-Stars, which consisted of bassists Lloyd Parks and Jackie Jackson, drummer Paul Douglas, keyboardists Gladstone Anderson and Winston Wright, and guitarists Rad Bryan, Lynn Taitt, and Hux Brown. As David Moskowitz writes, "The tracks recorded in this session illustrated the Wailers' earliest efforts in the new reggae style. Gone are the ska trumpets and saxophones of the earlier songs, with instrumental breaks now being played by the electric guitar." The songs recorded would be released as the album The Best of The Wailers, including tracks "Soul Shakedown Party", "Stop That Train", "Caution", "Go Tell it on the Mountain", "Soon Come", "Can't You See", "Soul Captives", "Cheer Up", "Back Out", and "Do It Twice".

Between 1968 and 1972, Bob and Rita Marley, Peter Tosh and Bunny Wailer re-cut some old tracks with JAD Records in Kingston and London in an attempt to commercialise the Wailers' sound. Bunny later asserted that those songs "should never be released on an album... they were just demos for record companies to listen to". In 1968, Bob and Rita visited songwriter Jimmy Norman at his apartment in the Bronx. Norman had written the extended lyrics for "Time Is on My Side" (recorded by Irma Thomas and the Rolling Stones) and had also written for Johnny Nash and Jimi Hendrix. A three-day jam session with Norman and others, including Norman's co-writer Al Pyfrom, resulted in a 24-minute tape of Marley performing several of his own and Norman-Pyfrom's compositions. According to reggae archivist Roger Steffens, this tape is rare in that it was influenced by pop rather than reggae, as part of an effort to break Marley into the US charts. According to an article in The New York Times, Marley experimented on the tape with various sounds, adopting a doo-wop style on "Stay With Me" and "the slow love song style of 1960s artists" on "Splish for My Splash". He lived in Ridgmount Gardens, Bloomsbury, during 1972.

=== 1972–1974: Move to Island Records ===
In 1972, Bob Marley signed with CBS Records in London and embarked on a UK tour with soul singer Johnny Nash. While in London the Wailers asked their road manager Brent Clarke to introduce them to Chris Blackwell, who had licensed some of their Coxsone releases for his Island Records. The Wailers intended to discuss the royalties associated with these releases; instead, the meeting resulted in the offer of an advance of £4,000 (approx. £26,000 today) to record an album. Since Jimmy Cliff, Island's top reggae star, had recently left the label, Blackwell was primed for a replacement. In Marley, Blackwell recognised the elements needed to snare the rock audience: "I was dealing with rock music, which was really rebel music. I felt that would really be the way to break Jamaican music. But you needed someone who could be that image. When Bob walked in, he really was that image." The Wailers returned to Jamaica to record at Harry J's in Kingston, which resulted in the album Catch a Fire.

Primarily recorded on an eight-track, Catch a Fire marked the first time a reggae band had access to a state-of-the-art studio and were accorded the same care as their rock 'n' roll peers. Blackwell desired to create "more of a drifting, hypnotic-type feel than a reggae rhythm", and restructured Marley's mixes and arrangements. Marley travelled to London to supervise Blackwell's overdubbing of the album at Island Studios, which included tempering the mix from the bass-heavy sound of Jamaican music and omitting two tracks.

The Wailers' first album for Island, Catch a Fire, was released worldwide in April 1973, packaged like a rock record with a unique Zippo lighter lift-top. Initially selling 14,000 units, it received a positive critical reception. It was followed later that year by the album Burnin', which included the song "I Shot the Sheriff". Eric Clapton was given the album by his guitarist George Terry in the hope that he would enjoy it. Clapton was impressed and chose to record a cover version of "I Shot the Sheriff", which became his first US hit since "Layla" two years earlier and reached number 1 on the Billboard Hot 100 on 14 September 1974. Many Jamaicans were not keen on the new reggae sound on Catch a Fire, but the Trenchtown style of Burnin found fans across both reggae and rock audiences. The Wailers disbanded in 1974, with each of the three main members pursuing a solo career. During this period, Blackwell gifted his Kingston residence and company headquarters at 56 Hope Road (then known as Island House) to Marley. Housing Tuff Gong Studios, the property became not only Marley's office but also his home.

=== 1974–1976: Line-up changes ===
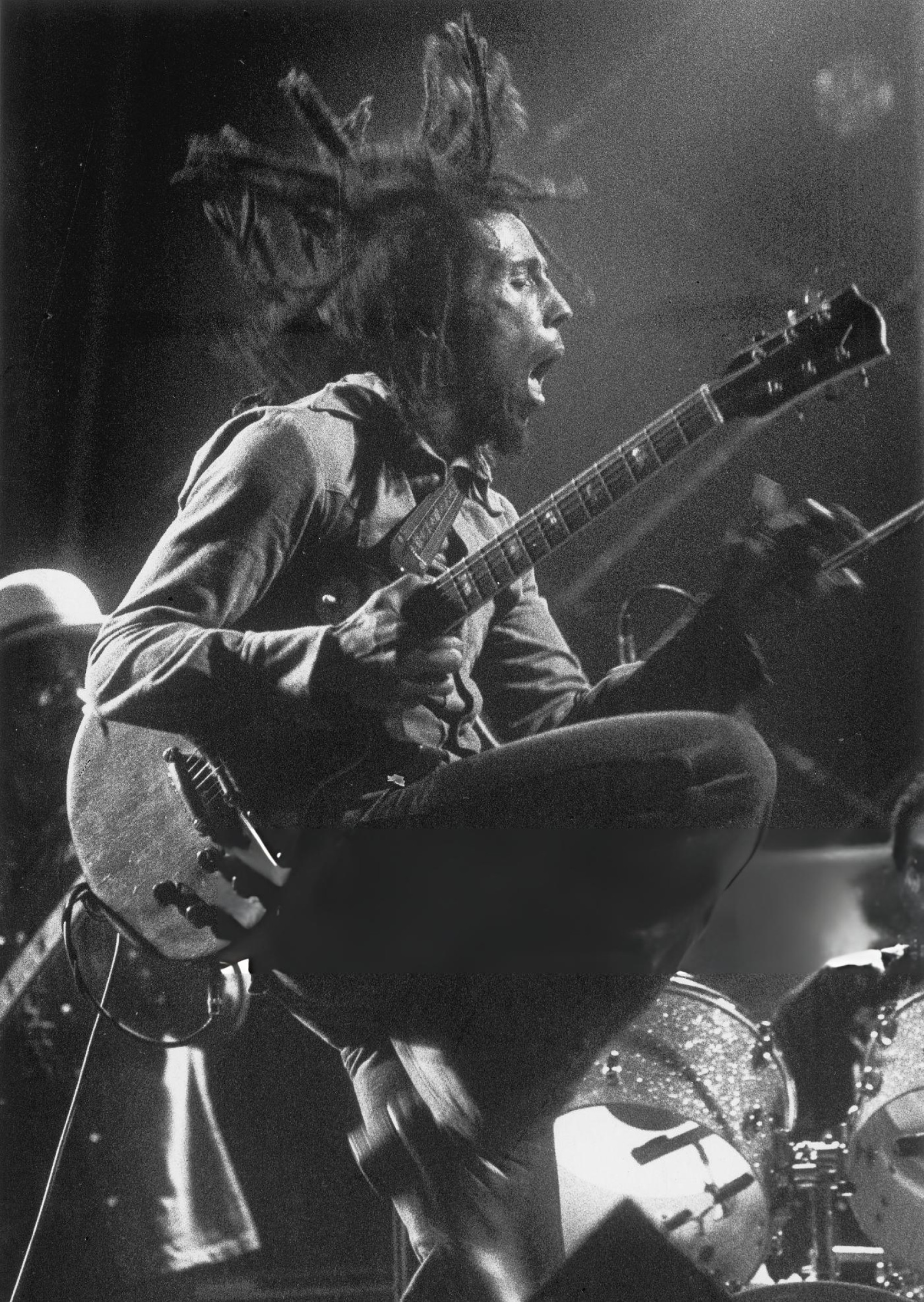
Marley performing in 1975

Despite the break-up, Marley continued recording as "Bob Marley & The Wailers". His new backing band included brothers Carlton and Aston "Family Man" Barrett on drums and bass respectively, Junior Marvin and Al Anderson on lead guitar, Tyrone Downie and Earl "Wya" Lindo on keyboards, and Alvin "Seeco" Patterson on percussion. The "I Threes", consisting of Judy Mowatt, Marcia Griffiths, and Marley's wife, Rita, provided backing vocals. In 1975, Marley had his international breakthrough with his first hit outside Jamaica with a live version of "No Woman, No Cry", from the Live! album. This was followed by his breakthrough album in the United States, Rastaman Vibration (1976), which reached the Top 50 of the Billboard Soul Charts.

==== Assassination attempt ====
On 3 December 1976, two days before "Smile Jamaica", a free concert organised by Jamaican Prime Minister Michael Manley in an attempt to ease tension between two warring political groups, Bob Marley, Rita, and manager Don Taylor were wounded in an assault by unknown gunmen inside Marley's home. Taylor and Rita sustained serious injuries but later made full recoveries. Marley sustained minor wounds in the chest and arm. The attempt on his life was believed to have been politically motivated, as many felt that Smile Jamaica was actually a support rally for Manley. Nonetheless, the concert proceeded, and an injured Marley performed as scheduled, two days after the attempt. The members of the group Zap Pow played as Bob Marley's backup band before a festival crowd of 80,000 while members of The Wailers were still missing or in hiding.

=== 1976–1979: Relocation to England ===
Marley left Jamaica at the end of 1976, and after a month-long "recovery and writing" sojourn at the site of Chris Blackwell's Compass Point Studios in Nassau, Bahamas, arrived in England, where he spent two years in self-imposed exile. On four successive nights, from 1–4 June 1977, he played with the Wailers at the Rainbow Theatre in London. The concert highlights were recorded in the BBC documentary Bob Marley: Live at the Rainbow 1977.

Whilst in England, Marley recorded the albums Exodus and Kaya. In 1978, he recorded the video for the single, "Is This Love", from the Kaya album at the Keskidee centre, a Black-led theatre and arts centre in London. The model Naomi Campbell was one of the children who performed in the video. Exodus stayed on the British album charts for 56 consecutive weeks. It included four UK hit singles: "Exodus", "Waiting in Vain", "Jamming", and "One Love" (which interpolates Curtis Mayfield's hit, "People Get Ready"). During his time in London, Marley was arrested and convicted of possession of a small quantity of cannabis. In 1978, Marley returned to Jamaica and performed at another political concert, the One Love Peace Concert, again in an effort to calm warring parties. Near the end of the performance, by Marley's request, Michael Manley (leader of then-ruling People's National Party) and his political rival Edward Seaga (leader of the opposing Jamaica Labour Party) joined each other on stage and shook hands. Under the name Bob Marley and the Wailers, 11 albums were released, four live albums and seven studio albums. The releases included Babylon by Bus, a double live album with 13 tracks, was released in 1978 and received critical acclaim. This album, and specifically the final track "Jamming", with the audience in a frenzy, captured the intensity of Marley's live performances.

"Marley wasn't singing about how peace could come easily to the World but rather how hell on Earth comes too easily to too many. His songs were his memories; he had lived with the wretched, he had seen the downpressers and those whom they pressed down."

— Mikal Gilmore, Rolling Stone

=== 1979–1980: Later years ===
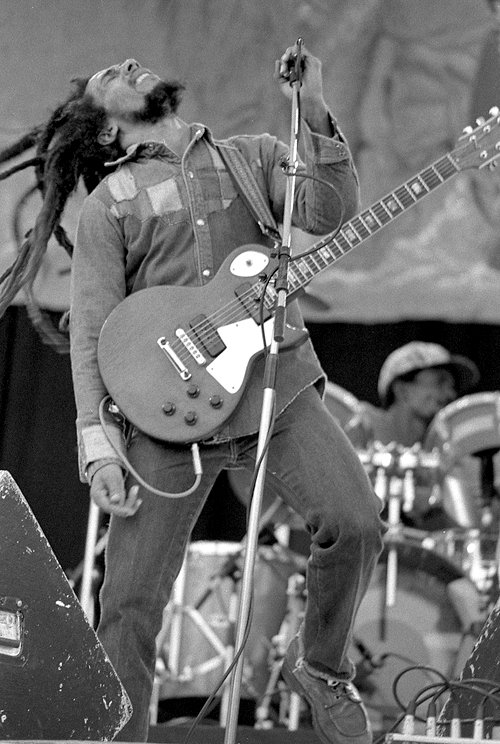
Marley performing in Ireland in July 1980

Survival, a defiant and politically charged album, was released in 1979. Tracks such as "Zimbabwe", "Africa Unite", "Wake Up and Live" and "Survival" reflected Marley's support for the struggles of Africans. His appearance at the Amandla Festival in Boston in July 1979 showed his strong opposition to South African apartheid, which he already had shown in his song "War" in 1976. In early 1980, Marley was invited to perform at a 17 April celebration of Zimbabwe's Independence Day.

Uprising (1980) was Marley's final studio album and the last album that was released during his lifetime. It is one of his most religious productions, as it includes "Redemption Song" and "Forever Loving Jah". Confrontation, released posthumously in 1983, contained unreleased material recorded during Marley's lifetime, including the hit "Buffalo Soldier" and new mixes of singles previously available only in Jamaica.

== Personal life ==
=== Religion and beliefs ===
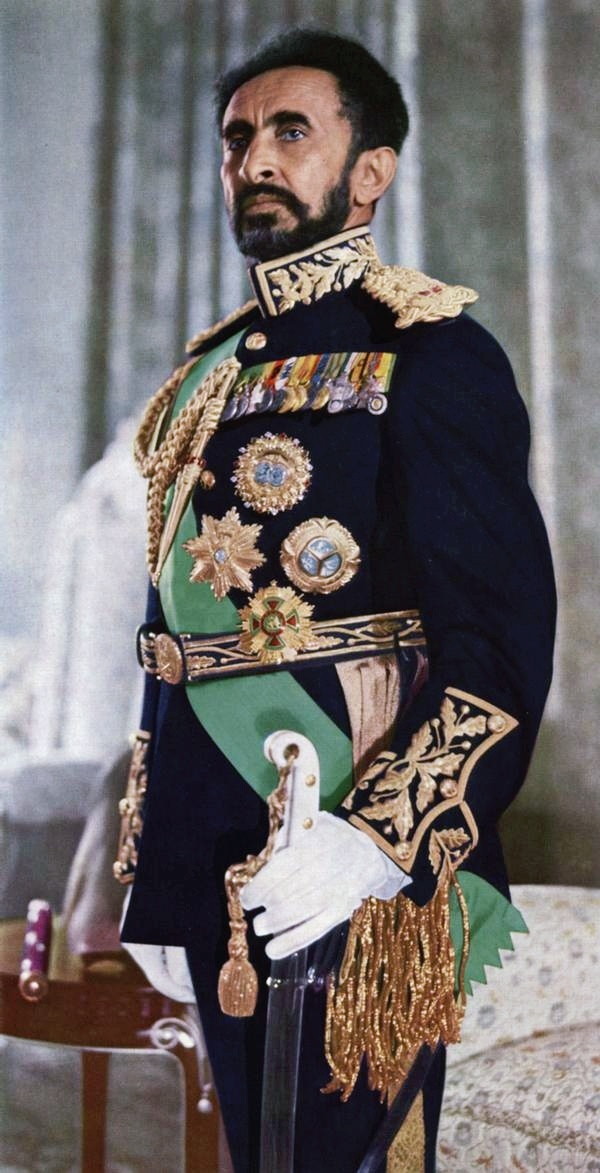
Haile Selassie I, Emperor of Ethiopia from 1930 to 1974, was one of Marley's inspirations.

Marley was a longtime member of the Rastafari movement, whose culture was a key element in the development of reggae. He became an ardent proponent of Rastafari, taking its music out of the socially deprived areas of Jamaica and onto the international music scene. As part of being a Rastafarian, Marley felt that Haile Selassie I of Ethiopia was an incarnation of God or "Jah". However, later in life, he ended up converting to Ethiopian Orthodox Christianity and was baptised by Archbishop Abuna Yesehaq in the presence of his wife Rita Marley and their children, with the name of Berhane Selassie, on 4 November 1980, shortly before his death.

During the time that he was a Rastafarian, Marley supported the legalisation of cannabis or "ganja", which Rastafarians believe is an aid to meditation. Marley began to use cannabis when he converted to the Rastafari faith from Catholicism in 1966. Marley was arrested in 1968 after being caught with cannabis but continued to use marijuana in accordance with his religious beliefs. Of his marijuana usage, Marley said, "When you smoke herb, herb reveal yourself to you. All the wickedness you do, the herb reveal itself to yourself, your conscience, show up yourself clear, because herb make you meditate. Is only a natural thing and it grow like a tree." Marley saw marijuana usage as a vital factor in religious growth and connection with Jah, and as a way to philosophise and become wiser.

Marley was a pan-Africanist and believed in the unity of African people worldwide. His beliefs were rooted in his Rastafari religious beliefs. Marley was substantially inspired by Marcus Garvey and had anti-imperialist and pan-Africanist themes in many of his songs, such as "Zimbabwe", "Exodus", "Survival", "Blackman Redemption", and "Redemption Song". The lattermost draws influence from a 1937 speech given by Marcus Garvey in Nova Scotia. Marley held that independence of African countries from European domination was a victory for all those in the African diaspora. In the song "Africa Unite", he sang of a desire for all peoples of the African diaspora to come together and fight against "Babylon"; similarly, in the song "Zimbabwe", Marley marked the liberation of the whole continent of Africa, and evoked calls for unity between all Africans, both within and outside Africa.

=== Family ===
Marley married Alfarita Constantia "Rita" Anderson in Kingston, Jamaica, on 10 February 1966. He had many children: three were born to his wife Rita, and two additional children were adopted from Rita's previous relationships as his own, and they have the Marley name. The official Bob Marley website acknowledges 11 children. Those listed on the official site are:

1. Sharon, born 23 November 1964, daughter of Rita from a previous relationship, but then adopted by Marley after his marriage with Rita
2. Cedella, born 23 August 1967, to Rita
3. David "Ziggy", born 17 October 1968, to Rita
4. Stephen, born 20 April 1972, to Rita
5. Robert "Robbie", born 16 May 1972, to Pat Williams
6. Rohan, born 19 May 1972, to Janet Hunt
7. Karen Marley, born 1973, to Janet Bowen
8. Stephanie Marley, born 17 August 1974 to Rita and Owen "Ital Tacky" Stewart, a former Jamaican football (soccer) player. Nonetheless, he adopted Stephanie as one of his own and entitled her to his estate.
9. Julian, born 4 June 1975, to Lucy Pounder
10. Ky-Mani, born 26 February 1976, to Anita Belnavis
11. Damian, born 21 July 1978, to Cindy Breakspeare

Other sites cited additional individuals who claim to be family members:

- Makeda was born on 30 May 1981, after Marley's death, to Yvette Anderson, also known as Yvette Morris or Yvette Morris-Anderson and as Yvette Crichton after the surname of her husband. Meredith Dixon's book lists her as Marley's child; but the Bob Marley official website does not.
- Various websites also listed Imani Carole, born 22 May 1963, to Cheryl Murray, but the Bob Marley website does not.

Marley had several notable grandchildren, including musicians Skip Marley and YG Marley, American football player Nico Marley, model Selah Marley, and filmmaker Donisha Prendergast.

In 2004, Rita alleged that Marley raped her in 1973. She later said that British tabloids exaggerated the issue, saying the media was "out to get her".

=== Football ===
Aside from music, football (soccer) played a major role throughout Marley's life. As well as playing the game, in parking lots, fields, and even inside recording studios, Marley followed the Brazilian club Santos and its star player Pelé growing up, and was also a supporter of English football club Tottenham Hotspur and Argentine midfielder Ossie Ardiles, who played for the club for a decade beginning in 1978. Marley surrounded himself with people from the sport, and in the 1970s, made the Jamaican international footballer Allan "Skill" Cole his tour manager. Marley told a journalist, "If you want to get to know me, you will have to play football against me and the Wailers."

=== Automobiles ===
Two of the cars that Marley owned were BMWs, a 1602 and then a BMW 2500. He purchased these because of the name. Marley said BMW stood for Bob Marley and the Wailers.

== Illness and death ==
In July 1977, Marley was diagnosed with a type of skin cancer under the nail of his right big toe. Contrary to urban legend, this lesion was not primarily caused by an injury during a football match that year but was instead a symptom of already-existing cancer. Marley had to see two doctors before a biopsy was done, which confirmed acral lentiginous melanoma. Unlike other melanomas, which usually appear on skin exposed to the sun, acral lentiginous melanoma occurs in places that are easy to miss, such as the soles of the feet, or under toenails. Although it is the most common melanoma in people with dark skin, it is not widely recognised and was not mentioned in the most popular medical textbook of the time. Marley rejected his doctors' advice to have his toe amputated, which would have hindered his performing career, citing religious beliefs. Instead, the nail and nail bed were removed, and a skin graft was taken from his thigh to cover the area. Despite his illness, Marley continued touring and was in the process of scheduling a 1980 world tour.

The album Uprising was released in May 1980. The band completed the European leg of the Uprising Tour, playing its biggest concert to 100,000 people at San Siro stadium in Milan, Italy. Marley's final outdoor concert was played on 6 July 1980 at Dalymount Park in Dublin, Ireland. The tour continued in the United States, where Marley performed two shows at Madison Square Garden in New York City. On 21 September 1980, Marley collapsed while jogging in Central Park and was taken to the hospital, where it was found that his cancer had spread to his brain, lungs, and liver. Marley's last concert took place two days later at the Stanley Theater (now The Benedum Center For The Performing Arts) in Pittsburgh, Pennsylvania. The only known photographs from the show were included in Kevin Macdonald's 2012 documentary film Marley. Shortly after, Marley's health deteriorated as his cancer had spread throughout his body. The rest of the tour was cancelled, and Marley sought treatment at the Josef Issels' clinic in Rottach-Egern, Bavaria, Germany, where he underwent an alternative cancer treatment called Issels treatment, partly based on avoidance of certain foods, fluids, and other substances.

After eight months of the alternative treatment failing to effectively treat his advancing cancer, Marley boarded a plane for his home in Jamaica. During the flight, his vital functions worsened. The flight was diverted to Miami, Florida, where he was taken to Cedars of Lebanon Hospital (now the University of Miami Hospital). He died there shortly afterwards on 11 May 1981, at the age of 36, due to the spread of cancer to his lungs and brain. Marley's final words to his son Ziggy were: "On your way up, take me up. On your way down, don't let me down." It has long been believed that Marley said "Money can't buy life" at the end of his final words. However, Ziggy Marley himself confirmed that his father never said "Money can't buy life."

On 21 May 1981, Marley was given a state funeral in Jamaica that combined elements of Ethiopian Orthodoxy, as well as Rastafari tradition. He was buried in a chapel near his birthplace in Nine Mile; Marley's casket contained his red Gibson Les Paul guitar, a Bible opened at Psalm 23, and a stalk of cannabis placed there by his widow Rita Marley. Prime Minister Edward Seaga delivered the final funeral eulogy to Marley, saying:

His voice was an omnipresent cry in our electronic world. His sharp features, majestic looks, and prancing style a vivid etching on the landscape of our minds. Bob Marley was never seen. He was an experience which left an indelible imprint with each encounter. Such a man cannot be erased from the mind. He is part of the collective consciousness of the nation.

== Legacy ==
=== Awards and honours ===
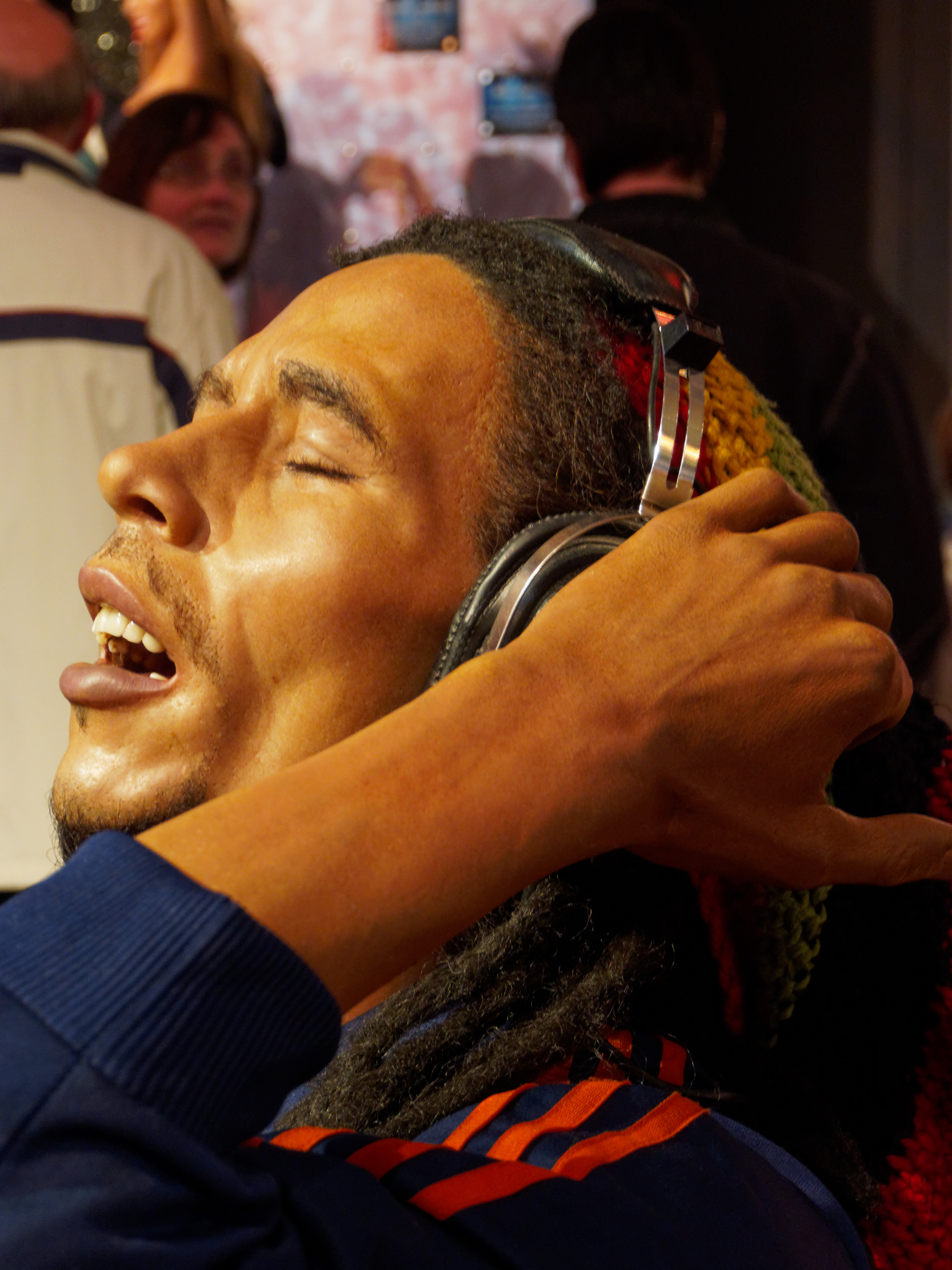
A wax sculpture of Marley at Madame Tussauds in London

- 1976: Rolling Stone magazine's "Band of the Year"
- June 1978: Awarded the Peace Medal of the Third World from the United Nations
- February 1981: Awarded the Jamaican Order of Merit, then the nation's third-highest honour
- March 1994: Inducted into the Rock and Roll Hall of Fame
- 1999: "Album of the Century" for Exodus by Time magazine
- February 2001: A star on the Hollywood Walk of Fame
- February 2001: Awarded Grammy Lifetime Achievement Award.
- 2004: Rolling Stone ranked him 11th on their list of the "100 Greatest Artists of All Time"
  - Among the first inductees into the UK Music Hall of Fame
  - "One Love" named song of the millennium by BBC
  - Voted one of the greatest lyricists of all time by a BBC poll
- 2006: A blue plaque at his first UK residence in Ridgmount Gardens in London, dedicated to him by the Nubian Jak Community Trust and supported by the Mayor of London
- 2010: Catch a Fire inducted into the Grammy Hall of Fame (Reggae Album)
- 2022: Inducted into the Black Music & Entertainment Walk of Fame
- 2025: on 25 October, a green plaque was installed by the London Borough of Wandsworth, in partnership with Nubian Jak Community Trust, to commemorate Marley's visits to the borough, where he and his band members spent time playing football in Battersea Park.

=== Other tributes ===
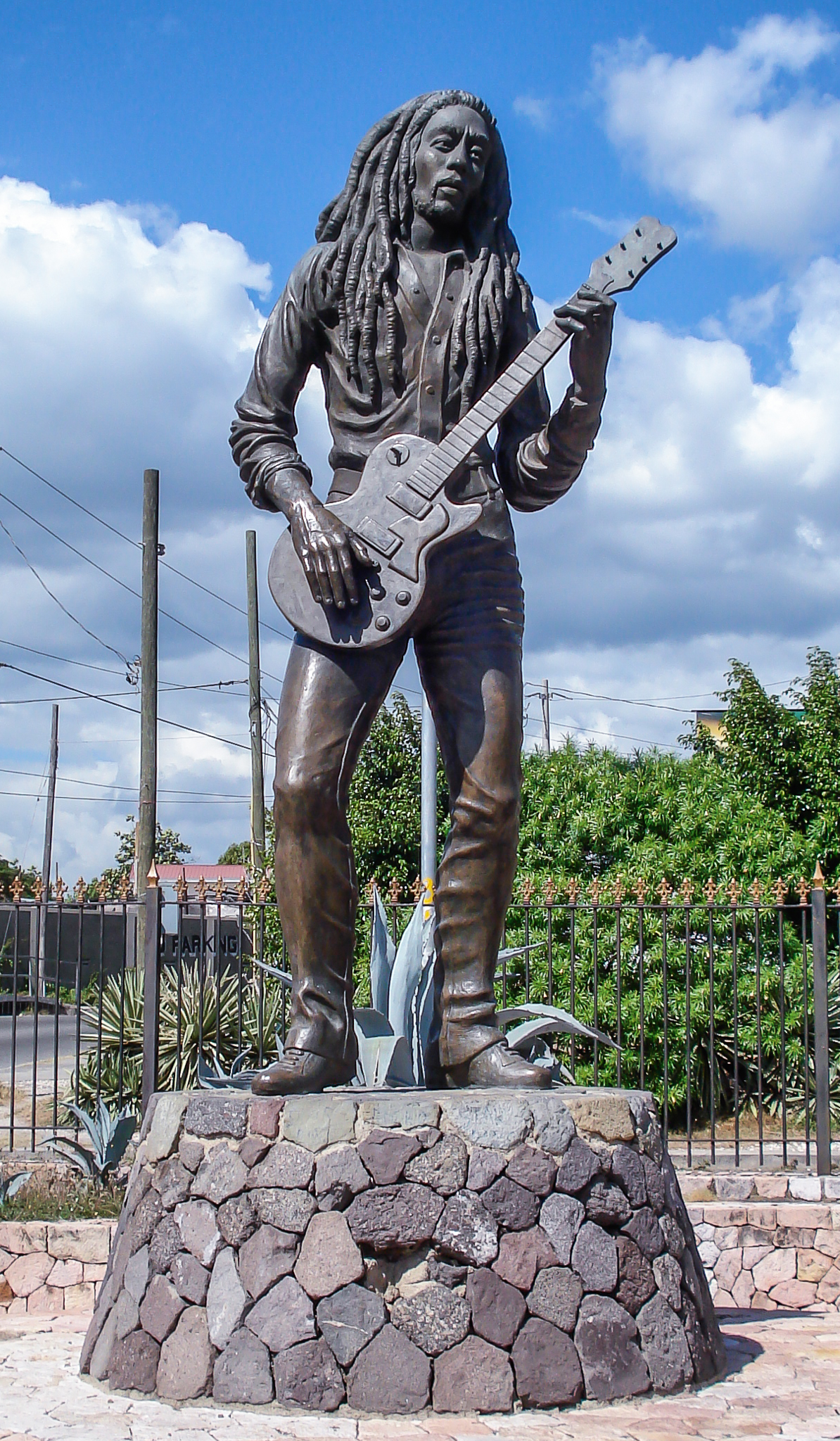
Bob Marley statue in Kingston, Jamaica

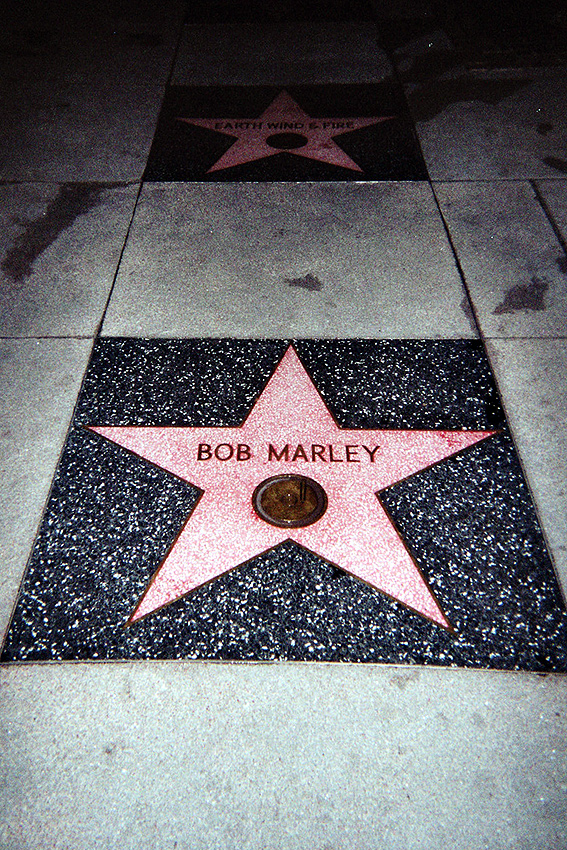
Marley's star on the Hollywood Walk of Fame

A statue was inaugurated next to the national stadium on Arthur Wint Drive in Kingston to commemorate Marley. In 2006, the New York City Department of Education co-named a portion of Church Avenue from Remsen Avenue to East 98th Street in the East Flatbush section of Brooklyn as "Bob Marley Boulevard". In 2008, a statue of Marley was inaugurated in Banatski Sokolac, Serbia.

Internationally, Marley's message continues to reverberate among various indigenous communities. For instance, members of the Native American Hopi and Havasupai tribes revere his work. There are also many tributes to Marley throughout India, including restaurants, hotels, and cultural festivals. Marley evolved into a global symbol which has been endlessly merchandised through a variety of media. Despite this, author Dave Thompson lamented what he perceived to be the pacification of Marley that came with his commercialisation, stating:

Bob Marley ranks among both the most popular and the most misunderstood figures in modern culture [...] That the machine has utterly emasculated Marley is beyond doubt. Gone from the public record is the ghetto kid who dreamed of Che Guevara and the Black Panthers, and pinned their posters up in the Wailers Soul Shack record store; who believed in freedom; and the fighting which it necessitated, and dressed the part on an early album sleeve; whose heroes were James Brown and Muhammad Ali; whose God was Ras Tafari and whose sacrament was marijuana. Instead, the Bob Marley who surveys his kingdom today is smiling benevolence, a shining sun, a waving palm tree, and a string of hits which tumble out of polite radio like candy from a gumball machine. Of course it has assured his immortality. But it has also demeaned him beyond recognition. Bob Marley was worth far more.

Footage of Marley's funeral features in the 1982 film Land of Look Behind by Alan Greenberg. Marley is discussed in the 2007 action thriller I Am Legend, where the protagonist named his daughter after him. Marley's music is also used in the film.

=== Depictions in popular culture ===
Several film adaptations of Marley's life have been made. For instance, a feature-length documentary about his life, Rebel Music, won various awards at the Grammys. With contributions from Rita, The Wailers, and Marley's lovers and children, it also tells much of the story in his own words. In February 2008, director Martin Scorsese announced his intention to produce a documentary movie on Marley. The film was set to be released on 6 February 2010, on what would have been Marley's 65th birthday. However, Scorsese dropped out due to scheduling problems. He was replaced by Jonathan Demme, who dropped out due to creative differences with producer Steve Bing during the beginning of editing. Kevin Macdonald replaced Demme, and the film, Marley, was released on 20 April 2012. In 2011, ex-girlfriend and filmmaker Esther Anderson, along with Gian Godoy, made the documentary Bob Marley: The Making of a Legend, which premiered at the Edinburgh International Film Festival.

In October 2015, Jamaican author Marlon James's novel, A Brief History of Seven Killings, a fictional account of the attempted assassination of Marley, won the 2015 Man Booker Prize at a ceremony in London. In February 2020, Get Up, Stand Up! The Bob Marley Musical was announced by writer Lee Hall and director Dominic Cooke, starring Arinzé Kene as Bob Marley. It was premiered at London's Lyric Theatre on 20 October 2021, after being postponed from its original February premiere due to the COVID-19 pandemic. Bob Marley: One Love, an American biographical drama musical film directed by Reinaldo Marcus Green and starring Kingsley Ben-Adir as Marley, was released in the United States on 14 February 2024.

== Discography ==
=== Studio albums ===
- The Wailing Wailers (1965)
- Soul Rebels (1970)
- Soul Revolution Part II (1971)
- The Best of the Wailers (1971)
- Catch a Fire (1973)
- Burnin' (1973)
- Natty Dread (1974)
- Rastaman Vibration (1976)
- Exodus (1977)
- Kaya (1978)
- Survival (1979)
- Uprising (1980)
- Confrontation (1983)

== See also ==
- Desis bobmarleyi – an underwater spider species named in honour of Marley
- Fabian Marley
- List of peace activists
- Outline of Bob Marley
