= List of Bob Marley and the Wailers band members =

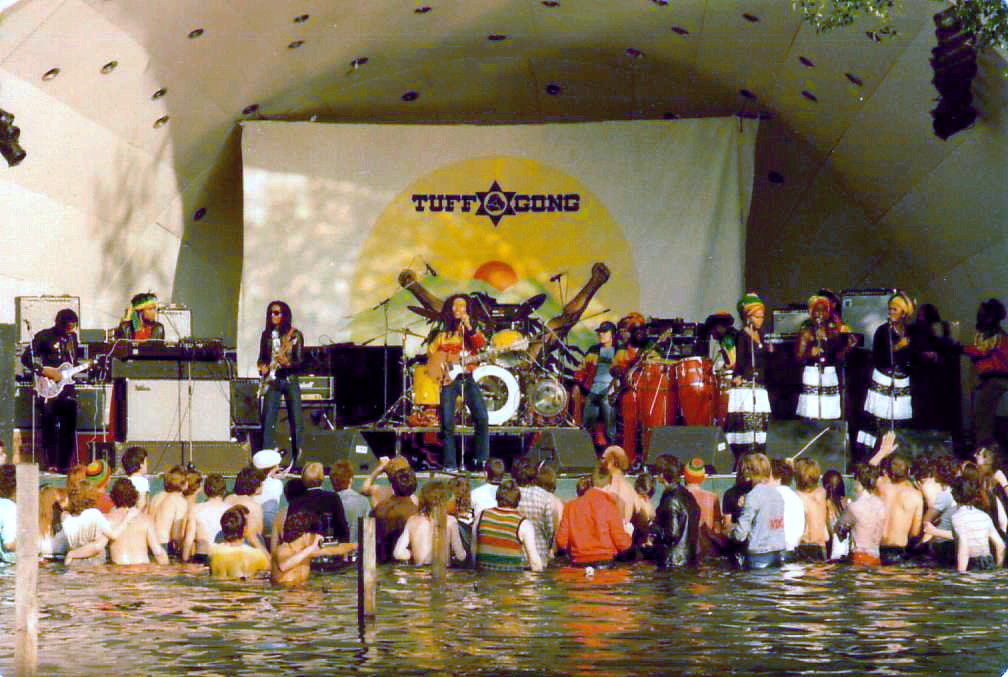
Bob Marley and the Wailers performing at Crystal Palace, London (1980)

Bob Marley and the Wailers were a Jamaican reggae band created by Bob Marley. The band formed when self-taught musician Hubert Winston McIntosh (Peter Tosh) met Neville Livingston (Bunny Wailer), and Robert Nesta Marley (Bob Marley) in 1963 and taught them how to play guitar, keyboards, and percussion. By late 1963 Junior Braithwaite, Beverley Kelso, and Cherry Smith had joined the Wailers. After Peter Tosh and Bunny Wailer left the band in 1974, Bob Marley began touring with new band members. His new backing band included brothers Carlton Barrett and Aston "Family Man" Barrett on drums and bass respectively, Junior Marvin and Al Anderson on lead guitar, Tyrone Downie and Earl "Wya" Lindo on keyboards, and Alvin "Seeco" Patterson on percussion. The "I Threes", consisting of Judy Mowatt, Marcia Griffiths, and Marley's wife, Rita, provided backing vocals.

== Members ==
=== Official members ===
Image	Name	Years active	Instruments	Release contributions
	Bob Marley	1963–1981 (until his death)	vocals; rhythm guitar; acoustic guitar; percussion	all releases
	Peter Tosh	1963–1974 (died 1987)	vocals; lead guitar; piano; organ	all releases from The Wailing Wailers (1965) until Burnin' (1973)
	Bunny Wailer	1963–1974 (died 2021)	vocals; congas; bongos	all releases from The Wailing Wailers (1965) until Burnin' (1973)
	Junior Braithwaite	1963–1964 (died 1999)	vocals	The Wailing Wailers (1965)
	Cherry Smith	1963–1964; 1965–1966 (died 2008)	backing vocals	The Wailing Wailers (1965)
	Beverley Kelso	1964–1965	backing vocals	The Wailing Wailers (1965)
	Constantine Walker	1966	backing vocals	none
	Aston Barrett	1970–1981 (died 2024)	bass guitar; guitar; percussion; keyboards; piano	all releases from Soul Rebels (1970) until Confrontation (1983)
	Carlton Barrett	1970–1981 (died 1987)	drums; percussion	all releases from Soul Rebels (1970) until Confrontation (1983)
	Earl Lindo	1973; 1978–1981 (died 2017)	keyboards; clavinet; organ; percussion; backing vocals	Burnin' (1973); Survival (1979); Uprising (1980); Confrontation (1983)
	Tyrone Downie	1974–1981 (died 2022)	organ; keyboards; bass guitar; percussion; backing vocals	Catch a Fire (1973); all releases from Rastaman Vibration (1976) until Confrontation (1983)
	Rita Marley	1974–1981	backing vocals	Catch a Fire (1973); all releases from Natty Dread (1974) until Confrontation (1983)
	Marcia Griffiths	1974–1981	backing vocals	Catch a Fire (1973); all releases from Natty Dread (1974) until Confrontation (1983)
	Judy Mowatt	1974–1981	backing vocals	all releases from Natty Dread (1974) until Confrontation (1983)
	Al Anderson	1974–1975; 1978–1981	lead and rhythm guitar	Natty Dread (1974); Rastaman Vibration (1976); Survival (1979); Uprising (1980)
	Alvin "Seeco" Patterson	1975–1981 (died 2021)	percussion	Catch a Fire (1973); Burnin' (1973); Rastaman Vibration (1976); Exodus (1977); Kaya (1978); Uprising (1980); Confrontation (1983)
	Earl "Chinna" Smith	1975–1976	lead and rhythm guitar; percussion	Rastaman Vibration (1976)
	Donald Kinsey	1975–1976 (died 2024)	lead guitar; backing vocals	Rastaman Vibration (1976)
	Junior Marvin	1977–1981	lead guitar; backing vocals	all releases from Exodus (1977) until Confrontation (1983)

=== Touring members ===
Image	Name	Years active	Instruments	Release contributions
	Joe Higgs	1973	vocals; percussion	none
	Lee Jaffe	1974–1975	harmonica	none

=== Studio musicians ===
Image	Name	Years active	Instruments	Release contributions
Jackie Mittoo	1963-1967	keys		
Brian Atkinson	1965-1967	bass		
Clinton Joe Isaacs	1966-1967	drums		
Hugh Malcolm	1967–1972	drums; percussion		
	Alva "Reggie" Lewis		guitar	Soul Rebels (1970); Soul Revolution (1971)
	Glen Adams		keyboards	Soul Rebels (1970); Soul Revolution (1971)
	Robbie Shakespeare		bass guitar	Catch a Fire (1973)
	Wayne Perkins		lead guitar	Catch a Fire (1973)
	John "Rabbit" Bundrick		synthesizer; clavinet; organ	Catch a Fire (1973)
	Chris Karen		percussion	Catch a Fire (1973)
	Winston Wright		percussion	Catch a Fire (1973)
	Bernard "Touter" Harvey		piano; organ	Natty Dread (1974)
	Nathaniel Ian Wynter aka Natty Wailer		keyboards	Rastaman Vibration (1976); Exodus (1977)
	Vin Gordon		saxophone	Kaya (1978)
	Glen Da Costa		trumpet; saxophone	Kaya (1978); Confrontation (1983)
	David Madden		trumpet	Kaya (1978); Confrontation (1983)
	Val Douglas		bass	Survival (1979)
	Mikey "Boo" Richards		drums	Survival (1979)
	Carlton "Santa" Davis		drums	Confrontation (1983)
	Devon Evans		percussion	Confrontation (1983)
	Ronald "Nambo" Robinson		trombone	Confrontation (1983)

== Line-ups ==
Period	Members	Releases
c. 1964	Bob Marley – vocals; Peter Tosh – vocals; Bunny Wailer – vocals; Junior Braithwaite – vocals; Beverley Kelso – backing vocals	
c. 1965	Bob Marley – vocals; Peter Tosh – vocals; Bunny Wailer – vocals; Beverley Kelso – backing vocals; Cherry Smith – backing vocals	
c. 1966	Peter Tosh – vocals; Bunny Wailer – vocals; Constantine Walker – backing vocals; Rita Marley – backing vocals	
1966–1970	Bob Marley – vocals; Peter Tosh – vocals; Bunny Wailer – vocals; Rita Marley – backing vocals	
1970–1972	Bob Marley – vocals, guitar; Peter Tosh – vocals, guitar; Bunny Wailer – vocals, percussion; Aston Barrett – bass guitar; Carlton Barrett – drums	
1973	Bob Marley – vocals, guitar; Peter Tosh – vocals, guitar; Bunny Wailer – vocals, percussion; Earl Lindo – keyboards; Aston Barrett – bass guitar; Carlton Barrett – drums	
1974	Bob Marley – vocals, guitar; Peter Tosh – vocals, guitar; Bunny Wailer – vocals, percussion; Tyrone Downie – keyboards; Aston Barrett – bass guitar; Carlton Barrett – drums	
1974–1975	Bob Marley – vocals, guitar; Rita Marley – backing vocals; Judy Mowatt – backing vocals; Marcia Griffiths – backing vocals; Al Anderson – lead guitar; Tyrone Downie – keyboards; Aston Barrett – bass guitar; Carlton Barrett – drums; Alvin "Seeco" Patterson – percussion	
1975–1976	Bob Marley – vocals, guitar; Rita Marley – backing vocals; Judy Mowatt – backing vocals; Marcia Griffiths – backing vocals; Earl "Chinna" Smith – guitar; Donald Kinsey – lead guitar; Tyrone Downie – keyboards; Aston Barrett – bass guitar; Carlton Barrett – drums; Alvin "Seeco" Patterson – percussion	
1977	Bob Marley – vocals, guitar; Rita Marley – backing vocals; Judy Mowatt – backing vocals; Marcia Griffiths – backing vocals; Junior Marvin – guitar; Tyrone Downie – keyboards; Aston Barrett – bass guitar; Carlton Barrett – drums; Alvin "Seeco" Patterson – percussion	
1978–1981	Bob Marley – vocals, guitar; Rita Marley – backing vocals; Judy Mowatt – backing vocals; Marcia Griffiths – backing vocals; Junior Marvin – guitar; Al Anderson – guitar; Tyrone Downie – keyboards; Earl Lindo – keyboards; Aston Barrett – bass guitar; Carlton Barrett – drums; Alvin "Seeco" Patterson – percussion	
