= Gold (Bob Marley and the Wailers album) =

2005 greatest hits album by Bob Marley and the Wailers

Greatest hits album by Bob Marley and the Wailers
- Released: 11 January 2005
- Genre: Reggae
- Label: Island

Bob Marley and the Wailers chronology
| Live at the Roxy (2003) | Gold (2005) | Africa Unite (2005) |

Professional ratings
Review scores
| Source | Rating |
|---|---|
| AllMusic | 4/5 stars |

Gold is a two-disc compilation album by Bob Marley and the Wailers that was released on the Island Records label in 2005. The compilation is intended to be a career-spanning retrospective, and no fewer than two songs are selected from each of Bob Marley and the Wailers' albums with the company. Songs range from his first album for the label, Catch a Fire, and span all the way through to the last album Marley would live to see released in his lifetime, Uprising, concluding with the posthumous releases "Iron Lion Zion", and tracks from Confrontation.

This Gold compilation is not to be confused with another compilation Universal released later the same year under the Gold line, consisting of Marley's early pre-fame material with the Wailers dating from 1967 to 1972.

== Track listing ==
=== Disc one ===
1. "Stir It Up"
2. "Slave Driver"
3. "Concrete Jungle"
4. "Get Up, Stand Up"
5. "I Shot the Sheriff"
6. "Burnin' and Lootin'"
7. "Lively Up Yourself"
8. "Rebel Music (3 O'Clock Roadblock)"
9. "Trenchtown Rock" (Live)
10. "No Woman, No Cry" (Live)
11. "Jah Live"
12. "Positive Vibration"
13. "Roots, Rock, Reggae"
14. "Crazy Baldhead"
15. "Natural Mystic"
16. "Exodus"
17. "Jamming'"

=== Disc two ===
1. "One Love / People Get Ready"
2. "Waiting in Vain"
3. "Punky Reggae Party"
4. "Is This Love"
5. "Sun Is Shining"
6. "Satisfy My Soul"
7. "Kinky Reggae" (Live)
8. "Medley: War / No More Trouble" (Live)
9. "So Much Trouble in the World"
10. "Africa Unite"
11. "One Drop"
12. "Could You Be Loved"
13. "Coming in from the Cold"
14. "Redemption Song"
15. "Buffalo Soldier"
16. "Rastaman Live Up!"
17. "Iron Lion Zion"
