= Live at the Roxy (Bob Marley and the Wailers album) =

Live album by the Wailers
- Released: 24 June 2003
- Recorded: 26 May 1976
- Venues: The Roxy, West Hollywood, California
- Genre: Reggae
- Length: 86:08
- Label: Tuff Gong / Island

The Wailers chronology
One Love (2001)	Live at the Roxy (2003)	Gold (2005)

Professional ratings
Review scores
Source	Rating
AllMusic	link

Live at the Roxy is a two-disc live album by the Wailers, released in 2003. The album contains a complete concert, recorded on 26 May 1976 at The Roxy in West Hollywood California, during the Rastaman Vibration tour.

This concert was originally broadcast live on the KMET radio station in Los Angeles. Because of the radio simulcast, this concert became widely bootlegged beginning in 1976. In 2002 the Marley family released the concert on the reissued Rastaman Vibration: Deluxe Edition, with a previously unreleased single "Smile Jamaica".

On 24 June 2003 Tuff Gong released the complete concert, including the previously unreleased twenty-eight-minute encore, containing "Positive Vibration" and medley "Get Up, Stand Up / No More Trouble / War".

The concert was MC'd by Tony Garnett, the band's one-time road manager.

== Track listing ==
Disc 1
No.	Title	Writer(s)	Length
1.	"introduction (Tony Garnett, MC at the Roxy, 1976-05-26)"	Bob Marley	0:38
2.	"Trenchtown Rock"	Bob Marley, Peter Tosh, Neville Livingstone	4:55
3.	"Burnin' and Lootin'"	Bob Marley, Peter Tosh, Neville Livingstone	4:53
4.	"Them Belly Full (but We Hungry)"	Leon Cogill, Carlton "Carly" Barrett, Marley, Tosh, Livingstone	4:12
5.	"Rebel Music (3 o'clock Road Block)"	Aston Barrett, Hugh Peart, Marley, Tosh, Livingstone	5:54
6.	"I Shot the Sheriff"	Bob Marley, Peter Tosh, Neville Livingstone	6:27
7.	"Want More"	Aston Barrett	6:55
8.	"No Woman, No Cry"	Vincent Ford, Bob Marley, Peter Tosh, Neville Livingstone	5:18
9.	"Lively Up Yourself"	Bob Marley, Peter Tosh, Neville Livingstone	5:44
10.	"Roots, Rock, Reggae"	Vincent Ford	5:32
11.	"Rat Race"	Rita Marley	7:46

Disc 2
No.	Title	Writer(s)	Length
1.	"Positive Vibration"	Vincent Ford	3:56
2.	"Get Up, Stand Up / No More Trouble / War"	Bob Marley, Peter Tosh, Neville Livingstone/ Bob Marley / Allan Cole, Carlton "Carly" Barrett	23:58

== Musicians ==
- Bob Marley – lead vocals, rhythm guitar
- I Threes (Rita Marley, Judy Mowatt, Marcia Griffiths) – background vocals
- Aston Barrett "Family Man" – bass guitar
- Carlton Barrett "Carly" – drums
- Earl "Chinna" Smith, Donald Kinsey – guitar
- Earl Lindo "Wire", Tyrone Downie – keyboards
- Alvin Patterson "Seeco" – percussion
