= One drop =

One drop may refer to:

- One Drop Foundation, a non-profit organization that advocates for equal access to water
- Big One for One Drop, a poker tournament featuring the largest buy-in events
- One drop rhythm, a rhythmic pattern used in reggae music and related styles
- One-drop rule, a law in the antebellum South that stated that a person with any African ancestry was considered black

== Songs ==
- "One Drop" (Bob Marley & The Wailers song)
- "One Drop" (KAT-TUN song)
- "One Drop", a 2012 single by Public Image Ltd.
- "One Drop", a song by Plumb on Need You Now (Plumb album)
