= Uprising (Bob Marley and the Wailers album) =

Studio album by Bob Marley and the Wailers
- Released: 10 June 1980
- Recorded: January–April 1980
- Studios: Tuff Gong Studios, Kingston, Jamaica
- Genre: Reggae
- Length: 35:53
- Label: Tuff Gong/Island
- Producers: Chris Blackwell; Bob Marley

Bob Marley and the Wailers chronology
Survival (1979)	Uprising (1980)	Chances Are (1981)

Singles from Uprising
- 1. "Could You Be Loved" Released: 16 May 1980; 2. "Redemption Song" Released: 7 October 1980

Professional ratings
Review scores
Source	Rating
AllMusic	4.5/5 stars
Rolling Stone	4.5/5 stars
Smash Hits	6/10

"Could You Be Loved"
"Could You Be Loved" audio sample

Uprising is the twelfth studio album by Bob Marley and the Wailers and the final studio album released during Marley's lifetime. Released on 10 June 1980, the album is one of Marley's most directly religious, with nearly every song referencing his religious beliefs, culminating in the acoustic recording of "Redemption Song".

Uprising peaked at number 41 on the US Billboard Black Albums chart, and number 45 on the Pop Albums chart. "Could You Be Loved" was number six and number 56 respectively on the Club Play Singles and Black Singles charts. The album fared better in the UK where it was a top ten hit along with the single "Could You Be Loved" which reached number five in the UK singles charts.

== Track listing ==
=== Original album (1980) ===
All tracks are written by Bob Marley.

Side one
No.	Title	Length
1.	"Coming in from the Cold"	4:30
2.	"Real Situation"	3:08
3.	"Bad Card"	2:50
4.	"We and Dem"	3:12
5.	"Work"	3:41

Side two
No.	Title	Length
6.	"Zion Train"	3:36
7.	"Pimper's Paradise"	3:27
8.	"Could You Be Loved"	3:57
9.	"Forever Loving Jah"	3:52
10.	"Redemption Song"	3:47

=== The Definitive Remastered edition (2001) ===
All tracks are written by Bob Marley.

Current CD version
No.	Title	Length
1.	"Coming in from the Cold"	4:30
2.	"Real Situation"	3:08
3.	"Bad Card"	2:50
4.	"We and Dem"	3:12
5.	"Work"	3:41
6.	"Zion Train"	3:36
7.	"Pimper's Paradise"	3:27
8.	"Could You Be Loved"	3:57
9.	"Forever Loving Jah"	3:52
10.	"Redemption Song"	3:47
11.	"Redemption Song" (band version)	4:47
12.	"Could You Be Loved" (12-inch version)	5:24

== Personnel ==
=== Musicians ===
- Bob Marley – lead vocal, rhythm guitar, acoustic guitar
- Aston "Family Man" Barrett – bass, piano, guitar, percussion
- Carlton Barrett – drums, percussion
- Carlton "Santa" Davis – drums
- Tyrone Downie – keyboards, backing vocal
- Alvin Patterson – percussion
- Junior Marvin – lead guitar, backing vocal
- Earl Lindo – keyboards
- Al Anderson – lead guitar
- I Threes (Rita Marley, Marcia Griffiths and Judy Mowatt) – backing vocals

=== Production ===
- Bob Marley and the Wailers – Producers
- Chris Blackwell – Executive producer
- Errol Brown – engineer, mixing engineer
- the Wailers and Michael Rees – mixed
- Chiao Ng – assistant engineer
- Ted Jensen – mastering engineer
- Neville Garrick – art direction
- Adrian Boot – photo

== Charts ==
=== Weekly charts ===
Chart performance for Uprising
Chart (1980)	Peak position
Australian Albums (Kent Music Report)	46
Austrian Albums Chart	6
Norwegian Albums Chart	6
New Zealand Albums Chart	1
Swedish Albums Chart	3
UK Albums Chart	6
US Top LPs & Tape (Billboard)	45
US Top Soul LPs (Billboard)	41

=== Year-end charts ===
Annual chart rankings for Uprising
Chart (1980)	Position
German Albums (Offizielle Top 100)	22
Italian Albums (Musica e dischi)	6
New Zealand Albums (RMNZ)	25
Chart (1981)	Position
German Albums (Offizielle Top 100)	23

== Certifications ==
Certifications for Uprising
Region	Certification	Certified units/sales
France (SNEP)	2× Platinum	600,000^{*}
Germany (BVMI)	Gold	250,000^{^}
Italy	—	200,000
Italy (FIMI) sales since 2009	Gold	25,000^{‡}
New Zealand (RMNZ)	2× Platinum	30,000^{‡}
Spain (Promusicae)	Gold	50,000^{^}
United Kingdom (BPI)	Gold	100,000^{‡}
United States (RIAA)	Gold	500,000^{^}
^{*} Sales figures based on certification alone.^{^} Shipments figures based on certification alone.^{‡} Sales+streaming figures based on certification alone.
