= The Wailing Wailers =

1965 studio album by the Wailers

Studio album by the Wailing Wailers
- Released: 1965
- Recorded: 1964–1965
- Studios: Jamaica Recording, Brentford Road, Kingston, Jamaica
- Genre: Ska
- Length: 36:01
- Label: Studio One S1001
- Producer: Clement Dodd

The Wailing Wailers chronology
The Wailing Wailers (1965)	Soul Rebels (1970)

1971 reissue cover

The Wailing Wailers is the 1965 eponymous debut studio album by the Wailers, later known as Bob Marley and the Wailers. Released on the Studio One label, the album is a compilation of various recordings made between 1964 and 1965 by Neville "Bunny" Livingston (Bunny Wailer), Robert Nesta Marley (Bob Marley) and Peter McIntosh (Peter Tosh). It compiles what Clement Coxsone Dodd considered the best Wailers recordings from this period. They were accompanied by the Studio One backing band, the Soul Brothers.

It is not a studio album in the conventional sense but was the first full-length LP released of the band's work. The album has remained in print since its release, but after the first release (which has a different cover) each release of the album was newly overdubbed to fit with musical trends of the time. The first CD release with the original track listing was in May 2016.

== Music ==
The songs "Simmer Down" and "Rude Boy", recorded in 1964 and 1965, were youth anthems which established the Wailers as the leaders of the new movement.

== Influence ==
The band photo from the front cover of the 1971 re-issue (also used on various subsequent re-issues), with Bunny Wailer standing on the left, Bob Marley standing in the middle and Peter Tosh standing on the right, was also an inspiration for Walt Jabsco, the logo for 2 Tone Records; the drawing was created by Jerry Dammers and Horace Panter and is based on Peter Tosh.

== Track listing ==
=== Original LP ===
All songs written by Bob Marley, except where noted.

Side one

1. "(I'm Gonna) Put It On" (Marley, Clement Coxsone Dodd) – 3:06
2. "I Need You" (1964 version) – 2:48
3. "Lonesome Feeling" (Marley, Bunny Livingston, Peter Tosh) – 2:50
4. "What's New Pussycat?" (Burt Bacharach, Hal David) – 3:02
5. "One Love" – 3:20
6. "When the Well Runs Dry" (William Bell) – 2:35

Side two

1. "Ten Commandments of Love" (The Moonglows) – 4:16
2. "Rude Boy" – 2:20
3. "It Hurts to Be Alone" (Junior Braithwaite) – 2:42
4. "Love and Affection" – 2:42
5. "I'm Still Waiting" – 3:31
6. "Simmer Down" (Marley, Dodd) – 2:49

=== CD Reissue ===
1996 Studio One CD reissue interspersed with bonus tracks. Overdubbed to fit with musical trends of the time.

All songs written by Bob Marley and produced by Clement Coxsone Dodd, except where noted.

Track listing

1. "(I'm Gonna) Put It On" (Marley, Dodd) – 3:07
2. "Duppy Conqueror" – 3:44*†
3. "I Need You" – 3:07
4. "No Sympathy" – 2:15*†
5. "Lonesome Feeling" (Marley, Bunny Livingston, Peter Tosh) – 2:53
6. "Ska Jerk" – 2:56*
7. "When the Well Runs Dry" (William Bell) – 2:55
8. "Soul Rebel" – 3:19*†
9. "Ten Commandments of Love" (The Moonglows) – 4:07
10. "Rude Boy" – 2:06
11. "400 Years" – 2:33*†
12. "It Hurts to Be Alone" (Junior Braithwaite) – 2:45
13. "Kaya" – 2:43*†
14. "Love and Affection" – 2:39
15. "Sun Is Shining" – 2:14*†
16. "I'm Still Waiting" – 3:33
17. "Simmer Down" (Marley, Dodd) – 2:46
18. "How Many Time" – 2:53*
19. "Lively Up Yourself" – 2:49*‡
20. "Guajira Ska" – 2:30*

* Additional track not included in previous issues.
† Produced by Lee "Scratch" Perry
‡ Produced by Bob Marley (uncredited)

Two tracks from previous releases were excluded:

1. "What's New Pussycat?"
2. "One Love"
