= Iron Lion Zion =

1992 single by Bob Marley

Single by Bob Marley

from the album Songs of Freedom
- B-side: "Smile Jamaica"
- Released: 7 September 1992
- Recorded: April 1973 or 1974
- Genre: Reggae
- Length: 3:21
- Label: Tuff Gong; Island
- Songwriter: Bob Marley
- Producers: Errol Brown; Ingmar Kiang; Bob Marley; The Wailers; Trevor Wyatt

Bob Marley singles chronology
"One Love/People Get Ready" (1984)	"Iron Lion Zion" (1992)	"Why Should I" (1992)

"Iron Lion Zion" is a song written and recorded in April 1973 or 1974 by Jamaican singer and songwriter Bob Marley, making it a very early example of the 'stepper' style. It was first released posthumously on 7 September 1992 by Tuff Gong and Island Records on the Songs of Freedom box set (1992), reaching number five in the UK Singles Chart. The single also peaked within the top 10 in Belgium, Finland, France, Ireland, the Netherlands, Spain, Sweden, and Switzerland. On the Eurochart Hot 100, "Iron Lion Zion" peaked at number eight. Outside Europe, it reached number two in New Zealand, number 71 in Australia and number 11 on the US Billboard Modern Rock Tracks chart. A remixed version was released as a single and later included in 1995 on Natural Mystic: The Legend Lives On.

== Lyrics ==
The song's lyrics are directly related to Rastafarian beliefs. The "lion" refers to the Lion of Judah which appeared on the old royal Ethiopian flag and represents Haile Selassie - the former Ethiopian emperor whom Rastafarians regard as their Messiah.

== Critical reception ==
Larry Flick from Billboard magazine wrote, "Rockers' reggae with pop swing and dance sizzle, this propulsive, previously unreleased jewel from the new Songs of Freedom boxed set features a wonderfully exultant vocal from Marley, plus the terrific horn of Courtney Pine. A smash in the U.K., it deserves to explode here." Randy Clark of Cash Box felt the cut "is both club- and radio-friendly". Melody Maker praised the song, writing, "...I must say that Marley's 'Iron Lion Zion' is a work of god-like genius; every second as noble as the title suggests."

A reviewer from Music & Media said, "Of course it's a little bit reworked in the studios with additional musicians such as the jazz saxophonist Courtney Pine and female vocal trio I Threes, featuring Marley's widow Rita. Bound to be a classic like the posthumously released 'Buffalo Soldier' in 1983." Alan Jones from Music Week named it Pick of the Week and a "Marley masterpiece", and declared it as "a hugely commercial, lightly dubbed and joyous reminder of his talent". New Musical Express wrote, "Cleverly completed and a probable hit, still carrying all the broad-sweep magnitude of his vision." The reviewer added, "I like it. It's top. Will that do?" Another NME editor, Gavin Martin, complimented it as a "horn bolstered stomp". J.D. Considine for Rolling Stone viewed it as "fiery". Eric Snider from the Tampa Bay Times described it as "infectious".

== Track listings ==
- 7" single
1. "Iron Lion Zion" – 3:21
2. "Smile Jamaica" (by Bob Marley & the Wailers) – 3:13
- CD maxi
1. "Iron Lion Zion" (7" mix) – 3:21
2. "Smile Jamaica" (by Bob Marley & the Wailers) – 3:12
3. "Three Little Birds" (alternative mix) (by Bob Marley & the Wailers) – 2:55
4. "Iron Lion Zion" (12" mix) – 7:02

== Charts ==
=== Weekly charts ===
Chart (1992–1993)	Peak position
Australia (ARIA)	71
Austria (Ö3 Austria Top 40)	11
Belgium (Ultratop 50 Flanders)	5
Europe (Eurochart Hot 100)	8
Europe (European Dance Radio)	9
Europe (European Hit Radio)	1
Finland (IFPI)	10
France (SNEP)	3
Germany (GfK)	17
Ireland (IRMA)	5
Israel (Israeli Singles Chart)	14
Netherlands (Dutch Top 40)	4
Netherlands (Single Top 100)	5
New Zealand (Recorded Music NZ)	2
Spain (AFYVE)	9
Sweden (Sverigetopplistan)	2
Switzerland (Schweizer Hitparade)	9
UK Singles (Official Charts)	5
UK Airplay (Music Week)	1
UK Dance (Music Week)	8
US Modern Rock Tracks (Billboard)	11

=== Year-end charts ===
Chart (1992)	Position
Belgium (Ultratop 50 Flanders)	48
Europe (Eurochart Hot 100)	65
Europe (European Hit Radio)	28
Netherlands (Dutch Top 40)	36
Netherlands (Single Top 100)	61
Sweden (Topplistan)	23
UK Singles (OCC)	68
UK Airplay (Music Week)	30

Chart (1993)	Position
Europe (Eurochart Hot 100)	91

== Certifications ==
Region	Certification	Certified units/sales
New Zealand (RMNZ)	Gold	5,000^{*}
^{*} Sales figures based on certification alone.

== Release history ==
Region	Date	Format(s)	Label(s)	Ref.
United Kingdom	7 September 1992	7-inch vinyl; 12-inch vinyl; CD; cassette	Tuff Gong; Island	
Australia	21 September 1992	CD; cassette	Tuff Gong; Island	
Japan	6 November 1992	CD	Tuff Gong; Island	
