= Confrontation (Bob Marley and the Wailers album) =

Studio album by Bob Marley and the Wailers
- Released: 23 May 1983
- Recorded: ca. 1977-80, April–May 1982
- Studios: Tuff Gong Studios, Kingston, Jamaica
- Genre: Reggae
- Length: 37:47
- Label: Tuff Gong/Island
- Producers: Bob Marley & the Wailers and Errol Brown

Bob Marley and the Wailers chronology
Chances Are (1981)	Confrontation (1983)	Legend (1984)

Singles from Confrontation
- 1. "Buffalo Soldier" Released: 1983

Professional ratings
Review scores
Source	Rating
AllMusic	3/5 stars
Robert Christgau	B+
The Encyclopedia of Popular Music	3/5 stars
Rolling Stone	3/5 stars
Select	2/5 medals

Confrontation is the thirteenth and final studio album by Bob Marley & the Wailers and the only one to be released posthumously in May 1983, two years after Marley's death. The songs were compiled from unreleased material and singles recorded during Marley's lifetime. Many of the tracks were built up from demos, most notably "Jump Nyabinghi" where vocals from the I-Threes were added, which were not there when Marley released the song as a dubplate in 1979. In addition the harmony vocals on "Blackman Redemption" and "Rastaman Live Up" are performed by the I-Threes in order to give the album a consistent sound – on the original single versions they are performed by the Meditations. The most famous track on the album is "Buffalo Soldier".

The album cover depicts Bob Marley taking the role as the military Saint George slaying the dragon which symbolizes Babylon. Perhaps not coincidentally, this motif was also displayed on the reverse of the imperial standard of Rastafari icon Haile Selassie of Ethiopia, though the direct model for the album art is a British recruitment poster from World War I. Inside the album sleeve is an artist's depiction of the Battle of Adowa where Ethiopian forces defeated Italy in 1896.

== Track listing ==
=== Original album (1983) ===
All tracks are written by Bob Marley, except where stated.

Side one
No.	Title	Writer(s)	Length
1.	"Chant Down Babylon"		2:36
2.	"Buffalo Soldier"	Bob Marley, N.G. Williams	4:17
3.	"Jump Nyabinghi"		3:44
4.	"Mix Up, Mix Up"		5:02
5.	"Give Thanks and Praises"		3:16

Side two
No.	Title	Writer(s)	Length
6.	"Blackman Redemption"		3:33
7.	"Trench Town"		3:12
8.	"Stiff Necked Fools"		3:25
9.	"I Know"		3:21
10.	"Rastaman Live Up!"	Bob Marley, Lee "Scratch" Perry	5:26

=== The Definitive Remastered edition (2001) ===
All tracks are written by Bob Marley, except where stated.

Side one
No.	Title	Writer(s)	Length
1.	"Chant Down Babylon"		2:36
2.	"Buffalo Soldier"	Bob Marley, N.G. Williams	4:17
3.	"Jump Nyabinghi"		3:44
4.	"Mix Up, Mix Up"		5:02
5.	"Give Thanks & Praises"		3:16
6.	"Blackman Redemption"		3:33
7.	"Trench Town"		3:12
8.	"Stiff Necked Fools"		3:25
9.	"I Know"		3:21
10.	"Rastaman Live Up!"	Bob Marley, Lee "Scratch" Perry	5:26
11.	"Buffalo Soldier" (12-inch mix)		7:37

"Stiff Necked Fools"
"Stiff Necked Fools" audio sample

== Personnel ==
- Bob Marley – lead vocals, rhythm guitar
- Aston Barrett – bass, guitar, percussion
- Carlton Barrett – drums, akete
- Tyrone Downie – keyboards, background vocal
- Junior Marvin – guitar, backing vocals
- Earl Lindo – keyboards
- Alvin Patterson – percussion
- I Threes (Rita Marley, Marcia Griffiths and Judy Mowatt) – backing vocals
- Glen DaCosta – tenor saxophone
- David Madden – trumpet
- Ronald "Nambo" Robinson – trombone
- Devon Evans – percussion
- Carlton "Santa" Davis– drums (on "Chant Down Babylon")

Technical

- Neville Garrick – art direction and graphics
- Errol Brown – recording and mixing engineer
- Michaell Reid – assistant engineer
- Errol Brown, Chris Blackwell and Aston Barrett – mixers
- Bob Marley & The Wailers and Errol Brown – producers
- Azdean Marley – executive producer
- Ted Jensen at Sterling Sound, NYC – mastering

== Charts ==
Chart performance for Confrontation
Chart (1983)	Peak position
Australian Albums (Kent Music Report)	11
Austrian Albums (Ö3 Austria)	18
Dutch Albums (Album Top 100)	26
French Albums (SNEP)	199
German Albums (Offizielle Top 100)	31
New Zealand Albums (RMNZ)	6
Norwegian Albums (VG-lista)	12
Swedish Albums (Sverigetopplistan)	16
UK Albums (Official Charts)	5
US Billboard 200	55
US Top R&B/Hip-Hop Albums (Billboard)	31

== Certifications ==
Certifications for Confrontation
Region	Certification	Certified units/sales
New Zealand (RMNZ)	Gold	7,500^{^}
United States (RIAA)	Gold	500,000^{^}
^{^} Shipments figures based on certification alone.
