= Jah Live =

Single by Bob Marley & the Wailers
- B-side: "Concrete"
- Released: January 1976
- Recorded: Autumn 1975
- Studio: Harry J (Kingston, Jamaica)
- Genre: Reggae
- Label: Tuff Gong/Island
- Songwriters: Bob Marley, Lee Perry
- Producers: Bob Marley, Lee Perry

Bob Marley & the Wailers singles chronology
"Rat Race" (1975)	"Jah Live" (1976)	"Johnny Was" (1976)

"Jah Live" is a song by Bob Marley & the Wailers, released as a single in 1975. The song was recorded and released within days following the announcement of the death of Haile Selassie I of Ethiopia whom Rastafarians see as the reincarnation of God, whom they call Jah. The song was written as a message to the world that Haile Selassie I had not died as the Ethiopian government of the time and (according to the song) detractors of the Rastafarian religion claimed. When the song was released, Selassie was claimed dead by the Ethiopian authorities but there was no body. Marley was prescient in response to the news that no body had been found saying, "Yuh cyant kill God".

In the song, Marley directly confronts those who doubt the Rastafari movement because of the apparent death of Selassie I:

Fools say in their hearts
Rasta your God is dead
But I and I know Jah-Jah!
Dread: it shall be dreader dread

Though originally recorded as a single, the song has since been released on the 1992 box set Songs of Freedom, as a bonus track on the 2001 re-release of Marley's 1976 album Rastaman Vibration and in 2002 on its "deluxe edition", and on the compilations One Love: The Very Best of Bob Marley & The Wailers (2001) and Gold (2005).

A dub version of the song, titled "Concrete", was released on the single's B-side. It has since been released on the deluxe edition of Rastaman Vibration in 2002. The song is featured in the closing credits of Countryman, the legendary rasta movie.
