= Chances Are (album) =

Compilation album / Studio album by Bob Marley & the Wailers
- Released: October 1981
- Recorded: 1968–1972
- Genre: Reggae
- Length: 32:03
- Labels: WEA, Cotillion (U.S.)
- Producers: Bob Marley, Larry Fallon, Danny Sims

Bob Marley & the Wailers chronology
Uprising (1980)	Chances Are (1981)	Confrontation (1983)

Professional ratings
Review scores
Source	Rating
Rolling Stone	(1/5)

Chances Are is a compilation album by Bob Marley released in 1981 by WEA International throughout the world, and through the Cotillion imprint of Atlantic Records in the U.S.

== Background ==
Commissioned by Danny Sims (co-founder and owner of JAD Records) and issued after Marley's death in May 1981, Chances Are was a collection of previously unreleased recordings from 1968 to 1972 that were produced by JAD during Marley's time living in the U.S. and otherwise working with JAD back and forth from Jamaica to the States. The selected tracks on this collection were overdubbed, remixed, and in many cases, extended beyond their original duration specially for this album.

The majority of songs on this album were re-released on the Black Progress compilation album in 1997 (also released by JAD through the former KOCH International, prior to their original versions being issued on the Complete Wailers series.) The only song not reissued in this version is Mellow Mood, although there was a limited CD pressing of Chances Are printed in the early nineties.

== Track listing ==
1. "Reggae on Broadway" (5:20)
2. "Gonna Get You" (3:16)
3. "Chances Are" (5:03)
4. "Soul Rebel" (3:58)
5. "Dance Do the Reggae" (4:38)
6. "Mellow Mood" (3:22)
7. "Stay with Me" (3:00)
8. "I'm Hurting Inside" (3:40)

== Song footnotes ==
- "Reggae On Broadway" — a 1972 song which fused reggae with soul and rock music in an attempt to bring Marley mainstream radio attention (particularly in the U.S.), was a minor hit in the UK, where it was issued on CBS Records. This tune was remixed and extended for Chances Are and was also released as a 12" single.
- "Gonna Get You" — one of two written by Coasters touring member Jimmy Norman and his partner Al Pyfrom.
- "Chances Are" — this ballad was overdubbed with organ lines and extended. Before this version, "Chances Are", along with other JAD recordings whose original issues were long out-of-print and never commercially released again, were otherwise available on an unauthorized compilation in 1978 issued by a small label, Magnum Records, that was eventually made available through many other small, independent record companies throughout the next few years with different artwork and different titles. The song was covered by The Breeders on Fate to Fatal (2009), and by Canadian singer-songwriter Dan Mangan on his 2020 covers album Thief.
- "Soul Rebel" — previously recorded under Lee "Scratch" Perry.
- "Dance Do The Reggae" — this recording, which was also released through CBS, was extended by one verse and chorus and slightly overdubbed.
- "Mellow Mood" — this remake of his own rocksteady hit from the Wail 'N' Soul 'M days that was also featured on the 1978 Magnum compilation was remixed and overlaid with extra percussion.
- "Stay With Me" — a rare venture into the pop sound of the day, this tune, which was also written by Jimmy Norman and Al Pyfrom, was remixed with extra drums and extended by repetition of the bridge.
- "I'm Hurting Inside"* — also a cover of a Wailers rocksteady recording from the Wail 'N' Soul 'M period, this tune was remixed for Chances Are. An alternate version of the original recording was issued on the 1992 Songs Of Freedom box set.
