= Simmer Down =

1963 single by The Wailers

Single by The Wailers
- B-side: "I Don't Need Your Love"
- Released: December 1963
- Recorded: December 1963
- Studio: Studio One, Kingston, Jamaica
- Genre: Ska
- Length: 2:50
- Label: Coxsone
- Songwriter: Bob Marley
- Producer: Clement "Coxsone" Dodd

Audio sample
- file; help

"Simmer Down" is the first single released by the Wailers, accompanied by the ska supergroup the Skatalites and produced by Clement "Coxsone" Dodd in 1963. It was the number one hit in Jamaica in February 1964.

The song was directed to the "rude boys" of the ghettos of Jamaica at the time, sending them a message to cool down or "simmer down" with all the violence and crime going on in Kingston. The subject matter of "Simmer Down" made the Wailers stand out amongst their contemporaries. The ska sound of the single is a marked contrast to the slower reggae that the Wailers would later become internationally known for. The Wailers at this time contained Bob Marley, Bunny Wailer, Peter Tosh, Junior Braithwaite, Cherry Smith, and Beverley Kelso. It was Bob Marley's first hit and his career as a songwriter and performer took off from there.

In spite of "Simmer Down"'s success, Peter Tosh, one of the three original Wailers, said in an interview that he hated it.

Later, the song was covered by the Mighty Mighty Bosstones for their EP Ska-Core, the Devil, and More, by Neville Staple for his album Ska Au Go Go, as well as by the Specials for their cover album Today's Specials. The song was also sampled on Knaans track “T.I.A” on his album Troubadour.

== See also ==
- List of best-selling singles by country
