= Rude Boy (Bob Marley song) =

Song by Bob Marley

from the album Wailing Wailers
- Published: 1964
- Released: 1965
- Genre: Ska
- Label: Studio One Records, Coxsone Records, Doctor Bird Records
- Songwriter(s): Bob Marley
- Producer(s): Clement Dodd

"Rude Boy" is a 1964 Bob Marley song. One of his earliest songs and singles, it was included by Clement Dodd in the first The Wailers album Wailing Wailers, 1965. The anthem placed The Wailers at the head of the rude boy music culture. The song integrates vocal harmonizing with social commentary.
