= Working Wonders =

Studio album by Judy Mowatt
- Released: 1985
- Genre: Reggae
- Label: Shanachie

Judy Mowatt chronology
Only a Woman (1982)	Working Wonders (1985)	Love Is Overdue (1986)

Working Wonders is an album by the Jamaican musician Judy Mowatt, released in 1985. She supported it with a North American tour that included dates with Reggae Sunsplash. Working Wonders was nominated for a Grammy Award for "Best Reggae Recording", making Mowatt the first woman to receive a nomination in the category.

== Production ==
Mowatt wanted the album to incorporate musical styles beyond reggae, with a focus on calypso, pop, and Latin American sounds. The recording sessions were difficult due to malfunctioning equipment and studio fires. The album was delayed by a year, which led to Mowatt growing tired of the songs before the release date. She was asked by Shanachie Records to record certain songs, including "Lovemaking", which Mowatt did not care for. The rhythm tracks were recorded by Jamaican musicians; the producer Skip Drinkwater used American musicians for overdubs and synthesized sounds. The reggae band Zap Pow contributed to the sessions. "Black Man, Brown Man" is a cover of the Taj Mahal song. "Let's Dance" was written by Sangie Davis. "Hush Baby Mother" is about an unwed mother. "Traveling Woman" is an interpretation of Slim Smith's "Traveling Man".

== Critical reception ==
Professional ratings
Review scores
Source	Rating
AllMusic	3/5 stars
Robert Christgau	C−
The Encyclopedia of Popular Music	3/5 stars
MusicHound World: The Essential Album Guide	3.5/5 stars
The Philadelphia Inquirer	3/4 stars

The Gazette opined that the album has "strong mainstream appeal but remains 'rootsy' enough not to alienate bass and drum-crazed purists." The Detroit Free Press called it Mowatt's "most musically varied and satisfying album". The Los Angeles Times said that Working Wonders was "an enjoyable but frustrating portrait of the gift artist compelled to tone down the very qualities that make her music unique." Robert Christgau noted that "the positivity of reggae's most autonomous woman isn't rendered any more credible by her brightly idealistic delivery". The Trouser Press Record Guide said that "the LP suffers from its crossover efforts, but Mowatt's singing is more assured than ever."

== Track listing ==
No.	Title	Length
1.	"Black Man, Brown Man"
2.	"Working Wonders"
3.	"Lovemaking"
4.	"Let's Dance"
5.	"So Many Eyes"
6.	"Mother Africa"
7.	"Ethiopia Salaam"
8.	"Hush Baby Mother"
9.	"Traveling Woman"
10.	"King's Highway"
