= Look at Love =

Studio album by Judy Mowatt
- Released: 1991
- Genre: Reggae
- Label: Shanachie
- Producers: Sly and Robbie, Michael Bennett

Judy Mowatt chronology
Love Is Overdue (1987)	Look at Love (1991)	Rock Me (1993)

Look at Love is an album by the Jamaican musician Judy Mowatt, released in 1991. Mowatt supported the album with a North American tour.

== Production ==
The album was produced by Sly and Robbie and Michael Bennett. After realizing that she could tour successfully without new music to promote, Mowatt took her time thinking about the album and selecting its songs. Many of the songs touch on themes of female equality and empowerment.

"Watchdogs" is a cover of the UB40 song. Groovin' is a cover of the Young Rascals song. "Jah Love" is a cover of the Bob Marley song; "Jah Live" is the song that Marley asked the I-Threes to sing at their audition for him.

== Critical reception ==
Professional ratings
Review scores
Source	Rating
AllMusic	4/5 stars
Boston Herald	B+
MusicHound World: The Essential Album Guide	3/5 stars

The Gazette determined that "there's little to recommend Look at Love unless your tastes are reggae MOR." The Washington Post noted that, "despite its pop ambitions and the dance hall grooves carved out by producers Sly Dunbar and Robbie Shakespeare, there's no mistaking the album's inspirational and feminist bent."

The Chicago Tribune stated that Mowatt "never loses sight of the classic reggae sound or its concern for socially conscious messages." The Star Tribune thought that the album "finds her moving closer to a pop sound." The St. Louis Post-Dispatch concluded that the album "presses Mowatt's search for a fusion between reggae and contemporary American black music... She uses heavily electronic percussion beats with a pervasive undercurrent of hip-hop."

AllMusic wrote: "Breezy seems a word tailor-made for Judy Mowatt, and her sweet vocals, bouncy delivery, and bright as sunshine optimism make Look at Love an upbeat charmer."

== Track listing ==
No.	Title	Length
1.	"Fly African Eagle"
2.	"Watchdogs"
3.	"Groovin'"
4.	"Guilty"
5.	"Candle in the Window"
6.	"Jah Live"
7.	"Tomorrow Nation"
8.	"Skin of My Skin"
9.	"Look at Love"
10.	"Lioness in the Jungle"
11.	"Day by Day"
12.	"Warrior Queen"
13.	"Never Get Weary"
