= Forever Loving Jah =

Song by Bob Marley

from the album Uprising
- Released: 10 June 1980
- Genre: Reggae
- Length: 3:52
- Label: Island/Tuff Gong
- Songwriter: Bob Marley
- Producer: Bob Marley & The Wailers/Chris Blackwell

"Forever Loving Jah" is a song by Bob Marley. It is the ninth track on Bob Marley & the Wailers' ninth album, Uprising, produced by Chris Blackwell and released by Island Records.

As of today, there is only one confirmed live performance which took place during the Uprising Tour's US leg on September 19, 1980, at Madison Square Garden, being Marley's third-to-last concert ever.

It was Carlton Barrett's favorite song by Bob Marley & the Wailers.

== Certifications ==
Certifications for "Forever Loving Jah"
Region	Certification	Certified units/sales
New Zealand (RMNZ)	Gold	15,000^{‡}
^{‡} Sales+streaming figures based on certification alone.
