= Allan Cole (footballer) =

Jamaican footballer (1950–2025)

Personal information
- Date of birth: 14 October 1950
- Place of birth: Kingston, Jamaica
- Date of death: 9 September 2025 (aged 74)
- Place of death: Kingston, Jamaica
- Position: Forward

Youth career
- 1965–1968: Vere Technical

Senior career*
Years	Team	Apps	(Gls)
1968	Atlanta Chiefs	1	(0)
1968–1969	Real Mona		
1969–1972	Boys' Town		
1972	Náutico	3	(0)
1973–1977	Santos		

International career
- Jamaica
- * Club domestic league appearances and goals

Allan Aloysius "Skill" Cole (14 October 1950 – 9 September 2025), was a Jamaican professional footballer who played as a forward. He represented Jamaica at international level. During his career, Cole was Jamaica's "most celebrated player".

In addition to his football career, Cole was also the tour manager of the Jamaican reggae star Bob Marley and his band The Wailers during the 1970s.

== Early years ==
Cole was born on 14 October 1950, and grew up in the middle-income neighbourhood of Woodford Park in Kingston, Jamaica. His father, Allan Cole Sr, was a civil servant, and his mother was a dressmaker.

== Career ==
Cole played in the North American Soccer League with the Atlanta Chiefs and in Brazil with Náutico.

He appeared in three FIFA World Cup qualifying matches for the Jamaica national team.

== Music ==
Cole is credited on Bob Marley and the Wailers' Rastaman Vibration album as co-writing the 1976 song "War", though according to The Guardian the lyrics were actually from a speech by Haile Selassie that Cole brought to Marley's attention.

== Death ==
Cole died on 9 September 2025, in Kingston, at the age of 74.
