= King Sporty =

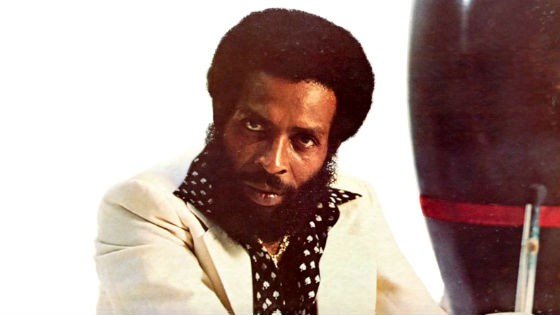

Background information
- Born: Noel George Williams; September 19, 1943; Portland, Jamaica
- Died: January 5, 2015 (aged 71) Miami, Florida
- Labels: Tashamba, Konduko

Noel George Williams (19 September 1943 – 5 January 2015), better known as King Sporty, was a Jamaican DJ, reggae musician, and record producer for the Tashamba and Konduko labels. He is best known for co-writing the song, "Buffalo Soldier", made famous by Bob Marley.

== Biography ==
Born in Portland, Jamaica, in his early days Sporty rose to become a studio sideman under Clement Dodd's tutelage at Studio One, and recorded for Dodd as a deejay as well as deejaying on Dodd's sound system. In 1965 he released the track "El Cid", credited to King Sporty and Justin Yap.

In the early 1970s he moved to Miami, Florida and began producing music there under his Tashamba and Konduko labels. In 1977 Sporty released an album, Mr. Rhythm on his own Konduko label. He evolved from reggae to funk to disco to electro to Miami bass between the 1970s and 1980s. Sporty found lasting hits in the electro funk canon with Connie Case's "Get on Down" and "Haven't Been Funked Enough", under his Ex Tras moniker when he made licensing deals with Tommy Boy Records in 1982. His original version of "Buffalo Soldier" was released in the late 1970s. Marley first recorded the song in Miami towards the end of the Kaya tour in 1978.

He released the track "Computer Age" in 1992 under the name Sporty and the Laptop.

Sporty was married to the American soul and rhythm and blues singer, Betty Wright.

International Reggae and World Music Awards – IRAWMA honored Mr. Williams with their Lifetime Achievement Award in 2010.

In 2013 Sporty's song "Self Destruct" was sampled by Justin Timberlake for his song "That Girl" on his The 20/20 Experience album.

He died on 5 January 2015 in Miami, Florida, aged 71.

== Group names used ==
- King Sporty & The Root Rockers
- King Sporty and the Ex Tras
- Noel Williams & The Extra Funk Factory
- Sporty & The Laptop

== Discography ==
- Deep Reggae Roots (1976), Konduko
- Mr. Rhythm (1977), Konduko
- Extra Funky (1983), Dancefloor
- Meet Me at the Disco (1983), Dancefloor
