= One Drop (Bob Marley and the Wailers song) =

Song by Bob Marley and the Wailers

from the album Survival
- Recorded: 1979
- Genre: Reggae
- Length: 3:51
- Label: Island Records/Tuff Gong
- Songwriter: Bob Marley

"One Drop" is a 1979 Bob Marley song from the album Survival (1979) notable for exemplifying the one drop rhythm, one of the three main reggae drum rhythms, as performed by The Wailers' drummer Carlton Barrett. The song uses Marley's most militantly Rastafarian lyrics. "In 'One Drop,' Marley asserts that he does not want 'devil philosophy', he wants the 'teachings of His Majesty.' In this sense Rastafari was not merely a religious faith, for Marley it was a political and philosophical worldview." The song was re-released on the compilation album Gold (2005).

The name One Drop is also used by the Marley Beverage Company, partly associated with the family of Bob Marley, as the brand name for Marley "premium Jamaican coffee beverage made with real cane sugar and all-natural ingredients".

== Certifications ==
Certifications for "One Drop"
| Region | Certification | Certified units/sales |
|---|---|---|
| New Zealand (RMNZ) | 2× Platinum | 60,000^{‡} |
^{‡} Sales+streaming figures based on certification alone.
