= Nathaniel Ian Wynter =

Jamaican musician (1954–2022)

Nathaniel Ian Wynter (30 September 1954 – 30 March 2022), also known as Natty Wailer, was a Jamaican-born musician and Rastafarian, best known for his work with Bob Marley and the Wailers, Aston Barrett and King Tubby. He is credited on recordings as Natty Wailer, Ian Winter, Ian Wynter, or Brother Ian.

== Early life ==
Wynter was born and raised in Kingston, Jamaica. His father was a psychiatric nurse and his mother a housekeeper and day labourer. He developed an interest in music while still at school, playing keyboards, guitar. In 1972, soon after finishing high school, Wynter met Wailers bass player Aston "Family Man" Barrett at the home of Robert Shakespeare, one of Barrett's students. Wynter had become interested in the bass guitar, and told Barrett he wanted to improve his playing. Barrett invited him to spend some time at 56 Hope Road (now the Bob Marley Museum), where Marley lived and recorded.

== Career with Bob Marley and the Wailers ==
The house at 56 Hope Road (aka Island House) was open for rastas to come and go as they pleased, and Wynter was one of those who took up residence. Family Man Barrett introduced Wynter to Marley, and told him he was a keyboard player who would be staying at the house for a while. Over the next several years, Wynter became a part of the Wailers' entourage and a contributing member of the group. "He was always in the music room [the band's demo studio at Island House] with us," recalls Barrett. Wynter played (usually keyboards) during rehearsals, toured with the band as both an assistant chef and musician, and served as an alternate keyboard player on tour.

Wynter's first appearances on Marley's studio releases were on "Who the Cap Fit" and "War" from the Rastaman Vibration album. He would go on to be a regular session musician with the band, credited on 18 songs on the Songs of Freedom Bob Marley box set, including the 12" mixes of "Exodus" and "Jammin'" as well as "Rat Race", "Crazy Baldheads" and a live version of "No Woman No Cry".

Tyrone Downie and Earl Lindo (aka "Wire" or "Wya") were the Wailers' main keyboard players. But because the band's sound relied so heavily on keyboards, Wynter was on standby and would fill in on tour for either Downie or Lindo, as required. He first performed on stage with the Wailers during a 1979 Trinidad show that followed the band's residency at the Apollo Theater. Wynter went on to appear on stage with the Wailers in the US, Europe, Australia and New Zealand. He was the band's keyboard player during Bob Marley's final performance, at the Stanley Theater in Pittsburgh, on 23 September 1980. Of the final show, Wynter says, "Lindo decided not to play for reasons beyond my knowledge... Bob called me in to fill his position that night at his last show in Pittsburgh."

== Songwriting Process and Aston Barrett Lawsuit ==
Wynter has described the collaborative process through which Marley wrote, and how he and other musicians at times helped shape them. For instance, for "Them Belly Full" Wynter and another Hope Road regular, Legon Coghill, a.k.a. Leghorn, an artist who used to help distribute records for Tuff Gong, contributed to the song’s basic outline as the Barrett brothers began to jam, while Carly [Barrett] kept repeating the phrase, ‘Them belly full, but we hungry'". Wynter says he would often pick along while Marley was composing songs, so that he could then share the tunes with the other musicians. "I remember after one of these sessions again he called me to the rehearsal room and asked me to show the bass player Familyman [Aston Barrett] the line I was picking while he was jamming the song "Could You Be Loved" earlier in the day."

Recollections such as these would later play a role in the lawsuit brought by Barrett against Island Records and the Marley family over authorship of a number of Bob Marley's songs. Barrett claimed that the label owed him and his late brother Carlton Barrett £60 million worth of unpaid royalties from six songs they had written, as well as royalties flowing from a contract the Barretts had signed in 1974, but which the Marley family and Island Records claimed was superseded by a subsequent agreement.

Wynter testified in Barrett's favour, and while the judge found him to be a credible witness, he would ultimately rule against Barrett, barring him from further legal action on the matter.

== Personal life and career beyond the Wailers ==
After Marley's death, Wynter drifted out of the music business, returning to The Wailers and touring with them in 1999 and 2000.

During the years that Wynter was involved with the Wailers, he also recorded with numerous other Jamaican musicians, including Aston Barrett, Peter Tosh, Linval Thompson, King Tubby and Dennis Brown.

In 2000, after falling in love with an Irish woman, Wynter moved to Ireland, but eventually returned to Jamaica. He toured and recorded with his band the Reggae Vibes, with whom he released two albums, Lifted (2000) and Destiny (2013).

As Natty Wailer, Wynter had also collaborated with local Irish acts such as Sean Agus Noa, the Henry Girls, and Mark Black and his Roots Band as well as the Northern Irish reggae group Bréag, and Australian dub/reggae act Secret Masters.

Wynter died in London on 30 March 2022 after a long illness.
