= War (Bob Marley song) =

Song by Bob Marley and the Wailers

from the album Rastaman Vibration
- Released: 1976
- Recorded: 1976
- Genre: Reggae
- Length: 3:36
- Label: Island
- Songwriters: Credited to Carlton Barrett, Allan Cole
- Producers: Bob Marley and the Wailers

"War" is a song recorded and made popular by Bob Marley. It first appeared on Bob Marley and the Wailers' 1976 Island Records album, Rastaman Vibration, Marley's only top 10 album in the USA. (In UK it reached position 15 on May 15, 1976.) The lyrics are almost entirely derived from a speech made by Ethiopian Emperor Haile Selassie I before the Eighteenth Session of UN General Assembly on 4 October 1963. The speech was reminiscent of the one he made in 1936 to the League of Nations. The previous year, 1935, two years after Hitler's rise to power, Ethiopia had been invaded by Italy and he had been living in exile at the time.

== Songwriting controversy ==
"War" is credited to Allan "Skill" Cole (idea) and Carlton "Carly" Barrett (music); the music is an extension of the one-drop drumming style, which Carlton Barrett had either invented, or at least developed and refined. The lyrics are a near-exact repetition of a 1963 speech at the UN by the Ethiopian emperor Haile Selassie. However, the two simple guitar chords and the semi-improvised, spirited melody put to Selassie's words are said to be unmistakably Marley's.

According to Stephen Davis' biography Bob Marley, it also appears that Marley had credited several of his multi-million-selling 1974-1976 songs to close friends and relatives because he was working under the terms of a 1968 publishing contract with Cayman Publishing that would have otherwise deprived him of much of his songwriting royalties. Crediting close friends, such as footballer Allan Cole or Wailers drummer Carlton Barrett, enabled Bob Marley to circumvent his contractual obligations until he could negotiate new, more favorable agreements. This practice, along with the practice of crediting friends who contributed to compositions (even if they had only contributed ideas) created confusion about the copyright ownership of several songs, including "War", following Marley's sudden death, especially since he did not leave a will.

Barrett's brother, Wailer musician Aston "Family Man" Barrett (who created the bass line, considered key to the song's effectiveness), brought lawsuits against the Marley estate (of which Marley’s widow, Rita Marley was the legal beneficiary) claiming unpaid royalties and credit for songs such as "War" alleging that they had been written by others either solely or in collaboration with Bob Marley. One such suit was resolved by a settlement in 1994 in which Barrett was paid $500,000. Barrett continued to pursue legal action: he sought £60 million (the equivalent of $113.6 million at the then-current exchange rate) in a suit against the Island-Universal record label and the Marley family. That case was dismissed on the grounds that the terms of the earlier settlement prohibited any further claim on the estate.

== Background ==
As taught by the Original Gong, Leonard P Howell, Marley, along with fellow Rastafari, worship Haile Selassie I of Ethiopia as the incarnation of God, and refer to him as "Ras Tafari," "Jah" or "The Lion of Judah" which Marley does in many of his songs. To him, Haile Selassie was not only one of the most prominent African leaders of his time, he was also identified as God returning to Earth as "King of Kings, Lord of Lords" (Revelation 19, 16), imperial titles born both by Haile Selassie and Ethiopian Emperor Menelik II before him. It was Menelik II, who created this self-styled imperial title in the late 19th century after he succeeded in uniting Ethiopia. Marley did however accept Ethiopian Orthodox Christianity eight months before his death. Haile Selassie gave the "War" speech on October 4, 1963, calling for world peace at the 1963 U.N. General Assembly in New York City. This historical speech was spoken a few weeks after the Organization of African Unity (OAU) was founded in Ethiopian capital city Addis Ababa, where Haile Selassie chaired a summit meeting gathering almost every African head of state (The King of Morocco had declined the invitation).

This U.N. speech resounded even louder as Haile Selassie had made a name for himself on the international scene in 1936, when he spoke at The League of Nations in Geneva. There, Haile Selassie warned the world that if the members of the League did not fulfill their obligation to militarily assist Ethiopia against the invasion by fascist Italy, the League would then cease to exist as a matter of fact and the rest of the member states were to suffer the same fate as his country. Three years later World War II broke out. This visionary speech granted Haile Selassie much respect around the world, eventually leading to British military support, which helped freeing his country in 1941. Addressing the world again in 1963, Haile Selassie's words bore full weight. In picking this utterance for lyrics, Bob Marley thus projected two dimensions of the Ethiopian Emperor: the head of state as well as the Living God Rastafari he saw him as.

== Lyrics ==
Although credited to Emperor Haile Selassie I, whose Christian name is Tafari Makonen, the real author of the text remains uncertain. It is sometimes believed that it was written by Lorenzo Tazaz, a close contributor who wrote many of the Ethiopian leader's most important speeches, including a historic one given in 1935 to the League of Nations. But Tazaz died in 1947, over fifteen years before the 1963 U.N. utterance. Spoken in Ethiopia's official Amharic language at the U.N., the 1963 speech was published in English in Important Utterances of H.I.M. Emperor Haile Selassie I 1963-1972. The book gave permission to freely use its contents: "Any portion of this book could be reproduced by any process without permission." The song uses part of Selassie's speech that calls for equality among all without regard to race, class, or nationality in his hymnal cry for peace. It also asserts, quoting Selassie directly, that until the day of an equal society, there will be war. In the original speech, Selassie urged U.N. officials and country representatives to disarm nuclear weapons, and to end international exploitation (specifically with Africa). The song honors Haile Selassie I while calling for action against racial inequality and international injustice. The part of the speech used by Bob Marley was preceded by the following words:

Last May, in Addis Ababa, I convened a meeting of Heads of African States and Governments. In three days, the thirty-two nations represented at that Conference demonstrated to the world that when the will and the determination exist, nations and peoples of diverse backgrounds can and will work together. In unity, to the achievement of common goals and the assurance of that equality and brotherhood which we desire. On the question of racial discrimination, the Addis Ababa Conference taught, to those who will learn, this further lesson:

Here is the part of Haile Selassie's speech put to music by Marley in his original song "War" (Bob Marley slightly modified the original words, changing each "that until" to "until" and added the word "war" several times):

That until the philosophy which holds one race superior and another inferior is finally and permanently discredited and abandoned; That until there are no longer first-class and second-class citizens of any nation; That until the color of a man's skin is of no more significance than the color of his eyes; That until the basic human rights are equally guaranteed to all without regard to race; That until that day, the dream of lasting peace and world citizenship and the rule of international morality will remain but a fleeting illusion, to be pursued but never attained; And until the ignoble and unhappy regimes that hold our brothers in Angola, in Mozambique and in South Africa in subhuman bondage have been toppled and destroyed; Until bigotry and prejudice and malicious and inhuman self-interest have been replaced by understanding and tolerance and good-will; Until all Africans stand and speak as free beings, equal in the eyes of all men, as they are in the eyes of Heaven; Until that day, the African continent will not know peace. We Africans will fight, if necessary, and we know that we shall win, as we are confident in the victory of good over evil. – Haile Selassie I

Here are the lyrics from Bob Marley and the Wailers in the album Rastaman Vibration:

Until the philosophy which hold one race superior / And another / Inferior / Is finally / And permanently / Discredited / And abandoned / -Everywhere is war - / Me say war.

That until there no longer / First class and second class citizens of any nation / Until the colour of a man's skin / Is of no more significance / than the colour of his eyes / - Me say war.

That until the basic human rights / Are equally guaranteed to all, / Without regard to race / - Dis a war.

That until that day / The dream of lasting peace, / World citizenship / Rule of international morality / Will remain in but a fleeting illusion to be pursued, / But never attained / - Now everywhere is war - / War.

And until the ignoble and unhappy regimes / that hold our brothers in Angola, / In Mozambique, / South Africa / Sub-human bondage / Have been toppled, / Utterly destroyed / - Well, everywhere is war - / Me say war.

'War in the east, / War in the west, / War up north, / War down south - / War - war - / Rumours of war. / And until that day, / The African continent / Will not know peace, / We Africans will fight - we find it necessary / - And we know we shall win / As we are confident / In the victory

Of good over evil -/ Good over evil, yeah! / Good over evil - / Good over evil, yeah! / Good over evil - / Good over evil, yeah!

A different mix, which includes a different horn arrangement, released as a bonus track in the Deluxe Edition (2002) of the Rastaman Vibration album, revealed that Marley had recorded an extra verse also adapted from the original speech:

Until bigotry and prejudice, malicious and inhuman self-interest have been replaced by understanding and tolerance and good will, yeah, war. Until all Africans stand and speak as free beings equal in the eyes of the almighty, war. Everywhere is war.

In his speech to the U.N., Selassie reminded his listeners that "these are only words; their value depends wholly on our will to observe and honor them and give them content and meaning."

== The song ==
The original version of "War" was recorded at Harry J's studio in Kingston, Jamaica, by engineer Sylvan Morris. It includes Aston "Family Man" Barrett on Fender Jazz bass, his brother Carlton 'Carly' Barrett on drums, Earl "Chinna" Smith on guitar, Alvin "Seeco" Patterson on percussion and Tyrone Downie on keyboards. Marcia Griffiths, Judy Mowatt and Rita Marley sing harmony vocals as the I-Threes. It was produced by Bob Marley & The Wailers and mixed at Miami's Criteria studio by Aston "Family Man" Barrett and Chris Blackwell with engineer Alex Sadkin.

With such potent and meaningful lyrics, the song soon became one of Bob Marley's greatest classics, carrying the Rastafari message to the world in Haile Selassie I's own words. As from 1977, when Bob Marley & The Wailers embarked for their first major world tour in June, "War" was sung at most concerts until Marley's last show on September 23, 1980 in Pittsburgh, Pennsylvania. Two live recordings of the song have since been released officially by Tuff Gong/Island Records. The first one was issued on the 1978 Babylon by Bus album recorded live at the Pavillon de Paris in Paris, France, on June 26, 1978. The second was recorded at the Rainbow Theatre in London, England, on June 4, 1977, and was issued on the 2001 Deluxe Edition of the Exodus album. Predating these two is another version, recorded on May 26, 1976 and released in 2003 on Live at the Roxy.

== Haile Selassie version ==
Two other hit versions of the song featuring Bob Marley & the Wailers can also be heard. A vinyl single released in Jamaica on Bruno Blum's Human Race label in December 1997 includes samples of Bob Marley's voice saying "Rastafari is the prince of Peace." But most importantly, the song features the original recording of Haile Selassie I's Amharic speech done in 1963, overdubbed on a new rhythm track played by Wailers original members. The B-side offers a welcome English translation of the speech by Bruno Blum, whose spoken rendition of War includes the second part of the speech, which was not used by Bob Marley:

The basis of racial discrimination and colonialism has been economic, and it is with economic weapons that these evils have been and can be overcome. In pursuance of resolutions adopted at the Addis Ababa summit conference, African states have undertaken certain measures in the economic field which, if adopted by all member states of the United Nations, would soon reduce intransigeance to reason. I ask, today, for adherence to these measures by every nation represented [here] which is truly devoted to the principles enunciated in the charter.

We must act while we can, while the occasion exists to exert those legitimate pressures available to us lest time run out and resort be had to less happy means.

The great nations of the world would do well to remember that in the modern age even their own fates are not wholly in their hands. Peace demands the united efforts of us all. Who can foresee what spark might ignite the fuse?

The stake of each one of us is identical-life or death. We all wish to live. We all seek a world in which men are freed of the burdens of ignorance, poverty, hunger and disease. And we shall all be hard-pressed to escape the deadly rain of nuclear fall-out should catastrophe overtake us.

The problems which confront us today are, equally, unprecedented. They have no counterparts in human experience. Men search the pages of history for solutions, for precedents, but there are none. This then, is the ultimate challenge. Where are we to look for our survival, for the answers to the questions which have never before been posed ? We must look, first, to the Almighty God, Who has raised man above the animals and endowed him with intelligence and reason. We must put our faith in Him, that He will not desert us or permit us to destroy humanity which He created in His image.

And we must look into ourselves, into the depth of our souls. We must become something we have never been and for which our education and experience and environment have ill-prepared us. We must become bigger than we have been : more courageous, greater in spirit, larger in outlook. We must become members of a new race, overcoming petty prejudice, owing our ultimate allegiance not to nations but to our fellow men within the human community.

A second mix of this new recording was also released, charting at the #1 spot in the U.K. Echoes magazine in April 1998. This time it featured samples of Bob Marley & the Wailers' song Selassie Is the Chapel (adapted from Crying in the Chapel), where Bob and Rita Marley's voices can be heard on a sizeable part of the record, as well as Selassie's original "foundation lead vocal," creating a virtual duet between Haile Selassie I and his apostle Bob Marley. Both new versions were recorded at Kingston Musick Studio in Kingston, Jamaica, engineered by Rudy Thomas. They include Wailers survivors Aston "Family Man" Barrett on bass guitar and piano, Mikey "Boo" Richards on drums and Earl "Wire" Lindo on keyboards, along with guitar and backing vocals by Bruno Blum. Percussionist Norbert "Nono" Nobour and backing singer Tatiana Prus were later added. The sessions were produced by Bruno Blum and mixed by Thierry Bertomeu at AB Studio in St. Denis, France.

Released in Europe on Blum's Rastafari label in early 1998, both "War" and "War/Selassie Is the Chapel" were successful singles contributing to the "new roots" reggae scene where Rastafari themes sung by the likes of Garnett Silk, Luciano and Dennis Brown were popular again after more than a decade of decline. Several singles derived from this new recording were subsequently issued on the label, including Buffalo Bill's "War"/"Warmongers", Big Youth's "We No Want No War" and Joseph Cotton's "Conflicts" backed by Doc Reggae's spoken French version "Guerre". A full-length CD album entitled The War Album, including all versions, was issued in Europe on the Rastafari label in 2001. A vinyl album was released in Jamaica on the Human Race label in 2004, and the full War Album was reissued in 2010 as part of the Human Race label double CD anthology.

== Notable cover version ==
- The 1992 Sinéad O'Connor Saturday Night Live performance of an a capella version of "War" used slightly modified lyrics, referring to child abuse in addition to racism. At the end of this performance, O'Connor tore up a photograph of Pope John Paul II. She later recorded the song for her 2005 album Throw Down Your Arms.
