= One drop rhythm =

Drum pattern

One Drop drum pattern.
One Drop drum pattern, sixteenth-note variant or.

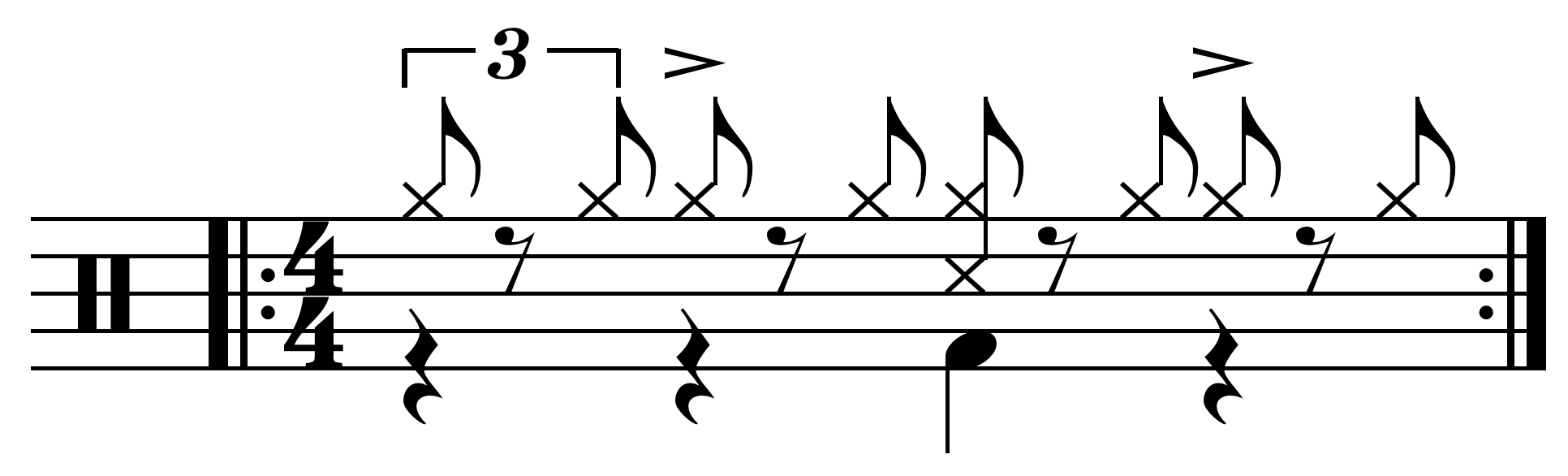
One Drop drum pattern, half-time variant. Also typical ska pattern.

One drop rhythm is a reggae style drum beat.

Popularized by Carlton Barrett, long-time drummer of Bob Marley and the Wailers, the creator is disputed, and it has been attributed to drummers including Barrett, his brother Aston, and Winston Grennan.

== Characteristics ==
The backbeat is characterized by the dominant snare drum stroke (usually a click produced by cross-sticking) and bass drum both sounding on the third beat of every four, while beat one is left empty. Thus, the expected hit on beat one is "dropped," creating the one-drop effect. Dropping out the bass on the "one" of the measure further accentuates the downbeat of the drums creating the rhythm.

This may be seen in the drum notation for the typical rock drum pattern:

 HH|x-x-x-x-x-x-x-x-||
  S|----o-------o---||
  B|o-------o-------||
    1 + 2 + 3 + 4 +

and the one drop:

 HH|x-x-x-x-x-x-x-x-||
  S|--------x-------||
  B|--------o-------||
    1 + 2 + 3 + 4 +

== Variations ==
The rockers rhythm is essentially the one drop with a steady bass drum on every quarter note.

The steppers rhythm is the one drop with a steady bass drum on every eighth note, though one drop is slower than a ska pattern, and rockers is often slower than one drop.

== Examples ==
An instructive example of this drum beat is Bob Marley and the Wailers' song "One Drop" which talks about this rhythm.

Examples of songs using the one drop from Bob Marley and the Wailers' album Legend, with Carlton Barrett on drums, include: "No Woman, No Cry", "Three Little Birds", "Get Up, Stand Up", "Waiting in Vain", "Stir It Up", "One Love/People Get Ready", and "I Shot the Sheriff". Other examples include Peter Tosh's "Legalize It", Steel Pulse's "Higher Than High", and Bob Marley's "Exodus". Also The Upsetters's "One Step Dub" (1976) and Bob Marley & The Wailers's "Crazy Baldhead" (1976).

Examples of songs using the steppers from Legend include: "Is This Love", "Exodus", "Buffalo Soldier", "Satisfy My Soul", "Jamming". Other examples include Burning Spear's "Lion".

The one drop style has also been used and referenced in numerous non-reggae songs, including "Lucille Has Messed My Mind Up" by Frank Zappa, "The Spirit of Radio" by Rush, and "You Enjoy Myself" by Phish all placing their own twist on the one drop rhythm.

== See also ==
- Half time (music)
- Rhythm guitar § Reggae
- Ska stroke
