= Constantine "Vision" Walker =

Jamaican musician

Constantine Walker, also known as "Vision" or "Dream" (born Constantine Antonio Walker, Jr., (born 19 October 1951, Jamaica) is a singer songwriter and musician. He was an original member of reggae group The Soulettes, with his cousin Rita Anderson (Marley) and Marlene "Precious" Gifford in the early 1960s, and was briefly a member of The Wailers along with Bunny Wailer and Peter Tosh. Vision is a former member of New York based groups Jah Malla, I Performers and JARO. He is also a former member of the California-based group The Rastafarians.

Vision is from Trench Town, Kingston, Jamaica. At age 13 his cousin, Rita Marley, encouraged him to start singing. As a result, he made his first professional appearance with the Soulettes, which consisted of Rita Marley, Marlene "Precious" Gifford and himself. Within their first year together they received a contract from Coxson’s Studio 1 record label.

In 1980 Vision played rhythm guitar in the company band of the theatrical musical, Reggae on Broadway. Throughout the 1980s and 1990s Vision worked steadily doing either studio session work with artists such as Michael Kamen or session and touring with Tosh (from 1981 thru 1987). When Kamen produced an album for Jah Malla he asked Vision to join them in the recording session of their album. From 1984 thru 1986, Vision worked with Bunny Wailer on his album Market Place. From 1989 through 1993 Vision worked once again with his cousins – Ziggy Marley and The Melody Makers.

== Sources ==
- Discogs
- Bigupradio bio
- Steffens, R.; Pierson, L.J. (2005). Bob Marley and the Wailers: The Definitive Discography. LMH. ISBN 978-976-8184-75-7.
- Vision Walker
- About 4
