= Junior Braithwaite =

Jamaican musician

Franklin Delano Alexander "Junior" Braithwaite (4 April 1949 – 2 June 1999) was a reggae musician from Kingston, Jamaica and the youngest member of the vocal group, The Wailing Wailers.

== Early career ==
The Wailing Wailers was a vocal group Bob Marley, Bunny Wailer and Peter Tosh started in 1963, together with Braithwaite, when ska music had become popular in Jamaica. Soon after Beverly Kelso and Cherry Smith joined the group as backing vocalists.

Braithwaite was with The Wailers for eight months and sang lead on such songs as "Habits", "Straight and Narrow Way", "Don't Ever Leave Me", and "It Hurts To Be Alone". He had the best voice in The Wailers, according to Studio One's Coxsone Dodd, who discovered the band's talent. Bob Marley later commented: "Junior used to sing high. It's just nowadays that I'm beginning to realize that he sounded like one of the Jackson Five. When he left we had to look for a sound that Bunny, Peter and me could manage."

== Later years ==
Braithwaite left the band in 1964 and moved to the United States with hopes of pursuing a medical career. He lived primarily in Chicago and southern Wisconsin for the next 20 years, and returned to Jamaica in 1984 to work with Bunny Wailer on a Wailers' reunion project. With the murder of Peter Tosh in September 1987, plans for world tours with a reunited Wailers never materialized.

== Death ==
Braithwaite and fellow musician Chaka/ Lawrence Scott were shot dead in Scott's home in Kingston on 20 June 1999.
