= Beverley Kelso =

Jamaican singer (born 1948)

- Born: 5 April 1948 (age 77); Kingston, Jamaica
- Genres: Ska
- Years active: 1963–1965
- Labels: Studio One

Beverley Kelso (born 5 April 1948) is a Jamaican singer best known as an early member of The Wailers.

Born in Kingston, Jamaica, she attended Miss Nembhard Preparatory School and Denham Town Primary School in Kingston.

She was a backing vocalist, and one of the founding members of The Wailers (between 1963 and 1965). According to Kelso, she sang on 25 tracks by the group, the last in late 1965.

Kelso immigrated to the United States in 1979.

The deaths of Junior Braithwaite in 1999, of Cherry Smith in 2008, and of Bunny Wailer in 2021 have left Kelso as the only surviving founding member of the Wailers.

In 2012 she stated that she was planning to write a book about her time in The Wailers. She now lives in Brooklyn, New York.
