= Cherry Smith =

Jamaican vocalist (1943–2008)

Cherry Smith (born Ermine Ortense Bramwell, 22 August 1943 – 24 September 2008) was a backing vocalist for the original Wailers from 1963 to 1966. She was also called Cherry Green (her half-brother Carlton had that surname).

== Early beginnings ==
Smith was born in the Trench Town district of Kingston. She was nicknamed "Cherry" as a girl due to her light complexion. According to Bob Marley's official website Beverley Kelso is the only surviving member of the original Wailers, after Smith's death. However, it did not list Smith as an official member of the group. Smith was with the group for more than two years and took part in their audition for Clement "Coxsone" Dodd in 1963, but as she had a full-time job and a child to support, she was unable to attend the group's first recording session, and was replaced by Kelso.

== Later career ==
Smith continued to contribute to recording sessions and sang backing vocals on several of the later Wailers recordings, including:

- "Lonesome Feeling"
- "There She Goes"
- "What's New Pussycat?"
- "Let The Lord Be Seen in You"

She left the group in late 1966, and moved to Miami, Florida, in 1969 to work as a nurse. She moved around the United States, finally settling in West Palm Beach, Florida.

== Death ==
She died in Miami in 2008, aged 65.
