= Judy Mowatt =

Jamaican singer (born 1952)

Judy Mowatt OD
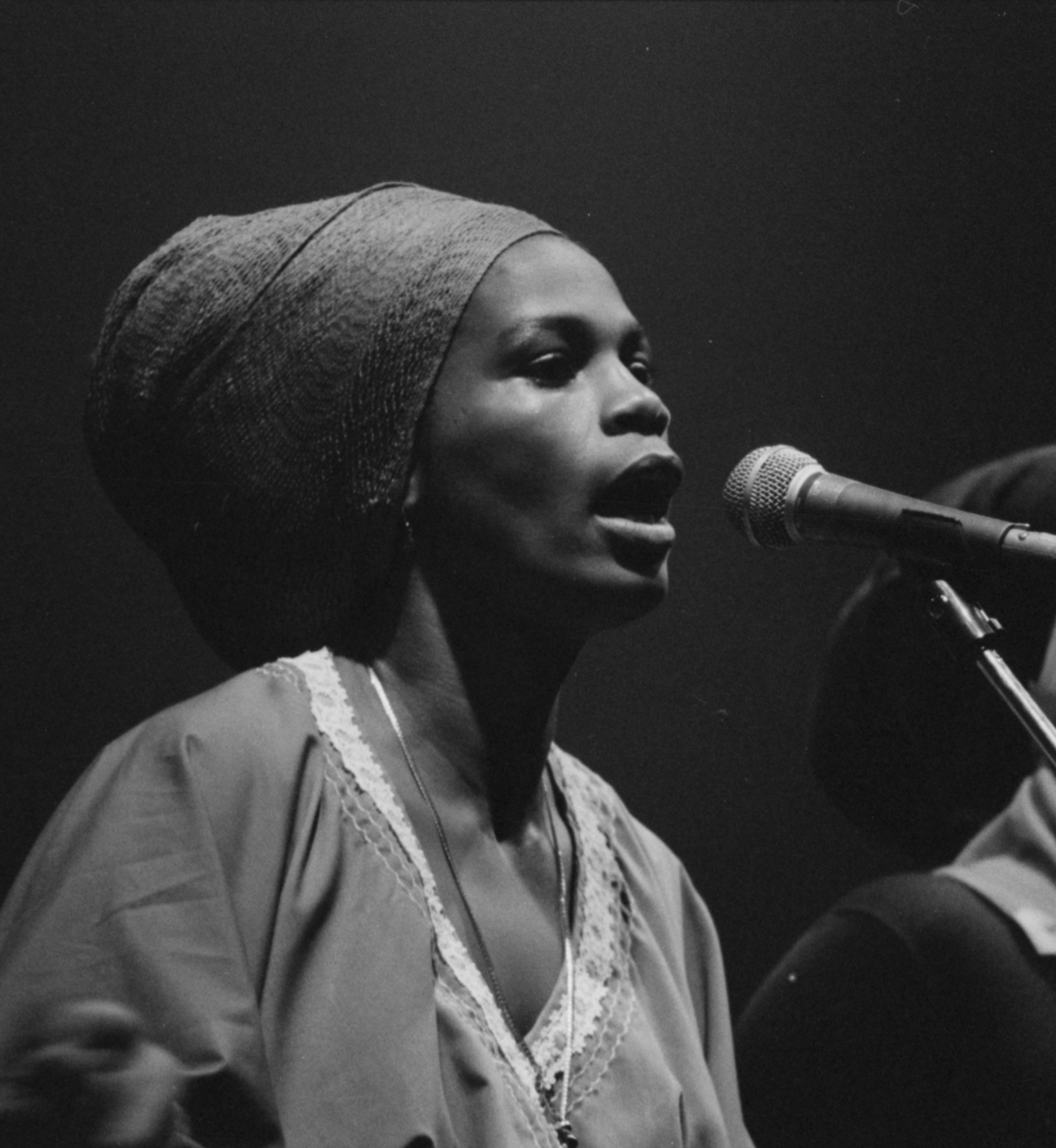
- Mowatt in 1980

Background information
- Born: Judith Veronica Mowatt; 1952 (age 73–74); Gordon Town, Jamaica
- Genres: Reggae, roots reggae, gospel
- Instrument: Vocals
- Years active: 1967 – present
- Labels: Tuff Gong, Shanachie Records, Gay Feet

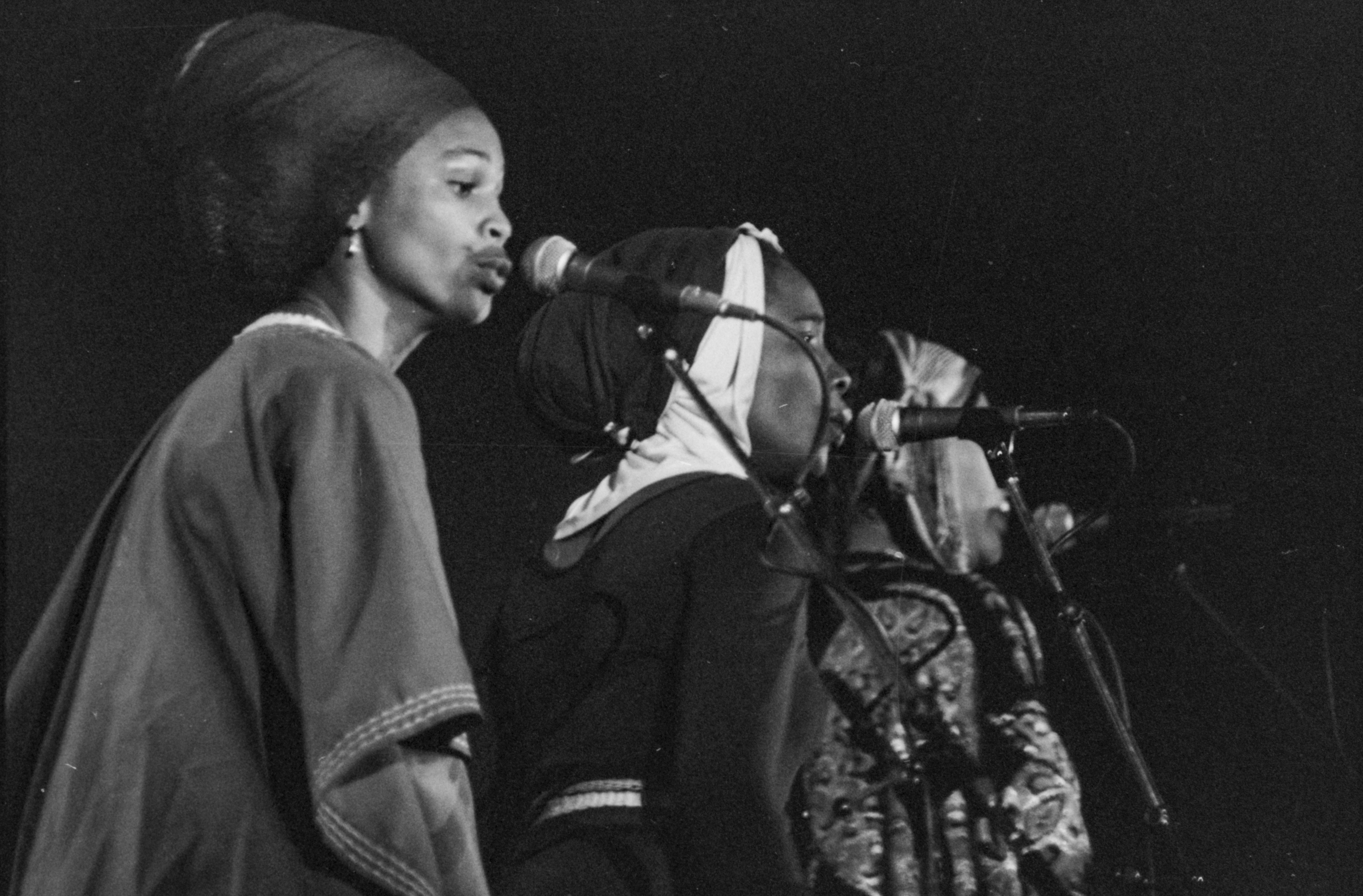
Judy Mowatt performing as a part of the I-Threes in Zurich, May 1980

Judith Veronica Mowatt, OD (born 1952) is a Jamaican reggae artist. As well as being a solo artist, from 1974 she was also a member of the I Threes, the trio of backing vocalists for Bob Marley & The Wailers.

== Early life ==
Mowatt was born in Gordon Town, St. Andrew Parish, Jamaica. At the age of 13, she became a member of a dance troupe that toured Jamaica and other islands in the Caribbean. Her initial ambition was to become a registered nurse. Her earliest musical influences were Aretha Franklin, Otis Redding, Curtis Mayfield, Dionne Warwick, Bob Marley, Marcia Griffiths, The Staple Singers and The Soulettes. A coincidental meeting with two teenage girls who were earlier in her dance troupe led to the formation of the Gaylettes, in 1967.

== Career ==
In 1974, Mowatt got her big break by joining Bob Marley's backing vocal trio the "I Threes".

Her Black Woman album (Ashandan, 1979) came out the same year as I Three member Marcia Griffiths's album At Studio One. It is considered by many critics to be the greatest reggae album by a female artist. It was also the first reggae album recorded by a woman acting as her own producer, in collaboration with the renowned Jamaican artist Freddie McGregor, with whom she also had a romantic relationship, resulting in the birth of their daughter Yashemabeth McGregor.

The song "Joseph", from this album, was dedicated to Bob Marley while he was still alive, as she believed that the Jamaican musician was the reincarnation of the biblical figure Joseph from the Old Testament.

She became the first female singer nominated for a Grammy Award in the category of reggae music when her Working Wonders album was nominated in 1985.

Formerly a member of the Rastafari movement, in the late 1990s she converted to Christianity and now sings Gospel music.

In 1999 the Jamaican government made her an Officer of the Order of Distinction for "services to music".

== Identity mixup ==
Some sources wrongfully assumed Judy Mowatt to be identical to Jean Watt (the longtime wife of Bunny Livingston/Wailer). This mixup possibly originated from Mowatt using several different stage names, for legal reasons, in the early 1970s: Julianne, Julie-Ann, and Jean. Bunny Wailer credited his wife, Jean Watt, for writing some of the tracks recorded during sessions for the album Burnin' (1973): "Hallelujah Time", "Pass It On" and "Reincarnated Soul". The latter song first appeared on a single as B-side to "Concrete Jungle" and later - with the name changed to "Reincarnated Souls" – on Bunny Wailer's first solo album Blackheart Man (1976).

== Discography ==
- Mellow Mood (1975), Tuff Gong
- Black Woman (1979), Ashandan / (1980), Grove Music (Island Records)
- Mr. Dee-J (1981), Ashandan
- Only A Woman (1982), Shanachie
- Working Wonders (1985), Shanachie, Ashandan
- Love Is Overdue (1986), Shanachie
- I Shall Sing (1991), Trojan Records
- Look at Love (1991), Koch International / Shanachie
- Rock Me (1993), Pow Wow
- Love (1998), African Love / Jet Star
- Something Old, Something New (2002), Judy M Music/Tuff Gong International
- Sing Our Own Song (2003), Shanachie

=== with the I Three ===
- Beginning (1986), Tuff Gong / EMI - with Rita Marley and Marcia Griffiths, credited to 'I-Three'

=== with the Gaylettes ===
- We Shall Sing (Girl Group Rocksteady, Reggae And Soul 1967-73) (2001), Westside (compilation)
- Rescue Me (1967-1973) (2016), Roots Reggae Library (compilation)
