= Buffalo Soldier (song) =

1983 single by Bob Marley and the Wailers

Single by Bob Marley and the Wailers

from the album Confrontation
- Released: 1983
- Recorded: 1978
- Genre: Reggae
- Length: 4:17
- Label: Tuff Gong; Island
- Songwriters: Bob Marley & King Sporty

Bob Marley and the Wailers singles chronology
"Reggae on Broadway" (1981)	"Buffalo Soldier" (1983)	"One Love/People Get Ready" (1984)

Music video
- "Buffalo Soldier" on YouTube

"Buffalo Soldier" is a reggae song written by Bob Marley and Noel "King Sporty" Williams and recorded by Jamaican band Bob Marley and the Wailers. It did not appear on record until the 1983 posthumous release of Confrontation, when it became one of Marley's best-known songs. The title and lyrics refer to the black US cavalry regiments, known as "Buffalo Soldiers", that fought in the Native American Wars after 1866. Marley linked their fight to a fight for survival and recasts it as a symbol of black resistance as a whole.

== Background ==
The origin of the term "Buffalo Soldier" is theorized as given to black troops by Native Americans. The name was embraced by the troops, who were well acquainted with "the buffalo's fierce bravery and fighting spirit". The Buffalo Soldier's duties were settling railroad disputes, building telegraph lines, repairing and building forts, and otherwise helping settlers colonize lands taken from Native Americans. They were also tasked with protecting the colonizing settlers from Native Americans.

The song's bridge, with the lyrics woe! yoe! yo!, was rumoured to be inspired by the chorus from The Banana Splits' "The Tra-La-La Song", the 1968 theme from their TV show, written by Mark Barkan and Ritchie Adams. There has been no proof of this, and an August 2008 story by the BBC seems to cast doubts on this origin story while acknowledging that the two riffs are extremely similar and that Marley could very well have heard the tune, as could his producer.

== Reception ==
Cash Box said that the song's "socio-political theme, steady rhythmic stream and strong but sweet vocals re-emphasize what Marley's magic was all about."

Activist Dick Gregory criticised Marley for the song as early as 1979 when meeting him ahead of their joint appearance at the Amandla Festival, stating that it conveyed a false image of the soldiers, who were responsible for the starvation of indigenous people. Marley had allegedly not been aware of these circumstances when writing the song.

Marley recorded a demo version in 1978 at the earliest, so Gregory must have known the demo. Even at the time of its release in 1983, little was known about the soldiers, yet the song aroused a great deal of interest and research and contributed to a differentiated reception.

== Music video ==
A music video was produced for "Buffalo Soldier" to promote the single. The video depicts Marley and friends dressed as Union Army Buffalo Soldiers while running through a forest, drinking water from a river and firing a cannon during the American Civil War; interspersed is video footage of them producing the song in the recording studio.

== Charts ==
Chart	Peak position
Australia (Kent Music Report)	18
Austria (Ö3 Austria Top 40)	14
Finland (Suomen virallinen lista)	29
New Zealand (RIANZ)	3
Norway (VG-lista)	10
UK Singles (OCC)	4

== Certifications ==
Region	Certification	Certified units/sales
Italy (FIMI)	Gold	25,000^{‡}
New Zealand (RMNZ)	4× Platinum	120,000^{‡}
Spain (Promusicae)	Gold	30,000^{‡}
United Kingdom (BPI)	Platinum	600,000^{‡}
^{‡} Sales+streaming figures based on certification alone.

== In popular culture ==
This song was later remade in 1997 in Tamil as "Akila Akila" for the film Nerrukku Ner (1997).

== See also ==
- List of anti-war songs
