= Alvin "Seeco" Patterson =

Jamaican percussionist (1930–2021)

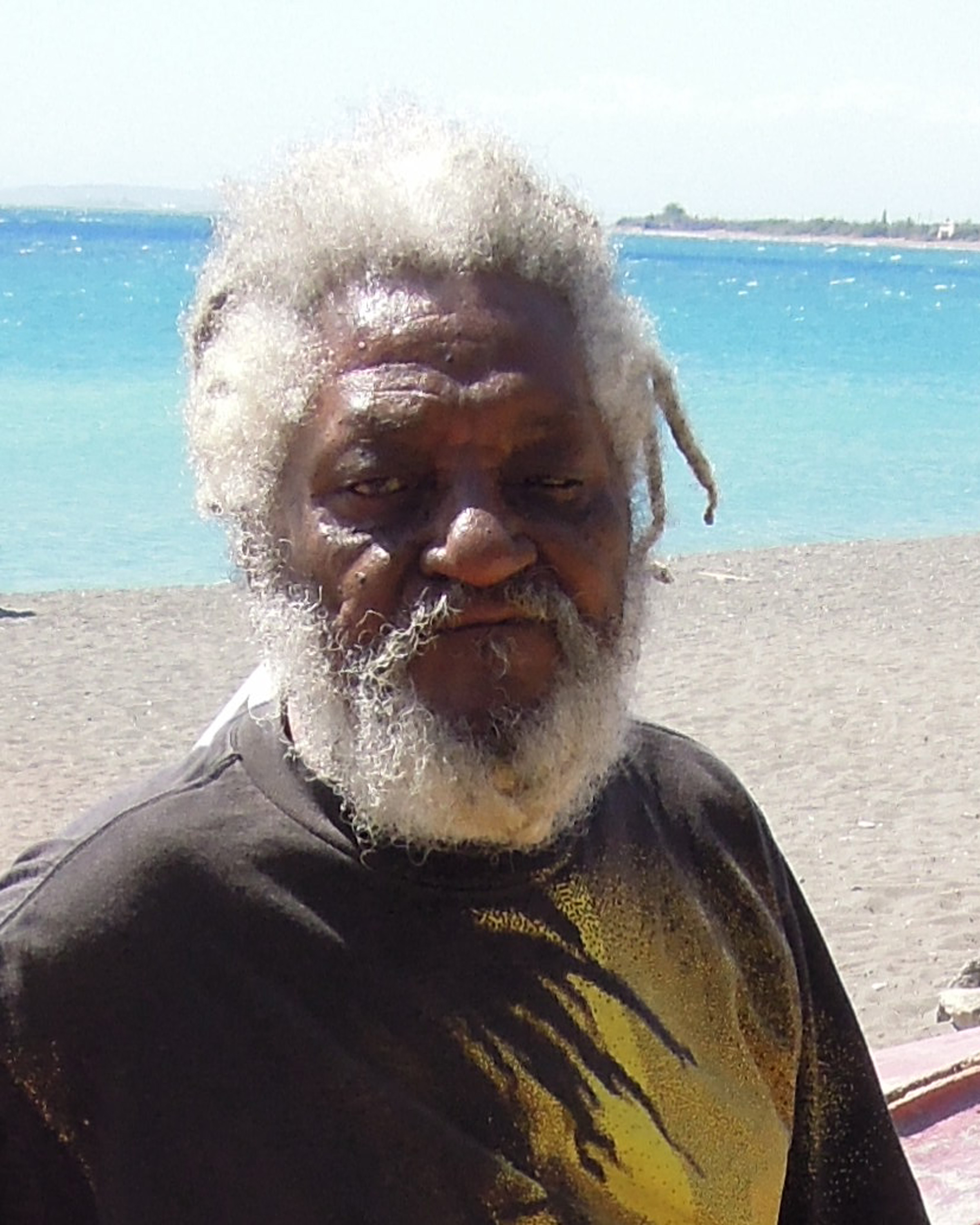

Background information
- Also known as: Seeco, Pep, Willie Pep
- Born: Francisco Aloysius Willie; 30 December 1930; Havana, Cuba
- Died: 1 November 2021 (aged 90) Kingston, Jamaica
- Genre: Reggae
- Occupation: Percussionist
- Instrument: Percussion
- Years active: c.1960–2020

Alvin "Seeco" Patterson (born Francisco Aloysius Willie, 30 December 1930 – 1 November 2021) was a Cuban-born Jamaican percussionist. He was a member of The Wailers Band.

== Early life ==
Patterson was born as Francisco Willie in Havana, Cuba in December 1930, to a Jamaican father whom he seldom saw, and a Panamanian mother named Celestina Hardin. He took Alvin Patterson as a stage name, and acquired the nickname "Seeco" as a bastardisation of his birth name Francisco. He was also referred to at times as "Pep", a nickname he had earned at school. As a child, Patterson emigrated to Jamaica with his parents, and lived first in Westmorland, where his father farmed, but then moved on to Kingston with his mother, after his parents' marriage dissolved. As a young man, Patterson found work as a bauxite miner. In 1957, Patterson attempted to emigrate to the United States in search of better work. In the midst of his move, however, the Kendal train crash occurred in Jamaica on 1 September, prompting Patterson to return to the island to seek out relatives he feared might have been among the nearly 200 dead and 700 injured.

== The Wailers ==
Patterson encouraged Marley as he began to experiment with singing, as Patterson himself had gained experience in the musical realm playing percussion with famed calypso artist Lord Flea, and with other mento-calypso combos. And it was Patterson who would first take the newly formed Wailers group, consisting of Marley, along with Peter Tosh and Bunny Livingston, at Coxsone Dodd's Studio One for their first audition, in July 1964. The resulting recording session, which took place only after Coxsone's initial rejection of the Wailers, produced the hit single "Simmer Down", the record which launched Marley's career.

As the Wailers rose in prominence on the Jamaican scene, Patterson worked in the Bauxite mines. In 1966, however, while Marley was working in the United States, Patterson was injured in a mine accident, when the gas line running under the canteen floor ruptured, causing an explosion that left a number of miners seriously injured. He was thrown from the room and lost his shoes in the process. When Marley returned to the island some weeks later, he convinced Patterson to give up mining, and to begin working in music more regularly. As a result, Patterson began to contribute percussion tracks to a number of Wailers cuts. His first known contribution was on the June 1967 session which produced "Lyrical Satyrical I" and "This Train", and was released on the Wailers' own Wail N Soul M label.

While Patterson's role in the original Wailers (that featured Tosh and Livingston) was small, his contributions gradually increased. When the original Wailers went on their first and only tour of the U.K. in 1973, Patterson acted as roadie. When Marley’s association with Tosh and Livingston ended that year, however, Patterson became a core member of the newly formed Wailers band under Marley’s direction, and contributed to every recording and live performance that Marley would make for the rest of his career. In December 1976, Patterson was rehearsing with Marley at 56 Hope Road when gunmen opened fire on the group, injuring Marley, wife Rita, and manager Don Taylor. In September 1980, Patterson was with Marley when he collapsed jogging in Central Park, and remained with Marley through his cancer treatment both in New York and then at the clinic of Dr. Josef Issels in Rottach-Egern, Germany. Following Marley's death, Patterson continued to play with the Wailers band.

== Later life and death ==
In 1990, Patterson suffered a near-fatal brain haemorrhage, leading to his partial retirement from the music scene. Patterson died on 1 November 2021 at the age of 90, at University Hospital in Kingston. It was stated that Patterson died in his sleep, after developing bleeding on the brain. He is buried in May Pen Cemetery.
