= Bob Marley and the Wailers =

Jamaican reggae band (1963–1981)

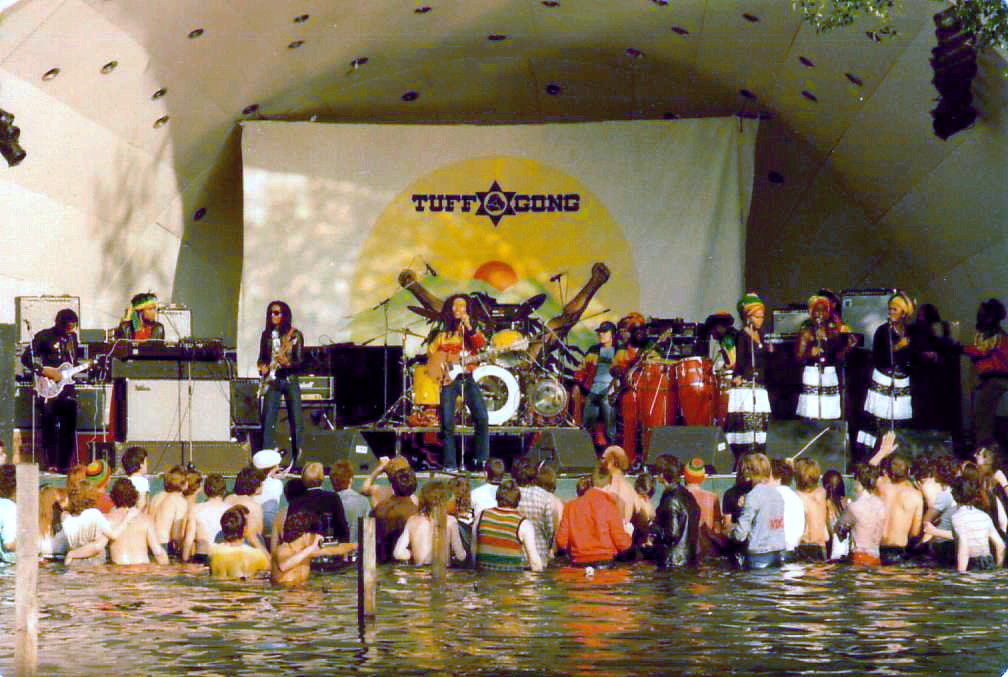
- Bob Marley and the Wailers performing in 1980

Background information
- Also known as: Bob Marley & the Wailers; The Teenagers; The Wailing Rudeboys; The Wailing Wailers; The Wailers
- Origin: Kingston, Jamaica
- Genres: Roots reggae; ska; rocksteady; R&B
- Works: Bob Marley and the Wailers discography
- Years active: 1963–1981
- Labels: Studio One; Wail'n Soul'm; Tuff Gong; Beverley's; Upsetter; Island; JAD
- Spinoffs: Word, Sound and Power; The Wailers Band; The Original Wailers
- Spinoff of: The Upsetters
- Past members: Bob Marley; Peter Tosh; Bunny Wailer; Junior Braithwaite; Cherry Smith; Beverley Kelso; Constantine "Vision" Walker; Aston "Family Man" Barrett; Carlton Barrett; Earl Lindo; Tyrone Downie; Rita Marley; Marcia Griffiths; Judy Mowatt; Al Anderson; Seeco Patterson; Earl "Chinna" Smith; Donald Kinsey; Junior Marvin; Nathaniel Ian Wynter; Jackie Mittoo; Lloyd Knibb; Hux Brown; Brian Atkinson; Clinton Joe Isaacs
- Website: bobmarley.com

Bob Marley and the Wailers (previously known as the Wailers and prior to that the Wailing Rudeboys, the Wailing Wailers and the Teenagers) were a Jamaican ska, rocksteady and reggae band. The founding members, in 1963, were Bob Marley (Robert Nesta Marley), Peter Tosh (Winston Hubert McIntosh), and Bunny Wailer (Neville Livingston).

During 1970 and 1971, Marley, Tosh and Wailer worked with producers Leslie Kong and Lee "Scratch" Perry, recording The Best of the Wailers with Kong and Soul Rebels and Soul Revolution Part II with Perry and the Upsetters.

Before signing to Island Records in 1972, the band released four albums. Two additional albums were produced before Tosh and Wailer departed from the band in 1974, citing dissatisfaction with their treatment by the label and ideological disagreements. Marley continued with a new lineup, which included the I-Threes, and went on to release seven more albums. Marley died from cancer in 1981, at which point the group disbanded.

The Wailers were a groundbreaking ska and reggae group, noted for songs such as "Simmer Down", "Trenchtown Rock", "Nice Time", "War", "Stir It Up", "Get Up, Stand Up" and "I Shot the Sheriff".

== History ==
=== Early years ===
The band formed in 1963 following self-taught musician Peter Tosh (1944–1987) meeting the singers Bunny Wailer (1947–2021) and Bob Marley (1945–1981). They developed a ska vocal group called the Teenagers. The group soon changed their name to the Wailing Rudeboys and then to the Wailing Wailers before settling on the Wailers.

The band topped the Jamaican charts in 1964 with "Simmer Down", which was recorded at Studio One with the rhythm section from the studio house band the Skatalites. "Simmer Down" was a message to the Jamaican rude boys to "simmer down, oh cool your temper" and became an overnight hit. The record played an essential role in changing the musical agenda in Jamaica from imitating foreign artists, to capturing the lives and spirit of Jamaica.

By late 1963, singers Junior Braithwaite, Beverley Kelso, and Cherry Smith had joined the group. The line-up consisted of Braithwaite on vocals, Marley on guitar, Tosh on keyboard, Wailer on percussion, with Smith and or Kelso on backing vocals. Kelso remembered those early recordings fondly:

After we rehearsed, under this big mango tree on Second Street in Trench Town, the next morning, I think it was in late 1963, we went to Studio 1 and recorded Simmer Down and some other songs. It was Peter, Bunny, Junior, Bob, and me. I will never forget. Sid Bucknor was the engineer, and Coxsone was also there along with Roland and Jackie Mittoo. We recorded Simmer Down about 10 times, probably because Dodd wanted to get the best cut, she said.

In 1965, Kelso left the band. Marley, Tosh, Wailer and Braithwaite took turns on lead vocals. Braithwaite left shortly after providing lead vocals for the single "It Hurts to be Alone", leaving the band consisting of the trio of Wailer, Marley and Tosh. The band's first album, The Wailing Wailers, was released the same year, a compilation of tracks recorded at different times.

In May 1970, the band recorded with reggae producer Leslie Kong, producing The Best of the Wailers, which was released in 1971. Bob Marley approached Lee "Scratch" Perry about working with the group, although Perry was initially reluctant to collaborate. Following the commercial and creative success of his late-1960s Upsetter singles, Perry had largely lost interest in working with singers and concentrated on instrumental recordings, sometimes using vocalists only for versions issued on their B-sides. The encounter led Perry to reconsider his reluctance to work with singers. The Wailers subsequently worked with Perry and his studio band the Upsetters through 1971, producing the albums Soul Rebels (1970) and Soul Revolution Part II (1971).

During their collaboration, Perry and members of the Wailers sometimes travelled around Kingston and the surrounding countryside, drawing on incidents they encountered as material for songs before returning to the studio to record them. The sessions took place at Randy's Recording Studio, where Errol Thompson engineered the recordings, working with Perry at the mixing board and applying effects including reverb and delay. During this period, Upsetters members Aston "Family Man" Barrett (bass) and Carlton Barrett (drums) were recruited as instrumental backing for the Wailers.

The recordings also influenced other Jamaican musicians. Singer Dave Barker later recalled that many musicians wanted to address their own lives and spiritual beliefs in their music but that such material had previously found little acceptance in Jamaica. He credited the Wailers and Perry with helping to open the way for other artists to pursue this approach.

Perry and the Wailers ended their collaboration soon afterward. "Small Axe" and "Duppy Conqueror" reached the top five in Jamaica in 1970 and 1971, respectively. In 1971, Marley produced "Trenchtown Rock" at Harry J's studio, which became Jamaica's best-selling single of the year.

=== Signing to Island Records ===
In 1972, while in London, the Wailers asked their road manager Brent Clarke to introduce them to Chris Blackwell, who had licensed some of their Coxsone releases for his Island Records. The Wailers felt they were due royalties from these releases. Blackwell was not convinced, but he was impressed by their character. He thought they "exuded power and self-possession" despite being poor. Despite not having seen the band perform live, he advanced them £4,000 to record an album. He did not even require them to sign anything, feeling they deserved a break. Jimmy Cliff, Island's top reggae star, had recently left the label. His departure may have primed Blackwell to find a replacement. In Marley, Blackwell recognized the elements needed to snare the rock audience: "I was dealing with rock music, which was really rebel music. I felt that would really be the way to break Jamaican music. But you needed someone who could be that image. When Bob walked in, he really was that image". The Wailers returned to Jamaica to record at Harry J's in Kingston, which resulted in the foundational tracks what would make up the album Catch a Fire. Primarily recorded on an eight-track, Catch a Fire marked the first time a reggae band had access to a state-of-the-art studio and were accorded the same care as their rock 'n' roll peers.

The tracks were taken to Island Studios in London and worked on by Blackwell, with Marley supervising. Blackwell desired the tracks to appeal to rock audiences in the United Kingdom and United States, to whom the band would be novel. To this end, he made the tracks sound "more of a drifting, hypnotic-type feel than a reggae rhythm". He restructured Marley's mixes and arrangements. The tracks were overdubbed with the help of Wayne Perkins on guitar and John "Rabbit" Bundrick on keyboard. The mix deviated from the bass-heavy sound of Jamaican music, and two tracks were omitted. The album released in April 1973, closely followed by Burnin' in October 1973. Burnin' contained the songs "Get Up, Stand Up" (credited to Tosh and Marley) and Marley's "I Shot the Sheriff"; a cover version of the latter was Eric Clapton's first US No. 1 in 1974.

=== Tosh and Livingston departure and I-Threes ===
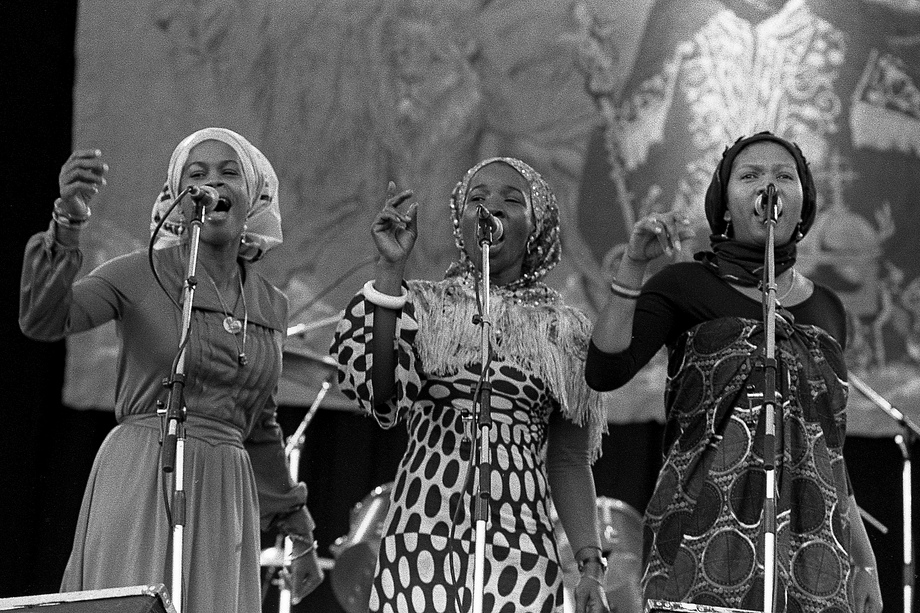
The I-Threes from left to right: Judy Mowatt, Rita Marley, and Marcia Griffiths

In 1974, Livingston left the band due to various disagreements with Blackwell, including not getting paid for the English leg of their Burnin' tour, and his refusal to play in the "freak clubs" that Island had booked the band. Tosh believed that producer Blackwell, whom he unfavorably called "Chris Whiteworst", was responsible for the bad relationship between the band members. He thought Blackwell favored Marley over the rest of the band, giving him more attention and money, and with the decision to release their albums under the name "Bob Marley and the Wailers" instead of "The Wailers".

Marley continued with a new line-up, which included Aston Barrett (bass), Carlton Barrett (drums), Junior Marvin (lead guitar), Al Anderson (lead guitar), Tyrone Downie (keyboards), Earl "Wya" Lindo (keyboards), and Alvin "Seeco" Patterson on percussion. Additionally, the I-Threes provided female backing vocals. The three I-Three members were Marley's wife Rita Marley, Judy Mowatt and Marcia Griffiths. Their name is a spin on the Rastafarian "I and I" concept of the Godhead within each person.

The album Natty Dread was released in 1974, the first without Tosh and Livingston and with the I-Threes. It featured "No Woman, No Cry", a seminal song in the Wailers' canon, along with "Lively Up Yourself" and the more political "Them Belly Full (But We Hungry)". In 1975 a live version of "No Woman, No Cry", recorded at the Lyceum Theatre in London during the Natty Dread tour, became Bob Marley & the Wailers' first successful single outside reggae circles, reaching No. 22 on the UK singles chart.

Perry released two compilation albums for Trojan Records in 1974, Rasta Revolution and African Herbsman, which contained songs from Soul Rebels and Soul Revolution Part II, respectively, and he was the copyright holder of several songs from these albums. These changes caused a major dispute between Marley and Perry, when the former saw the albums, six months after their publication, in the Half Way Road in England.

Bob Marley & the Wailers' next album, 1976's Rastaman Vibration, was a breakthrough success in the US, reaching No. 8 on the Billboard 200 chart. The song "War" featured lyrics taken directly from the text of a Haile Selassie speech. The album credits numerous songwriters, including Bob and Rita Marley, the Barretts and Marley's childhood mentor and friend Vincent Ford amongst others. Marley was in dispute with publishing company Cayman Music and sought to avoid contractual entanglements by putting the songs in the names of his family and friends, and provide them with potential future income.

Also in 1976, Bunny Wailer (Livingston) released his debut solo album Blackheart Man, with Marley and Tosh contributing backing vocals and the Barretts forming the rhythm section on some tracks. Peter Tosh also released his first solo album entitled Legalize It. Marley and Livingston received co-writing credits on some of the songs. Most of the then-current Wailers band (the Barretts, Anderson, Downie) played on the record, with Rita Marley providing backing vocals.

=== Stay in London and Exodus ===
Following an assassination attempt at their home in Kingston in December 1976, the Marleys moved to London, England in early 1977. Most of the current Wailers line-up followed, with Marley also recruiting Jamaican-born, London-raised guitarist Junior Marvin. This line-up recorded the next Bob Marley & the Wailers album, Exodus, released in June, 1977. The album title (and title track) were conceived in response to Jamaican Prime Minister Michael Manley's campaign slogan, 'We Know Where We're Going'. Featuring downbeat reggae rhythms fused with elements of soul, blues and English rock, Exodus was a top-20 hit in the US and UK while the song "Exodus" was No. 1 in Jamaica. Exodus also featured numerous songs which would go on to be hits and iconic Bob Marley & the Wailers tunes in their own right, including "Jamming", "Waiting In Vain", a new version of 1965's "One Love/People Get Ready" and the carefree, optimistic "Three Little Birds". In 1999, Time magazine named Exodus the greatest album of the 20th century, and the album has continued to feature in best-of-all-time lists.

In March 1978 the album Kaya was released. The record was coolly received by critics, who found it lightweight and uninspired following Exodus. Nevertheless, Kaya went top-5 in the UK Albums Chart and contained the hit single "Is This Love". Kaya also contained new versions of three songs from 1971's Soul Revolution II. Bob Marley & the Wailers toured Europe extensively in support of Kaya, resulting in the live album Babylon by Bus, also released in 1978.

=== Return to Jamaica and later years ===
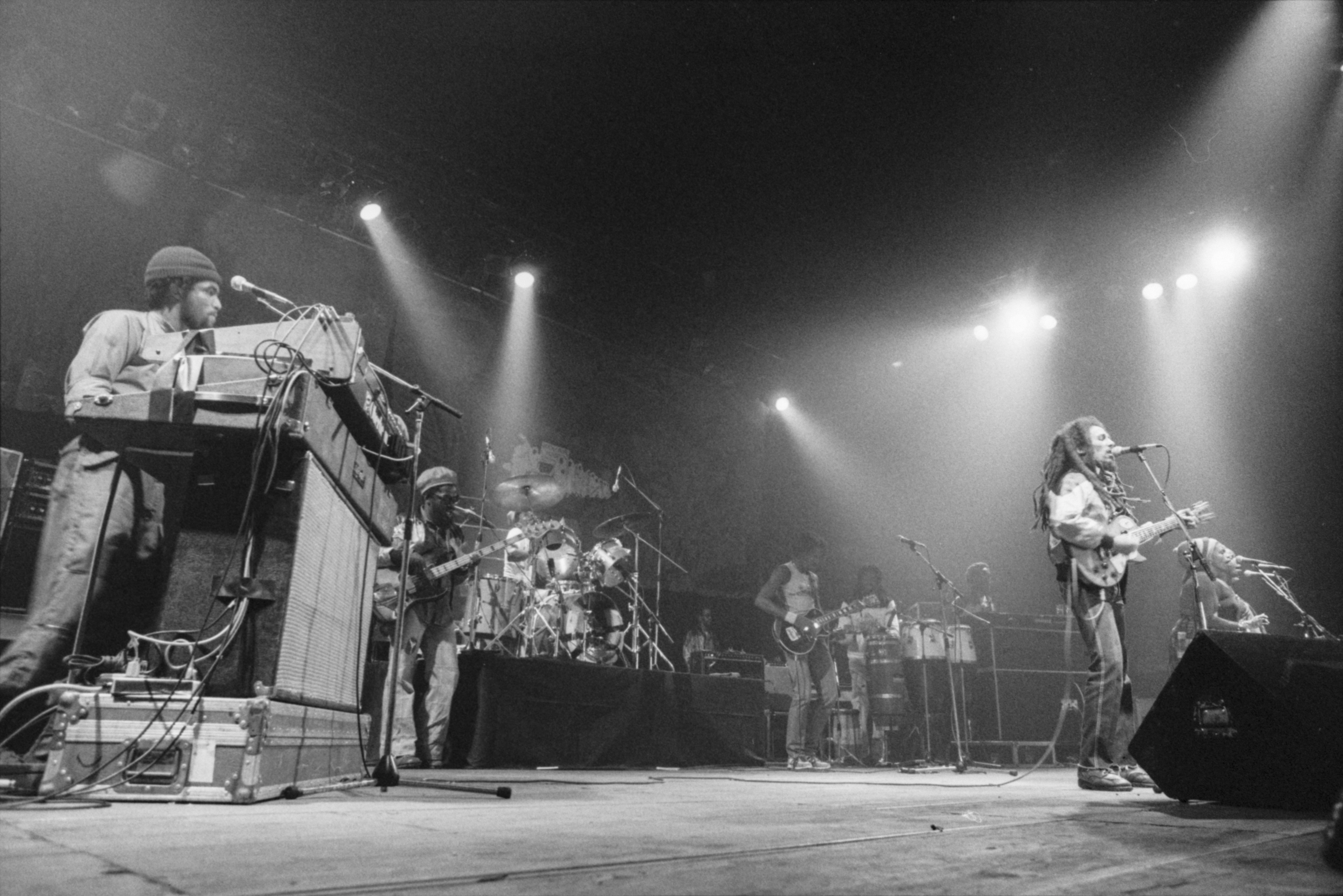
Bob Marley and the Wailers performing in Zurich, 1980

Marley and the Wailers returned to Jamaica in April 1978 to play the One Love Peace Concert in Kingston, aimed at calming political tensions and violence in their home country. Near the end of the concert Marley joined hands on stage with Manley and opposition leader Edward Seaga.

Bob Marley had a lifelong interest in Africa, having visited Ethiopia briefly in 1978. Themes of African independence and pan-African unity dominated 1979's overtly political album Survival. Songs including "Africa Unite", "Zimbabwe" and "Wake Up and Live" made Marley's feelings plain, while the single "One Drop" employed a double-meaning of the reggae rhythm used in the song and a system of racial classification used in the US. In 1980, Bob Marley (absent Wailers) was invited to perform "Zimbabwe" at the country's Independence Day celebrations.

In 1977, following persistent pain in his right big toe, Bob Marley had been diagnosed with acral lentiginous melanoma, a rare form of skin cancer. Doctors recommended amputation of the toe, but Marley refused for religious reasons; he also feared it would hinder stage performance. Bob Marley & the Wailers pressed on, planning extensive worldwide tours.

The last Bob Marley & the Wailers' album released in Marley's lifetime, Uprising, appeared in June 1980. An assertive affirmation of Marley's Rastafarian beliefs, the album contained the song "Forever Loving Jah"; the solo acoustic, folk-based "Redemption Song", believed by some to be Marley's finest song; and the successful single "Could You Be Loved".

The band embarked on a US tour to promote the album. One of the last performances that included Marley was in 1980 at Madison Square Garden. His final live show was performed at the Stanley Theater in Pittsburgh. By September 1980, Marley could no longer perform live. He sought alternative cancer treatments in Europe before attempting to return home to Jamaica. Marley's condition worsened on the flight and he died in a Miami hospital on May 11, 1981.

=== Post Bob Marley death ===
A Bob Marley & the Wailers album, Confrontation, was released in May 1983, two years after Bob Marley's death. It contained unreleased and demo songs recorded during Marley's lifetime. Backing vocals by the I-Threes were added to several of the songs to give the album some consistency. "Buffalo Soldier", a single released from the album, was a top-10 hit in the UK.

The music of Marley, Tosh and Wailer enjoyed considerable success as reggae music continued to gain popularity during the 1980s. In 1984 Island Records released a Bob Marley & the Wailers 'greatest hits' album, entitled Legend. The album contains all ten of the Wailers' top-40 UK hits, plus "Redemption Song" and three songs from the Marley/Tosh/Livingston era, "Stir It Up", "Get Up, Stand Up" and "I Shot the Sheriff". Legend went to No. 1 on the UK Albums Chart and peaked at No. 5 in the US, but it has stayed in the Billboard 200 and UK top 100 since release. It is officially the biggest-selling reggae album ever, with an estimated 28 million copies sold globally (as of 2024).

Carlton Barrett and Tosh died —both of them murdered— in 1987. Braithwaite was murdered in 1999.

The Wailers Band was formed by Aston Barrett in 1989. The Original Wailers was instead formed by Anderson and Marvin in 2008, the same year in which Cherry Smith died.

The rest of the original members of the band died within a few years of each other: Earl Lindo died in 2017, and both Alvin "Seeco" Patterson and Bunny Wailer (Livingston) died in 2021. Keyboardist Tyrone Downie died in 2022, and Aston Barrett died in February 2024. Donald Kinsey died in February 2024, on Bob Marley's birthday, February 6, three days after the loss of Aston Barrett.

=== Legacy ===
In 2001, Catch a Fire was reissued as a double album, with the first part being the previously unreleased 'Jamaican' versions of the song without Blackwell's overdubs and the second part being the album as it was released in 1972.

In March 2013, an overview of most of the music made by the Wailers prior to their signing to Island Records was published by the Roots Reggae Library.

== Band members ==
- Bob Marley – rhythm guitar, lead vocals (1963–1981; died 1981)
- Peter Tosh – lead guitar, keyboard, vocals (1963–1974; died 1987)
- Bunny Wailer – percussion, vocals (1963–1974; died 2021)
- Cherry Smith – backing vocals (1963–1966; died 2008)
- Beverley Kelso – backing vocals (1963–1965)
- Junior Braithwaite – vocals (1963–1964; died 1999)
- Constantine "Vision" Walker – backing vocals (1966–1967)
- Aston "Family Man" Barrett – bass (1970–1981; died 2024)
- Carlton Barrett – drums, percussion (1970–1981; died 1987)
- Earl Lindo – keyboards (1973, 1978–1981; died 2017)
- Tyrone Downie – keyboards, percussion, backing vocals (1974–1981; died 2022)
- Rita Marley – backing vocals (1974–1981)
- Marcia Griffiths – backing vocals (1974–1981)
- Judy Mowatt – backing vocals (1974–1981)
- Al Anderson – guitar (1974–1975, 1978–1981)
- Seeco Patterson – percussion (1975–1981; died 2021)
- Earl "Chinna" Smith – guitar (1975–1976)
- Donald Kinsey – guitar (1975–1976, died 2024)
- Junior Marvin – guitar, backing vocals (1977–1981)
- Brian Atkinson – bass (1965–1967)
- Clinton Joe Isaacs – drums (1966–1967)
- Jackie Mittoo – keys, music director (1963–1967; died 1990)

== Discography ==
"Simmer Down"
A sample of the band's 1964 single "Simmer Down".

- The Wailing Wailers (1965)
- The Best of the Wailers (1970; released 1971)
- Soul Rebels (1970)
- Soul Revolution Part II (1971)
- Catch a Fire (1973)
- Burnin' (1973)
- Natty Dread (1974)
- Rastaman Vibration (1976)
- Exodus (1977)
- Kaya (1978)
- Survival (1979)
- Uprising (1980)
- Confrontation (1983)

== Tours ==
- Apr–Jul 1973: Catch a Fire Tour (England, US)
- Oct–Nov 1973: Burnin' Tour (US, England)
- Jun–Jul 1975: Natty Dread Tour (US, Canada, England)
- Apr–Jun 1976: Rastaman Vibration Tour (US, Canada, Germany, Sweden, Netherlands, France, England, Wales)
- May–Jun 1977: Exodus Tour (France, Belgium, Netherlands, Germany, Sweden, Denmark, England)
- May–Aug 1978: Kaya Tour (US, Canada, England, France, Spain, Sweden, Denmark, Norway, Netherlands, Belgium)
- Apr–May 1979: Babylon by Bus Tour (Japan, New Zealand, Australia, Hawaii)
- Oct 1979–Jan 1980: Survival Tour (US, Canada, Trinidad/Tobago, Bahamas, Gabon)
- May–Sep 1980: Uprising Tour (Switzerland, Germany, France, England, Norway, Sweden, Denmark, Belgium, Netherlands, Italy, Spain, Ireland, Scotland, Wales, US)

== See also ==
- The Upsetters
- Word, Sound and Power
- The Wailers Band
- The Original Wailers
