= Wailin' for Love =

Studio album by Junior Marvin
- Released: 2007
- Genres: Reggae, Rock, R&B
- Label: Junior Marvin Music
- Producer: Junior Marvin

Junior Marvin chronology
| My Friends (1997) | Wailin' for Love (2007) |

Wailin' for Love is an album by Junior Marvin which was released in 2007.

== Track listing ==
| No. | Title | Writer(s) | Length |
|---|---|---|---|
| 1. | "Life Without You" | Junior Marvin | 4:19 |
| 2. | "Burnin' Love" | Junior Marvin | 4:14 |
| 3. | "Supernatural" | Junior Marvin, Noel Williams | 3:08 |
| 4. | "People" | Junior Marvin | 4:13 |
| 5. | "Our Day (Happy Family)" | Junior Marvin | 3:45 |
| 6. | "Children" | Junior Marvin | 3:53 |
| 7. | "Redemption Song" | Bob Marley | 5:10 |
| 8. | "Preacher Man" | Junior Marvin | 4:13 |
| 9. | "Fight Them Back (with Love)" | Junior Marvin, Wayne Jobson | 3:53 |
| 10. | "Let Me Tell You Something" | Junior Marvin | 3:50 |
| 11. | "It's Alright" | Junior Marvin | 4:01 |
| 12. | "What A Feeling" | Junior Marvin | 4:02 |
| 13. | "Some Say" | Junior Marvin | 4:19 |
| 14. | "Totally Awesome" | Junior Marvin | 4:25 |
| 15. | "Rock Steady" | Junior Marvin, Roger Mayer | 3:48 |
| 16. | "Want To Hold You" | Junior Marvin | 4:09 |
| 17. | "Love, Love, Love Today" | Junior Marvin | 3:27 |
| 18. | "Supernatural (The Remix)" | Junior Marvin | 4:11 |
| Total length: | | | 01:08:41 |

== Personnel ==
- Junior Marvin - Lead Vocals, Lead Guitar, Bass Guitar, Keyboard, Producer
- Aston Barrett - Bass Guitar
- Marcelo Nassar - Bass Guitar
- Bugs - Bass Guitar
- Sly Dunbar - Drums
- Trevor Morell - Drums
- Carlton Barrett - Drums
- Mauricio Nassar - Drums
- Georges Kouakou - Keyboard
- Tyrone Downie - Keyboard
- Earl Wya Lindo - Keyboard
- Fernando DeJesus - Keyboard
- Leroy Romans - Keyboard
- Christopher Drummond - Strings
- Cynthia Guinn - Backing Vocals
- Rita Norman - Backing Vocals
- Ronnie Quaries - Backing Vocals
- Drew Hawkins - Cover Art
- Matthew Thibodeau - Tour Coordinator
- Ron Lebow - Legal
- David Baumann - Legal
- Jim Fox - Engineer
- Christopher Drummond - Engineer
