= I.D. (album) =

Studio album by the Wailers Band
- Released: 1989
- Studio: Marathon (New York City), Dynamic Sound (Kingston, Jamaica)
- Genre: Reggae
- Label: Atlantic
- Producer: The Wailers Band

The Wailers Band chronology
I.D. (1989)	Majestic Warriors (1991)

I.D. is an album by the Jamaican band the Wailers Band, released in 1989. Most of the songs were written by Junior Marvin; the band had around 300 songs to consider.

The album was nominated for a Grammy Award, in the "Best Reggae Recording" category. The band supported the album with a North American tour.

== Critical reception ==
Professional ratings
Review scores
Source	Rating
Chicago Tribune	1.5/4 stars
Los Angeles Times	1.5/5 stars

The Los Angeles Times wrote that the songs "steer a nondescript commercial course that echoes Steel Pulse and UB40." The Chicago Tribune dismissed the album as "a dismaying collection of disco-reggae that, despite its title, remains determinedly faceless." The Times-Picayune noted the "commercial sound" and "heavy rock 'n' roll influence."

== Track listing ==
1. "Solution" (Junior Marvin, Aston Barrett)
2. "Children of the World" (Junior Marvin)
3. "Reggae Love" (Junior Marvin)
4. "Irie" (Junior Marvin, Aston Barrett)
5. "Love Is Forever" (Junior Marvin)
6. "Chasing Tomorrow" (Al Anderson)
7. "Rice and Peas" (Junior Marvin)
8. "Love One Another" (Junior Marvin)
9. "Life Goes On" (Junior Marvin, Irving "Carrott" Jarrett)
10. "Have Faith in Jah" (Junior Marvin)
11. "One One Coco" (Junior Marvin, Michaux, Smith)
12. "P's and Q's" (Junior Marvin, Aston Barrett)

== Personnel ==
- Aston "Family Man" Barrett: bass, acoustic piano, rhythm guitar, percussion and synthesizer
- Junior Marvin: lead vocals, backing vocals, guitar and synthesizer
- Earl "Wya" Lindo: Hammond B3 organ, synthesizer, backing vocals
- Al Anderson: guitars, vocals,
- Irvin "Carrot" Jarrett: percussion
- Martin Batista: keyboards
- Michael "Boo" Richards: drums and percussion
- Ed Michaux, Desi Smith, Pam Hall, and Erica Newell: backing vocals
- Carlton "Carly" Barrett: Drums
