= Mama Look at Bubu =

Single by Harry Belafonte

from the album The Versatile Mr. Belafonte
- B-side: "Don't Ever Love Me"
- Released: March 1957
- Genre: Calypso
- Length: 2:58
- Label: RCA Victor
- Songwriters: Harry Belafonte, Lord Burgess, Lord Melody

Harry Belafonte singles chronology
"Danny Boy" (1957)	"Mama Look at Bubu" (1957)	"Coconut Woman" (1957)

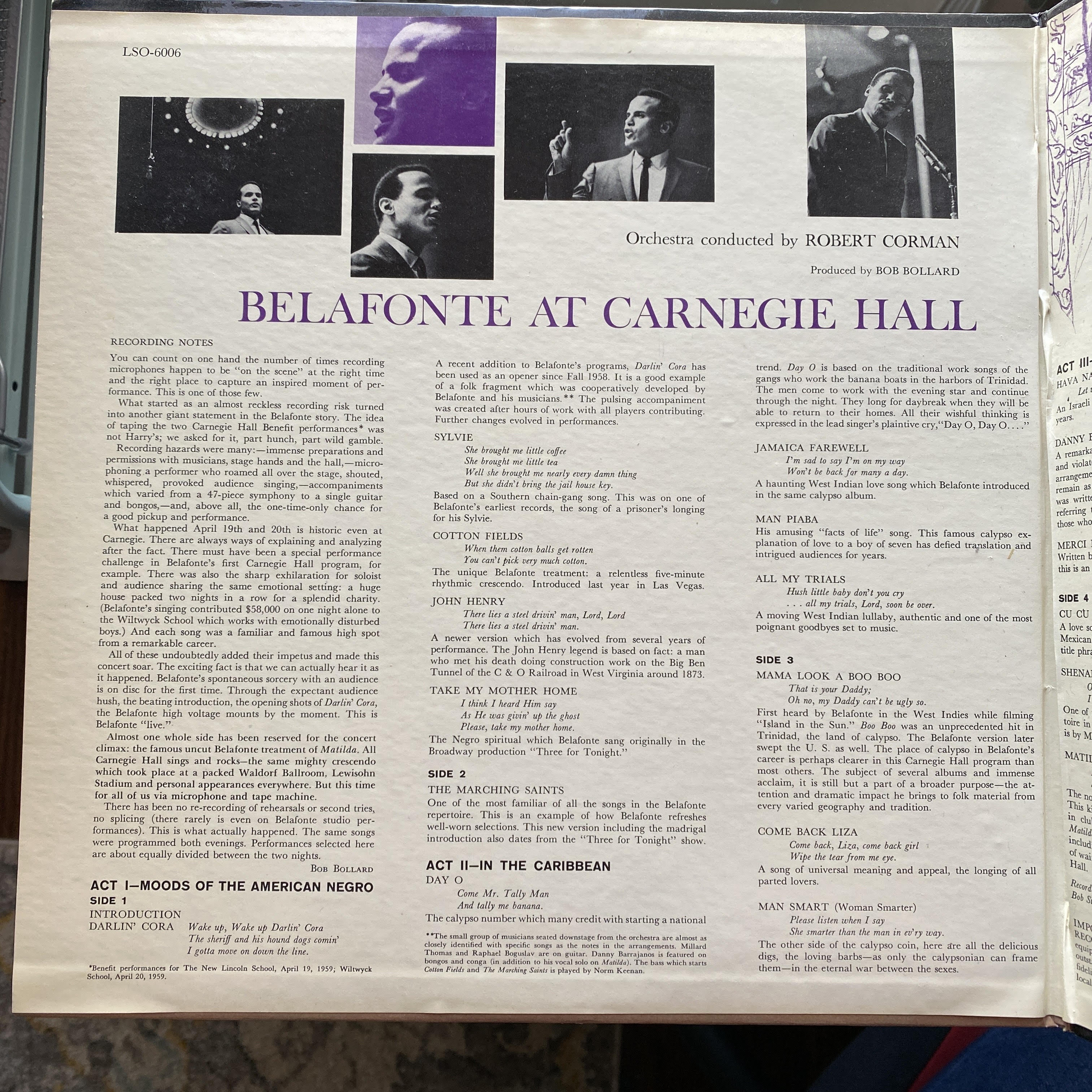
Inside cover of Belafonte at Carnegie Hall LP

"Mama Look at Bubu" (later retitled "Mama Look a Boo Boo") is a song written by the Trinidadian calypsonian Lord Melody, and performed by Harry Belafonte and Bob Corwin's Orchestra & Chorus, featuring Millard Thomas, Frantz Casseus, and Victor Messer on guitar.

Although Belafonte is credited as a co-writer on his 1957 release, the song first appeared on Lord Melody's single "Mama Look a Boo Boo" in 1955 (with slightly different lyrics) and on his debut album Calypso Fiesta – Limbo in Trinidad in 1956 (retitled "Boo Boo"), with solo writing credit to Lord Melody (real name Fitzroy Alexander).

The song was first heard by Belafonte in the West Indies while filming Island in the Sun.

== Reception ==
The song was a hit in Trinidad and in the United States.

Belafonte's cover reached No. 10 on the U.S. R&B chart and No. 11 on the U.S. pop chart in 1957. It was featured on his 1957 album The Versatile Mr. Belafonte.

== Other versions ==
- Steve Karmen released a version of the song entitled "Mama Look-A Boo Boo" as a single in 1957; it did not chart.
- Chubby Checker released a version entitled "Mama Look a Boo Boo" on Let's Limbo Some More (1963).
- Leftover Salmon released a version entitled "Booboo" on Bridges to Bert (1993).
- Charlie Gracie released a version entitled "Mama Look a Boo Boo" on An Evening with Charlie Gracie (2002), which was recorded in 1998.
- A version by Nat King Cole entitled "Mama Look a Boo Boo" was released on his 2003 compilation album Remembering Nat King Cole.
- Karl Zéro released a version of the song on HiFi Calypso (2004).
