= HiFi Calypso =

Studio album by Karl Zéro & The Wailers
- Released: August 30, 2004
- Genre: Calypso
- Length: 45:07 (limited edition); 47:21 (standard edition)
- Label: Naïve Records, La Société Secrète
- Producer: Tyrone Downie, Michaëlle Roch (executive)

Karl Zéro & The Wailers chronology
Songs for Cabriolets y Otros Tipos de Vehiculos (2000)	HiFi Calypso (2004)

HiFi Calypso is the second album by French writer, actor, filmmaker and singer Karl Zéro, backed by the Jamaican reggae band The Wailers.

== Background ==
Karl Zéro's first album, Songs for Cabriolets y Otros Tipos de Vehiculos, was a collection of covers of international pop standards of the 1940s and 1950 (including "Perfidia" and "(I Love You) For Sentimental Reasons"). For his next album, he set his mind on recording calypso songs, and started looking for a reggae band. He then learned that Tyrone Downie, which was a member of Bob Marley and the Wailers, lived in Montpellier. It turned out that Downie used to watch Zéro's weekly TV show, Le Vrai Journal. He agreed to participate, and contacted other members of the band to recruit them to the project.

Zéro wanted to record the album at Tuff Gong, where Bob Marley recorded his music, but Bernard Lavilliers, who previously recorded there, alerted him to the rampant corruption he faced there. That dissuaded Zéro, who started searching for a studio "a little bit tropical", and settled on the Studio du Manoir, in the Southwestern corner of France, which was used by Noir Désir, amongst other French artists.

== Recording ==
The list of songs was selected by Zéro (who prepared a list of 25 songs, including obscure compositions) and the band, who wanted to perform the songs that they knew from their childhood, or that they played when they started performing. The final track list reflects both influences, which includes the French classic "Salade de Fruits" or the obscure Leslie Scott and Irene Williams song "Crazy Like Mad", amongst the calypso classics "Coconut Woman" and "Mama Look at Bubu", both made famous by Harry Belafonte.

== Track listing ==
Limited edition
No.	Title	Writer(s)	Length
1.	"Reggae Merengue"	Karl Zéro / Duke Reid	2:15
2.	"Take Me Back To Jamaica"	The Jolly Boys	4:13
3.	"Coconut Woman"	Harry Belafonte / Irving Burgie	3:18
4.	"Nice Time"	Bob Marley	3:58
5.	"Jump in the Line"	Rafael De Leon / Harry Belafonte / Gabriel Oller / Steve Samuel	3:56
6.	"Crazy Like Mad"	Irene Williams	2:07
7.	"Salade De Fruits"	Noël Roux / Armand Canfora	3:44
8.	"Man Smart"	Harry Belafonte / Jack Segal / Norman Span	2:29
9.	"Jamaica Farewell"	Irving Burgie	4:02
10.	"Don't Touch Me Tomato"	Traditional	2:24
11.	"Le Gars"	Mighty Sparrow / Don Raye	2:48
12.	"Mama Look at Bubu"	Lord Melody	3:27
13.	"Tingalayo / Rastaman Chant" (hidden track)	Traditional	6:26

Limited edition – bonus DVD
No.	Title	Writer(s)	Length
1.	"Making of Documentary" (directed by Daisy D'Errata)		41:44
2.	"Coconut Woman" (karaoke)	Harry Belafonte / Irving Burgie	3:18
3.	"Salade De Fruits" (karaoke)	Noël Roux / Armand Canfora	3:44
4.	"Take Me Back To Jamaica" (karaoke)	The Jolly Boys	4:13
5.	"Jump in the Line" (karaoke)	Rafael De Leon / Harry Belafonte / Gabriel Oller / Steve Samuel	3:56
6.	"Inouis" (video)	Karl Zéro / Xavier Cugat	3;24

Standard edition (2005)
No.	Title	Writer(s)	Length
1.	"Yes I"	Karl Zéro / Tyrone Downie	3:32
2.	"Reggae Merengue"	Karl Zéro / Duke Reid	2:15
3.	"Take Me Back To Jamaica"	The Jolly Boys	4:13
4.	"Coconut Woman"	Harry Belafonte / Irving Burgie	3:18
5.	"Nice Time"	Bob Marley	3:58
6.	"Jump in the Line"	Rafael De Leon / Harry Belafonte / Gabriel Oller / Steve Samuel	3:56
7.	"Crazy Like Mad"	Irene Williams	2:07
8.	"Salade De Fruits"	Noël Roux / Armand Canfora	3:44
9.	"Man Smart"	Harry Belafonte / Jack Segal / Norman Span	2:29
10.	"Jamaica Farewell"	Irving Burgie	4:02
11.	"Don't Touch Me Tomato"	Traditional	2:24
12.	"Le Gars"	Mighty Sparrow / Don Raye	2:48
13.	"Tingalayo"	Traditional	2:01
14.	"Mamadou Mémé"	Nino Ferrer	2:37
15.	"Rastaman Chant"	Traditional	3:57

- "Rastaman Chant" contains excerpts from the historical collection "Afrique, une histoire sonore".

== Personnel ==
=== The Wailers ===
- Tyrone Downie – keyboards
- Al Anderson – guitar
- Family Man – bass
- Glen Da Costa & Vin Gordon – horns

=== Additional musicians ===
- Karl Zéro & Daisy D'Errata – vocals
- Richacha – drums
- Christophe Dutray – additional horns
- Al Anderson, Alexandre Desplat, Daisy D'Errata, Glen Da Costa, Marie-Do & Kali, Tyrone Downie, Vin Gordon – backing vocals
- Nelson Chambers – banjo on "Take Me Back To Jamaica"
- Slim Pesin – additional guitars
- Laurent Laisingué – steel drum
- François Constantin – percussions

=== Production notes ===
- Produced by Tyrone Downie
- Recorded by Bruno De Jarnac, assisted by Yohan Rivernale at Studio Du Manoir
- Additional recording by Olivier Gro at Twin Studio
- Mixed by Bruno Jarnac, assisted by Nicolas Sacco at Twin Studio
- Mastered by Geoff Pesche at the Townhouse
- Artwork by Hrvoje Goluza
