= Raggamuffin Music Festival =

Music festival in Australia and New Zealand

Raggamuffin
- Raggamuffin Music Festival
- Genre: Reggae, Funk, Dub, Hip hop, Soul
- Dates: January/February
- Locations: Australia: Brisbane (2008 - 2011); Melbourne (2008 - 2011); Perth (2008 - 2011); Sydney (2008 - 2011); Adelaide (2011); Byron Bay (2008 - 2009); Hunter Valley (2008 - 2009); New Zealand: Rotorua (2008 - 2017)
- Years active: 2008 - 2017
- Founders: Andrew McManus
- Website: Australian website New Zealand website

Raggamuffin Music Festival (Raggamuffin) was an annual music festival that toured Australia and New Zealand which concluded its first tour in 2008. As of 2010, it has featured fourteen major international reggae acts and thirteen Australasian acts accommodating reggae, funk, dub, hip-hop and soul.

== Line Ups ==
=== 2008 ===
	Rotorua	Sydney	Perth	Melbourne	Brisbane	HunterValley	Byron Bay
UB40	Yes	Yes	Yes	Yes	Yes	Yes	Yes
Maxi Priest	Yes	Yes	Yes	Yes	Yes	Yes	Yes
The Wailers	Yes	Yes	Yes	Yes	Yes	Yes	Yes
Arrested Development	Yes	Yes	Yes	Yes	Yes	Yes	Yes
Katchafire	Yes	Yes	Yes	Yes	Yes	Yes	Yes
The Black Seeds	Yes	No	No	No	No	No	No
The Midnights	Yes	No	No	No	No	No	No
House Of Shem	Yes	No	No	No	No	No	No

=== 2009 ===
	Rotorua	Sydney	Perth	Melbourne	Brisbane	Hunter Valley	Byron Bay
Ziggy Marley	Yes	Yes	Yes	Yes	Yes	Yes	Yes
Eddy Grant	Yes	Yes	Yes	Yes	Yes	Yes	Yes
Ali Campbell	Yes	Yes	Yes	Yes	Yes	Yes	Yes
Shaggy	Yes	Yes	Yes	Yes	Yes	Yes	Yes
Arrested Development	Yes	Yes	Yes	Yes	Yes	Yes	Yes
Inner Circle	Yes	Yes	Yes	Yes	Yes	Yes	Yes
Bonjah	No	Yes	Yes	Yes	Yes	Yes	Yes
Kora	Yes	No	No	No	No	No	No
Unity Pacific	Yes	No	No	No	No	No	No
Three Houses Down	Yes	No	No	No	No	No	No

=== 2010 ===
	Rotorua	Sydney	Perth	Melbourne	Brisbane
Wyclef Jean	Cancelled	Cancelled	Cancelled	Cancelled	Cancelled
Shaggy	Yes	Yes	Yes	Yes	Yes
Lauryn Hill	Yes	Yes	Yes	Yes	Yes
Steel Pulse	Yes	Yes	Yes	Yes	Yes
Sly & Robbie	Yes	Yes	Yes	Yes	Yes
Julian Marley	Yes	Yes	Yes	Yes	Yes
Sean Kingston	Yes	Yes	Yes	Yes	Yes
Blue King Brown	No	Yes	Yes	Yes	Yes
House of Shem	Yes	Yes	Yes	Yes	Yes
Katchafire	Yes	No	No	No	No
Sola Rosa & Iva Lamkum	Yes	No	No	No	No
Sweet & Irie	Yes	No	No	No	No

=== 2011 ===
	Rotorua	Sydney	Perth	Melbourne	Brisbane	Adelaide
Mary J. Blige	Yes	Yes	Yes	Yes	Yes	Yes
Jimmy Cliff	Yes	Yes	Yes	Yes	Yes	Yes
Maxi Priest	Yes	Yes	Yes	Yes	Yes	Yes
Sean Paul	Cancelled	Cancelled	Cancelled	Cancelled	Cancelled	Cancelled
The Original Wailers	Yes	Yes	Yes	Yes	Yes	Yes
Ky-Mani Marley	Yes	Yes	Yes	Yes	Yes	Yes
The Black Seeds	Yes	Yes	Yes	Yes	Yes	Yes
The Red Eyes	Yes	Yes	Yes	Yes	Yes	Yes
Che Fu & The Kratez	Yes	No	No	No	No	No
Nesian Mystik	Yes	No	No	No	No	No
1814	Yes	No	No	No	No	No
Sons of Zion	Yes	No	No	No	No	No

=== 2012 ===
	Rotorua	Sydney	Perth	Melbourne	Brisbane
Ali Campbell's UB40	Yes	Cancelled	Cancelled	Cancelled	Cancelled
Billy Ocean	Yes	Cancelled	Cancelled	Cancelled	Cancelled
Marvin Priest	Yes	Cancelled	Cancelled	Cancelled	Cancelled
Big Mountain	Yes	Cancelled	Cancelled	Cancelled	Cancelled
Junior Marvin	Yes	Cancelled	Cancelled	Cancelled	Cancelled
Nkulee Dube	Yes	Cancelled	Cancelled	Cancelled	Cancelled
Sly & Robbie	Yes	No	No	No	No
Arrested Development	Yes	No	No	No	No
J Boog	Yes	No	No	No	No
Spawnbreezie	Yes	No	No	No	No
Kora	Yes	No	No	No	No
Katchafire	Yes	No	No	No	No
House of Shem	Yes	No	No	No	No
Three Houses Down	Yes	No	No	No	No
Cornerstone Roots	Yes	No	No	No	No
1814	Yes	No	No	No	No
Sweet & Trie	Yes	No	No	No	No
Sons of Zion	Yes	No	No	No	No
Tomorrow People	Yes	No	No	No	No
NRG Rising	Yes	No	No	No	No
Soljah	Yes	No	No	No	No
Foundation	Yes	No	No	No	No
Chad Chambers	Yes	No	No	No	No
DJ Sir-Vere	Yes	No	No	No	No
DJ Poroufessor	Yes	No	No	No	No
DJ Beau Zee	Yes	No	No	No	No

== Compilation albums ==
- Raggamuffin Vol 1 (2008)
- Raggamuffin Vol 2 (2008)
- Raggamuffin Vol 3 (Album)|Raggamuffin Vol 3 (2010)

== See also ==
- List of reggae festivals
- Reggae
