= Majestic Warriors =

Studio album by The Wailers Band
- Released: 1991
- Recorded: Dynamic Studios and The Mixing Lab
- Genre: Reggae
- Label: A&M and Tabu Records
- Producer: Aston Barrett, Gordon Mack, Junior Marvin, The Wailers Band

The Wailers Band chronology
I.D. (1989)	Majestic Warriors (1991)	JAH Message (1994)

Majestic Warriors is a studio album by The Wailers Band.

== Track listing ==
1. "Liberty" (Junior Marvin, Aston Barrett, Michael "Boo" Richards, Earl Fitzsimmons, Andrew McIntyre, Alvin "Seeco" Patterson, Earl "Wire" Lindo)
2. "Trip" (Irving "Carrott" Jarret)
3. "Dancing Boys" (Junior Marvin, Earl Fitzsimmons)
4. "Sweet Cry Freedom" (Andrew McIntyre)
5. "My Friend" (Junior Marvin, Alvin "Seeco" Patterson)
6. "Out of Exile" (Junior Marvin, Carlton "Carly" Barrett)
7. "Showdown" (Aston Barrett, Junior Marvin, Michael "Boo" Richards)
8. "Bad Mind People" (Michael "Boo" Richards, Junior Marvin)
9. "Nothin' for Nothin'" (Junior Marvin)
10. "Live and Love" (Junior Marvin)
11. "Rock On, Be Strong" (Junior Marvin)
12. "Could You Be Loved" (Bob Marley)
