= Patrice Alègre =

French serial killer and serial rapist

- Born: 20 June 1968 (age 58); Toulouse, France
- Convictions: Murder; Rape; Attempted murder
- Penalty: Life imprisonment

Details
- Victims: 5+
- Span of crimes: 1989–1997
- Country: France
- States: Midi-Pyrénées; Île-de-France
- Date apprehended: 5 September 1997

Patrice Alègre (born 20 June 1968) is a French serial killer and serial rapist. In 2002, he was sentenced to life imprisonment for the murders of five and the rape of six women that took place between 1989 and 1997.

In the aftermath of Alègre's capture, the police reopened several unsolved murder cases with possible links to him. During the ensuing investigation, Alègre, and several members of the red light community, claimed to have been part of a sex trafficking ring involving prominent members of society. The incident has been referred to in the French media as the Alègre case (French: L'affaire Alègre).

== Early life ==
Patrice Alègre was born in Toulouse to a police officer and a teenage hairdresser. His father was described as violent and his mother often cheated on her husband, sometimes in front of Alègre. Alègre grew up in Saint-Geniès-Bellevue and was expelled from three secondary schools before he settled on the field of general mechanics. He lived with his grandmother for 14 years in the Izards district of Toulouse. While he lived with her, he dropped out of school after the fourth grade and turned to delinquency, theft, and drug trafficking. He eventually became homeless at the age of 13. He would later tell his psychiatrists that he had been sexually abused. Alègre committed his first sexual assault at age 16. In early 1988, Alègre met Cécile Chambert, with whom he had a daughter the next year.

== Crimes ==
Despite the relative stability of his relationship, Alègre gradually became more immersed in criminal activity. Alègre found his victims in the station's district while he was employed as a barman in the police station cafeteria and then at the Gare de Toulouse-Matabiau's buffet restaurant. When women rejected his advances, he would rape and strangle them. He killed his first victim, Valérie Tariote, a co-worker, on 21 February 1989. On 16 February 1995, after a dispute where Alègre turned violent, Chambert ended her relationship with him and moved away with their daughter. Alègre moved in with his mistress, the manager of a nightclub where he was hired as a bouncer. He was fired from the nightclub after starting fights that scared away customers.

In February 1997, a 21-year-old Emillie Espès managed to flee after being raped by Alègre. Espès, who was the only surviving victim of Alègre, committed suicide in 2006. In June of the same year, Alègre met Mireille Normand, a 35-year-old woman living alone in a chalet in Verdun. Calling himself Franck, he offered his services as a handyman in exchange for lodging. On 19 June, he raped and strangled her. Her body was found buried in her garden three weeks later. Alègre vacationed in Spain, Germany, and Belgium, before returning to Paris where he lodged with Isabelle Chicherie, an SNCF employee. He raped and strangled her, and burned her body on 4 September 1997.

Alègre became a suspect in the murders when some of Chicherie's jewelry was found in his possession. The gendarmes wiretapped the phones of Alègre's relatives and convinced one of his friends to cooperate with the investigators. The friend then asked Alègre to meet him at a drop-off point in Châtenay-Malabry, where the police arrested him on 5 September 1997.

== Alleged links to a sex trafficking network ==
=== Background and police findings ===
In 1999, Alègre alluded to investigators that he had been present during the unsolved murder of the 28-year-old French-Canadian prostitute Line Galbardi. Galbardi had been found murdered at the Hôtel de l'Europe in January 1992, where an unidentified local magistrate was also reported as being present at the crime scene. In June 2000 a special investigative unit, Homicide 31, was established to look into cold murder cases that Alègre may have been responsible for. Homicide 31 discovered patterns typical for Alègre's modus operandi in the murder of Josette Poiroux, who was stabbed to death and burned at her studio in Toulouse in 1992. Another murder that showed similarity to Alègre's crimes was that of Josette Legoy, a prostitute strangled in her apartment on 4 December 1987. Alègre would be indicted for both murders in May 2002. Furthermore, he was accused of murdering Line Galbardi and Patricia Ballejos in 1992, as well as raping a prostitute in 1997. Overall, Homicide 31 looked into 191 unsolved murders in the region that had occurred between 1986 and 1997. In addition, the unit reopened autopsy files classified as suicides in the Haute-Garonne and five other departments.

The police opened a new line of investigation that involved searching for prostitutes that had affiliated with Alègre in the 90s, who had worked as a pimp at the time. This led the police to discover two former prostitutes, Florence "Fanny" Khelifi and Christèle "Patricia" Bourre, who had both worked for Alègre previously. The two claimed that Alègre had acted as a henchman in a sex trafficking ring, and that local police had helped Alègre cover up some of his crimes. Notable members of the ring allegedly included former Toulouse mayor Dominique Baudis as well as former Toulouse deputy prosecutor Marc Bourragué.

=== Witness testimonies ===
Bourre claimed to have witnessed Alègre kill several women, including Line Galbardi, in 1992 while working for him as a madame. Bourre allegedly helped Alègre control other women within the sex trafficking ring while Alègre forwarded them to the "dungeon", a small club where extreme sadomasochistic orgies took place. Some of these sessions allegedly "turned badly" and people died. Bourre claimed to have become acquainted with Marc Bourragué through Alègre in the 90s. She claimed to have been raped by Bourragué during an S&M party, and she later named Baudis as a participant. Bourre claimed that Baudis took part in at least one S&M soirée. She said that on the evening of her 20th birthday, Alègre, Baudis, and another pimp, named Lakhdar Messaoudène, raped her. Bourre also described the murder of a 16-year-old prostitute killed by Alègre and raped at Messaoudène's order because she was not "enough". In December 1991, the girl was reportedly taken to Lake Noah to be "trained" by Alègre. Bourre and Line Galbardi were present. However, the 16-year-old resisted and was subsequently killed. Galbardi allegedly wanted to inform the police about the murder and was killed by Alègre as a result. After witnessing Galbardi's murder, Bourre went into hiding before being tracked down by gendarmes of Homicide 31.

Khelifi claimed to have been forced into prostitution by Alègre at age 17, at a time when Alègre was working in the police station canteen. Khelifi claimed to also have witnessed the murder of Line Galbardi in January 1992 at the Hôtel de l'Europe. She alleged that Messaoudène forced all the other girls to witness the torture of Galbardi while Alègre raped, beat and strangled her. Khelifi proceeded to claim that she was abused by members of Toulouse's justice department and pressured by the police to keep quiet. She had kept quiet about Alègre's involvement until she was tracked down by Homicide 31. Khelifi was then put into contact with Bourre, and they spoke regularly for months. Psychologist Alain Pénin stated that Khelifi's claims were credible, with no hints of fabrication or dramatization.

A prostitute named Pierre-Olivier "Djamel" Puis supported Khelifi and Bourre's accounts, saying that S&M evenings had been organized by Alègre and others. He said that on some occasions people had died. Puis claimed that Claude Martinez, a transvestite who was murdered by Alègre in 1992, filmed the people attending the events. In 2003, Puis stated that a ten-year-old girl named Marion Wagon, who had been reported missing in 1996, had also been present at one of those evenings.

=== Investigation ===
On 15 April 2003, the public prosecutor of Toulouse, Michel Bréard, opened a judicial investigation into "pimping in an organized gang, aggravated rape, and complicity, acts of torture and barbarism" against "Patrice Alègre and all others". Judge Thierry Perriquet was assigned to the case. Attorney general Jean Volff failed to notify the chancellery of the investigation's opening, which led to his being removed from his position. Witnesses would later implicate Volff in the S&M evenings, contending he had willingly taken part.

Marc Bourragué was accused by the witnesses of being a part of the sex trafficking network. According to police reports, a magistrate was present at the scene of Galbardi's murder in 1992 even before the arrival of the police, with several officers claiming that the magistrate in question was Bourragué. Bourragué had initially denied any links to Alègre, even though he had acted as deputy prosecutor in the case of Edith Schleichardt in 1990, in whose death Alègre was a suspect. Bourragué also claimed to have never met Khelifi, although a restauranter who had formerly employed her claimed to have seen the two together. Bourragué later admitted to having had an aperitif at Alègre's home in 1991 or 1992 but denied all other accusations, as well as being present at the scene of Galbardi's death.

On 18 May, Dominique Baudis stated that an ex-prostitute had accused him of being an accomplice of Alègre. He denied the claims and said that they were false accusations brought forward by "the pornography lobby", which had engaged in a smear campaign against him after he had recommended a ban on pornographic films on television.

André Mayrac, the owner of several libertine clubs, requested to be heard by the courts, saying that he possessed photos of the infamous "dungeon" where the alleged crimes took place. However, the photos were found not to have a link to the case.

Journalist Karl Zéro interviewed Khelifi in June 2003, where Khelifi claimed to have witnessed children hanging from hooks inside of a torture chamber. Though Zéro claimed that Khelifi hadn't been paid for the interview, it turned out later that she received a car valued at roughly 10,000 Euros and that Zéro was working on a book written with Khelifi. Zéro had also received a letter from Alègre, which he read on live on air, where Alègre confirmed to have killed prostitute Claude Martinez on the orders of Baudis.

=== Sentences and dismissal of charges ===
On 21 February 2002, the Assize Court of Haute-Garonne sentenced Alègre to life imprisonment for the five murders he committed between 1989 and 1997, with a probation period of twenty-two-years.

On 27 May 2003, Puis was indicted for making false accusations and sentenced to prison. While incarcerated, he retracted the statements he had made and attempted suicide. However, he later insisted that everything he initially told investigators was true. On 20 September 2003, Puis was found dead in a psychiatric clinic in Toulouse. His death was ruled a suicide by drug overdose.

Bourre was arrested on 20 June 2003 for "complicity in false testimonies" after the court found that she had manipulated Puis into making false statements. After Bourre's arrest, Alègre seemingly retracted his confession to the murders of Galbardi and Martinez. Khelifi went on to change her testimony in September 2003; she said that Messaoudène was not present during Galbardi's murder. Messaoudène himself claimed to have been in Algeria at the time of Galbardi's murder, presenting stamps of entry and exit from Algeria as an alibi. Khelifi also retracted her previous statement of having been sexually assaulted by the police. She did, however, maintain that Baudis was a perpetrator in the crimes. Khelifi was examined by psychiatrist Daniel Ajzenberg, who stated that her statements were "credible on a psychiatric level".

In 2004, Perriquet ordered an investigation into the handling of the case by Homicide 31. Gendarme Michel Roussel and two justice officials were suspected of having conspired against Bourragué. Roussel interrogated Khelifi and Bourre alone even though procedure dictated that at least two officers had to be present. In 2003, a new investigative team was put together to look into the claims made by the former prostitutes. Roussel was subsequently sidelined from the investigation, after which he retired. Roussel later published a book in which he claimed that his investigations were hindered by people within the police force and that the force had been "infiltrated".

In 2005, Judge Thierry Perriquet stated that all charges against former Toulouse mayor Dominique Baudis and former deputy prosecutor of Toulouse Marc Bourragué were dismissed. Khelifi and Bourre were sentenced, respectively, to 18 months and three years in prison for perjury, reporting a false crime, and witness bribery in the Puis case. In addition to incarceration, both were deprived of their civil rights for 5 years. On 26 February 2006, the Toulouse Criminal Court found both Khelifi and Bourre guilty of defamation and sentenced them to two and three years' of suspended prison sentences, respectively.

== Later developments ==
=== Accusations of cover-up ===
The Alègre affair is considered to have been politically butchered. Some murders were initially declared suicides before Alègre's arrest. Several witnesses claimed that the killer was protected for a long time by police officers and members of the judicial system. Former gendarme, Michel Roussel, noted that there were 191 unsolved murders in the region. The organization Stop to Forget brought together the victims' families, who continue to demand the truth from the case, referring to these disappearances as "camouflaged as suicides and covered by truncated, distorted and sloppy investigations".

=== Roche children claims ===
The Alègre affair resurfaced in 2005 when Charles Louis-Roche and Diane Roche, children of Pierre Roche, who had been the president of the justice chamber at Nîmes Court of Appeal during the Alègre affair, claimed that their father had been murdered by a sex trafficking network in which he had implicated himself. Both of them were charged with "aggravated defamation and invasion of privacy". They then went on to create a website to denounce Pierre Roche, as a "corrupt man, unworthy, violent and perverse husband and father", "sickening orgy participant, consumer to the chain of prostitutes of all kinds, who had made their lives a daily hell." Charles and Diane claimed that their father confided to them that he had taken part in the evenings at which ritual sacrifices and tortures took place. They claimed that he had gathered incriminating evidence on people within the network. Charles and Diane claim that later he completely lost his mind and burned tons of documents that were in his possession.

== Chronology of the case ==
- 5 September 1997: Arrest of Patrice Alègre, suspected of murder between February 1989 and September 1997. He admitted to five murders, one attempted murder, and six rapes, but was also indicted for four other murders.
- 21 February 2002: Alègre is sentenced to life imprisonment with a twenty-year lock-in period. Psychiatrists, Michel Dubec and Daniel Zagury, evoked the hypothesis of "displaced matricide" to explain Alègre's murders, whom they described as "an organized serial killer", "a psychopath", "a malignant narcissist" having undergone disorganization traumas related to "maternal sexual abuse".
- June 2002, gendarme unit Homicide 31 is established on prosecutor's request to carry out an investigation into other possible victims of Alègre. One such case, concerning the 1992 Toulouse murder of the prostitute Line Galbardi, led them to two former Toulouse prostitutes who were familiar with Galbardi: Christèle 'Patricia' Bourre and Florence 'Fanny' Khelifi.
- 1 April 2003, the newspaper La Dépêche du Midi launched a press campaign, released statements from the two women, and put pressure on the justice department to disclose more information. Paris newspapers followed suit and the rumour swelled, fed mainly by two local journalists.
- 15 April 2003, the Toulouse prosecutor opened a judicial investigation against Alègre and others accused of committing gang rapes and aggravated rapes. The investigation looked into acts of torture and barbarism, committed by people abusing the authority that conferred their function, following the statements of former prostitutes Khelifi and Bourre.
- 12 May 2003, the weekly Marianne presented the result of their investigations, in particular recent "revelations" made by one of the prostitutes. It involved police officers and a gendarme from Toulouse who "were aware of their actions and the corruption but also organized parties in the presence of at least two Toulouse lawyers and other notables..", with the name of the Toulouse mayor even being quoted.
- 18 May 2003, the former mayor of Toulouse, Dominique Baudis denounced the TF1 TV channel for quoting his name in the investigation and claimed it was a "frightening machination" related to the "pornographic industry".
- 19 May 2003, Baudis charged his lawyer with defamation.
- 22 May 2003, two prostitutes confirmed their remarks before the judges and Pierre-Olivier Puis, under the pseudonym "Djamel", said that there have been "dead".
- 27 May 2003, Jean Volff, Attorney General of Toulouse, announced that his name was also cited in the case. He was replaced the following day. A new judicial investigation was opened against Puis, Khelifi, and Bourre for alleged crimes and imaginary misdemeanours, false testimonies, and complicity. Puis was placed in custody, with Baudis, Volff and Marc Bourragué becoming civil parties in the case.
- 13 June 2003, Baudis accused the head of La Dépêche du Midi, Jean-Michel Baylet, of plotting against him.
- 30 June 2003, on the day of his installation in the highest court of appeal, Volff protested in Le Figaro against the way he was treated by Dominique Perben, Minister of Justice and media.
- 17 September 2003, Khelifi retracted her rape charges against Baudis.
- 20 September 2003, Puis was found dead at a Toulouse psychiatric clinic.
- 11 July 2005, the investigating chamber of the Court of Appeals of Toulouse discussed the component of "rapes and organized pimping gangs" in which Baudis and others were implicated in.
- December 2005, 32-year-old Khelifi was indicted for slanderous denunciation against Baudis and Bourragué.
- September 2006, Bourre was indicted for slanderous denunciation against Baudis.
- 2006, Emilia Espès, the only survivor of Alègre's attacks, committed suicide.
- 28 March 2008, the prosecution announced that the ex-prostitutes would be tried in correctional for "slanderous denunciation" towards Baudis and Volff. After returning to their initial statements they were found guilty and respectively sentenced to two and three years in prison, which were suspended by the Toulouse Criminal Court on 26 March 2009.
- 3 July 2008, the investigating judges of Toulouse district, Serge Lemoine and Fabrice Rives made an order of dismissal concerning three homicides and rape with a weapon connected with Alègre.
- September 2019, after having served his minimum 22-year term in prison, Alègre applied for parole.

=== Deaths related to the case ===
| Name of the witness | Connection to the case | Time of death | Cause of death |
|---|---|---|---|
| Pierre Roche | President of the chamber at the Nîmes Court of Appeal | 22 February 2003 | Died under unclear circumstances, body was cremated |
| Pierre-Olivier Puis | A transvestite who, alongside former prostitutes Khelifi and Bourre, described S&M evenings organized by a pimping network in Toulouse, which was attended by prominent members of society | 20 September 2003, found dead at a psychiatric clinic in Toulouse | Suicide by drug overdose |
| Emillia Espès | Only known survivor of Alègres' crime spree, fled after being raped by him on 22 February 1997 | 2006 | Suicide |

== Alègre's confirmed victims ==
- 1985, raped a 17-year-old, attempted to strangle her afterwards
- 21 February 1989 Valérie Tariote, 21, waitress, found dead with her hands tied, gagged, naked, panties torn, a scarf at the back of her throat and a pan of blood under her head, initially declared a suicide.
- 25 January 1990 Laure Martinet, raped and killed.
- 11 February 1997, Martine Matias, 29, was beaten, rendered unconscious with chloroform and her house was set on fire. Initially declared a suicide.
- 3/1997, Emilie Espes was raped by Alègre and was almost strangled. Espes reported to police afterwards that she was raped by a stranger and described Alègre.
- 19 June 1997, Mireille Normand, 35, was raped and killed.
- 4 September 1997, Isabelle Chicherie, 31, strangled.

=== Suspected victims ===
- 23 September 1990, 23-year-old Edith Schleichardt, was found dead with a jacket pulled up to her chest. Underwear and tights were found removed, and a tear gas canister trapped between the thighs. Ruled a suicide by drug overdose.

== See also ==
=== Bibliography ===
- Books about the case (in chronological order)
  - Michel Roussel, Homicide 31 – Au cœur de l'affaire Alègre, Éditions Denoël, 24 January 2004, 240 pages, ISBN 2207255646
  - Ugo Rankl, Patrice Alègre, l'homme qui tuait les femmes, Éditions Nicolas Philippe, 21 October 2004, 388 pages, ISBN 2748800680
  - Christian English and Frédéric Thibaud, Affaires non-classées, tome II (Chapter: L'affaire Patrice Alègre), First edition, 15 June 2004, 294 pages, ISBN 2876919095
  - Dominique Baudis, Face à la calomnie, XO Éditions, 20 January 2005, 318 pages, ISBN 9782845631892
  - Pierre Alfort and Stéphane Durand-Souffland, J'ai défendu Patrice Alègre, Éditions du Seuil, 28 January 2005, 188 pages, ISBN 2020635135
  - Marie-France Etchegoin and Mathieu Aron, Le bûcher de Toulouse, D'Alègre à Baudis : histoire d'une mystification, Éditions Grasset et Fasquelle, 18 May 2005, 425 pages, ISBN 2246677610
  - Gilbert Collard and Édouard Martial, L'étrange Affaire Alègre, Éditions du Rocher, 9 June 2005, 186 pages, ISBN 978-2268054919
  - Jean Volff, Un procureur général dans la tourmente. Les dérives de l'affaire Alègre, L'Harmattan, Paris, 2006, 192 pages, ISBN 2-296-01067-9
  - Antoine Perraud, La barbarie journalistique, Flammarion, 30 January 2007, 193 pages, ISBN 978-2082105866
  - Georges Fenech, Presse-Justice: liaisons dangereuses, L'Archipel, 7 March 2007, 190 pages, ISBN 978-2841879304
  - Gilles Souillés, L'Affaire Alègre, la vérité assassinée, Hugo et compagnie, 22 May 2007, 276 pages, ISBN 978-2755601206
  - Agnès Grossmann, L'enfance des criminels, éd. Hors Collection, 20 September 2012, 298 pages, ISBN 2258098424
  - Jean Volff, Servir, éd. Jerôme Do-Bentzinger, 12 April 2013, 496 pages, ISBN 978-2849603635
- Novel inspired by the case
  - G.M. Bon, Contes cruels, Toulouse, Éditions l'Écailler du Sud, 1 September 2004 (Roman noir), 248 pages, ISBN 978-2914264570

=== Press articles ===
- Press articles on the Alègre Affair in La Dépêche du Midi.
- "Patrice Alègre is getting married in prison" Article by Marie Desnos published on 14 July 2009 in Paris Match.

=== TV documentaries ===
- Affaires criminelles, presented by Yves Rénier on 7 February 10 July 16 and 21 August 21 and 29 October 2 and 12 November 2010, "The Patrice Alègre Case" on NT1.
- Get the Accused, "Patrice Alègre, the blood and the rumor" presented by Frédérique Lantieri, broadcast on 18 January 2015, on France 2, 115 minutes.
- "I defended Patrice Alègre" in Toute une histoire 17 March 2016, on France 2.
- "Alègre: the cold-blooded killer" (first report) in "Special: they made Toulouse tremble" on 26 September 2016, in Crimes on NRJ 12.

=== Related articles ===
- List of French serial killers
- List of serial killers by country

=== External links ===
- Association Stop à l'Oubli
- Biography of Patrice Alègre on a site devoted to criminal cases.
- Biography of Patrice Alègre on a site devoted to criminal cases.
