= Being Jacques Chirac =

- Poster
- French: Dans la peau de Jacques Chirac
- Directed by: Michel Royer; Karl Zero
- Written by: Ahmed Hamidi; Michel Royer; Éric Zemmour; Karl Zero
- Produced by: Yves Darondeau; Christophe Lioud; Emmanuel Priou; Karl Zero
- Starring: Jacques Chirac (archive footage); Didier Gustin
- Edited by: Pascal Ryon
- Music by: Loïc Dury; Laurent Levesque
- Distributed by: Rézo Films
- Release date: May 31, 2006
- Running time: 90 minutes
- Country: France
- Language: French

Being Jacques Chirac (French: Dans la peau de Jacques Chirac, meaning "In Jacques Chirac's skin") is a 2006 film by Karl Zero and Michel Royer.

It is a mockumentary about Jacques Chirac based on archival footage, narrated in the first person by an actor imitating the voice of Chirac.

== Award ==
- César Award, Best Documentary
