= Kaliroots =

Canadian reggae band

- Origin: Mont-Saint-Hilaire, Quebec, Canada
- Genres: Roots reggae
- Years active: 1996–present
- Label: Subsonik
- Awards: ADISQ Felix Award – World Music; 2006
- Members: Philippe Dalpé; Carole Facal; Doriane Fabreg; Dominic Girard; Jean-Sébastien Girard; Sébastien Jean; Alexis Messier; Alain Peddie; Martin Renaud; David Robidoux; Jean-François Thibault
- Past members: Karim Amal; Daniel Deslauriers; Yanik Garon; Georges Parent; Simon Lavoie; Jean Bolduc; Sean Hill

Kaliroots is a Canadian roots reggae band from Mont-Saint-Hilaire, Quebec. It is the first French-speaking reggae band to establish itself in Quebec, and the first French-speaking group to do reggae in French and English on the same album. The band's leader is keyboardist Jean-Sebastien Girard.

== History ==
In 1995, guitarist Allan Peddie and a friend, Vancouver bassist Sean Hill, founded a reggae duo called Rootsy Kali. They played a few parties, then Hill returned to British Columbia, but others had become interested and, in 1996, Kaliroots formed as a nine-member band, with musicians from the classical, jazz, and rock worlds. They began performing in bars in Montreal, created the Reggae Night Fever concept at Club Soda, and spent the summer of 1997 playing The Jailhouse Rock Cafe every Friday night, as well as gigs at clubs such as Le Medley Showbar (The Medley). They also participated in the music competition Empire of the Future Stars (which took place at Club Soda), making it to the quarter-finals. And they performed at ROSEQ, the annual meeting of the Network of Eastern Quebec Show Organizers.

In 1998, the band self-released an album, Roots Rock Kébec, which was sold online. On February 14, 1998, they opened for The Wailers Band (the band of the late Bob Marley) at The Medley, where they had become the Friday night band–they'd brought the Reggae Night Fever concept with them. In 1999, they played the Quebec music festival Coup de Coeur Francophone, which led to an offer by Leila Records to record an album at the Washington DC studio of sound engineer Jim Fox, who has been called "the king of reggae".

The result was their second album Rien a perdre (Nothing to Lose), which was released in May 2000. That summer, they appeared at the Lévis World Music Festival, Les Francofolies de Montreal, and Woodstock en Beauce. At the 2001 ADISQ awards, Kaliroots won the Felix award for Quebec Artist - World Music.

Kali released an album, Mission Internationale, in 2004.

They continued to play music festivals, including Les Francofolies de Montreal in 2005, 2010, and 2011. According to its Facebook page, the band last performed in February 2018.

== Members ==
- Philippe Dalpé: tenor sax
- Carole Facal: chorist (since September 2000)
- Doriane Fabreg: chorist (since September 2000)
- Dominic Girard: bass guitar (since June 2005)
- Jean-Sébastien Girard: organ, keyboards, clavinet
- Sébastien Jean: trumpet (since September 2000)
- Alexis Messier: guitar
- Alain Peddie: vocals, guitar
- Martin Renaud: drums
- David Robidoux: percussions (since September 2000)
- Jean-François Thibault: trombone

== Past members ==
- Karim Amal: percussions (1996–2000)
- Daniel Deslauriers: bass guitar (1996–2005)
- Yanik Garon: guitar (1996–2000)
- Georges Parent: trumpet (1996–2000)
- Simon Lavoie: trombone (1996–2000)
- Jean Bolduc: Guitar (From Jailhouse Rock Cafe Period)
- Sean Hill: Bass (1995)

== Discography ==
- Roots Rock Kebec, 1998, Independent
- Rien a perdre, 2000, Les Promotions Jamil
- Mission Internationale, 2004, Subsonik Records
