= The Original Wailers =

Jamaican reggae group

- Origin: Kingston, Jamaica
- Genres: Reggae
- Years active: 2008 – present
- Label: MRG Recordings
- Spinoff of: Bob Marley & the Wailers; The Wailers Band
- Members: Al Anderson, Chet Samuel, Rohan Reid, Howard Smith, Noel Aiken
- Past members: Junior Marvin, Desmond Hyson, Steve Samuels, Christian Cowlin, Erica Newell, Paapa Nyarkoh
- Website: www.theoriginalwailers.com

The Original Wailers are a reggae group formed by Al Anderson and Junior Marvin in 2008. Both are best known as guitarists for Bob Marley and the Wailers as well as former members of The Wailers Band. In April 2011, Marvin departed the band.

== Discography ==
=== Miracle EP (2012) ===
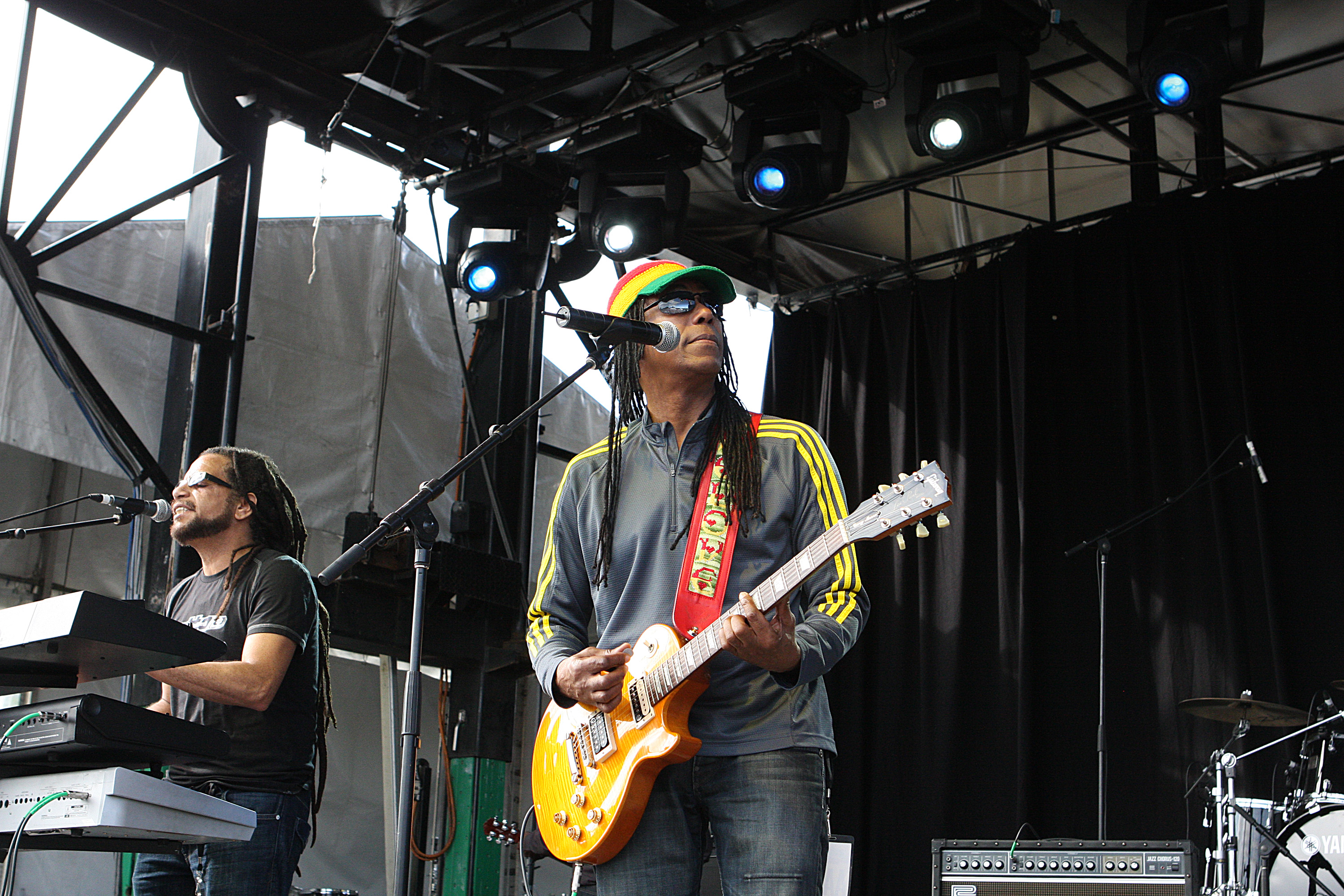
Desi Hyson and Junior Marvin performing at Raggamuffin Music Festival#2011

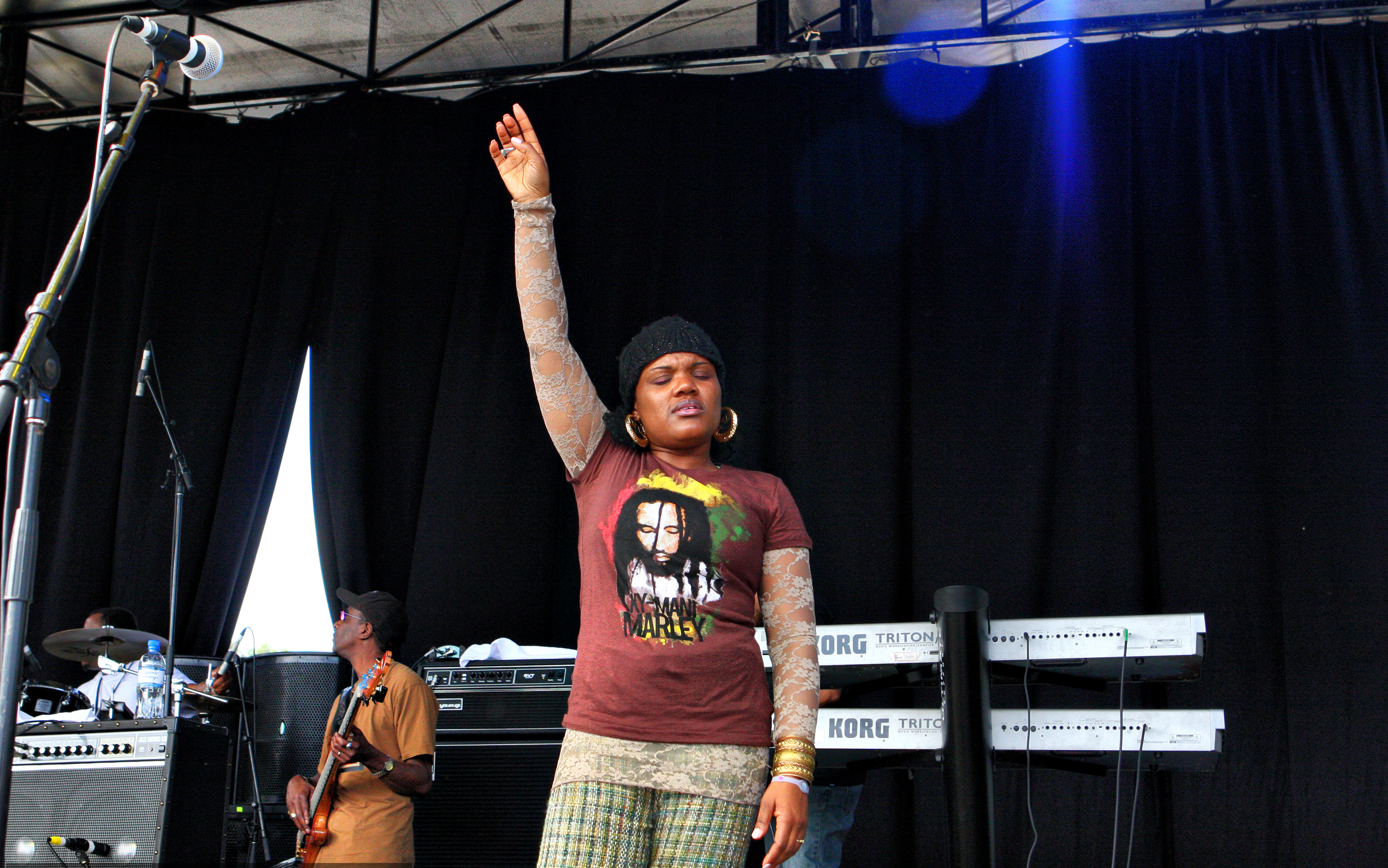
Erica Newell performing at Raggamuffin Music Festival#2011

Cover of the EP The Original Wailers: Miracle

Four songs from the album are penned by singer & keyboardist, Desi Hyson. Backing singer Erica Newell, formerly of the Melody Makers sings on the cover of "Our Day Will Come".

MRG Recordings released The Original Wailers debut EP Miracle on 10 April 2012. Miracle was nominated for Best Reggae Album at the 55th Annual Grammy Awards on 5 December 2012.

No.	Title	Composer	Length
1.	"Blackbird"	Desmond Hyson	3:32
2.	"Justice"	Desmond Hyson	3:43
3.	"Love Supposed To Do"	Desmond Hyson	4:18
4.	"Dangerous"	Desmond Hyson	4:04
5.	"Our Day Will Come"	Mort Garson, Bob Hilliard	2:54

==== Personnel ====
- Produced by Al Anderson and Karl Pitterson
- Recorded and Engineered by Karl Pitterson at Clubhouse Studio in Rhinebeck, NY
- Mixed by Karl Pitterson, Jason Corsaro and Al Anderson.
- Mastered by Tom Ryan at Gateway Mastering, Portland, ME
