= Junior Marvin =

British musician (born 1949)

Donald Hanson Marvin Kerr Richards Jr.
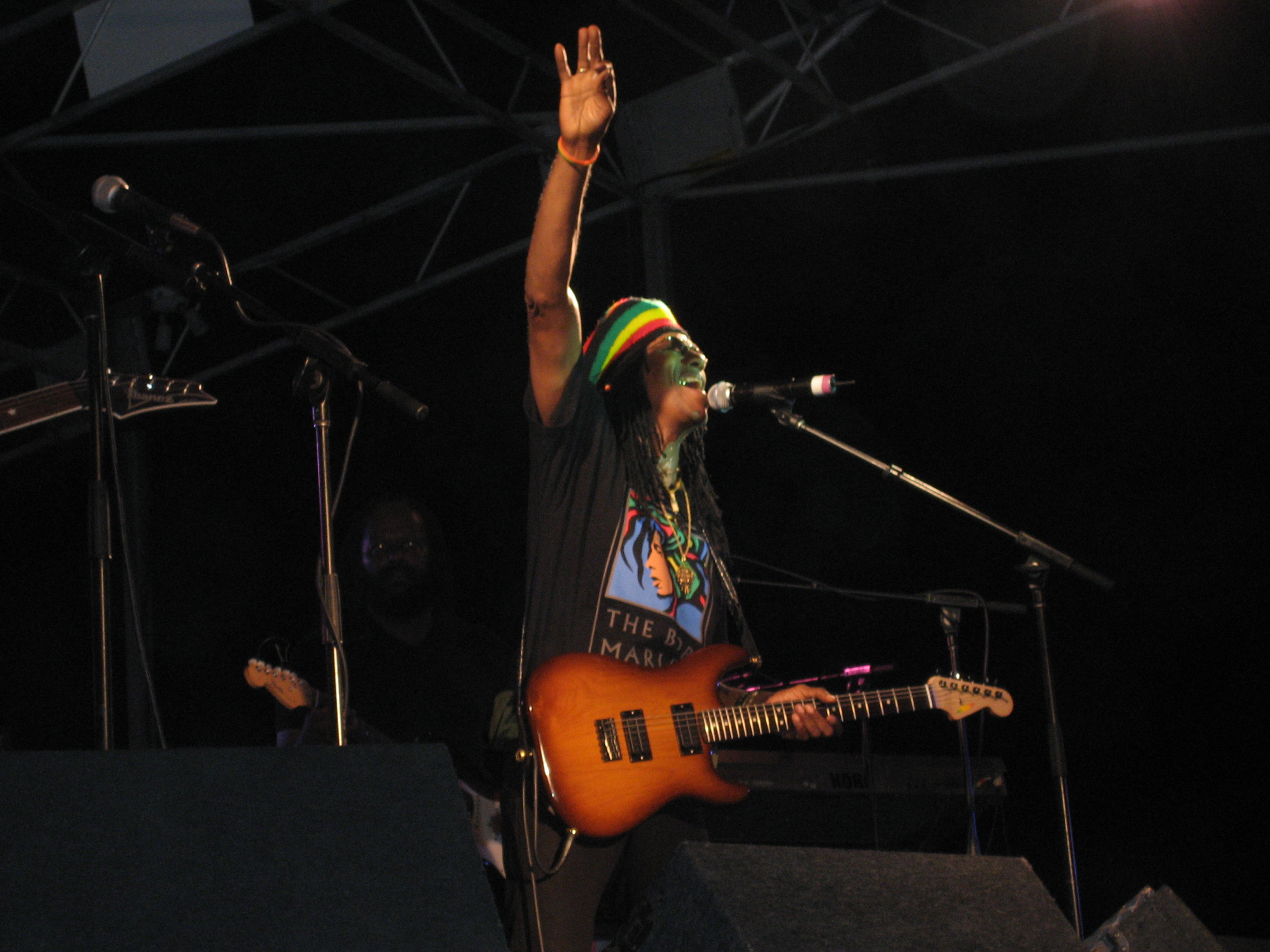
- Junior Marvin in Santa Monica (2007)

Background information
- Also known as: Junior Hanson, Junior Kerr, Julian Junior Marvin
- Born: June 22, 1949 (age 77); Kingston, Surrey County, Jamaica
- Genres: Reggae; Rock; R&B
- Occupation: Musician
- Instruments: Guitar; vocals
- Years active: 1969–present
- Labels: Manticore; Island; Universal; Ork
- Member of: The Legendary Wailers
- Formerly of: Hanson; Bob Marley and the Wailers; The Wailers band; The Original Wailers
- Website: Official website

Junior Marvin also known as Junior Marvin-Hanson, Junior Hanson, Junior Kerr, and Julian Junior Marvin, is a Jamaican-born guitarist and singer best known for his association with Bob Marley and The Wailers. He started his career working with artists such as T-Bone Walker and as Junior Hanson when he formed the band Hanson in 1973. Marvin has also been associated with Gass and others such as Steve Winwood.

== Early life ==
Born in Kingston, Surrey County, Jamaica, Marvin moved to London as a child where his love of both acting and music was nurtured.

== Career ==
=== Early years ===
Marvin appeared in the Beatles' film Help! as a child actor. He served his musical apprenticeship in USA by playing with artists including Toots and the Maytals, T-Bone Walker and Ike & Tina Turner. He later moved to England and played with the Keef Hartley band and the White Rabbit band.

=== Hanson and Bob Marley ===
In 1973, he formed the band Hanson and recorded two albums. after the second album Magic Dragon (1974) they disbanded. Marvin used a fuzzbox guitar effect when recording with the band and in session work. This sound and his prowess as a guitarist was noticed by The Wailers. He met Bob Marley on 14 February 1977. His use of this effect became an integral part of the Bob Marley and the Wailers’ sound on songs from their album Exodus and later songs, after he joined them. Hanson played as a member of Bob Marley and the Wailers until Marley's death in 1981.

=== Stevie Wonder, Wailer bands and other associations ===
Marvin turned down a ten year deal to work with Stevie Wonder at the same time he joined Bob Marley and the Wailers. After Marley’a death and along with the remaining Wailers members he formed The Wailers Band and they released the albums ID, Majestic Warriors, JAH Message and Live 95–97 My Friends. In 1997, Marvin left The Wailers Band and relocated to Brazil where he formed the short lived group Batuka. Following his return from Brazil, Marvin worked as a session musician for Kaliroots and The Wailers Band.

In 2007, Marvin recorded a solo album titled Wailin' For Love. During 2008, Marvin and guitarist Al Anderson formed The Original Wailers and toured with them until 2011. After leaving the Original Wailers Marvin returned to solo work and in 2019 he formed The Legendary Wailers.

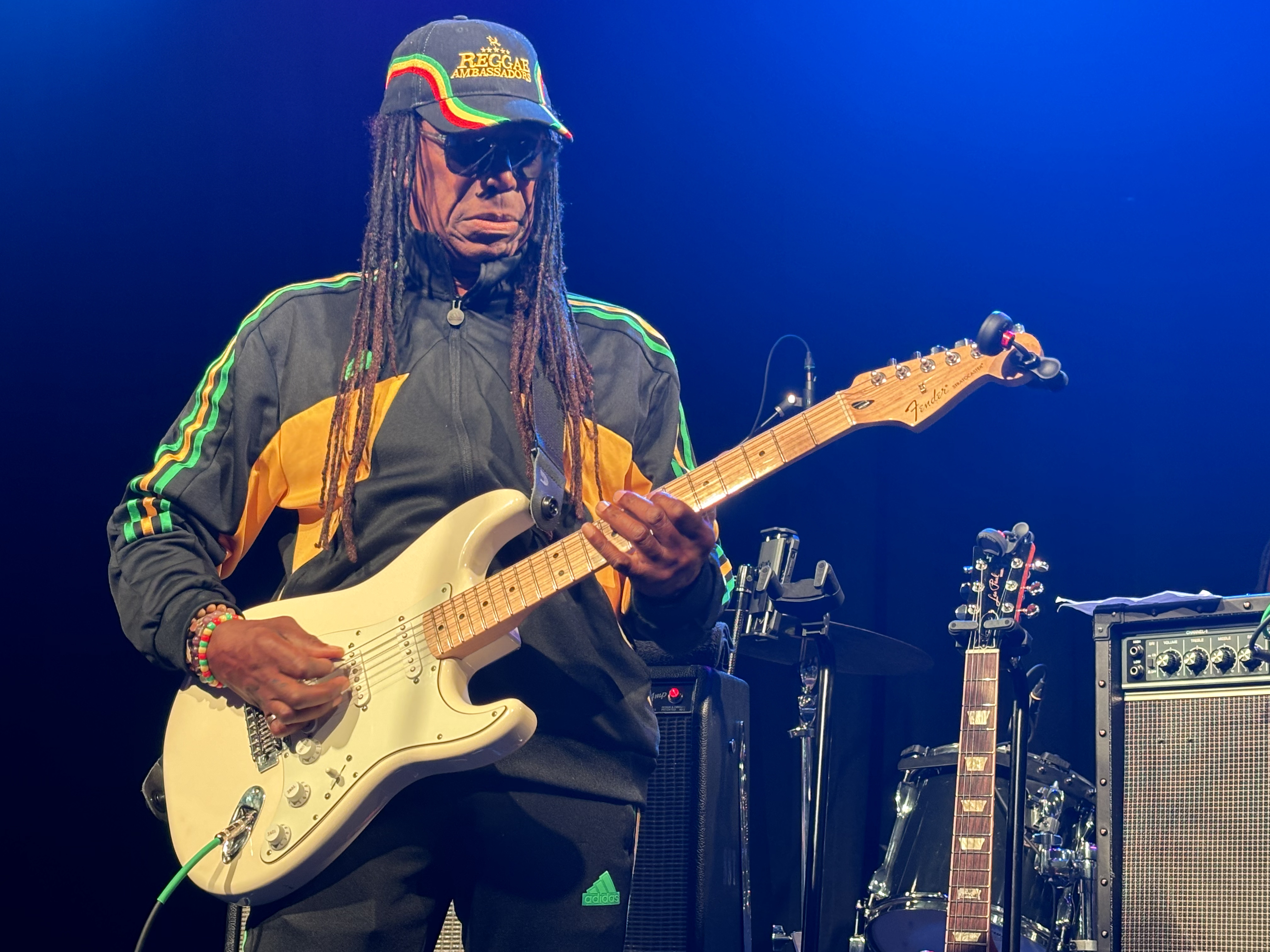
Junior Marvin in 2024

== Band membership ==
- 1965 – Blue-Ace-Unit with Calvin "Fuzzy" Samuel.
- 1969 – White Rabbit with Linda Lewis.
- 1970 – Keef Hartley Band as Junior Kerr.
- 1973 – Hanson as Junior Hanson.
- 1977 – Bob Marley & The Wailers as Junior Marvin
- 1981 – The Wailers Band
- 1997 – Batuka
- 2005 – The Wailers Band
- 2008 – The Original Wailers
- 2011 – Junior Marvin
- 2013 – Junior Marvin & One Love
- 2014 – Junior Marvin's Force One
- 2015 – Junior Marvin's Wailers
- 2018 – The Wailers
- 2019 – Julian Junior Marvin´s Wailers
- 2020 - The Legendary Wailers

== Discography ==
=== As a session musician ===
- Gass Juju Polydor (1970) credited as Junior Kerr
- Toots & the Maytals Reggae Got Soul (1976)
- Delroy Washington I Sus (1976)
- Stomu Yamashta, Steve Winwood, Michael Shrieve Go (1976) credited as Julian Marvin
- Steve Winwood Steve Winwood (1977) credited as Junior Hanson or Julian [Jr] Marvin
- Burning Spear Hail H.I.M. (1980) and The Fittest of the Fittest (1983)
- Joe Higgs Blackman Know Yourself (1990)
- Bunny Wailer Hall of Fame: A Tribute to Bob Marley (1995)
- Don Carlos Prophecy (1995)
- Culture Payday (1999)
- Israel Vibration Jericho (2000)
- Lenny Kravitz on Saturday Night Live, 20 January 2001
- OAR "Any Time Now" and "Night Shift/Stir It Up," (2002)
- Alpha Blondy Jah Victory (2007)
- Quique Neira (Chile), Jah Rock (2007)
- Jah Roots Joy Ganjah Records (2008)
- Los Pericos "Pericos & Friends" (2010)
- Regan Perry "Flow", Mash It Up Records (2013)

=== Bob Marley ===
- Exodus (1977)
- Kaya(1978)
- Survival (1979)
- Uprising (1980)
- Confrontation (1983)
- Legend:The best of Bob Marley and the Wailers (1984)

=== Wailers Band ===
- ID (1989)
- Majestic Warriors (1991)
- JAH Message (1995)
- My Friends (1997)

=== Solo albums ===
- Wailin' For Love (2007)
- Smokin' to the Big M Music (2013)
- Lion to Zion-Dub Wise (2013)

== Videos ==
- Red Bull Music Academy Lecture with Junior Marvin (Montreal 2016)
