= Carole Facal =

Canadian singer-songwriter from Quebec

Caracol
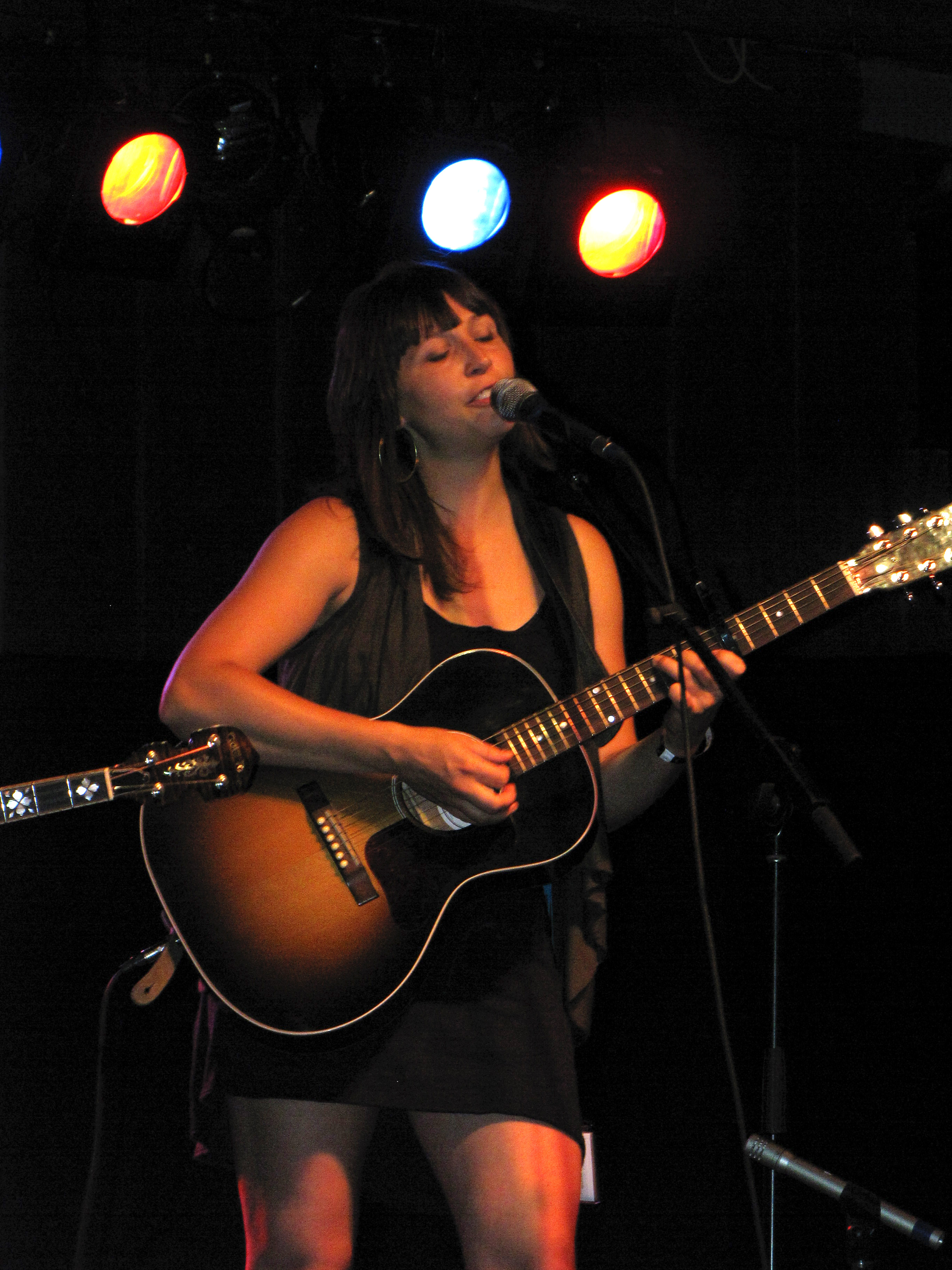
- Caracol at the 2010 Summerfolk Music and Crafts Festival

Background information
- Also known as: Caracol
- Born: Carole Facal
- Genres: Indie-pop
- Occupation: Singer-songwriter
- Instrument: Guitar
- Years active: 1998–present
- Labels: Indica Records, L'autre Distribution, Wagram Records
- Website: www.caracolmusic.com

Carole Facal is a Canadian singer-songwriter from Quebec who writes and performs in both English and French under the stage name Caracol.

== Early life ==
Born to an Uruguayan father and a Swiss mother and raised in Sherbrooke, Quebec, Facal was trained in classical violin. Always athletic, she left home at 17 to pursue a career as a snowboarder in British Columbia. There, she purchased a guitar and began to write her own music.

== Career ==
Facal ultimately returned to Quebec and joined the reggae group Kaliroots, also forming (in 1998) a dreadlocked duet act called DobaCaracol with Dorianne Fabreg (Doba). DobaCaracol (the name is a fusion of the two singers' stage names) had a percussive world music sound and toured internationally. The group released two albums, Le Calme Son (2001) and SOLEY (2004). SOLEY sold more than 100,000 copies worldwide, was certified Gold in Canada, and won a Félix Award. Their profile was raised in English Canada with their performance at the 2005 Live 8 Toronto concert.

DobaCaracol broke up in 2007, after which Facal began work on her first solo album, L'arbre aux parfums, released in September 2008. The album, which is an eclectic mix of reggae, rocksteady and numerous other musical influences, was released to acclaim and led to two cash awards and a Juno nomination for Francophone Album of the Year.

In December 2009, she was scheduled to play as the lead act for Serena Ryder on a brief tour of Atlantic Canada. A European tour (France, Belgium, and Switzerland) followed in March 2010.

Her 2011 release was entitled Blanc mercredi, followed by the album Shiver in 2012, which was the first one consequently in English language.

Caracol released an album in November 2018 named Symbolism. The album originated with an encounter with producer Joey Waronker (Beck, Atoms for Peace) during a creative trip to Los Angeles. After he fell in love with her demos, he decided to work with her. They went on to record 12 songs where Caracol reached a new height in authenticity and artistic expression. She then continued the exploration at her headquarters of Studio de l'Est, with her long-time allies Seb Ruban & Toast Dawg, producers from Montreal. Symbolism also involved a collaboration with multidisciplinary artists The Doodys and artistic director Fred Caron.

== Personal life ==
Carole Facal is a younger sister of the Quebec politician Joseph Facal, a former Parti Québécois cabinet minister.

She has a child with her boyfriend.
