= Karl Zéro =

French television journalist

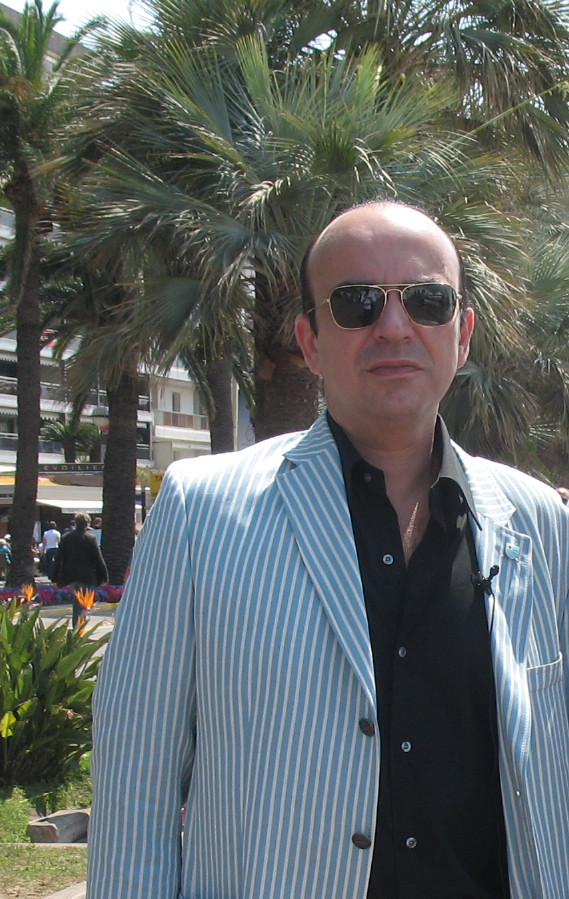
- Karl Zéro at the 2007 Cannes Film Festival
- Born: Marc Telenne; August 6, 1961 (age 64); Aix-les-Bains, France
- Occupation: Journalist

Karl Zéro is the stage name of Marc Tellenne (born August 6, 1961 in Aix-les-Bains, Savoie), is a French writer, actor and filmmaker. Zéro is also a political talk show host/personality (Le Vrai Journal) who has recorded albums of pop standards of the 1940s and 1950s.

== Biography ==
Karl Zéro is the youngest son of Gui Tellenne, a civil servant and poet, and Annick Tellenne, an author and talk-show host. He has three brothers: Éric, a writer under the name of Raoul Rabut, Bruno (aka Basile de Koch) and Olivier, a business executive. In the late 1970s Éric, Bruno and Marc founded the satirical comedy troupe Groupe d'Intervention culturelle Jalons. 1979 Zéro met his later wife and mother of their three children Anne-Laure Chaptel (today's stage name: Daisy d'Errata) in the lyceum both were attending. Anne-Laure as well as Bruno’s wife Virginie (Frigide Barjot) later on became members of the Jalons.

Zéro's first publication was a comic entitled The Adventures of Edmond in the magazine Jalons in the early 1980s. Subsequently, he started to work for the publications Métal Hurlant, Charlie Hebdo, Zoulou, and L'Écho des savanes, first as an artist and then as a story writer. At the same time, in 1981, he started working for the trendy magazine Actuel as a journalist specialising in interviewing stars. He also joined the just formed team of Radio Nova, working alongside his future wife, Daisy d’Errata. He then joined Globe and Lui, where his talents as an interviewer attracted notice. For a few months he hosted a comedy radio show on RFM with Antoine de Caunes and Albert Algoud called Babebibou.

In 1986, Karl Zéro was hired by Europe 1 to host their show Géant Gratuit (Free Giant) with Doug Headline (son of Jean-Patrick Manchette). They would be let go after four months. Zéro then returned to TF1 while Doug devoted himself to film. At TF1, Zéro's show Pirates with Jean-Yves Lafesse lasted for only one episode in September 1987. Again, his sense of humour was considered 'inappropriate' and he was let go.

Alain de Greef of Canal+ (a French pay for view TV channel) then offered him the direction of Nulle part ailleurs (Nowhere else) with his old collaborator Antoine de Caunes. He made use of video gags to bring political personalities into his sketches, which often focussed on current events. In 1993 he successfully proposed adding a television news report parody called "Zerorama", "telling events of moral rearmament", in which he used a mode of presentation and tone inspired by newsreels of the Vichy regime under Philippe Pétain in order to satirise Édouard Balladur's government and the media supporting it. Also in 1993, he directed an offbeat film called Le Tronc, in which he appeared alongside Albert Algoud, José Garcia and Lova Moor.

From September 1996 to June 2006, he was the presenter of Le Vrai Journal on Canal +, a television news show with the intention of 'saying out loud' what other French news shows 'kept hidden'. Karl Zéro is not a journalist and does not have press credentials. In the show, he mixed classic news reports, usually filmed by the CAPA Agency, and sketches using video gags, in which his wife Daisy d'Errata frequently played a part. When talking with politicians, he attempted to make them accept the informal mode of address. Over 10 seasons, his audience remained steady at a 10% market share, i.e., 1.5 million viewers a week. He became the reference point for politicians who wanted to reach young people.

Between 2000 and 2002, he published a printed offshoot of the show, le Vrai Papier Journal. Also from September 2001 to June 2002, at the suggestion of Eric Guillaumond, he co-produced with Michel Malaussena Le journal des bonnes nouvelles, also on Canal +. In March 2003 this was renamed Le contre-journal. He also produced 60 jours 60 nuits, which told the story of the intersecting lives of Joeystarr and Francis Lalanne.

In 2004, Zéro also hosted C’est quoi ce jeu? on Canal +.

In 1996, when Le Vrai journal was beginning, Karl Zéro agreed to John Paul Lepers' request that he meet with Pierre Carles, who had been censured a year earlier by Canal + for his film criticising TV journalism, Pas vu à la télé. Carles proposed filming an exposé of Canal + censorship, which Zéro was naturally unable to do on that same network. Carles' second proposal, on Jacques Chirac's practice of choosing the journalists who would interview him, notably Michel Field, who at the time also worked for Canal +, was also rejected, this time by Alain de Greef, who was head of programming. In 1998 Carles produced a film titled Pas vu pas pris in which he juxtaposed statements by Karl Zéro on his desire to say and show anything on his show with telephone conversations between the two in which he alluded to oversight by his bosses. Zéro, for his part, deplored Carles' wasting his time "beating down open doors", saying that "When one works for a television network, they're the ones who have the final cut".

A Catholic, Karl Zéro nonetheless does not hide his sympathy for alter-mundialist positions. His shows are produced by his own production company, La Société du spectacle, which is currently 50% owned by Endemol, which specialises in reality television.

In June 2003, with network consent and without naming them, he read aloud on the air the accusations of the serial killer Patrice Alègre (in the form of a letter which he had received from him) and of two former prostitutes that certain prominent people in Toulouse were involved in a sado-masochistic group which had covered up sexual assault, torture and murder. One of the accused was later found innocent. It also appeared that Zéro had paid one of the ex-prostitutes €15,000 as an advance on a book. The possible violation of journalistic ethics, frequent mentions of Zéro and Canal + in publicity about the accusations, and resulting political pressure contributed to the termination of his contract for Le Vrai Journal in June 2006. After three years of investigation, in March 2007 Judge Nathalie Turquey excused Karl Zéro from the necessity of appearing in the case, subject to future appeals.

Karl Zéro's blog, video, and forum site Web 2 Zéro has hosted many videos by his fans, the 'zéronautes', and interviews especially with September 11 Truth advocates, a position in which he is interested. Also online, in 2006–07 he hosted on AOL Le Club du Net, a weekly round-up of interviews concerning the French presidential election campaign produced by Power Podcast, and in mid-March 2007 JT2Zero, a daily video on demand online newscast about the campaign produced by Havas Media. Zéro supported the candidacy of José Bové, and in his official campaign clips, Zéro was the interviewer.

Since September 2007, Karl Zéro has hosted a segment called "Les Faits Karl Zéro" on 13e Rue, a show on unsolved crimes produced by Troisième Œil, and beginning in spring 2010 was to host 90-minute spin-off shows in prime time.

In January 2008, he accepted a position as head of the media division of the Belgian holding group Rentabiliweb.

Since September 2008, Karl Zéro has had a daily prime-time show on BFM TV. Initially an interview show called Karl Zéro sur BFM TV and inspired by CNN's Larry King Live, following the 2008 release of his film Starko! la saison 1 on Nicolas Sarkozy's first year as President of France, on 7 September 2009 this became Sarko Info, a parody of television news shows in which he conducts an interview following a commentary on the news by Michel Guidoni playing the part of Sarkozy as he already did in the movie.

== Filmography ==
=== Films directed and produced ===
- Le Tronc, co-directed with Bernard Faroux (1992)
- Dans la peau de Jacques Chirac, co-directed with Michel Royer (2006), an 'unauthorised autobiography' which won the César Award for best documentary in 2007
- Ségo et Sarko sont dans un bateau, co-directed with Michel Royer (2007)
- Being W, co-directed with Michel Royer (2007) with Jim Meskimen as the voice of George W. Bush recounting 'his' version of his life and 'his' world vision
- Starko! la saison 1, co-directed with Daisy D'Errata (2008). Instead of Michel Guidoni, Lambert Wilson is Sarkozy’s voice in the English version of that film which has been distributed in the USA by Michael Moore.
- En la piel de Fidel (aka Dans la peau de Fidel Castro) (2010)
- Being Michael Jackson, co-produced with Tarak Ben Ammar (2010)
- Chirac rebat la campagne (2012)
- Dans la peau de Vladimir Poutine, co-directed with Daisy D'Errata (2012)
- Moi, Luka Magnotta, co-directed with Daisy D'Errata (2013)
- Dans la peau de Kim Jong-un, co-directed with Daisy D'Errata (2014)
- Dans la peau de Hillary Clinton, co-directed with Daisy D'Errata (2016)

=== Actor ===
- Day and Night (1997), as Filippi

== Discography ==
- Songs for Cabriolets and Otros Tipos de Vehiculos (Naïve Records, 2000)
  - Most of the songs were included in the X-Files episode "Improbable".
  - The single "Inouis", a duet with his wife Daisy d’Errata, was issued in Taiwan in a Mandarin Chinese version and rose to #1 in the charts there.
- HiFi Calypso with The Wailers (Naïve Records, 2004)
- Songs for Moonlight Swim and Otros Tipos de Ocupaciones with El Rafael y su Conjunto Atractivo (Frémeaux & Associés, 2017)

== See also ==
- Frédéric Taddeï
- Thierry Ardisson
