= Al Anderson (musician) =

American guitarist and songwriter (born 1952)

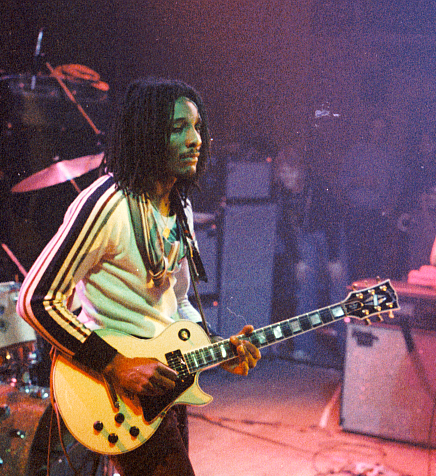
- Anderson performing with Peter Tosh in Cardiff, Wales in 1978

Background information
- Born: Albert Anderson; October 11, 1952 (age 74); New York City, U.S.
- Genres: Reggae, rock
- Occupations: Songwriter, guitarist
- Instruments: Guitar, percussion
- Years active: 1969–present
- Member of: The Original Wailers
- Formerly of: Bob Marley & The Wailers; The Wailers Band; The Centurions; Traffic

Albert Anderson (born October 11, 1952) is an American-born songwriter and guitarist.

Anderson grew up in Montclair, New Jersey and attended Montclair High School where he learned to play the trombone, eventually picking up guitar and bass guitar. He attended the Berklee College of Music contemporaneously with Pat Metheny and Al Di Meola after working with an early version of the band Aerosmith in the Boston music scene.

He joined The Centurions bringing him to the attention of Chris Wood of Traffic, who invited him to play on the band's next album. Being on the Traffic album never materialized but the interaction led to Anderson becoming employed by Traffic's record label Island Records, leading to him being asked to play lead guitar on Bob Marley & The Wailers' Natty Dread sessions. Anderson played lead guitar on "Crazy Baldhead" and on the Live! album, remaining with the band until 1976 when he joined Word, Sound and Power, backing Peter Tosh on the albums Legalize It and Equal Rights. He returned to Marley's band and played on the live album Babylon By Bus and the studio albums Survival and Uprising. After Marley's death, Anderson continued to tour with The Wailers Band.

He recorded with Ben Harper (Diamonds On the Inside (2003)) and Lauryn Hill on her multi-Grammy winning debut The Miseducation of Lauryn Hill (1998). He also produced and performed on an album for actor Steven Seagal (Songs from the Crystal Cave (2005)). In 2008, he formed the band The Original Wailers with Junior Marvin.

== Tours with Bob Marley & The Wailers ==
- Jun–Jul 1975: Natty Dread Tour (U.S., Canada, England)
- May–Aug 1978: Kaya Tour (U.S., Canada, England, France, Spain, Sweden, Denmark, Norway, Netherlands, Belgium)
- Apr–May 1979: Babylon by Bus Tour (Japan, New Zealand, Australia, Hawaii)
- Oct–Dec 1979: Survival Tour (U.S., Canada, Trinidad & Tobago, Bahamas)
- May–Sep 1980: Uprising Tour (Switzerland, Germany, France, Norway, Sweden, Denmark, Belgium, Netherlands, Italy, Spain, Ireland, England, Scotland, Wales, U.S.)
