= The Wailers Band =

Jamaican reggae band

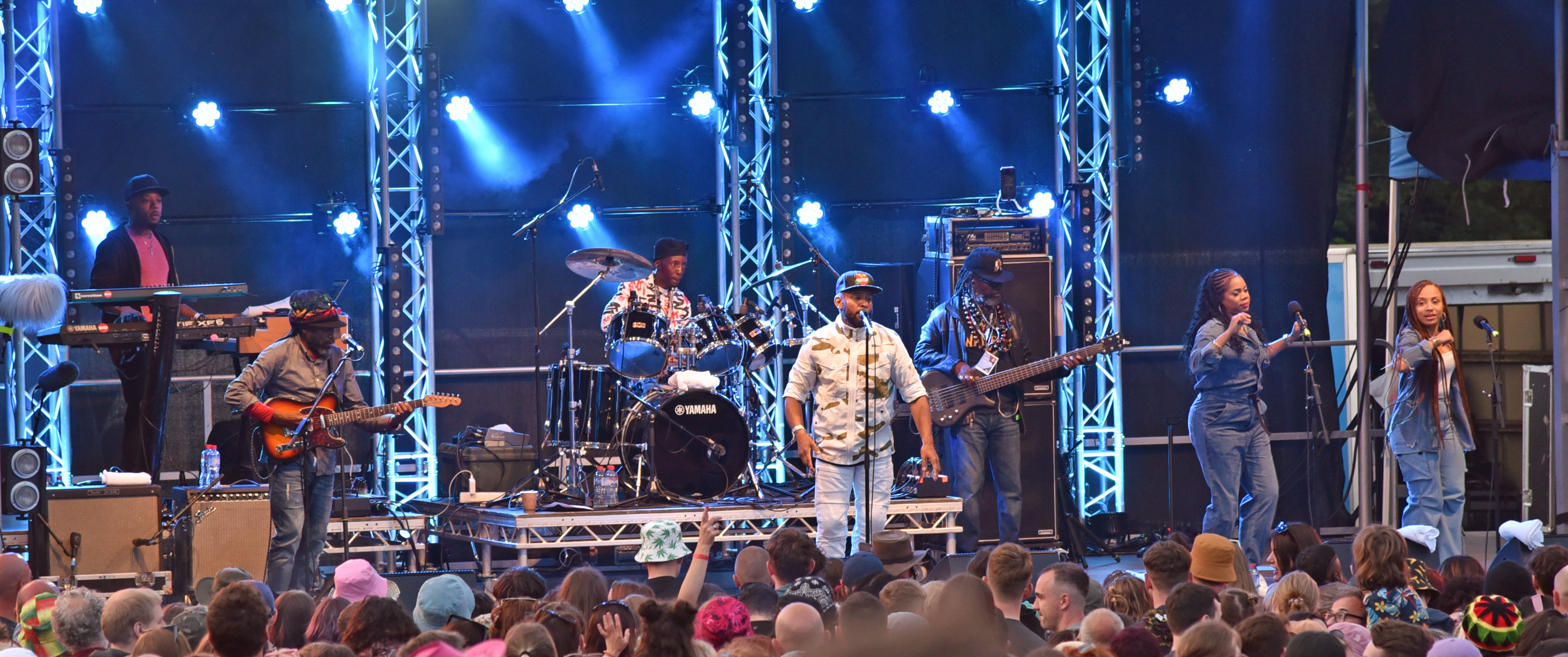
- The Wailers at the Stendhal Festival, 2023

Background information
- Origin: Kingston, Jamaica
- Genres: Reggae
- Years active: 1981–present
- Labels: Sony Latin, Island Records, Atlantic Records, Tabu Records, RAS Records
- Spinoffs: The Original Wailers
- Spinoff of: Bob Marley & the Wailers
- Members: Aston Barrett Jr. Owen "Dreadie" Reid; Josh David Barrett; Glen DaCosta; Andres Lopez; Junior Jazz; Mitchell Brunings
- Past members: Aston "Familyman" Barrett; Donald Kinsey; Junior Marvin; Carlton Barrett; Alvin "Seeco" Patterson; Tyrone Downie; Earl "Wire" Lindo; Al Anderson; Gary "Nesta" Pine; Joe Yamanaka; Elan Atias; Anthony Watson; Chico Chin; Everald Gayle; Irvin "Carrot" Jarrett; Brady Walters; Basil Creary; Keith Sterling; Kevin "Yvad" Davy; Ras Mel Glover "Drummie Zeb" Williams; Audley Chisholm; Koolant Brown; Dwayne Anglin; Ceegee Victory; Javaughn Bondd; Shema McGregor; Andres “Ipez” Lopez; Adrian Harvey
- Website: www.thewailers.com

The Wailers Band is a Jamaican reggae band formed by former members of Bob Marley and the Wailers after Marley's death in 1981. It was led by bassist Aston "Familyman" Barrett until 2016, when he passed the role onto his son, Aston Barrett Jr.

== History ==
=== After Marley, death of Carly Barrett, and Marvin's departure (1981–1997) ===
After the death of Bob Marley in 1981, the Wailers continued, led by bassist Aston "Familyman" Barrett and guitarist Junior Marvin. The band played a heavy worldwide touring schedule and recorded as backing band with several singers. Drummer Carlton "Carly" Barrett, 36, was murdered at his Jamaica home in 1987; despite this, and with a majority of the original musician lineup, they released their first album after Marley's death, I.D., in 1989. They followed up with an additional two studio albums, Majestic Warriors in 1991 and Jah Message in 1994. In addition to these three studio albums, a live album consisting of live performances of the band between the years of 1995 and 1997 was released as My Friends in 1997. Marvin departed the band to pursue solo work after this album and what was described as a disappointing 1997 tour.

=== Lineup changes, newfound competition, and success (1998–2008) ===
In 1998, Gary Pine joined the band's lineup as lead singer after Marvin's departure. In 2003 the band released a live DVD titled The Wailers - Live and followed it up in 2006 with the live album Legend - Live.

In 2008, Junior Marvin joined fellow former Wailer Al Anderson to form another spinoff known as The Original Wailers. That same year the Wailers Band were guests on the Kenny Chesney single "Everybody Wants to Go to Heaven"; the single proved successful, topping the US Country charts and peaking at #41 on the Billboard Hot 100. Barrett's son, Aston Barrett Jr., began performing with the group in 2009. In 2011, Marvin left The Original Wailers to form The Legendary Wailers.

=== Legend Tour and Wailers Reunited (2014–2016) ===
In 2014, The Wailers Band embarked on a worldwide tour marking the 30th anniversary of the release of the Legend compilation.

In 2015, Barrett began the process of reuniting past members of the Wailers, using the name the Wailers Reunited. Shows occurred in South America which included former members such as Marvin, Anderson, and Tyrone Downie. That year, the Wailers Band performed in India for the first time. A US and UK tour took place in 2016, after which Barrett retired from the group; despite this, he would be included as an official member well into 2020. His son and drummer, Aston Barrett Jr., took over as leader of the Wailers Band, while his student, Owen "Dreadie" Reid, took over on bass.

=== One World and death of Familyman (2020–present) ===
On August 21, 2020, the group released the album One World, their first studio album in twenty-six years. This was the first studio album released that contained a lineup without any of the original musicians in the band's lineup. It did, however, receive contributions from the trio the I Threes, Marley's backing vocalists.

Aston "Family Man" Barrett died on 3 February 2024.

The Wailers album *Evolution* received a 2025 Grammy Awards nomination for Best Reggae Album.

== Members ==
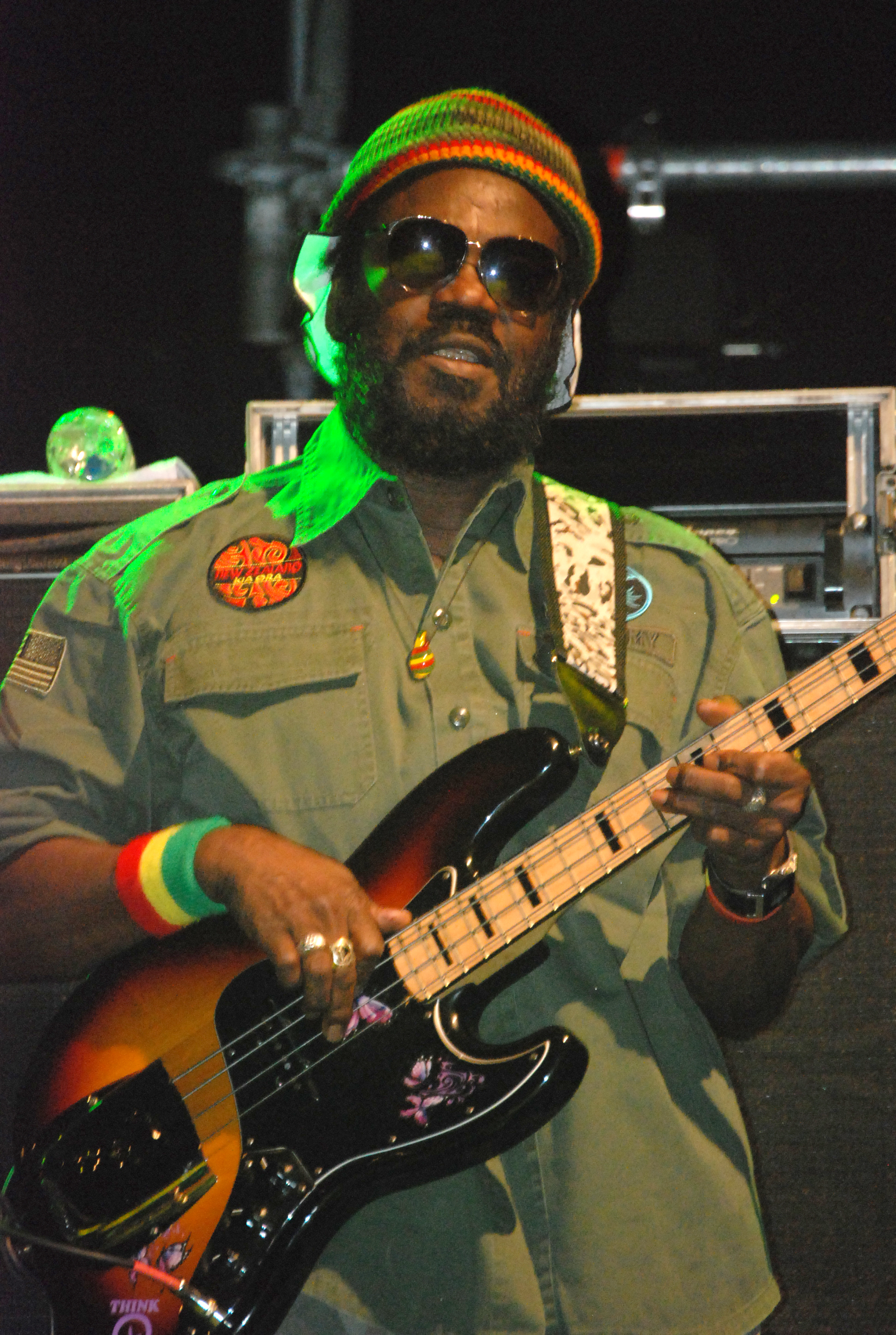
Aston "Familyman" Barrett in 2010

=== Current members ===
- Aston Barrett Jr. – drums, vocals
- Mitchell Brunings – lead vocals
- Wendell "Junior Jazz" Ferraro – guitar, vocals
- Owen "Dreadie" Reid – bass
- Andres "Ipez" Lopez – keys
- Teena "Tamara" Barnes – vocals
- Leonard "Lennie" Chen – "vibes man"

=== Former members ===
- Aston "Familyman" Barrett – bass (1972–2016; non-touring member 2016–2020; died 2024)
- Donald Kinsey – lead guitar (died 2024)
- Junior Marvin – guitar, vocals (1977–1997)
- Carlton Barrett – drums (1972–1987; died 1987)
- Seeco Patterson – percussion (died 2021)
- Tyrone Downie – keyboards (died 2021)
- Earl Lindo – keyboards, guitar (died 2017)
- Al Anderson – guitar
- Gary Pine – vocals (1998–2006)
- Mj Sands – drums(2008-2008)
- Joe Yamanaka – vocals (1981–1987?; died 2011)
- Elan Atias – vocals (1997–2010)
- Josh David Barrett – lead vocals (2014-2022)
- Glen Dacosta – saxophone

== Discography ==
=== Studio albums ===
- I.D. (1989)
- Majestic Warriors (1991)
- Jah Message (1994)
- One World (2020)
- Evolution (2024)

=== Live albums ===
- My Friends (Live '95-'97) (1997)
- Live at Maritime Hall (1999)
- Live In Jamaica (2001)
- The Wailers Live (2003) (DVD)
- Legend Live (2006)

=== With other artists ===
- Reggae Vibration with Joe Yamanaka (1982)
- It's About Time, with John Denver (1983)
- Watchful Eyes Acclaimed LP for Jah Mel (1983)
- International Farmer, Peter Broggs feat. the Wailers (1985)
- "Makisupa Policeman" for Sharin' in the Groove (2001)
- My Beautiful Garden, Donald & Lulu with The Wailers (1982)
- Jerusalem (Alpha Blondy album) (1986)
- Inkarnation, Iya Karna album with the Wailers (1986)
- Real Joy, Ludovic DeBarboza And The Wailers (1987)
- "A Step for Mankind" with Duane Stephenson & Bishop Lamont, Solutions for Dreamers: Season 3 (2010)
- HiFi Calypso, with Karl Zéro (2004)

=== Guest singles ===
Year	Single	Artist	Peak chart positions			Certifications (sales threshold)	Album
Year	Single	Artist	US Country	US	CAN	Certifications (sales threshold)	Album
2008	"Everybody Wants to Go to Heaven"	Kenny Chesney	1	41	49	US: Gold	Lucky Old Sun
2012	"Al Leila Ya Samra"	Mohamed Mounir	—	—	—		Arabiac Studio
"—" denotes releases that did not chart.

=== Music videos ===
Year	Video	Director
2008	"Everybody Wants to Go to Heaven" (with Kenny Chesney)	Shaun Silva
2010	"A Step for Mankind" (feat. Duane Stephenson & Bishop Lamont)	Luke Archer
2013	"Spread The Love" (with Kenny Chesney)	Shaun Silva
