= Ziggy Marley and the Melody Makers discography =

- Studio albums: 10
- Live albums: 1
- Compilation albums: 4
- Singles: 24
- Video albums: 4
- Music videos: 2

The discography of Ziggy Marley and the Melody Makers, a Jamaican reggae family group, consists of ten studio albums, one live album, four compilation albums, twenty-three singles and four video albums.

The four siblings initially came together as a musical unit in 1979 to record "Children Playing in the Streets". Bob Marley had composed the song four years earlier for his children and wanted to share this gift with children around the world. All royalties from the single were pledged to the United Nations, to aid its efforts during the International Year of the Child. Ziggy and Stephen performed together at their father's funeral on May 21, 1981, dancing alongside the I-Threes and the Wailers, during their brief homage to the great artist. Later that year, The Melody Makers released their second single, "What a Plot," which, like their debut, appeared on their late father's own Tuff Gong label. In 1984, The Melody Makers began a recording session with English producer Steve Levine that released a single, "Lying in Bed". In 1985, the group released their first album, Play the Game Right. In 1986, Hey World was released and credited to Ziggy Marley & the Melody Makers.

In 1988, the group signed to Virgin Records and released their fourth album Conscious Party. In the same year, the group released a concert DVD called "Conscious Party: Live at the Palladium". A year later, their fifth album One Bright Day was released. In 1991, the group released their sixth album Jahmekya. In 1993, the group released their final album on Virgin called, Joy and Blues.

In 1995, the group signed a record deal with Elektra and released Free Like We Want 2 B accompanied by the group's own recording label "Ghetto Youths United". In early 1997, the group released second best-of album The Best of (1988–1993). Later that year, the group released ninth album Fallen Is Babylon. In 1999, the group released their tenth and final studio album, The Spirit of Music, which peaked at #1 on the Top Reggae Albums chart. In 2000, the group released their live album Ziggy Marley & the Melody Makers Live, Vol. 1, and the concert DVD "Ziggy Marley & the Melody Makers Live" followed in May 2001.

In addition to Ziggy Marley and the Melody Maker's work, they have covered several songs from their father Bob Marley, including "Natty Dread", "Positive Vibration", "Stir It Up", "Get Up, Stand Up", "Sun Is Shining", "Africa Unite", "Could You Be Loved", and several other songs.

== Albums ==
=== Studio ===
Year	Title	Peak chart positions					Certifications
Year	Title	US	US R&B	US World	US Reggae	AUS	Certifications
1984	Children Playing: 1st studio album (unreleased); Labels: Tuff Gong, Rita Marley Music; Formats: LP	—	—	—	—	—	
1985	Play the Game Right: 2nd studio album; Labels: Tuff Gong, Rita Marley Music; Formats: CD, digital download	—	—	—	—	—	
1986	Hey World!: 3rd studio album; Labels: EMI Music; Formats: CD, digital download	94	—	—	—	—	
1988	Conscious Party: 4th studio album; Labels: Virgin; Formats: CD, digital download	23	26	—	—	34	RIAA: Platinum
1989	One Bright Day: 5th studio album; Labels: Virgin; Formats: CD, digital download	26	43	—	—	—	RIAA: Gold
1991	Jahmekya: 6th studio album; Labels: Virgin; Formats: CD, digital download	63	—	3	—	—	
1993	Joy and Blues: 7th studio album; Labels: Virgin, Ghetto Youths United; Formats: CD, digital download	178	75	5	11	—	
1995	Free Like We Want 2 B: 8th studio album; Labels: Ghetto Youths United; Formats: CD, digital download	170	—	—	9	—	
1997	Fallen Is Babylon: 9th studio album; Labels: Eletkra, Ghetto Youths United; Formats: CD, digital download	—	—	—	9	—	
1999	The Spirit of Music: 10th studio album; Labels: Elektra, Ghetto Youths United; Formats: CD, digital download	—	—	—	1	—	
"—" denotes releases that did not chart

=== Live ===
Year	Title	Peak chart positions
Year	Title	US Reggae
2000	Ziggy Marley & the Melody Makers Live, Vol. 1: Labels: Elektra; Formats: CD, digital download	5

=== Compilation ===
Year	Title	Peak chart positions
Year	Title	Top Reggae Albums
1988	The Time Has Come: The Best of Ziggy Marley & the Melody Makers: 1st compilation album; Labels: EMI Music; Formats: CD, digital download	—
1993	3-CD Box Set: 2nd compilation album; Labels: Alex; Formats: CD	—
1997	The Best of (1988–1993): 3rd compilation album; Labels: EMI Music; Formats: CD, digital download	2
2008	The Best of Ziggy Marley & the Melody Makers: 4th compilation album; Labels: Tuff Gong, Ghetto Youths United; Formats: CD, digital download	—

== Selected singles ==
Year	Title	Chart positions										Album
Year	Title	US	US Maxi	US Club	US Main. Rock	AUS	NZ	NED	BEL (FLA)	IRE	UK	Album
1979	"Children Playing In The Streets"	—	—	—	—	—	—	—	—	—	—	Play the Game Right
1982	"What a Plot"	—	—	—	—	—	—	—	—	—	—	Play the Game Right
1984	"Met Her On A Rainy Day"	—	—	—	—	—	—	—	—	—	—	singles only
1984	"Rock It Baby"	—	—	—	—	—	—	—	—	—	—	singles only
1986	"Play The Game Right"	—	—	—	—	—	—	—	—	—	—	Play the Game Right
1986	"Give a Little Love"	—	—	—	—	—	—	—	—	—	—	Hey World
1988	"Tomorrow People"	39	—	—	16	36	15	7	5	22	22	Conscious Party
1988	"Tumblin' Down"	—	1	28	—	—	—	—	—	—	84	Conscious Party
1988	"Lee & Molly"	—	—	—	—	—	—	—	—	—	—	Conscious Party
1989	"Look Who's Dancin'"	—	41	23	—	—	—	34	45	—	65	One Bright Day
1989	"One Bright Day"	—	—	—	—	—	—	—	—	—	—	One Bright Day
1991	"Good Time"	85	—	—	—	—	—	78	—	—	—	Jahmekya
1991	"Kozmik"	—	—	—	—	—	—	11	44	—	98	Jahmekya
1993	"Brothers and Sisters"	—	—	—	—	—	45	—	—	—	—	Joy and Blues
1995	"Power to Move Ya"	—	—	13	—	—	—	—	—	—	—	Free Like We Want 2 B
1995	"Free Like We Want 2 B"	—	—	—	—	—	—	—	—	—	—	Free Like We Want 2 B
1997	"People Get Ready"	—	—	29	—	—	—	—	—	—	—	Fallen Is Babylon
1998	"Everyone Wants to Be"	—	—	16	—	—	—	—	—	—	—	Fallen Is Babylon
"—" denotes releases that did not chart or were not released.

== Bob Marley cover songs ==
- "African Herbsman"
- "Africa Unite"
- "Could You Be Loved"
- "I Shot the Sheriff
- "Get Up, Stand Up"
- "Jamming"
- "Natty Dread"
- "One Love/People Get Ready
- "Positive Vibration"
- "Rainbow Country"
- "Rat Race"
- "Small Axe"
- "Stir It Up"
- "Sun Is Shining"
- "Time Will Tell"

== Concert DVDs ==
- 1988: Conscious Party: Live at the Palladium
- 1996: Marley Magic: Tribute to Bob Marley
- 1999: One Love: The Bob Marley All-Star Tribute
- 2001: Ziggy Marley and the Melody Makers Live
- 2008: Africa Unite: A Celebration of Bob Marley's 60th Birthday
