= Sharon Marley =

Jamaican singer (born 1964)

- Born: Sharon Althea Marley; 23 November 1964 (age 61); Kingston, Jamaica
- Occupations: Singer; musician; songwriter; director
- Years active: 1979–present
- Spouse: Ekow Alabi Savage (m. 2014) Peter Prendergast (divorced)
- Children: 4, including Donisha
- Parent(s): Rita Marley (mother); Bob Marley (adoptive father)
- Relatives: Expand list: Cedella Marley (half-sister); Ziggy Marley (half-brother); Stephen Marley (half-brother); Nico Marley (nephew); Cedella Booker (grandmother); Skip Marley (nephew); Jo Mersa Marley (nephew)
- Musical career
- Genres: Reggae; R&B
- Instruments: Vocals; percussion
- Labels: Gong Gyal; Tuff Gong Worldwide
- Formerly of: Ziggy Marley and the Melody Makers
- Website: sharonmarley.com

Sharon Althea Marley (born 23 November 1964) is a Jamaican singer-songwriter. The first child of Rita Marley and adopted daughter of Bob Marley, Marley first gained recognition in the family group Ziggy Marley & the Melody Makers. After the group disbanded in 2002, Marley went on music hiatus and became head of A&R for the record label Ghetto Youths United. She founded the Total Care Learning Centre (TCLC); a child-care facility. She became the director of the Rita Marley Foundation.

She returned to her music career with the release of her debut single "Just One More Morning" in 2021. In March 2026, she released her first solo album, Firebird on her record label Gong Gyal Entertainment. The album spawned the singles "Steppah", "Firebird", and "Island".

Sharon Marley is recognized as one of first female Jamaicans to achieve a platinum record in the United States. She has sold over 2 million records worldwide. She is the recipient of three Grammy Awards.

== Early life ==
Sharon Althea Marley was born in Kingston, Jamaica, on November 23, 1964. Her mother, Rita Marley (née Anderson), is a singer and member of the I-Threes, while the identity of her biological father was never publicly disclosed. After Rita married Jamaican singer and musician Bob Marley in 1966, he later adopted Sharon as his own child. Sharon's younger siblings are also musicians. Her maternal grandfather was Leroy Anderson, a saxophonist.

Sharon was raised within a Rastafari culture and faith. At the age of seven, she was enrolled in voice lessons and piano classes as well as dance classes. After graduating from high school, her first job was working as a secretary at an adult education school. She later attained a degree in Business administration.

== Career ==
=== 1979–2002: Early career and The Melody Makers ===
In 1979, Marley formed the family group The Melody Makers alongside her younger siblings Cedella Marley, Ziggy Marley, and Stephen Marley. The group debuted in 1979 with the release of their single "Children Playing in the Streets". After the death of their father Bob Marley in May 1981, the group released their second single "What a Plot" in 1982. Their debut album, Play the Game Right, was released in 1985 to minor success.

Following the group's name change to Ziggy Marley and the Melody Makers, they released their second album Hey World! in 1986 on EMI Records. In the same year, she served as curator for the Bob Marley Museum. The group's third album, Conscious Party, was released in April 1988 on Virgin Records and peaked at number twenty-three on the US Billboard 200, later achieving platinum status in the United States. The record spawned the singles "Tomorrow People", "Tumblin' Down"; both of which became international hits. Conscious Party won a Grammy Award for Best Reggae Album at the 31st Annual Grammy Awards in 1989. Conscious Party became their best-selling album, having sold 1.5 million copies worldwide. Ziggy Marley and the Melody Makers' fourth studio album, One Bright Day, was released in July 1989; it peaked at number twenty-six on the Billboard 200 and eventually selling over 500,000 copies in the United States. In the same year, she made her theatrical film debut, portraying Jody in The Mighty Quinn. She recorded two songs "The Mighty Quinn" and "I'm Hurting Inside" for the film's soundtrack.

In July 1999, the group released their final studio album Spirit of Music, which peaked number one on the US Reggae Albums chart. Following the disbandment of the group, Marley went on a music hiatus and pursued other projects.

=== 2004–2020: Total Care Learning Centre ===
In August 2004, she founded a child-care facility and school called the Total Care Learning Centre (TCLC) on Lady Musgrave Road in Kingston, Jamaica. The facility is known for introducing the Montessori method of learning. In 2008, Marley reunited with the members of Ziggy Marley and the Melody Makers for the Africa Unite concert in Ocho Rios. The performance was released on film titled Africa Unite: A Celebration of Bob Marley's 60th Birthday. In October 2010, Marley was arrested for allegedly disciplining an autistic six-year child at Total Care Learning Centre. The case was eventually settled.

=== 2021–present: Firebird ===
In August 2021, she released her debut solo single "Just One More Morning", a cover version of her mother's song. Following the positive reviews of "Just One More Morning", she released a follow-up single "Butterflies in the Sky" in June 2022. In February 2024, Marley released a single titled "Steppah". The song, which features a guest appearance from Jamaican deejay Big Youth, garnered positive reviews. In August 2024, she performed a tribute concert to her parents called An Evening with Sharon Marley: Rita and Bob Marley Tribute Concert and Storytelling. The performance preceded her debut studio album, Firebird, which was released on 20 March 2026 on her own label Gong Gyal Entertainment. The album is a mixture of reggae, blues, jazz, and R&B while its production was handled by a range of producers, including Leroy Romans, Nicholas Davis, Michael Bennett, and her son Ingemar Prendergast. The album's second single, "Firebird" was released in January 2025.

== Philanthropy ==
In 2015, she raised and donated money to Konkonuru Basic School in Ghana. In 2021, Marley became the director of the Rita Marley Foundation. Proceeds from her debut single "Just One More Morning" were used to benefit the Rita Marley scholarship fund by the Rita Marley Foundation. As the foundation's director, she traveled to Ghana and oversaw an aid effort that provided electricity, an elderly clinic, and remodeled school for Konkonuru.

== Personal life ==
In the 1980s, she married her first husband Jamaican football official Peter Prendergast. Sharon has four children named Donisha Prendergast, Ingermar, Matthew, and Peter-Shane. She divorced Prendergast. In 2006, she announced she was baptised in the Ethiopian Orthodox Church. In May 2014, she married Ghanaian musician Ekow Alabi Savage.

== Legacy ==
Sharon Marley has sold over two million records as a member of Ziggy Marley & the Melody Makers. Along with her younger sister Cedella Marley, they are recognized as the first women born in Jamaica to achieve a platinum record in the United States. Sharon and Cedella also share the record for most Grammy Award wins and nominations by a female artist in the category of Best Reggae Album. In March 2024, Marley was the honored at the Queens of Reggae Island Honorary Ceremony (QORIHC).

== Discography ==
Albums

Title	Details
Firebird	Released: 20 March 2026; Label: Gong Gyal Entertainment; Format: Digital download, streaming

Singles

- "Just One More Morning" (2021)
- "Butterflies in the Sky" (2022)
- "Steppah" (2024)
- "Firebird" (2025)
- "Island" (2026)

== Filmography ==
Year	Title	Role
1989	The Mighty Quinn	Jody

== Awards and nominations ==
Award	Year	Category	Work	Result	Ref.
Grammy Awards	1986	Best Reggae Album	Play the Game Right	Nominated	
Grammy Awards	1989	Best Reggae Album	Conscious Party	Won	
Grammy Awards	1990	Best Reggae Album	One Bright Day	Won	
Grammy Awards	1992	Best Reggae Album	Jahmekya	Nominated	
Grammy Awards	1994	Best Reggae Album	Joy and Blues	Nominated	
Grammy Awards	1996	Best Reggae Album	Free Like We Want 2 B	Nominated	
Grammy Awards	1998	Best Reggae Album	Fallen Is Babylon	Won	
