= Earl "Chinna" Smith =

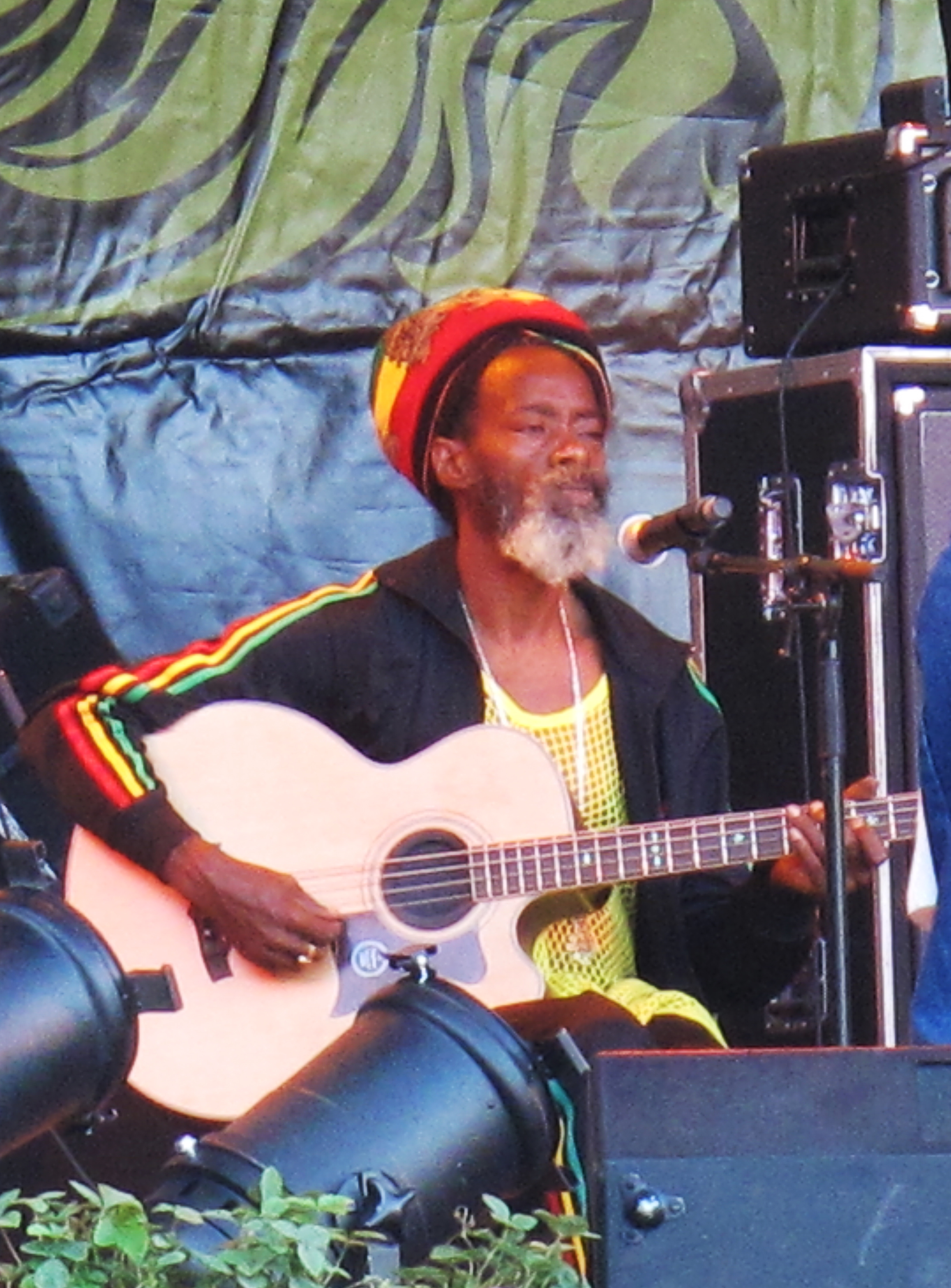

Background information
- Also known as: Earl Flute
- Born: Earl Smith; 6 August 1955 (age 71)
- Origin: Kingston, Jamaica
- Genres: Reggae
- Instruments: Guitar, vocals, bass guitar, percussions
- Years active: 1968–present
- Labels: High Times, Makasound
- Website: https://binghistramovement.com/

Earl "Chinna" Smith (born 6 August 1955), a.k.a. Earl Flute-Melchizedek the High Priest, is a Jamaican guitarist active since the late 1960s. He is well known for his work with the Soul Syndicate band and as guitarist for Bob Marley & the Wailers, amongst others, and has recorded with many reggae artists, appearing on more than 500 albums, as well as playing on thousands of exclusive sound system dubplates, 45 singles and discomixes. He has played on releases from Augustus Pablo's Rockers All Stars, Niney the Observer's All Stars, Joe Gibbs (producer) & The Professionals, Errol Thompson (sound engineer) and Clive Chin's Impact All Stars, Bunny Lee's The Aggrovators, Lee "Scratch" Perry's band The Upsetters, and many more.

== Biography ==
Smith was born 6 August 1955, and raised by family friends in the Greenwich Farm area of Kingston. His father and godfather were both sound system owners, his father's, Smith's, operated by Bunny Lee. Earl tried to emulate them using a toy sound system, leading to his nickname of "Tuner" (after a hi-fi amplifier), which was corrupted to "Chuner" and later "Chinna". Smith became interested in guitar as a teenager and made his own from sardine cans and fishing line. He formed a vocal group with his friend Earl Johnson (who later recorded as Earl Zero) and another youth, and they regularly sat in on sessions by the Soul Syndicate band. Smith was taught the basics of guitar by the band's guitarist Cleon Douglas, and became so adept at playing the band's repertoire that he was asked to join the band when Douglas emigrated to the United States.

In the late 1960s and early 1970s, Smith was the guitarist in Bunny Lee's house band that became known as The Aggrovators. He also recorded a few vocal tracks under the pseudonym Earl Flute for producer Keith Hudson. Smith also played in Lee "Scratch" Perry's band The Upsetters.

In 1976, Smith joined Bob Marley & the Wailers, appearing on the Rastaman Vibration album, the Live at the Roxy album, and backed Marley at his historic One Love Peace Concert performance in 1978. In addition, Smith played guitar on bed tracks recorded in Jamaica that were ultimately used on the Exodus album, namely The Heathen, Three Little Birds, and One Love, as well as the outtake Roots. Smith also appeared on the Survival album, contributing rhythm guitar and percussion to the track One Drop, and on the Uprising album, playing guitar on We And Dem, Real Situation, and Forever Loving Jah. In addition, Smith backed Marley on the Catch a Fire outtake High Tide or Low Tide, as part of Soul Syndicate, and overdubbed rhythm guitar on the live album Babylon by Bus. Finally, Smith played guitar on the tracks Blackman Redemption, Rastaman Live Up, and I Know, which appeared on Confrontation. Smith later worked with Bob Marley's sons Julian and Ziggy, touring internationally with the latter and playing on his Conscious Party album.

In 1980, Smith launched his own record label High Times, releasing records by Soul Syndicate, Prince Alla, and Freddie McGregor, and also formed the High Times Players (which featured Augustus Pablo and Dean Fraser amongst others) who acted as backing band to Mutabaruka. Smith also co-produced Mutabaruka's 1983 debut studio album Check It! The dub version of the album, credited to Smith, was released in 2004.

In 1986, Smith appeared as a member of Ernest Reed's (Jimmy Cliff) back-up band in the reggae-themed comedy Club Paradise.

In the 2000s, he worked on a series of albums recorded in his yard in St. Andrew, featuring veteran musicians and singers including Cedric Myton, Linval Thompson, Junior Murvin, and Kiddus I, this Inna de Yard series released by the French label Makasound. Two of these volumes feature Smith as lead musician, credited to "Earl Chinna Smith and Idrens", these released in 2008 and 2009.

In 2009, Smith recorded an instrumental version of The Heptones' album Heptones on Top as a tribute to the band, along with Lebert "Gibby" Morrison; they had worked on the album for more than ten years.

As well as working with many of the top Jamaican artists, Smith also recorded with artists such as Lauryn Hill (on The Miseducation of Lauryn Hill) and Amy Winehouse (on Frank).

In October 2013, it was announced that he was to be awarded a Silver Musgrave Medal later that month by the Institute of Jamaica.

In 2017, Smith worked with the Jamaican reggae singer, songwriter and producer Emmanuel Anebsa on his EP Black People.

In 2022, Earl Chinna Smith's InnadeYard Binghistra Movement, Surfing Medicine International 501(c)(3), and the Charles Town Maroons produced and released a benefit album online and as a limited edition vinyl LP printed by Third Man Pressing called Maroon Songs: Born Free, Live Free, Ever Free, featuring Earl Chinna Smith, Errol Flabba Holt, Tyrone Downie and many other iconic Reggae artists and Maroon Drummers.

== Personal life ==
Smith's sons and daughters have followed him into a music career, with Jhamiela Smith (vocalist), Neosulann Smith (vocalist), Maria Smith (vocalist), Earl Smith Jr. (vocalist, studio engineer), JahJah (born Jahmai) (vocalist), and Ashea (born Itayi) (deejay), and his last born, named from his stage name "Chinna" Chynnah Smith.

== Solo album discography ==
- Sticky Fingers (1977), Third World
- Home Grown (1991), High Times
- Dub It! (2004), Nature Sounds
- Inna De Yard (2008), Makasound – Earl Chinna Smith & Idrens
- Inna De Yard vol. 2 (2009), Makasound – Earl Chinna Smith & Idrens
- Guitars On Top (2009), Grass Yard – with Lebert "Gibby" Morrison

== Artists recorded ==
- Follow My Mind – Jimmy Cliff (Reprise Records, 1975)
- King Tubbys Meets Rockers Uptown – Augustus Pablo (Clocktower Records, 1976)
- Reggae Thing – Inner Circle (Capitol Records, 1976)
- Give Thankx – Jimmy Cliff (Warner Bros. Records, 1978)
- Visions of Dennis Brown – Dennis Brown (Joe Gibbs, 1978)
- I Am the Living – Jimmy Cliff (WEA, 1980)
- The Power and the Glory – Jimmy Cliff (CBS Records, 1983)
- Cliff Hanger – Jimmy Cliff (CBS Records, 1985)
- Slow Down – Dennis Brown (Greensleves, 1985)
- Play the Game Right – Ziggy Marley and the Melody Makers (EMI, 1985)
- Hey World! – Ziggy Marley and the Melody Makers (EMI, 1986)
- Conscious Party – Ziggy Marley and the Melody Makers (EMI, 1988)
- One Bright Day – Ziggy Marley and the Melody Makers (EMI, 1989)
- Don't Call Me Buckwheat – Garland Jeffreys (BMG, 1991)
- Jahmekya – Ziggy Marley and the Melody Makers (EMI, 1991)
- Breakout – Jimmy Cliff (JRS Records, 1992)
- Songs of Bob Marley – Carlene Davis (Eko Records, 1993)
- Light My Fire – Dennis Brown (Heartbeat Records, 1994)
- Free Like We Want 2 B – Ziggy Marley and the Melody Makers (Elektra Records, 1995)
- Spirit of Music – Ziggy Marley and the Melody Makers (Elektra Records, 1999)
- Dragonfly – Ziggy Marley (Private Music, 2003)
- Frank – Amy Winehouse (Island Records, 2003)
- Mind Body & Soul – Joss Stone (S-Curve, 2004)
