= Live Forever (Bob Marley album) =

Live album by The Wailers
- Released: February 1, 2011
- Recorded: September 23, 1980
- Venue: The Stanley Theatre, Pittsburgh, Pennsylvania
- Genre: Reggae
- Length: 90:40
- Label: Tuff Gong / Island

The Wailers chronology
B Is for Bob (2009)	Live Forever (2011)	In Dub, Vol. 1 (2012)

Live Forever: September 23, 1980 • Stanley Theatre • Pittsburgh, PA is a live album by Bob Marley & The Wailers released in February 2011, recorded at Pittsburgh's Stanley Theatre during the Uprising Tour to support their, then, latest album of the same name.

== Overview ==
This was Marley's last concert before his death in 1981. "Get Up Stand Up", Bob Marley's last performed song, was not found until 2000 by Bob Marley Archivists James Wilson and Jack Low. The taper at the show was on the balcony and had 2 tapes for the show. The original soundboard tape was cut during the song "Work" due to it only being a 90-minute tape.

== Track listing ==
Disc one

1. Greetings – 0:31
2. "Natural Mystic" – 4:40
3. "Positive Vibration" – 4:47
4. "Burnin' and Lootin'" – 3:35
5. "Them Belly Full (But We Hungry)" – 3:47
6. "The Heathen" – 4:25
7. "Running Away" – 2:50
8. "Crazy Baldhead" – 5:02
9. "War" / "No More Trouble" – 6:03
10. "Zimbabwe" – 3:39
11. "Zion Train" – 3:50
12. "No Woman, No Cry" – 6:05

Disc two

1. "Jamming" – 4:31
2. "Exodus" – 7:01
3. "Redemption Song" – 4:07
4. "Coming in from the Cold" – 3:37
5. "Could You Be Loved" – 7:40
6. "Is This Love" – 3:37
7. "Work" – 4:15
8. "Get Up, Stand Up" – 6:38

== Personnel ==
- Bob Marley – vocals, guitar
- Carlton Barrett – drums
- Aston "Family Man" Barrett – bass guitar
- Junior Marvin – lead guitar
- Al Anderson – lead guitar
- Alvin "Seeco" Patterson – percussion
- Ian Winters – keyboards
- Tyrone Downie – keyboards
- "The I Threes": Judy Mowatt, Marcia Griffiths, Rita Marley – backing vocals

== Personnel ==
- UMe A&R: Jamie Feldman and Harry Weinger
- Mastered by Kevin Reeves at Universal Mastering Studios-East
- Production Manager: Shannon Steckloff
- UMe Business Affairs: Beatriz Pace
- Product Manager: Adam Starr
- Special thanks to: Rita Marley, Cedella Marley, Ziggy Marley, and the Marley family.
