= Julian Marley =

British-Jamaican reggae musician (born 1975)

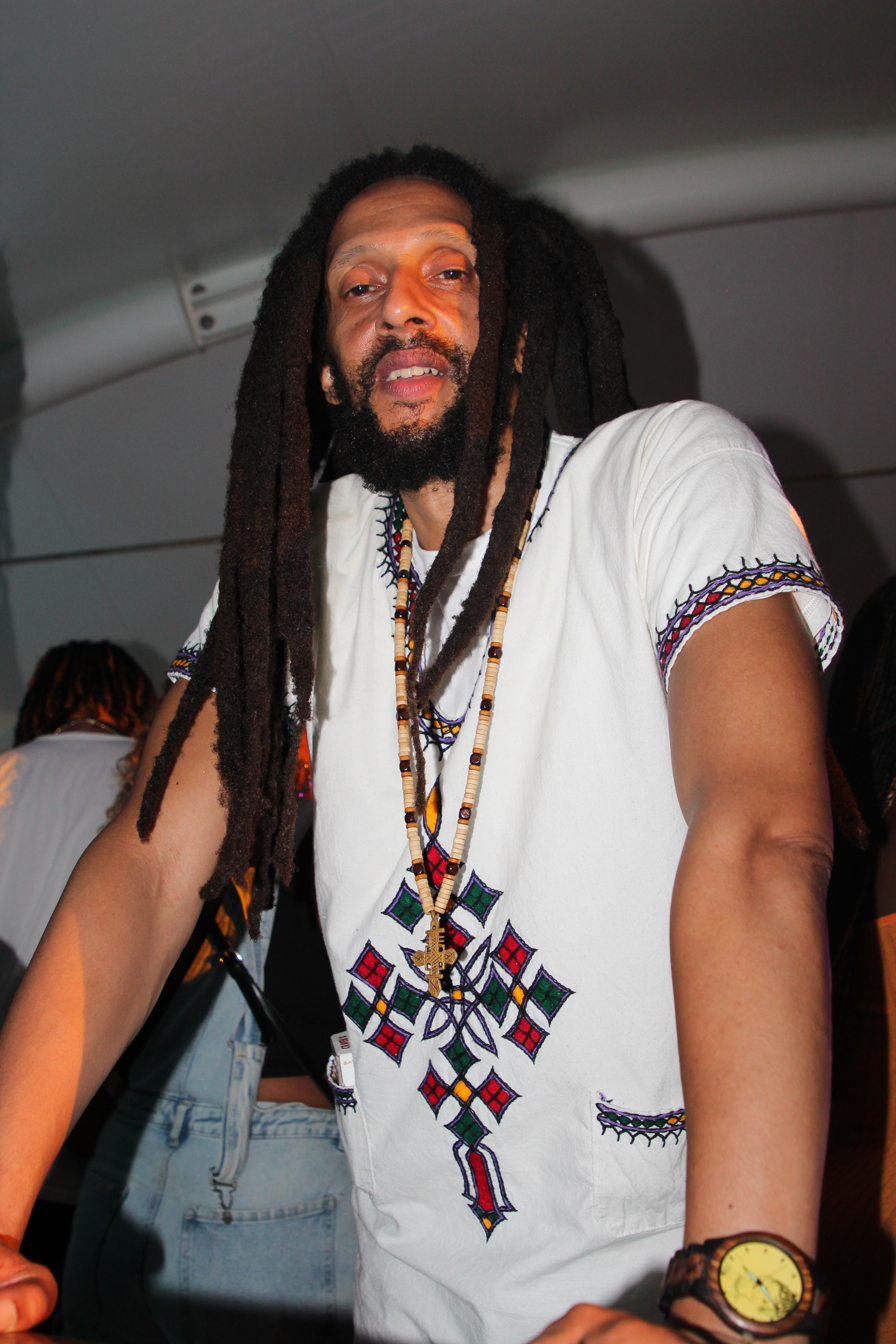
- Marley in 2025 on the JamRock Cruise.

Background information
- Also known as: Ju Ju Royal
- Born: Julian Ricardo Marley; 4 June 1975 (age 51); London, England
- Genres: Roots reggae
- Occupations: Musician; singer-songwriter; guitarist; philanthropist; record producer
- Years active: 1993–present
- Labels: Tuff Gong, Ghetto Youth International, Lightyear
- Website: julianmarley.com

Julian Ricardo Marley (born 4 June 1975) is a British-Jamaican reggae musician, songwriter, record producer, and humanitarian. He is the son of reggae music icon Bob Marley, and Lucy Pounder. In 2024, he received a Grammy Award for Best Reggae Album for his collaboration album with Antaeus, Colors of Royal (2023).

== Biography ==
Marley was born on 4 June 1975 in London. He was interested in music from an early age, having learned to play the keyboard, drums, bass and guitar. Along with his paternal half-brothers Ziggy Marley and Stephen Marley, he became involved with Ghetto Youth International, a production company, in 1989. Marley released a solo album, Lion in the Morning, in 1996 and embarked on a world tour. He and his half-brother Damian Marley toured with the Lollapalooza festival in 1997. His second album, A Time and Place, was released in 2003. In 2008, the Jamaican government invited Marley and the Uprising band to represent Jamaica and perform at the Beijing Olympics. His third album, Awake (released in 2009), was nominated for a prestigious Grammy Award in the Best Reggae Album category. In 2011, he participated in Mawazine festival that took place at Rabat, Morocco. In January 2013, he performed a reggae concert in Dhaka, Bangladesh. In August 2013, he performed at the Fêtes de Genève in Geneva, Switzerland.

== Early life ==
Julian was born out of wedlock outside of Bob's marriage to singer Rita Marley. He is the only one of Bob Marley's sons born in the UK. Marley was raised by his mother, Lucy Pounder, in England, and travelled frequently to Jamaica to visit his brothers. Growing up, he was surrounded by a musical atmosphere, which helped him quickly develop and adapt to the musical lifestyle. At an early age, he taught himself how to master the bass, drums, guitar, and keyboards. By the age of five, Marley had recorded his first demo at the Marley family home in Kingston, Jamaica. While growing up, Marley lived between England and Jamaica and eventually he found himself creating a home base in Miami, Florida, where the family owned their own studio called The Lions Den. Although Marley was a Jamaican at heart, he is said to credit his British upbringing as a major influence on his music. As Marley reflects: "I feel privileged to be part of the musical roots that my father, Bob Marley, laid in England. I look forward to relate the cultural gifts and musical creations that he has bestowed on me." In 1993, Marley moved to Jamaica to be closer to his brothers. By making that move, it inspired the Marley Brothers to form their own musical path. They created the group called the Ghetto Youths Crew which was formed by Julian, Stephen, Damian, and Kymani Marley. The project showed to be such a success that the brothers toured the United States for three years. Marley, also known as "Ju Ju" Marley will remain a spiritual soul with a musical visionary that he will embark on an international mission. Marley stated, "I do not plan the next step, I just continue on with Jah Works and somehow things will just come together naturally that way."

== Musical career ==
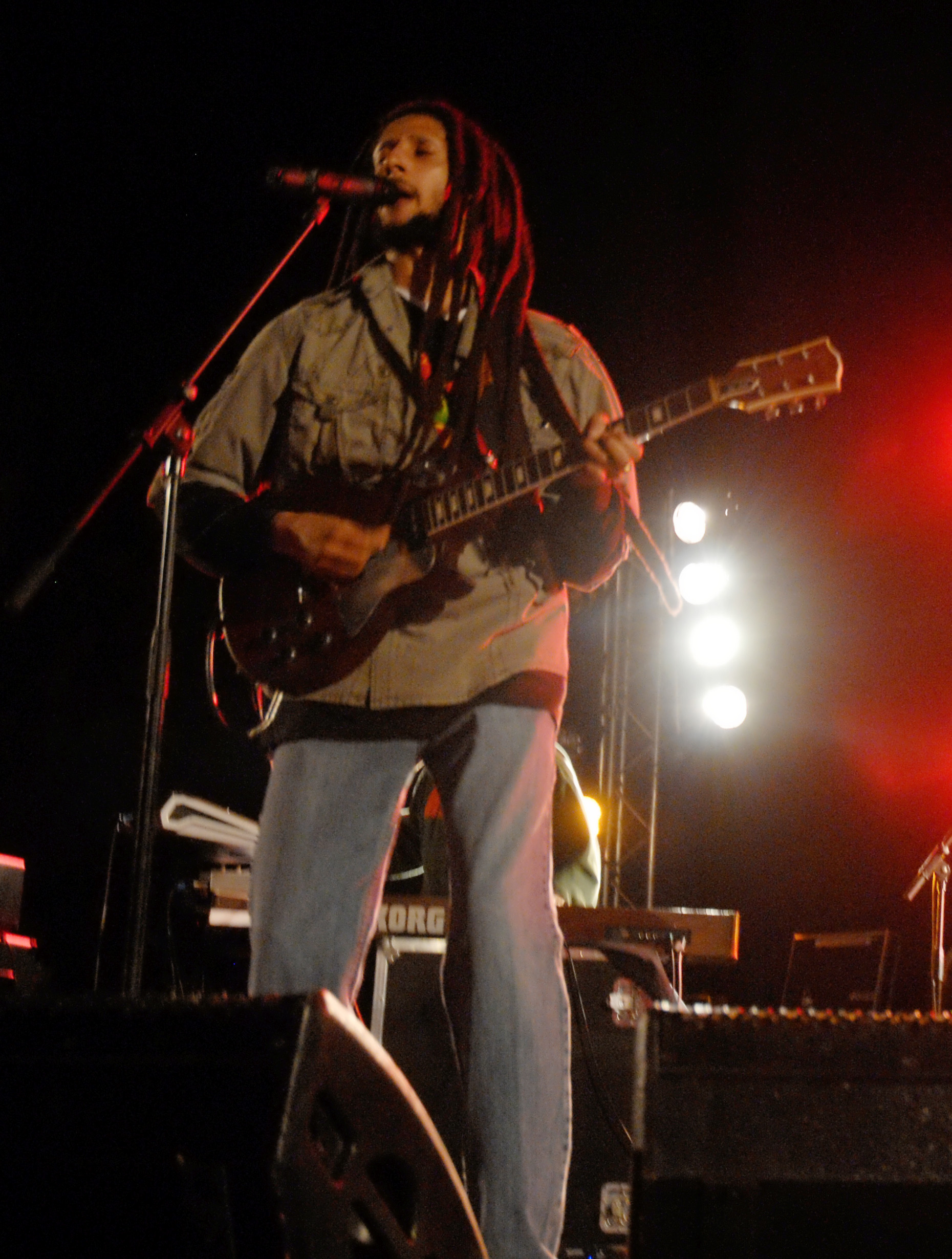
Marley in 2010

In 1996, Marley released his debut album titled Lion in the Morning. That first album helped launch him into the public eye. The album was recorded at Tuff Gong Studios in Kingston, Jamaica. Marley created Lion in the Morning to reflect on his roots and heritage which he is very proud of. The album features a wide range of popular musicians from Owen "Dreddie" Reid, Earl "Chinna" Smith, Tyron Downie, Stephen Marley, Cedella Marley and Sharon Marley, among others. The record was followed by a successful international tour with The Uprising. Some of the tour stops from his tour were Jamaica's Sumfest and Sunsplash Show, Marley Magic family performance at Central Park Summer Stage Concert Series in New York, and also territories like Brazil, Japan, and Mexico. Marley also got the opportunity to work with his brother Damian at the Lollapalooza Tour.

During these times in Jamaica, Marley studied a lot of legendary veterans he looked up to, including Aston "Family Man" Barrett, Earl "Wire" Lindo, Tyrone Downie, and Earl Smith, by all whom he was inspired. Marley wrote two un-released songs at this time, "Uprising" and "What They Did Wrong", in response to the accident of his companion who is also the Wailers' drummer, Carlton Barrett's, murder outside his home in Jamaica. Subsequently, Marley formed a reggae band called The Uprising, which was inspired by his song, made up of young Jamaican musicians. The Uprising and Marley went on to open up for his brother Ziggy Marley and his band, The Melody Makers. He also got the chance to perform with the Wailers, which included the son of Carlton Barrett who played the drums. Marley contributed to a vast range of musical elements on Lauryn Hill's album, The Miseducation of Lauryn Hill, which became an award-winning album. They recorded the album on Tuff Gong Records in Jamaica while Marley played the guitar on some tracks. During 1999, Marley went back to the studio alongside his brothers Damian and Stephen and started to produce the platinum-selling remix album Chant Down Babylon, which had various rock and hip-hop artists covering Bob Marley's and The Wailers songs.

Julian Marley received two Grammy Award nominations.

== Philanthropy ==
Marley is a humanitarian and continues to build charitable missions and still contributes to the Ghetto Youths Foundation in the spirit of his father. He enjoys giving back to the youths in various communities whether it is playing with the children at the football fields in London or offering his free time with benefit concerts. In February 2010, Marley and his brother Kymani Marley produced a "Miami for Haiti" benefit show which raised money towards the Haitian relief efforts alongside the Ghetto Youths Foundation by their side.

Marley was 13 years old when he travelled to Israel in 1988. He views himself as a very religious man who follows the faiths of Rastafari and Christianity. He was in the country to perform and he states that "it was spiritually uplifting" to be able to see where Christ came from. Many of the Marley family have visited Jerusalem before, but this was the first time Marley was invited to perform at the Barby Club in Tel Aviv during his global tour. He didn't object to performing in Israel, which is accused of committing genocide and practising apartheid and colonialism, because he claimed he wanted to tackle issues in a different way while during that time there were many boycotts of the country. He states: "It's great to travel all around the world because there is no place that the message of love is not needed." Marley believes and expressed good vibes and intentions. He is always speaking of spreading the message of love through his music. Marley believes the importance to travel the world and spreading love through his religion. While he travelled through Europe, he used his music to be an antidote to some of the hatred and terrorism that has occurred there.

== Current ==
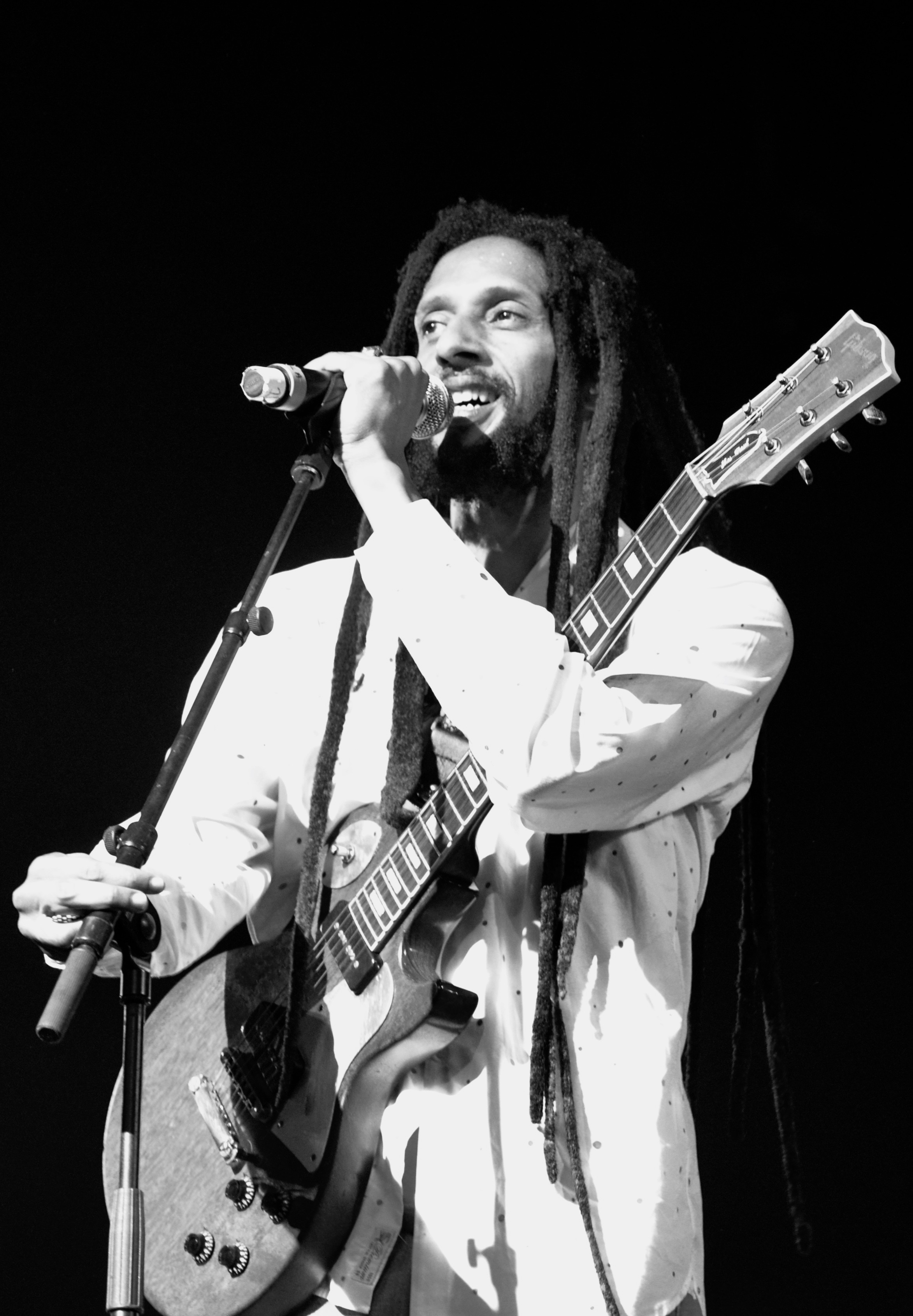
Marley in concert at Sfinks Festival in 2018

Marley and his brothers officially incorporated Ghetto Youths International Inc. in 2002. The label allowed all the brothers to work closely with each other on musical collaborations. This also allowed them to produce and release various works featuring many artists to include their own material for the Ghetto Youths imprint. It successfully carried on the Marley tradition, which lets music communicate to a global audience. The following year, Marley got the opportunity to unite and perform with all his brothers at the Roots Rock Reggae Festival in the United States. Along with the Marley family they also went to perform at the "Africa Unite" in Ethiopia in 2005, in Ghana in 2006, and Jamaica in 2008. With the invitation of the Jamaican government, The Uprising and Julian Marley performed at the 2008 Olympic Games in Beijing, China and celebrated with Usain Bolt, a Gold medal-winner runner from Jamaica.

His fourth album, As I Am, was released on 25 January 2019, and received a nomination for a Grammy Award in the Best Reggae Album category. In 2022, he and Hasidic hip-hop artist Moshe Reuven released the song "Say", which was critically acclaimed, having been highlighted by places such as Rolling Stone. At the 66 Annual Grammy Awards, Julian won a Grammy for Reggae Album of the Year.

Julian was welcomed by the Ethiopian government to Ethiopia in October 2021, and he is credited with initiating the No More Movement. The movement was later accused of supporting the Tigray War which resulted in war crimes.

== Personal life ==
Marley followed in his father's footsteps and is a devout Rastafarian who uses his music to inspire his life and spirituality. Marley had a daughter, born in 2007, who died in 2019 as a result of a brain tumour. He shares his birthday with his nephew Skip Marley.

== Discography ==
- Lion in the Morning (1996)
- A Time & Place (2003)
- Awake (2009)
- As I Am (2019)
