= Hey World! =

Studio album by Ziggy Marley and the Melody Makers
- Released: 1986
- Genre: Reggae
- Label: EMI Records (UK); EMI America Records (US); Rita Marley Music/Tuff Gong (Jamaica)
- Producer: Ashley "Grub" Cooper, Ricky Walters, Tyrone Downie, David Marley

Ziggy Marley and the Melody Makers chronology
Play the Game Right (1985)	Hey World! (1986)	The Time Has Come: The Best of Ziggy Marley & the Melody Makers (1988)

Professional ratings
Review scores
Source	Rating
AllMusic	4/5 stars
The Encyclopedia of Popular Music	2/5 stars

Hey World! is the second album by Ziggy Marley and the Melody Makers, released in 1986.

== Production ==
Credited to Ziggy Marley and the Melody Makers (the family band consisting Marley siblings Ziggy, Stephen, Sharon and Cedella), Ziggy and Stephen Marley shared the songwriting and singing. The album was produced by David Marley ("Ziggy"), Tyrone Downie, Ricky Walters, and Grub Cooper.

== Critical reception ==
AllMusic wrote that "the song arrangements and production may sound terribly dated today, but the strength of the songwriting, by both Ziggy and the fast maturing Stephen, and the pair's emotive vocal deliveries still pack a powerful punch and a keen vision." Trouser Press called the album "wonderful," writing that "the Melody Makers bend delightfully light reggae grooves to new stylistic ends." The Los Angeles Times wrote that Ziggy's "social and political commentaries bristle with informed insights, pointed observations and pithy pleas—all rather amazing from someone still in his teens."

== Track listing ==
1. "Give a Little Love" (Albert Hammond, Diane Warren)
2. "Get Up Jah Jah Children"
3. "Hey World!"
4. "Fight to Survive"
5. "Freedom Road"
6. "Say People"
7. "666"
8. "Police Brutality"
9. "Lord We a Come"
10. "Reggae Revolution"

== Personnel ==
- Ziggy Marley - vocals, guitar, percussion, synthesizer, backing vocals
- Stephen Marley - vocals, backing vocals
- Earl "Chinna" Smith, Jimmy Haynes, Ricky Walters, Steve Golding - guitar
- Alvin Ewen, Robbie Shakespeare - bass guitar
- Sly Dunbar - drums
- Ashley "Grub" Cooper - drums, piano
- Robbie Lyn, Tyrone Downie - piano
- Andrew P. Richardson - saxophone
- Charles E. Beasley - trumpet
- Cedella Marley, Sharon Marley - backing vocals
- Rita Marley - executive producer
