= Play the Game Right =

Studio album by Ziggy Marley and the Melody Makers
- Released: 1985
- Studio: Tuff Gong Recording Studios, Kingston, Jamaica
- Genre: Reggae
- Label: EMI Records
- Producer: Ashley "Grub" Cooper, David Marley, Richard Walters, Tyrone Downie

Ziggy Marley and the Melody Makers chronology
Children Playing (1979)	Play the Game Right (1985)	Hey World! (1986)

Professional ratings
Review scores
Source	Rating
AllMusic	4/5 stars
The Encyclopedia of Popular Music	3/5 stars

Play the Game Right is the debut album by Ziggy Marley and the Melody Makers, released in 1985. The album was executive produced by Rita Marley.

The album was nominated for a Grammy.

== Critical reception ==
AllMusic called Play the Game Right "an excellent album, and a formidable debut," praising the "clean sound that balances a rootsy feel with a lilting poppy edge." Trouser Press called it "attractive and surprisingly accomplished for such young musicians."

== Track listing ==
All tracks composed by David "Ziggy" Marley; except where indicated

1. "Naah Leggo"
2. "What a Plot"
3. "Play the Game Right"
4. "Aiding and Abetting"
5. "Revelation" (Ziggy Marley, Richard Booker)
6. "Children Playing in the Streets" (Bob Marley)
7. "Reggae Is Now" (Live)
8. "Unuh Nuh Listen Yet" (Ziggy Marley, Constantine "Vision" Walker)
9. "Rising Sun"
10. "Natty Dread Rampage"

== Personnel ==
- Ziggy Marley - vocals, guitar, percussion
- Chinna, Richard Walters, Steve Golding - acoustic guitar
- Aston Barrett, Owen "Dreadie" Reid, Richard Walter - bass
- Ashley "Grub" Cooper, Carlton Barrett - drums
- Ashley "Grub" Cooper, Harry "T" Powell, Steve Golding, Sticky - percussion
- "Wire" Lindo, Tyrone Downie - piano, organ
- Ashey "Grub" Cooper, Dean Fraser, Glen DaCosta - saxophone
- David Madden, Junior "Chico" Chin, Seymour Powell - trumpet
- Calvin "Bubbles" Cameron, Everald Gayle, Ronald "Nambo" Robinson - trombone
- Cedella Marley, Sharon Marley, Stephen Marley - backing vocals

Technical

- Rita Marley - executive producer
- Errol Brown, Scientist - engineers
