= Donisha Prendergast =

Jamaican activist & filmmaker (born 1984)

- Born: 29 December 1984 (age 41); Kingston, Jamaica
- Education: Howard University (BA), Toronto Metropolitan University (BFA)
- Occupation: Filmmaker (Documentary)
- Relatives: Bob Marley, Ziggy Marley, Sharon Marley, Peter Prendergast, Cedella Marley, Stephen Marley, Ziggy Marley and the Melody Makers, Lauryn Hill
- Website: hovnow.com

Donisha Prendergast (born 29 December 1984) is a Jamaican filmmaker and activist. Her on-screen acting work includes female lead in Canadian Screen Award-winning films Akilla's Escape (2020) alongside co-star poet Saul Williams as well as Black Bodies (2020) alongside her husband, visual artist Komi Olafimihan. Her documentary work includes The Story of God - Season 2, Ep2 (2018) with Academy Award winner Morgan Freeman, and Rasta, A Soul's Journey (2013).

== Career ==
=== Early life ===
Prendergast is the granddaughter of reggae singers Bob Marley and Rita Marley and daughter of Sharon Marley and Peter Prendergast. As a child, she toured with her mother Sharon Marley, a member of Ziggy Marley & the Melody Makers.

Prendergast began her career acting and the theatre, studying at Howard University where she majored in Theater Arts before continuing studies in Film & Digital Production, earning a BFA in Fine Arts from Toronto Metropolitan University (formerly Ryerson University).

In 2005, her grandmother Rita Marley introduced her to another kind of stage in Ethiopia as a youth ambassador for the Bob & Rita Marley Foundation's Mission: Bob Marley's 60th birthday celebrations and the Africa Unite Youth Symposiums. She began a career as a speaker and cultural ambassador taking her much of the Caribbean, Europe, Africa and North America. With Free the Children, she built a school for girls in the Mara Masaai region in Kenya.

In 2010, Donisha became one of the founding directors of NGO Manifesto Jamaica, an organization committed to global community work with special focus on healing works in Jamaica, especially with the youth of Faces of Tivoli Gardens Youth Organization, who mentored since the violent incursion of May 2010. She later joined the I Am the Change World Tour with Ndaba Mandela, Nelson Mandela's grandson and Jasmine Rand to discuss the power of international collective action.

In 2014, she formed a strategic alliance with civil rights attorneys Benjamin Crump and Jasmine Rand to forward social justice movements and causes including Trayvon Martin, Michael Brown, Tamir Rice and Mario Deane.

=== Film work ===
Her on screen acting credits includes Savannah, which she also wrote and executive produced TVJ, The Story of God with Academy Award winner Morgan Freeman, Disney Plus Rasta, A Soul's Journey City TV, OMI Jury Prize SXSW, Canadian Screen Award-winning films Akilla's Escape Netflix and Black Bodies Bell Media which also won much acclaim at Sundance.

Her screenwriter's credits are also growing with projects like Jamaican TV movie Savannah (2017), Earthworm (2016), Awaking Sankofa (2018), shot Cape Coast dungeons, Ghana and was story co-creator and associate producer on When Morning Comes (2022). As a director, recent work includes directing the music video for her mother's Sharon Marley single, "Steppah".

== Philanthropy and activism ==
In 2014, she become involved in a campaign to protect the site of Jamaica's first Rastafarian community, a Rastafarian place of worship - near the village established by Leonard P Howell in the 1930s.

In 2018, Prendergast became an advocate for police reform after she was reported to be breaking into a southern California AirBnb she had rented while on a work trip. She was with two other Black colleagues and a white assistant when they were surrounded by seven police cars.

In 2019 she made headlines, after she publicly commented that she was thinking of entering political office in Jamaica.

In 2021, Prendergast created an organization and campaign to support finalist Syesha Mercado in fighting the Manatee County Sheriff's department after they took away her newborn baby daughter.

Prendergast started non-profit organization the Humanity Ova Vanity, an organization and studio supported by the Rita Marley foundation that seeks to deliver social interventions through educational, art, film and community development initiatives.
