= B Is for Bob =

Children's music remix album by Bob Marley & The Wailers

Compilation album by Bob Marley & The Wailers
- Released: 23 June 2009
- Recorded: 2009
- Genre: Roots reggae
- Length: 51:06
- Label: Tuff Gong / UMG Family
- Producer: Bob Marley

Bob Marley & The Wailers chronology
Roots, Rock, Remixed (2007)	B Is for Bob (2009)	Live Forever (2011)

B is for Bob is a children's music remix album by reggae band Bob Marley & The Wailers, released on 23 June 2009 and is a posthumous album released after Marley's death. The album is a collection of old songs from their previous albums Legend, Rastaman Vibration, and Burnin'.

== Track listing ==
1. "Three Little Birds" (B Is Version) – 3:21
2. "Redemption Song" (B Is Mix) – 3:47
3. "Wake Up and Live, Pt. 1" – 4:26
4. "Bend Down Low" (B Is Version) – 3:34
5. "Lively Up Yourself" – 5:11
6. "Jamming" (B Is Version) – 4:26
7. "Small Axe" (B Is Version) – 4:23
8. "One Love / People Get Ready" – 2:53
9. "Satisfy My Soul" (B Is Mix) – 4:31
10. "Could You Be Loved" – 3:57
11. "Stir It Up" (B Is Version) – 2:54
12. "High Tide or Low Tide" (B Is Mix) – 4:42
