= Awake (Julian Marley album) =

Studio album by Julian Marley
- Released: 28 April 2009
- Genre: Reggae
- Label: Universal Records/Tuff Gong
- Producer: Stephen Marley, Julian Marley, Paul Fakhourie & Luke Andrews

Julian Marley chronology
A Time & Place (2003)	Awake (2009)

Professional ratings
Review scores
Source	Rating
Allmusic	3.5/5 stars
Music Emissions	4/5 stars
Robert Christgau	(B)

Awake is the third album by Julian Marley, released in 2009 on Tuff Gong. Awake was chosen as "best album of the year" in the International Reggae and World Music Awards in New York. It was nominated for "best reggae album" in the Grammy Awards.

== Track listing ==
All songs written by Julian Marley

1. Awake - 4:41
2. Boom Draw - 5:40
3. On the Floor - 4:25
4. Rosehall - 4:00
5. A Little Too Late (featuring Stephen Marley) - 5:00
6. Just in Time - 3:45
7. Jah Works - 3:19
8. Oh Girl (featuring Mr. Cheeks) - 3:42
9. Violence in the Streets (featuring Damian "Jr. Gong" Marley) - 5:01
10. All I Know - 3:51
11. Stay with Me - 4:24
12. Sharp as a Razor - 4:05
13. Things Ain't Cool - 3:54
14. Trying - 4:11
