= Greatest Hits (Joe Cocker album) =

Greatest hits album by Joe Cocker
- Released: November 1998
- Genre: Rock
- Label: EMI

Joe Cocker chronology
Across from Midnight (1997)	Greatest Hits (1998)	The Anthology (1999)

Greatest Hits is a European greatest hits album by British rock musician Joe Cocker, released in November 1998. The album includes two previously unreleased tracks, including a live recording with Eros Ramazzotti. A vinyl edition of the album was released 17 years later in 2015.

== Track listing ==
1. "Summer in the City" (John Sebastian, Mark Sebastian, Steve Boone) – 3:48
2. "Could You Be Loved" (Bob Marley) – 4:12
3. "The Simple Things" (Rick Neigher, Phil Roy, John Shanks) – 4:46
4. "N'Oubliez Jamais" (Jim Cregan, Russ Kunkel) – 4:40
5. "Have a Little Faith in Me" (John Hiatt) – 4:15
6. "What Becomes of the Brokenhearted" (William Weatherspoon, Paul Riser, James Dean) – 4:10
7. "Don't Let Me Be Misunderstood" (Bennie Benjamin, Gloria Caldwell, Sol Marcus) – 3:53
8. "Delta Lady" (Leon Russell) – 3:17
9. "You Are So Beautiful" (Billy Preston, Bruce Fisher) – 2:44
10. "That's All I Need to Know (live)" (feat. Eros Ramazzotti) – 4:00
11. "Let the Healing Begin" (Tony Joe White) – 4:15
12. "Tonight" (Gregg Sutton, Max Carl) – 4:45
13. "Night Calls" (Jeff Lynne) – 3:26
14. "Don't You Love Me Anymore (edited)" (Albert Hammond, Diane Warren) – 5:08
15. "When the Night Comes" (Bryan Adams, Jim Vallance, Warren) – 4:44
16. "You Can Leave Your Hat On" (Randy Newman) – 4:12
17. "Unchain My Heart" (Teddy Powell, Robert Sharp Jr.) – 5:03
18. "With a Little Help from My Friends (live, edited)" (John Lennon, Paul McCartney) – 5:56
- Tracks 1, 3, 5, 11 taken from Have a Little Faith, Sony BMG Music, released September 1994
- Tracks 2, 4, 12 taken from Across from Midnight, CMC International / Sanctuary, released April 1998.
- Tracks 6 original to this compilation.
- Tracks 7, 8, 9 taken from Organic, Sony BMG Music, released October 1996.
- Track 10 taken from Eros Live (Eros Ramazzotti album), DDD 74321 623782, released 1998.
- Track 13 taken from Night Calls, Capitol Records, released October 1991.
- Track 14, 16 taken from Cocker, Capitol Records, released March 1986.
- Track 15 taken from One Night of Sin, Capitol Records, released August 1989.
- Track 17 taken from Unchain My Heart, Capitol Records CLT 48285, released October 1987.
- Track 18 taken from Joe Cocker Live In Dortmund VHS, Picture Music International, released 1992.

== Charts ==
=== Weekly charts ===
Chart (1998)	Peak position
Dutch Albums (Album Top 100)	24
French Compilations (SNEP)	8
German Albums (Offizielle Top 100)	10
Norwegian Albums (VG-lista)	8
Swiss Albums (Schweizer Hitparade)	10

Chart (1999)	Peak position
Austrian Albums (Ö3 Austria)	5
Belgian Albums (Ultratop Flanders)	1
Belgian Albums (Ultratop Wallonia)	9
Portuguese Albums (AFP)	8
UK Albums (OCC)	24

Chart (2002)	Peak position
Finnish Albums (Suomen virallinen lista)	35

Chart (2015–2016)	Peak position
Polish Albums (ZPAV)	25
Swiss Albums (Schweizer Hitparade)	39
French Albums (SNEP)	101

=== Year-end charts ===
Chart (1998)	Position
Belgian Albums (Ultratop Flanders)	9
Belgian Albums (Ultratop Wallonia)	48

Chart (1999)	Position
Belgian Albums (Ultratop Flanders)	22
Belgian Albums (Ultratop Wallonia)	40
German Albums (Offizielle Top 100)	94

== Certifications ==
Region	Certification	Certified units/sales
Austria (IFPI Austria)	Gold	25,000^{*}
Belgium (BRMA)	2× Platinum	100,000^{*}
France (SNEP)	2× Gold	200,000^{*}
Germany (BVMI)	Gold	250,000^{^}
Netherlands (NVPI)	Gold	50,000^{^}
Poland (ZPAV)	Gold	10,000^{‡}
Switzerland (IFPI Switzerland)	Platinum	50,000^{^}
United Kingdom (BPI)	Gold	100,000^{‡}
Summaries
Europe (IFPI)	Platinum	1,000,000^{*}
^{*} Sales figures based on certification alone.^{^} Shipments figures based on certification alone.^{‡} Sales+streaming figures based on certification alone.
