= Conscious Party =

Studio album by Ziggy Marley and the Melody Makers
- Released: April 5, 1988
- Studio: Sigma Sound, New York City
- Genre: Reggae
- Length: 46:22
- Label: Virgin
- Producer: Chris Frantz and Tina Weymouth

Ziggy Marley and the Melody Makers chronology
| The Time Has Come: The Best of Ziggy Marley & the Melody Makers (1988) | Conscious Party (1988) | One Bright Day (1989) |

Singles from Conscious Party
- 1. "Tomorrow People" Released: 1988; 2. "Tumblin' Down" Released: 1988; 3. "Lee & Molly" Released: 1988

Professional ratings
Review scores
| Source | Rating |
|---|---|
| AllMusic | 4.5/5 stars |
| Rolling Stone | 4/5 stars |

Conscious Party is Ziggy Marley and the Melody Makers' third album. It was released in 1988. This album became popular with the hits "Tumblin' Down" and "Tomorrow People". It won the Grammy Award for Best Reggae Album in 1989.

The album saw the Melody Makers, the children of Bob Marley and Rita Marley - Ziggy, Stephen, Sharon and Cedella - who had been organised into a child band by their parents a decade earlier, step into global spotlight for their own talent - at the time public focus largely drawn towards band leader, lead vocalist and the album's chief composer Ziggy Marley.

== Track listing ==
All tracks are written by Ziggy Marley, except where noted.

| No. | Title | Writer(s) | Length |
|---|---|---|---|
| 1. | "Conscious Party" | | 4:54 |
| 2. | "Lee and Molly" | | 4:27 |
| 3. | "Tomorrow People" | | 3:38 |
| 4. | "New Love" | | 3:41 |
| 5. | "Tumblin' Down" | Tyrone Downie; Ziggy Marley | 4:01 |
| 6. | "We a Guh Some Weh" | | 3:51 |
| 7. | "A Who a Say" | Z. Marley; Steve Marley | 3:33 |
| 8. | "Have You Ever Been to Hell" | | 5:22 |
| 9. | "We Propose" | | 4:34 |
| 10. | "What's True" | | 3:27 |
| 11. | "Dreams of Home" | | 4:54 |

== Personnel ==
- Rita Marley - background vocals
- Jerry Harrison - Hammond organ
- Cedella Marley - background vocals
- Chris Frantz - producer
- Mulu Gessesse - guitar
- Zeleke Gessesse - bass
- Ziggy Marley - guitar, vocals, background vocals
- Stephen Marley - vocals, background vocals
- Dereje Makonnen - keyboards, composer
- Sharon Marley Pendergast - background vocals
- Lenny Pickett - clarinet, piccolo, saxophone, contrabass
- Gary Pozner - keyboards
- Melaku Retta - keyboards
- Keith Richards - lead guitar on "Lee and Molly"
- Chris Romanelli
- Glenn Rosenstein - engineer
- Mark Roule - tambourine
- Asrat Aemro Selassie - percussion, bongos, conga, tambourine, background vocals, vibraslap, cabassa, wood block
- Earl "Chinna" Smith - guitar
- Raphael W'Mariam - drums, timbales
- Franklyn "Bubbler" Waul - keyboards
- Laura Weymouth - background vocals
- Tina Weymouth - background vocals, producer

== Charts ==
=== Weekly charts ===
| Chart (1988–89) | Peak position |
|---|---|
| Australian Albums (ARIA) | 34 |
| Dutch Albums (Album Top 100) | 18 |
| New Zealand Albums (RMNZ) | 4 |
| Swedish Albums (Sverigetopplistan) | 16 |
| US Billboard 200 | 23 |
| US Top R&B/Hip-Hop Albums (Billboard) | 26 |

=== Year-end charts ===
| Chart (1988) | Position |
|---|---|
| US Billboard 200 | 52 |

=== Singles ===
| Year | Single | Chart | Position |
|---|---|---|---|
| 1988 | "Tomorrow People" | Australia (ARIA Charts) | 36 |
| 1988 | "Tomorrow People" | Italy Airplay (Music & Media) | 4 |
| 1988 | "Tomorrow People" | US Billboard Hot 100 | 39 |
| 1988 | "Tomorrow People" | US Hot Mainstream Rock Tracks | 16 |
| 1988 | "Tumblin' Down" | Modern Rock Tracks | 5 |
| 1988 | "Tumblin' Down" | Mainstream Rock Tracks | 43 |
| 1988 | "Tumblin' Down" | Hot R&B Singles & Tracks | 1 |
| 1988 | "Tumblin' Down" | Hot Dance Music/Club Play | 28 |
| 1988 | "Tumblin' Down" | Hot Dance Music/Maxi-Singles Sales | 1 |

== Certifications ==
| Region | Certification | Certified units/sales |
|---|---|---|
| Canada (Music Canada) | Gold | 50,000^{^} |
| United States (RIAA) | Platinum | 1,000,000^{^} |
^{^} Shipments figures based on certification alone.
