= Cedella Marley =

Jamaican singer (born 1967)

- Born: 23 August 1967 (age 59); Kingston, Jamaica
- Genre: Reggae
- Occupation: Singer
- Labels: Tuff Gong, Ghetto Youths

Cedella Marley Minto (born 23 August 1967) is a Jamaican singer. She is the daughter of reggae singers Bob Marley and Rita Marley and the mother of Skip Marley. She was in the group Ziggy Marley and the Melody Makers, along with her siblings. With the group, she has won three Grammy Awards.

== Career ==
=== 1980–1999: Early life and The Melody Makers ===
Formed at the request of their father, Bob Marley, only after his death did the Melody Makers come into their own. The band comprises four of Bob Marley's 11 children: vocalist/guitarist Ziggy, vocalist/guitarist/drummer Stephen, vocalist Cedella, and vocalist Sharon. Cedella's young brother Ziggy was the group's leader, with Stephen often sharing in the songwriting and lead vocals.

The group released more than ten albums, including their Grammy-winning albums Conscious Party, One Bright Day and Fallen Is Babylon. They have scored a number-one hit "Tumblin' Down", with other successful singles being "Tomorrow People", "Everyone Wants to Be", "Look Who's Dancin'", and "Power to Move Ya".

In the late 1980s and early 1990s, Cedella Marley appeared in a few movies, including The Mighty Quinn (1989) starring Denzel Washington, and was the female lead in Joey Breaker (1993) opposite Richard Edson.

=== 2002–present: Disbandment of the Melody Makers and recent work ===
In 2002, the group officially disbanded. Cedella is now the CEO of her father's recording label, Tuff Gong International. She also helps run her family's charitable organization, 1Love. In June 2010, Cedella released a song called "Can You Feel The Love Tonight", which was featured on the compilation album The Disney Reggae Club.

Cedella has begun several clothing lines, which are, "Catch a Fire", "High Tide", "Nice Time Deconstructed", and "Nice Time Kids". In February 2011, it was announced that she would design the uniform for the Jamaican track and field team at the 2012 Olympics, including world champion Usain Bolt, under an arrangement with Puma. She described her vision for the outfits as "Grace Jones meets my Dad – very music-inspired and a bit retro."

In September 2011, she released her book One Love. Cedella is also featured in the documentary movie, Marley, which was released in April 2012. Cedella Marley is also currently recording an album to be released in 2012 or 2013.

Her musical Bob Marley's Three Little Birds, which includes several of her father's songs, opened at the New Victory Theater in New York City in February 2014.

In June 2014, Marley presented a line of menswear she designed inspired both by clothes her father wore on the football pitch as well as the 2014 World Cup team designs. It consisted mainly of sportswear items such as T-shirts, hoodies, and tracksuit jackets. The line was named, simply, Marley. The proceeds from the line will go toward funding Jamaica women's national football team, the Reggae Girlz, of which Marley is currently a sponsor and official ambassador.

== Philanthropy ==
Marley is the acting director of the Bob Marley Foundation, which seeks to deliver social interventions throughout Jamaica through educational and community development initiatives.

In 2014, after learning the Jamaica women's national football team had disbanded because it was not receiving funding from the nation's football federation, Marley became a team benefactor. Through the Bob Marley Foundation, Cedella raised enough money for the team to reform and found the team's coach, Hue Menzies. She has continued to help fund the team through their surprise qualification for the 2019 FIFA Women's World Cup.

== Discography ==
Singles

- 2017: "Could You Be Loved"
- 2017: "Could You Be Loved" (featuring Savi & Bankay)

== Books ==
- 2002: 56 Thoughts from 56 Hope Road: The Sayings & Psalms of Bob Marley
- 2006: Three Little Birds
- 2008: The Boy from Nine Miles: The Early Life of Bob Marley (Young Spirit Books)
- 2011: One Love
- 2012: Every Little Thing: Based on the song 'Three Little Birds' by Bob Marley
- 2017: Cooking With Herb with Raquel Pelzel
