= Tumblin' Down (Ziggy Marley song) =

Song

"Tumblin' Down" is a 1988 single by Ziggy Marley and the Melody Makers. The single was the most successful of three entries on the Hot Black singles chart where it peaked at number one for two weeks. Although the single did not place on the Hot 100, it peaked at number twenty-eight on the dance charts.
