= The Anthology (Joe Cocker album) =

Compilation album by Joe Cocker
- Released: 17 August 1999
- Recorded: 1964–1982
- Genre: Rock
- Length: 152:40
- Label: A&M

Joe Cocker chronology
Greatest Hits (1998)	The Anthology (1999)	No Ordinary World (1999)

Professional ratings
Review scores
Source	Rating
AllMusic	4.5/5 stars

The Anthology is a compilation album by English singer Joe Cocker, covering his career between 1964 and 1982. It was released in 1999 (see 1999 in music).

== Track listing ==
=== Disc 1 ===
1. "I'll Cry Instead" – 1:43
2. "Marjorine" – 2:41
3. "Bye Bye Blackbird" – 3:30
4. "Just Like a Woman" – 5:20
5. "Feelin' Alright" – 4:11
6. "Do I Still Figure in Your Life" – 4:01
7. "Don't Let Me Be Misunderstood" – 4:43
8. "With a Little Help from My Friends" – 5:13
9. "Delta Lady" – 2:52
10. "She Came In Through the Bathroom Window" – 2:40
11. "Hitchcock Railway" – 4:40
12. "Something" – 3:35
13. "Dear Landlord" – 3:25
14. "Darling Be Home Soon" – 4:43
15. "The Letter" – 4:10
16. "Space Captain (live)" – 4:11
17. "Honky Tonk Women" (live) – 4:30
18. "Cry Me a River" (live) – 3:57
19. "Let's Go Get Stoned" (live) – 7:34
- Track 1-1 taken from "I'll Cry Instead" single, Decca F11974, released September 1964.
- Tracks 1-2, 1-3, 1-4, 1-5, 1-6, 1-7, 1-8 taken from With A Little Help From My Friends, A&M Records SP-3106, released May 1969.
- Tracks 1-9, 1-10, 1-11, 1-12, 1-13, 1-14 taken from Joe Cocker!, A&M Records SP-4224, released November 1969
- Tracks 1-15, 1-16 taken from "The Letter" single, Regal Zonophone RZ 3027, released June 1970
- Tracks 1-17, 1-18, 1-19 taken from Mad Dogs & Englishmen, A&M Records SP-6002, released September 1970

=== Disc 2 ===
1. "Pardon Me Sir" – 3:19
2. "High Time We Went" – 4:30
3. "Black-Eyed Blues" – 4:38
4. "Something to Say" – 5:25
5. "Put Out the Light" – 4:13
6. "I Can Stand a Little Rain" – 3:33
7. "You Are So Beautiful" – 2:45
8. "I Think It's Going to Rain Today" – 4:01
9. "Jamaica Say You Will" – 4:17
10. "The Jealous Kind" – 3:50
11. "Catfish" – 5:24
12. "A Song for You" – 6:27
13. "Fun Time" – 2:40
14. "I'm So Glad I'm Standing Here Today" (featuring The Crusaders) – 5:06
15. "Sweet Little Woman" – 4:02
16. "Many Rivers to Cross" – 3:45
17. "Talking Back to the Night" – 4:49
18. "Up Where We Belong" (featuring Jennifer Warnes) – 3:52
- Tracks 2-1, 2-2, 2-3, 2-4 taken from Joe Cocker (a.k.a. Something to Say), A&M Records SP-4368, released November 1972.
- Tracks 2-5, 2-6, 2-7 taken from I Can Stand a Little Rain, A&M Records SP-3175, released August 1974.
- Tracks 2-8, 2-9 taken from Jamaica Say You Will, A&M Records SP-4529, released August 1975.
- Tracks 2-10, 2-11, 2-12 taken from Stingray, A&M Records SP-4574, released May 1976.
- Track 2-13 taken from Luxury You Can Afford, Elekta/Asylum Records 6e-145, released September 1978.
- Track 2-14 taken from Standing Tall, MCA Records MCA-5254, released October 1981.
- Tracks 2-15, 2-16, 2-17 taken from Sheffield Steel, Island Records IL 9750, released July 1982.
- Track 2-18 taken from An Officer and a Gentleman soundtrack, Island Records 90017, released November 1982.

== Charts ==
Chart (2014)	Peak position
Australian Albums (ARIA)	82
