= A Time & Place =

Studio album by Julian Marley
- Released: 2003
- Genre: Reggae
- Length: 59:38
- Label: Lightyear Entertainment

Julian Marley chronology
Lion in the Morning (1996)	A Time & Place (2003)	Awake (2009)

A Time & Place is the second studio album by reggae artist Julian Marley, released in 2003 on Lightyear Entertainment.

== Tracks ==
1. Father's Place (4:03)
2. Where She Lay (5:53)
3. Harder Dayz (4:22)
4. Build Together (4:02)
5. Summer Daisies (5:53)
6. One Way Train (4:28)
7. Systems (3:44)
8. I'll Never (5:00)
9. Sitting in the Dark (4:35)
10. Rock With Me (4:28)
11. Sunshine (4:10)
12. Couldn't Be The Place (3:53)
13. Time (5:02)
