= Across from Midnight =

Studio album by Joe Cocker
- Released: 29 August 1997
- Studio: Sarm Workshop and Westside Studios (London, UK); NRG Studios (North Hollywood, California); Image Recording Studios (Los Angeles, California)
- Genre: Rock
- Length: 54:30
- Label: CMC International
- Producer: Roger Davies; Chris Lord-Alge; Peter Smith; Bob Thiele

Joe Cocker chronology
Organic (1996)	Across from Midnight (1997)	Greatest Hits (1998)

Professional ratings
Review scores
Source	Rating
AllMusic	2.5/5 stars
Uncut	3/5 stars

Across from Midnight is the sixteenth studio album by English singer Joe Cocker, released in 1997.

== Track listing ==
1. "Tonight" – 4:49 (Max Carl, Greg Sutton)
2. "Could You Be Loved" – 5:47 (Bob Marley)
3. "That's All I Need to Know" – 4:05 (Graham Lyle, Eros Ramazzotti, Vladi Tosetto)
4. "N'Oubliez Jamais" – 4:43 (Jim Cregan, Russ Kunkel)
5. "What Do I Tell My Heart?" – 5:00 (Rick Neigher, John Shanks)
6. "Wayward Soul" – 4:16 (Brenda Russell, Mark Cawley)
7. "Loving You Tonight" – 4:38 (Christopher Difford, Glenn Tilbrook)
8. "Across from Midnight" – 4:57 (Leann White, Tony Joe White)
9. "What Do You Say?" – 4:42 (Dean Grakal, Greg Sutton)
10. "The Last One to Know" – 3:30 (Bob Thiele, Greg Sutton)
11. "That's the Way Her Love Is" – 2:44 (Stephen Allen Davis)
12. "Need Your Love So Bad" – 5:19 (Mertis John Jr.)

== Personnel ==
- Joe Cocker – lead vocals
- Chris Stainton – acoustic piano (1, 2, 5, 8, 11, 12), Rhodes electric piano (1, 3, 6–9), Hammond B3 organ (3, 4, 6, 7, 9)
- C.J. Vanston – synthesizers (1, 5, 8, 11), Rhodes electric piano (1, 4, 8), Hammond B3 organ (2, 11), string arrangements (2), acoustic piano (4), accordion (4), synth strings (11)
- Steve Pigott – additional keyboards (3, 6, 7), keyboards (9)
- Garry Hughes – synthesizers (7), synth strings (7), keyboards (9, 10)
- Michael Landau – guitars (1, 2, 4, 5, 8)
- Dean Parks – guitars (1, 8), wah wah guitar (2), acoustic guitar (4), acoustic 12-string guitar (5), electric 12-string guitar (5)
- Tim Pierce – guitars (1, 4, 5)
- Graham Lyle – acoustic guitar (3)
- Tim Renwick – guitars (3, 6, 12)
- Ronnie Johnson – guitars (7, 9)
- Glenn Tilbrook – guitars (7), backing vocals (7)
- Matt Backer – guitars (10)
- Nigel Spennewyn – guitars (10)
- Neil Stubenhaus – bass guitar (1, 5, 8)
- James "Hutch" Hutchinson – bass guitar (2, 4)
- Phil Spalding – bass guitar (3, 6, 7, 9, 10, 12), backing vocals (3, 6, 7, 9)
- John Robinson – drums (1, 5, 8)
- Kenny Aronoff – drums (2, 4)
- Geoff Dunn – drums (3, 6, 7, 9, 12)
- Rafael Padilla – percussion (1, 4, 5, 8)
- Luis Conte – percussion (2)
- Miles Bould – percussion (7, 9)
- Dick Marx – horn arrangements (2)
- Dan Higgins – saxophones (2)
- Jamie Talbot – alto saxophone (7, 9)
- Bill Reichenbach Jr. – trombone (2)
- Neil Sidwell – trombone (7)
- Gary Grant – trumpet (2)
- Jerry Hey – trumpet (2)
- Steve Sidwell – trumpet (7)
- Mark Feltham – harmonica (10)
- Nick Ingman – string arrangements (3)
- Joey Diggs – backing vocals (1, 5)
- Lamont Van Hook – backing vocals (1, 5)
- Fred White – backing vocals (1, 5)
- Alexandra Brown – backing vocals (2, 4, 8)
- Mortonette Jenkins – backing vocals (2, 4, 8)
- Marlena Jeter – backing vocals (2, 4, 8)
- Pete Smith – backing vocals (3, 6, 7, 9)
- Claudia Fontaine – backing vocals (6)
- Chris Difford – backing vocals (7)
- Tessa Niles – backing vocals (7)
- Juliet Roberts – backing vocals (10)

== Production ==
- Joe Cocker – executive producer
- Roger Davies – producer (1, 2, 4, 5, 8, 11), executive producer (3, 6, 7, 9, 10, 12), management
- Chris Lord-Alge – producer (1, 2, 4, 5, 8, 11)
- C. J. Vanston – producer (2)
- Pete Smith – producer (3, 6, 7, 9, 12)
- Garry Hughes – producer (10)
- Bob Thiele – original production (10)
- Norman Moore – art direction, design
- Greg Gorman – photography
- Michael Owens – tray photography

Technical credits

- Tony Cousins – mastering at Metropolis Mastering (London, UK)
- Doug Sax – mastering at The Mastering Lab (Hollywood, California, USA)
- Chris Lord-Alge – recording (1, 2, 4, 5, 8, 11), overdub recording (1, 2, 4, 5, 8, 11), mixing (1, 2, 4, 5, 8, 11)
- Matt Howe – recording (3, 6, 7, 9, 12), mixing (3, 6, 7, 9, 12)
- Andy Baker – recording (10)
- Dave Burnham – recording (10)
- Pete Smith – mixing (10)
- A. Mixdorf – recording assistant (1, 2, 4, 5, 8, 11)
- Mike Dy – overdub assistant (1, 2, 4, 5, 8, 11)
- Martin Dutasta – recording assistant (3, 6, 7, 9, 12)
- Lee Phillips – mix assistant (3, 6, 7, 9, 12)

== Charts ==
=== Weekly charts ===
Chart (1997)	Peak position
Australian Albums (ARIA Charts)	90
Austrian Albums (Ö3 Austria)	3
Belgian Albums (Ultratop Flanders)	3
Belgian Albums (Ultratop Wallonia)	2
Dutch Albums (Album Top 100)	2
French Albums (SNEP)	5
German Albums (Offizielle Top 100)	3
Hungarian Albums (MAHASZ)	35
New Zealand Albums (RMNZ)	27
Norwegian Albums (VG-lista)	7
Swedish Albums (Sverigetopplistan)	37
Swiss Albums (Schweizer Hitparade)	4
UK Albums (OCC)	94

=== Year-end charts ===
Chart (1997)	Position
Austrian Albums (Ö3 Austria)	36
Belgian Albums (Ultratop Flanders)	10
Belgian Albums (Ultratop Wallonia)	18
Dutch Albums (Album Top 100)	77
French Albums (SNEP)	33
German Albums (Offizielle Top 100)	27
Swiss Albums (Schweizer Hitparade)	28
Chart (1998)	Position
Belgian Albums (Ultratop Wallonia)	96
German Albums (Offizielle Top 100)	49

== Certifications ==
Region	Certification	Certified units/sales
Austria (IFPI Austria)	Gold	25,000^{*}
Belgium (BRMA)	Platinum	50,000^{*}
France (SNEP)	Platinum	300,000^{*}
Germany (BVMI)	Platinum	500,000^{^}
Netherlands (NVPI)	Platinum	100,000^{^}
Norway (IFPI Norway)	Gold	25,000^{*}
Switzerland (IFPI Switzerland)	Platinum	50,000^{^}
Summaries
Europe (IFPI)	Platinum	1,000,000^{*}
^{*} Sales figures based on certification alone.^{^} Shipments figures based on certification alone.
