= Bob Marley Museum =

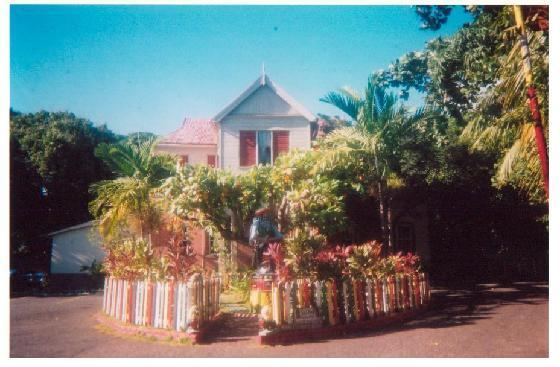
- Front of house

- Location within Jamaica
- Established: 11 May 1986
- Location: 56 Hope Road, Kingston, Jamaica
- Coordinates: 18°01′11″N 76°46′47″W
- Type: Historic house and music museum
- Website: www.bobmarleymuseum.com

The Bob Marley Museum is a tourist attraction in Kingston, Jamaica, dedicated to the reggae musician Bob Marley. The museum is located at 56 Hope Road, Kingston, and is Bob Marley's former place of residence. It was home to the Tuff Gong reggae record label which was founded by The Wailers in 1970. In 1976, it was the site of a failed assassination attempt on Bob Marley. It was converted into a museum in 1986 by his wife, Rita Marley after his death. From 1986 to 1988, Sharon Marley served as the curator of the museum.

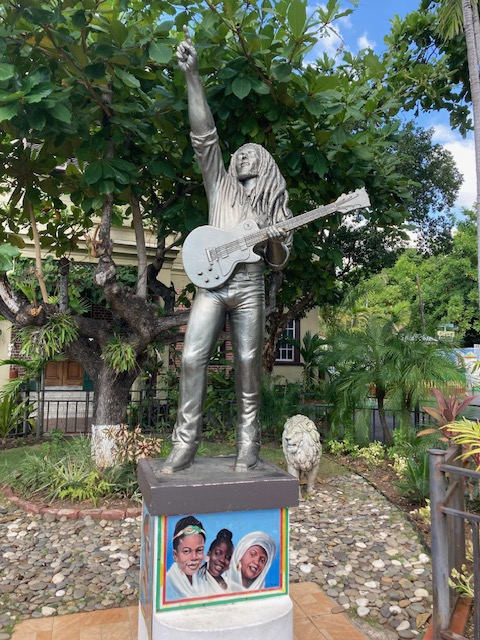
Statue of Bob Marley outside the museum

The song "56 Hope Road" from the album In the Pursuit of Leisure (2003) by Sugar Ray featuring Shaggy is named in reference to the home.

== See also ==
- List of music museums
