= Lion in the Morning =

Studio album by Julian Marley
- Released: 1996
- Genre: Reggae
- Length: 44:36
- Label: Lightyear Entertainment

Julian Marley chronology
Lion in the Morning (1996)	A Time & Place (2003)

Lion in the Morning is the debut album by British Jamaican reggae musician Julian Marley, released in 1996 on Lightyear Entertainment.

== Tracks ==
1. "Loving Clear" (3:54)
2. "Blossoming and Blooming" (4:13)
3. "Lion in the Morning" (3:57)
4. "Now You Know" (4:35)
5. "Babylon Cookie Jar" (4:23)
6. "Same Old Story" (3:49)
7. "Attack Back" (4:00)
8. "Arm Your Soul" (4:14)
9. "Ease These Pains" (3:31)
10. "When the Sun Comes Up" (3:52)
11. "Got to Be" (4:08)
