= The Time Has Come: The Best of Ziggy Marley & the Melody Makers =

Greatest hits album by Ziggy Marley and the Melody Makers
- Released: 1988
- Genre: Reggae
- Label: EMI; Tuff Gong

Ziggy Marley and the Melody Makers chronology
The Time Has Come: The Best of Ziggy Marley & the Melody Makers (1988)	The Best of (1988-1993) (1997)

The Time Has Come: The Best of Ziggy Marley & the Melody Makers is the first greatest hits release from Ziggy Marley and the Melody Makers.

AllMusic rated it three stars.

== Track listing ==
1. "Give a Little Love"
2. "Get Up Jah Jah Children"
3. "Freedom Road"
4. "Children Playing in the Streets"
5. "Lyin' in Bed"
6. "Aiding and Abetting"
7. "Say People"
8. "Natty Dread Rampage"
9. "Naah Leggo"
10. "Met Her on a Rainy Day"
11. "Reggae Revolution"
12. "Reggae Is Now"
