= The Best Of (1988–1993) =

Greatest hits album by Ziggy Marley and the Melody Makers
- Released: 1997
- Recorded: 1988–1993
- Genre: Reggae
- Length: 71:46
- Label: Virgin Records

Ziggy Marley and the Melody Makers chronology
The Time Has Come: The Best of Ziggy Marley & the Melody Makers (1988)	The Best Of (1988–1993) (1997)	The Best of Ziggy Marley & the Melody Makers (2008)

The Best Of (1988–1993) is the second greatest hits album by Ziggy Marley and the Melody Makers. It consists of seventeen songs.

== Tracks ==
1. Kozmik
2. Look Who's Dancing
3. One Bright Day
4. Goodtime
5. Joy and Blues
6. Justice
7. Black My Story (Not History)
8. Lee & Molly
9. New Love
10. Tomorrow People
11. Brothers and Sisters
12. Rainbow Country
13. Tumblin' Down
14. Small People
15. When the Lights Gone Out
16. Who Will Be There
17. Conscious Party
