= Ghetto Youths Crew =

Record label

Ghetto Youths Crew is a record label founded by the Marley Brothers to help underprivileged youths who fight the struggle to survive. It was created by Ziggy, Stephen, Julian and Damian Marley who are all sons of legendary reggae artist Bob Marley.

Ghetto Youths Foundation, Inc. is a non-profit foundation founded and directed by Stephen, Damian, and Julian Marley. The mission of the foundation is to provide resources and opportunity to communities in need across the globe. Ghetto Youths Foundation is active in many communities from Jamaica to Ethiopia, from India to Miami, and is dedicated to uplifting people from all walks of life.

Let the hungry be fed, the naked clothed, the sick nourished, the aged protected, and the infants cared for…
