= Live Vol. 1 (Ziggy Marley and the Melody Makers album) =

Live album by Ziggy Marley and the Melody Makers
- Released: 2000
- Genre: Reggae
- Label: Elektra

Live Vol. 1 is a live album by Ziggy Marley and the Melody Makers, released in 2000.

== Track listing ==
1. "Power To Move Ya"
2. "Conscious Party"
3. "Beautiful Day"
4. "Jah Bless" (Vincent Ford)
5. "One Good Spliff"
6. "Free Like We Want 2B"
7. "Jammin'" (Bob Marley)
8. "Postman"
9. "Stir It Up" (Bob Marley)
10. "Higher Vibration"
11. "People Get Ready" (Curtis Mayfield)
12. "Could You Be Loved" (Bob Marley)
13. "I Know You Don't Care About Me"
