= One Bright Day =

Studio album by Ziggy Marley and the Melody Makers
- Released: July 25, 1989
- Studio: Compass Point Studios, Nassau, Bahamas
- Genre: Reggae
- Length: 54:38
- Label: Virgin
- Producer: Chris Frantz, Glenn Rosenstein, Tina Weymouth, Ziggy Marley

Ziggy Marley and the Melody Makers chronology
Conscious Party (1988)	One Bright Day (1989)	Jahmekya (1991)

Singles from One Bright Day
- 1. "Look Who's Dancing" Released: 1989; 2. "One Bright Day" Released: 1989

Professional ratings
Review scores
Source	Rating
AllMusic	3/5 stars

One Bright Day is the fourth album by Ziggy Marley and the Melody Makers, released in 1989. It won the Grammy Award for Best Reggae Album in 1990.

== Track listing ==
No.	Title	Writer(s)	Length
1.	"Black My Story (Not History)"	Ziggy Marley; Stephen Marley	4:16
2.	"One Bright Day"	Ziggy Marley	4:12
3.	"Who Will Be There"	Ziggy Marley; Stephen Marley	4:10
4.	"When the Lights Gone Out"	Ziggy Marley	4:09
5.	"All Love"	Ziggy Marley	4:39
6.	"Look Who's Dancing"	Ziggy Marley; Stephen Marley	5:00
7.	"Justice"	Ziggy Marley	4:12
8.	"Love Is the Only Law"	Ziggy Marley; Cedella Marley	4:07
9.	"Pains of Life"	Ziggy Marley	3:46
10.	"Urb-an Music"	Ziggy Marley	2:54
11.	"Problems"	Ziggy Marley; Sharon Marley Pendergast	4:02
12.	"All You Got"	Ziggy Marley; Stephen Marley	4:19
13.	"When the Lights Gone Out (Jamaican Stylee)""	Ziggy Marley	4:52
Total length:			54:38

== Charts ==
Chart (1989)	Peak position
US Billboard 200	26
US Top R&B/Hip-Hop Albums (Billboard)	43

== Certifications ==
Region	Certification	Certified units/sales
United States (RIAA)	Gold	500,000^{^}
^{^} Shipments figures based on certification alone.
