= Joy and Blues =

Studio album by Ziggy Marley and the Melody Makers
- Released: 1993
- Genre: Reggae
- Label: Virgin
- Producer: Ziggy Marley and the Melody Makers

Ziggy Marley and the Melody Makers chronology
Jahmekya (1991)	Joy and Blues (1993)	Free Like We Want 2 B (1995)

Singles from Joy and Blues
- 1. "Brothers and Sisters" Released: 1993

Joy and Blues is a studio album by the reggae band Ziggy Marley and the Melody Makers, released in 1993 on Virgin Records. The first single was "Brothers and Sisters", which was promoted to modern rock radio.

The album was nominated for a Grammy Award, in the "Best Reggae Album" category. It peaked at No. 178 on the Billboard 200.

== Production ==
"There She Goes" is a version of Bob Marley's "Stand Alone". "African Herbsman" is a cover of the Richie Havens song, which Bob had covered in the early 1970s.

== Critical reception ==
Professional ratings
Review scores
Source	Rating
AllMusic	4.5/5 stars
Calgary Herald	B
Rolling Stone	3/5 stars

Trouser Press stated: "Whether it's the familiarity of the sound, the concentration of energy or the band's congenital fluency in their father's tongue, the album is a solid winner." The Calgary Herald wrote that Marley is "great at putting an uptempo, sunny sound on a song that's got a serious, even threatening undertow."

AllMusic noted that "the arrangements are more subtle than in the past, quietly enhancing the songs' atmospheres and lyrics."

== Track listing ==
1. "Joy and Blues"
2. "Brothers and Sisters"
3. "There She Goes"
4. "Talk"
5. "Rebel in Disguise"
6. "X Marks The Spot"
7. "Head Top"
8. "African Herbsman"
9. "World So Corrupt"
10. "Garden"
11. "Mama"
12. "This One"
