= Jahmekya =

Studio album by Ziggy Marley and the Melody Makers
- Released: 1991
- Genre: Reggae
- Label: Virgin
- Producer: Glenn Rosenstein, Ziggy Marley and the Melody Makers

Ziggy Marley and the Melody Makers chronology
One Bright Day (1989)	Jahmekya (1991)	Joy and Blues (1993)

Singles from Jahmekya
- 1. "Good Time" Released: 1991; 2. "Kozmik" Released: 1991

Professional ratings
Review scores
Source	Rating
AllMusic	4/5 stars
Chicago Tribune	3/4 stars
Robert Christgau	B+
The Encyclopedia of Popular Music	3/5 stars
Entertainment Weekly	B−
MusicHound Rock: The Essential Album Guide	3.5/5 stars
The Rolling Stone Album Guide	3.5/5 stars

Jahmekya is a studio album by the reggae group Ziggy Marley and the Melody Makers, released in 1991.

The album was nominated for a Grammy. It peaked at #63 on the Billboard 200.

== Production ==
The album was produced by Glenn Rosenstein and the band. It was notable for incorporating a more contemporary Jamaican production sound.

Stephen Marley took a more pronounced role on the album, contributing both lead vocals on two tracks as well as writing or cowriting almost a third of the songs.

== Critical reception ==
AllMusic wrote that "the album has a much tougher sound than previous records, and its digitized beats are indebted to Jamaica's dancehalls." The New York Times wrote that the band "have joined their contemporaries in a sonic universe where computers and synthesizers jostle percussion and guitars, where dancehall toasting (rapping) can turn up alongside singing, and where the grooves are stark, propulsive and full of unexpected jolts." Robert Christgau wrote that "the complex drive of the music, cut this time in full Tuff Gong regalia, could pass for innovative: a genuine reggae groove at pop speeds with pop horns."

== Track listing ==
1. "Raw Riddim"
2. "Kozmik"
3. "Rainbow Country"
4. "Drastic"
5. "Good Time"
6. "What Conquers Defeat"
7. "First Night"
8. "Wrong Right Wrong"
9. "Herbs an' Spices"
10. "Problem With My Woman"
11. "Jah Is True and Perfect"
12. "Small People"
13. "So Good, So Right"
14. "Namibia"
15. "New Time and Age"
16. "Generation"
