= Could You Be Loved =

1980 single by Bob Marley and the Wailers

Single by Bob Marley and the Wailers

from the album Uprising
- B-side: "One Drop"
- Released: 16 May 1980
- Genre: Reggae; disco
- Length: 3:56
- Label: Island
- Songwriter: Bob Marley
- Producers: Bob Marley; Chris Blackwell

Bob Marley and the Wailers singles chronology
| "Zimbabwe" (1979) | "Could You Be Loved" (1980) | "Three Little Birds" (1980) |

Music video
- "Could You Be Loved" on YouTube

"Could You Be Loved" is a song by Jamaican reggae band Bob Marley and the Wailers. It was released in 1980 as the first single from their twelfth and last album, Uprising and is also included on their greatest-hits album Legend (1984). The song was very successful on the charts in Europe, peaking within the top 10 in Belgium, France, Ireland, Italy, the Netherlands, Norway, Spain, Switzerland and the UK. Additionally, it was a top 20 hit in Sweden and West Germany.

== Composition ==
Written in 1979 on an aeroplane while The Wailers were experimenting on guitar, "Could You Be Loved" has been described as a reggae and disco fusion. In the middle of the song, background singers quote a verse from Bob Marley's first single "Judge Not": "The road of life is rocky; And you may stumble too. So while you point your fingers, someone else is judging you". Instruments used on the original record of this song are guitars, bass, drums, acoustic piano, the Hohner Clavinet and an organ, as well as the Brazilian cuíca.

== Impact and legacy ==
American magazine Rolling Stone included "Could You Be Loved" at number 363 in their list of "500 Best Songs of All Time" in 2021.

In 2025, King Charles III partnered with Apple Music to launch a radio show called The King's Music Room to mark Commonwealth Day with a selection of songs that "bring him joy" and "reflects the diversity of the Commonwealth". Could You Be Loved was the first track featured in the program. Additionally, a version of the song performed by the King's Guard band was used in the shows introduction and preceding promotional materials.

== Music video ==
On 25 July 2022, the official music video of the song was released on Marley's YouTube channel.

== Track listings ==
- 7" single
1. "Could You Be Loved" – 3:35
2. "One Drop" – 3:50
- 7" single
1. "Could You Be Loved" – 3:35
2. "No Woman, No Cry (Live '75)" – 3:57

== Charts ==
=== Weekly charts ===
| Chart (1980) | Peak position |
|---|---|
| Australia (Kent Music Report) | 95 |
| Belgium (Ultratop 50 Flanders) | 3 |
| France (IFOP) | 10 |
| Ireland (IRMA) | 3 |
| Italy (Musica e dischi) | 6 |
| Netherlands (Dutch Top 40) | 2 |
| Netherlands (Single Top 100) | 4 |
| New Zealand (Recorded Music NZ) | 2 |
| Norway (VG-lista) | 10 |
| Spain (AFYVE) | 6 |
| Sweden (Sverigetopplistan) | 11 |
| Switzerland (Schweizer Hitparade) | 2 |
| UK Singles (Official Charts) | 5 |
| US Hot Dance Club Play (Billboard) | 6 |
| US Hot Soul Singles (Billboard) | 56 |
| West Germany (GfK) | 13 |

| Year | Chart | Peak position |
|---|---|---|
| 1981 | New Zealand (Recorded Music NZ) | 33 |
| 1984 | UK Singles (Official Charts) | 71 |
| 1985 | New Zealand (Recorded Music NZ) | 16 |
| 1990 | Finland (Suomen virallinen lista) | 12 |
| 1991 | France (SNEP) | 46 |
| 1991 | Netherlands (Dutch Top 40) | 30 |
| 1991 | Netherlands (Single Top 100) | 27 |
| 2024 | Global 200 (Billboard) | 172 |
| 2026 | Netherlands Airplay (Radiomonitor) | 50 |

=== Year-end charts ===
| Chart (1980) | Position |
|---|---|
| Belgium (Ultratop 50 Flanders) | 38 |
| Netherlands (Dutch Top 40) | 23 |
| Netherlands (Single Top 100) | 50 |
| Switzerland (Schweizer Hitparade) | 18 |
| West Germany (Official German Charts) | 61 |

== Certifications ==
| Region | Certification | Certified units/sales |
|---|---|---|
| Brazil (Pro-Música Brasil) | Gold | 30,000^{‡} |
| Denmark (IFPI Danmark) | Platinum | 90,000^{‡} |
| Germany (BVMI) | Gold | 250,000^{‡} |
| Italy (FIMI) | Platinum | 50,000^{‡} |
| New Zealand (RMNZ) | 9× Platinum | 270,000^{‡} |
| Portugal (AFP) | Platinum | 10,000^{‡} |
| Spain (Promusicae) | Platinum | 60,000^{‡} |
| United Kingdom (BPI) Sales since 2005 | 3× Platinum | 1,800,000^{‡} |
^{‡} Sales+streaming figures based on certification alone.

== Joe Cocker version ==
"Could You Be Loved"

Single by Joe Cocker

from the album Across from Midnight
- Released: 7 July 1997
- Genre: Rock
- Length: 4:35
- Label: CMC International
- Songwriter: Bob Marley
- Producers: Chris Lord-Alge; Roger Davies; Jeffery CJ Vanston

Joe Cocker singles chronology
| "Into the Mystic" (1996) | "Could You Be Loved" (1997) | "N'oubliez jamais" (1997) |

British singer Joe Cocker covered "Could You Be Loved" on his 1997 album Across from Midnight. The single peaked at number one in Hungary.

=== Track listings ===
- CD single
1. "Could You Be Loved" (Single Version) – 4:35
2. "Could You Be Loved" (Radio Edit) – 4:18
3. "The Way Her Love Is" – 2:44

=== Charts ===
| Chart (1997) | Peak position |
|---|---|
| Austria (Ö3 Austria Top 40) | 39 |
| Germany (GfK) | 77 |
| Hungary (Mahasz) | 1 |
| Netherlands (Single Top 100) | 88 |
| Switzerland (Schweizer Hitparade) | 46 |
| UK Singles (Official Charts) | 86 |

== Cover versions ==
Marley's four eldest children Ziggy Marley and the Melody Makers have performed the song numerous times during their tours. Their performance versions appear on the concert DVDs "Ziggy Marley and the Melody Makers Live", "Marley Magic: Live in Central Park at Summerstage", "One Love: The Bob Marley All-Star Tribute", and their live album "Live Vol. 1".
