= Ziggy Marley and the Melody Makers =

Jamaican-American reggae family group

- Left to right: Sharon, Cedella, Stephen, and Ziggy

Background information
- Also known as: The Melody Makers
- Origin: Brooklyn, New York, U.S.
- Genres: Reggae, dancehall
- Years active: 1979–2002
- Labels: Tuff Gong, Rita Marley Music, Ghetto Youths United, EMI America, EMI, Virgin, Elektra, Rounder
- Past members: Ziggy Marley; Stephen Marley; Sharon Marley; Cedella Marley
- Website: MelodyMakers.com

Ziggy Marley and the Melody Makers were a Jamaican-American reggae family group whose line-up consisted of the children of musicians Bob Marley and Rita Marley, including lead singer Ziggy Marley with Sharon Marley, Cedella Marley, and Stephen Marley. Formed in 1979 in Brooklyn, New York, Ziggy Marley and the Melody Makers members began their musical endeavours in their pre-teens under the name the Melody Makers.

Ziggy Marley and the Melody Makers were launched into mainstream recognition following the release of their best-selling fourth album, Conscious Party, which contained the hit single "Tomorrow People" and the number-one single "Tumblin' Down".

Their fifth album, One Bright Day, which contains themes of optimism and self-empowerment, was released in 1989. In 2000, they toured worldwide for the release of their live DVD, Ziggy Marley and the Melody Makers Live (2001). In 1996, they sang the theme song for the animated children's TV series Arthur.

== Recording history ==
=== 1979–1983: Early beginnings and Children Playing in the Streets ===
Originally formed at the request of their father, Bob Marley, it was only after his death that the Melody Makers came into their own. Their vision, however, is similar to their father's desire to bring people together through music and the Melody Makers' pop-reggae sound has certainly done that. The band is comprised by four of Bob Marley's 11 children, vocalist/guitarist Ziggy, vocalist/guitarist/drummer Stephen, vocalist Cedella, and vocalist Sharon. As the eldest male, Ziggy is viewed by the press as the group's leader, with Stephen often sharing in the songwriting and lead vocals.

The four siblings initially came together as a musical unit in 1979 to record "Children Playing in the Streets". Bob Marley had composed the song four years earlier for his children and wanted to share this gift with children around the world. All royalties from the single were pledged to the United Nations, to aid its efforts during the International Year of the Child. Ziggy and Stephen performed together at their father's funeral on 21 May 1981, dancing alongside the I-Threes and the Wailers, during their brief homage to the musician. Later that year, the Melody Makers released their second single, "What a Plot," which, like their debut, appeared on their late father's own Tuff Gong label. In 1983, the group performed at Reggae Sunsplash, a festival that Ziggy and Stephen were already veterans of, having appeared on-stage there in 1979 during the Wailers' own set.

=== 1984–1987: Play the Game Right, name change and subsequent releases ===
In 1984, the Melody Makers began a recording session with English producer Steve Levine that released a single, "Lying in Bed". In 1985, the group released their first album, Play the Game Right. Although accompanied by the Barrett brothers, who were the solid rhythm section for the Wailers, the group's record bore little resemblance to their father's music.

In 1986, Hey World was released and credited to Ziggy Marley & the Melody Makers. This album marked a further development of the group's sound, combining pop, roots reggae, and electro-influenced production. It also reflected the group's increasingly distinct musical identity apart from that of their father, Bob Marley. In support of the album, Ziggy Marley & the Melody Makers embarked on their first tour, with Nadine Sutherland and the I-Threes as opening acts. The group was well received at the yearly Reggae Sunsplash in 1986 and 1987.

=== 1988–1990: Conscious Party, career breakthrough and subsequent releases ===
In 1988, the band's popularity was so high that they were signed to the international major label Virgin Records. Later that year, they went into the studio with Tina Weymouth and Chris Franz of Talking Heads to record their third album, Conscious Party. The album charted at no. 23 on the Billboard 200 and no. 26 on the R&B Albums chart. The album spawned the successful single "Tomorrow People", which charted at no. 16 on the Mainstream Rock chart and no. 39 on the Hot 100. The second single "Tumblin' Down" was also well-received charting at no. 1 on Hot Dance Music/Maxi-Singles Sales chart and at no. 28 on the Dance Music/Club Play Singles charts. The album received a Grammy Award for "Best Reggae Album".

The Melody Makers' follow-up album One Bright Day, released in 1989. The album charted at no. 26 on the Billboard 200 and at no. 43 on the R&B Albums chart. The single "Look Who's Dancin'" received positive feedback and charted at no. 41 on Hot Dance Music/Maxi-Singles Sales chart and at no. 23 on the Dance Music/Club Play Singles charts. The album also spawned the singles "Black My Story (Not History)", "One Bright Day", "Justice", and "When the Lights Gone Out". The album received a Grammy Award for "Best Reggae Album".

=== 1991–1992: Jahmekya ===
In 1991, the group released their sixth album, Jahmekya. Although it brought the Melody Makers their most glowing reviews, the record itself did not begin to equal the sales of their last albums, and their single, "Good Time", barely scraped into the bottom reaches of the charts. The single "Good Time" only charted no. 85 on Hot 100 charts. The album charted at no. 3 on the Top World Music Albums and at no. 63 on the Billboard 200. The album also spawned the singles "Rainbow Country", "Kozmic", and "Small People". The album received a Grammy nomination.

=== 1993–1997: Joy and Blues, Ghetto Youths United, leaving Virgin Records and subsequent releases ===
In 1993, the group released their seventh album Joy and Blues. The album charted at no. 5 on the Top World Music Albums chart, no. 75 on the R&B Albums chart, no. 178 on the Billboard 200 chart, and no. 11 on the Top Reggae Albums chart. Returning to their roots with a vengeance and accompanied by former Wailers' bassist Aston Barrett, the album was their final one for Virgin.

In 1995, the group signed a record deal with Elektra and released "Free Like We Want 2 B" accompanied by the group's own recording label "Ghetto Youths United". The album charted at no. 170 on the Billboard 200 chart and no. 3 on the Top Reggae Albums chart. The single "Power to Move Ya" charted no. 13 on the Dance Music/Club Play Singles.

In 1996, Ziggy Marley and the Melody Makers released a song called "Love Power" for the Jim Henson soundtrack movie Muppet Treasure Island with the composers Barry Mann, Cynthia Weil. In that same year, the group performed "Believe in Yourself", the theme song to the PBS Kids series, Arthur.

In early 1997, the group performed at the tribute concert "Marley Magic Live" in Central Park, New York on the Summerstage. They also released their second best-of album "The Best of (1988-1993)". Later that year, the group released ninth album "Fallen Is Babylon". The album only charted no. 3 on the Top Reggae Albums chart. In 1998, the second single "Everyone Wants to Be" charted at no. 16 on the Dance Music/Club Play Singles chart. The album earned the group their third Grammy Award.

=== 1999–2002: Spirit of Music and final releases ===
In 1999, the group released their tenth and final studio album, Spirit of Music. The album peaked at no. 1 on the Top Reggae Albums chart. The album spawned the singles "Higher Vibration," "Jah Will Be Done", and "One Good Spliff". Later that year, the group reunited to perform at the "One Love All-Star Tribute Concert." The concert was recorded and released in the same year and features other performances from Rita Marley, Julian Marley, Erykah Badu, and other artists.

In 2000, the group released their live album Ziggy Marley & the Melody Makers Live, Vol. 1, which charted at no. 5 on the Top Reggae Albums chart. In May 2001, the group released a concert DVD, "Ziggy Marley & the Melody Makers Live". The DVD was filmed in 2000 in Pompano Beach, Florida.

== Disbanding and recent projects ==
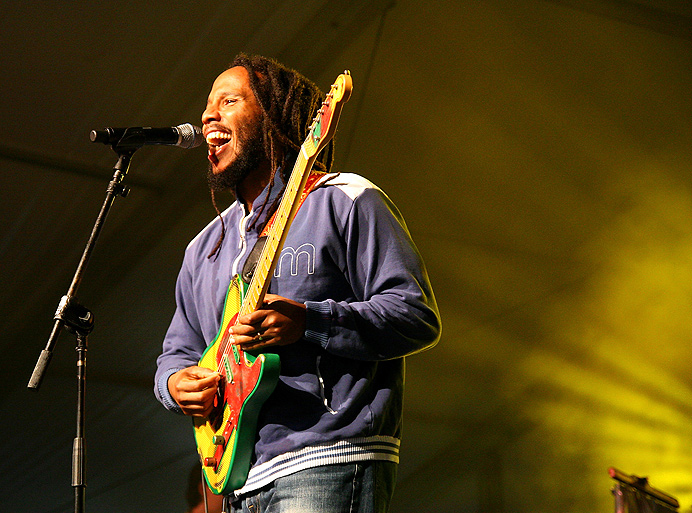
Ziggy Marley performed in 2007.

In 2003, Ziggy released his first album Dragonfly. In the same year, Stephen and his brother Damian put together an album called Educated Fools under the group name of Marley Boyz. They recorded it on the labels Ghetto Youths International and Tuff Gong International, collaborating with a number of other reggae artists including their brother Ky-Mani Marley.

Cedella currently lives in Miami, Florida, where she is the CEO of Tuff Gong International. She continues to tour with the Melody Makers internationally and perform on numerous TV shows. She has also developed a collection of customized women's clothing, named Catch A Fire, the title of one of her father's albums.

Sharon balances her prowess on stage with the Caribbean business of Ghetto Youth United, the Melody Makers support group and as the curator of the Bob Marley Museum.

Erica Newell, who was back-up vocalist for the group's tours, has pursued her solo career. She released a single "Inspire Me". She is currently working on her own album, which will be released her independent record label "Ouida International". She sings as a backing vocalist for Stephen Marley and continues to do her own shows.

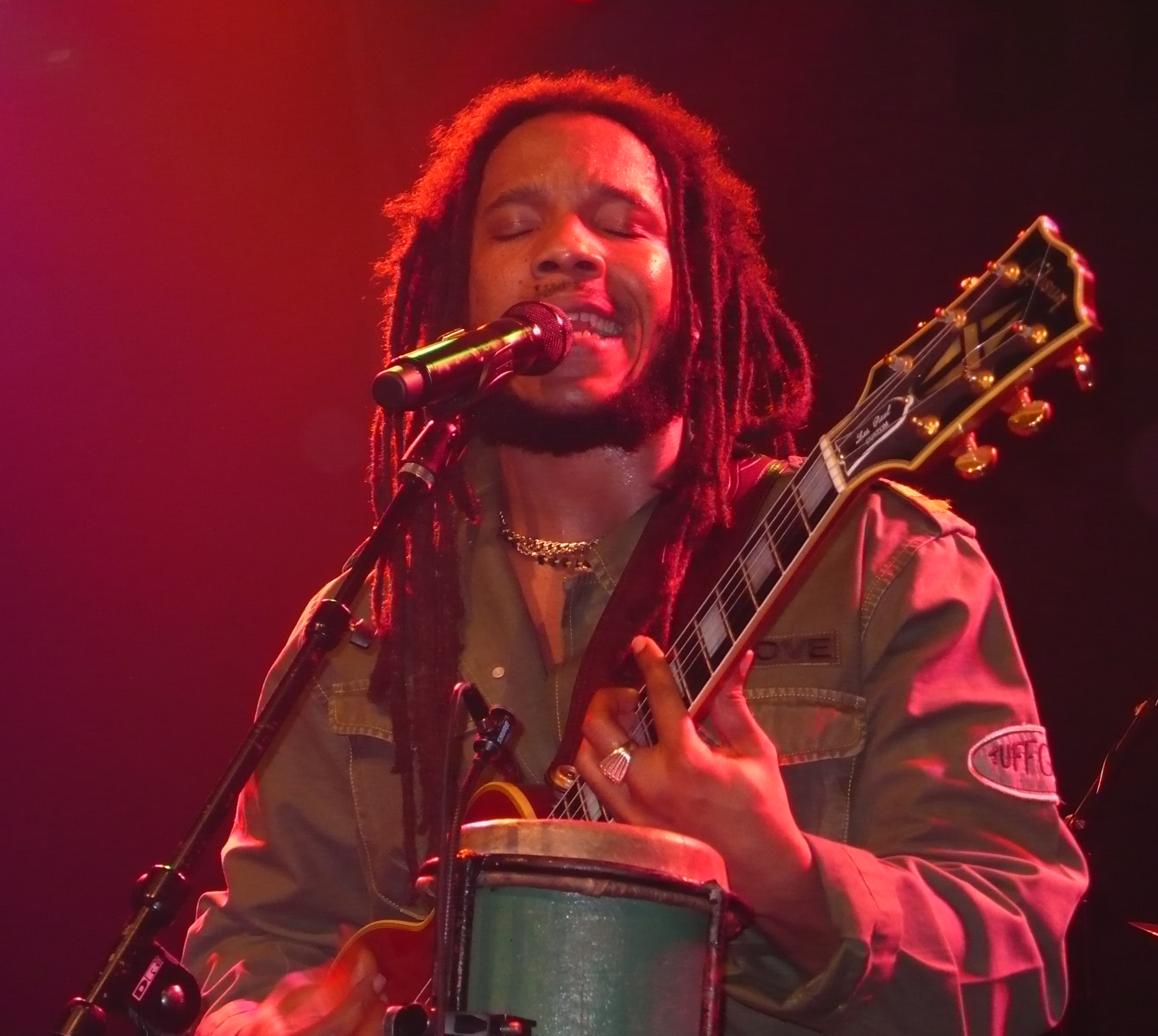
Stephen Marley performing in 2007.

In 2006, Ziggy released his second album Love Is My Religion, which earned a Grammy Award for "Best Reggae Album". In the following year, Stephen released his first album Mind Control in March 2007, which also earned a Grammy Award for "Best Reggae Album". In 2008, Ziggy released a live CD/DVD Love Is My Religion Live. In 2009, Ziggy released his third album Family Time. In the same year, Stephen joined Snoop Dogg and Slightly Stoopid on the Blazed and Confused 2009 Tour and released Mind Control Acoustic.

In February 2011, Cedella announced she would design the kit for the Jamaican track and field team at the 2012 Summer Olympics, including world champion Usain Bolt, under an arrangement with Puma. In May 2011, Stephen released his second album Revelation Part 1: The Root of Life. In July 2011, Ziggy released his fourth album Wild and Free. The album spawned the single "Forward to Love". In September 2011, Cedella released a book called One Love. Ziggy's Wild and Free album and Stephen's Revelation Part 1: The Root of Life each received a 2012 Grammy nomination, and Stephen won the 2012 GrammyAaward for "Best Reggae Album".

== Public image ==
Ziggy Marley and the Melody Makers were often compared to their father's group Bob Marley and the Wailers, a Jamaican reggae group. Jo-Ann Greene of All Music Guide stated, "The Melody Makers had a breezy pop style, and while it was impossible not to hear Bob in Ziggy's vocals, this only emphasized the incredible emotional qualities of his own voice."

== Discography ==
Albums

- 1979: Children Playing
- 1985: Play the Game Right
- 1986: Hey World!
- 1988: Conscious Party
- 1989: One Bright Day
- 1991: Jahmekya
- 1993: Joy and Blues
- 1995: Free Like We Want 2 B
- 1997: Fallen Is Babylon
- 1999: Spirit of Music

== Television and film appearances ==
- 1991: Sesame Street
- 1995: The Reggae Movie
- 1995: Family Matters (Episode: "Walking My Baby Back Home")
- 1996: Arthur (theme song)
- 1996: Muppet Treasure Island ("Love Power")
- 2008: Africa Unite: A Celebration of Bob Marley's 60th Birthday
- 2012: Marley

== Awards and nominations ==
Year	Category	Nominated work	Result
Grammy Awards
1986	Best Reggae Album	Play the Game Right	Nominated
1989	Best Reggae Album	Conscious Party	Won
1990	Best Reggae Album	One Bright Day	Won
1992	Best Reggae Album	Jahmekya	Nominated
1994	Best Reggae Album	Joy and Blues	Nominated
1996	Best Reggae Album	Free Like We Want 2 B	Nominated
1998	Best Reggae Album	Fallen Is Babylon	Won
