= Spirit of Music =

Studio album by Ziggy Marley and the Melody Makers
- Released: 1999
- Genre: Reggae
- Length: 67:50
- Label: Elektra
- Producer: Don Was, Ziggy Marley and the Melody Makers

Ziggy Marley and the Melody Makers chronology
Fallen Is Babylon (1997)	Spirit of Music (1999)

Professional ratings
Review scores
Source	Rating
AllMusic	4/5 stars
Daily Egyptian	4.5/5 stars

Spirit of Music is the ninth and final studio album by Ziggy Marley and the Melody Makers, released in 1999. The album peaked at No. 1 for Top Reggae Albums chart. Unlike their previous albums, it was not nominated for a Grammy award.

== Critical reception ==
Rosalind Cummings-Yeates of AllMusic concludes his review with, "Filled with soulful singing and easygoing melodies, this album is a must-have for even casual reggae fans."

Gus Bode of the Daily Egyptian begins his review of the album with, "Spirit of Music is like a comfortable, close friend. It sympathetically assures you it always will be by your side, no matter what circumstances arrive, while also encouraging you to live life to its fullest potential."

== Track listing ==
All tracks are written by David Marley, unless otherwise noted

No.	Title	Writer(s)	Length
1.	"Keep My Faith"		5:06
2.	"We Are One"		3:41
3.	"Beautiful Day"		3:51
4.	"Gone Away"		5:08
5.	"All Day All Night"	Bob Marley	4:14
6.	"Higher Vibration"		4:12
7.	"All I Need Is You"		3:33
8.	"One Good Spliff"	Stephen Marley	3:54
9.	"Let It Go"		5:26
10.	"13 Months Of Sunshine"		4:30
11.	"Many Waters"		4:37
12.	"High Tide Or Low Tide"	Bob Marley	3:59
13.	"Won't Let You Down"		4:16
14.	"Jah Will Be Done"		4:57
15.	"Too Much Waters" (hidden bonus track with "Many Waters" lyrics)		4:46
Total length:			67:50
