= Free Like We Want 2 B =

Studio album by Ziggy Marley and the Melody Makers
- Released: 1995
- Genre: Reggae
- Label: Elektra
- Producer: The Melody Makers

Ziggy Marley and the Melody Makers chronology
Joy and Blues (1993)	Free Like We Want 2 B (1995)	Fallen Is Babylon (1997)

Free Like We Want 2 B is an album by Ziggy Marley and the Melody Makers, released in 1995 by Elektra Records. It was nominated for a Grammy Award, in the "Best Reggae Album" category.

The album peaked at No. 170 on the Billboard 200. "Hand to Mouth" was a top 10 hit in Jamaica and "Power to Move Ya" charted number 13 on the Billboard Dance Music/Club Play Singles.

== Critical reception ==
Professional ratings
Review scores
Source	Rating
AllMusic	2.5/5 stars
Entertainment Weekly	A−

Trouser Press wrote that "Stephen steps out of his brother's happyface shadow with a sound and ideas of his own, rubbing salt in old political scars with the enervated resentment of 'Bygones'." Entertainment Weekly determined that "Ziggy refuses to be defined by his last name alone, but he soon he eases into the uplifting rhythms that are his birthright."

AllMusic wrote that "R&B and extensive use of keyboards enhance and strengthen the record, demonstrating that the band has the ability to grow and experiment while staying true to their Jamaican roots."

== Track listing ==
1. "Power To Move Ya" (David Marley)
2. "Free Like We Want 2 B" (David Marley)
3. "Today" (David Marley)
4. "Water and Oil" (David Marley; Stephen Marley)
5. "Live It Up" (David Marley)
6. "Tipsy Dazy" (Stephen Marley)
7. "Bygones" (Stephen Marley)
8. "Hand to Mouth" (David Marley; Stephen Marley)
9. "In The Flow" (David Marley)
10. "Don't Go Nowhere" (David Marley)
11. "G7" (David Marley)
12. "Keep On"" (Stephen Marley)
13. "Beautiful Mother Nature" (David Marley)

=== Song uses in other media ===
The documentary Life and Debt used the album's song "G7".
