= Fallen Is Babylon =

1997 studio album

Studio album by Ziggy Marley and the Melody Makers
- Released: 1997
- Genre: Reggae
- Length: 59:50
- Label: Elektra
- Producer: The Melody Makers

Ziggy Marley and the Melody Makers chronology
Free Like We Want 2 B (1995)	Fallen Is Babylon (1997)	Spirit of Music (1999)

Professional ratings
Review scores
Source	Rating
AllMusic	4.5/5 stars
Rolling Stone	3/5 stars

Fallen Is Babylon is the ninth album by Ziggy Marley and the Melody Makers, released in 1997. It won a Grammy award in the category of Best Reggae Album, and achieved commercial success with its single, "People Get Ready", produced by Michael Barbiero and Steve Thompson.

== Track listing ==
Standard edition
No.	Title	Length
1.	"Fallen Is Babylon"	4:14
2.	"Everyone Wants to Be"	3:45
3.	"People Get Ready" (Curtis Mayfield)	4:38
4.	"Postman by Stephen Marley"	3:50
5.	"Brotherly Sisterly Love"	3:27
6.	"Born to Be Lively"	5:37
7.	"Long Winter"	4:18
8.	"I Remember"	3:47
9.	"Day By Day"	5:24
10.	"Five Days a Year"	3:37
11.	"Notice"	4:08
12.	"Diamond City"	4:52
13.	"Jah Bless" (Vincent Ford)	4:00
14.	"People Get Ready" (R.H. Factor Reggae Vocal Mix)	3:53
Total length:		59:50
