= Tyrone Downie =

Jamaican keyboardist and pianist (1956–2022)

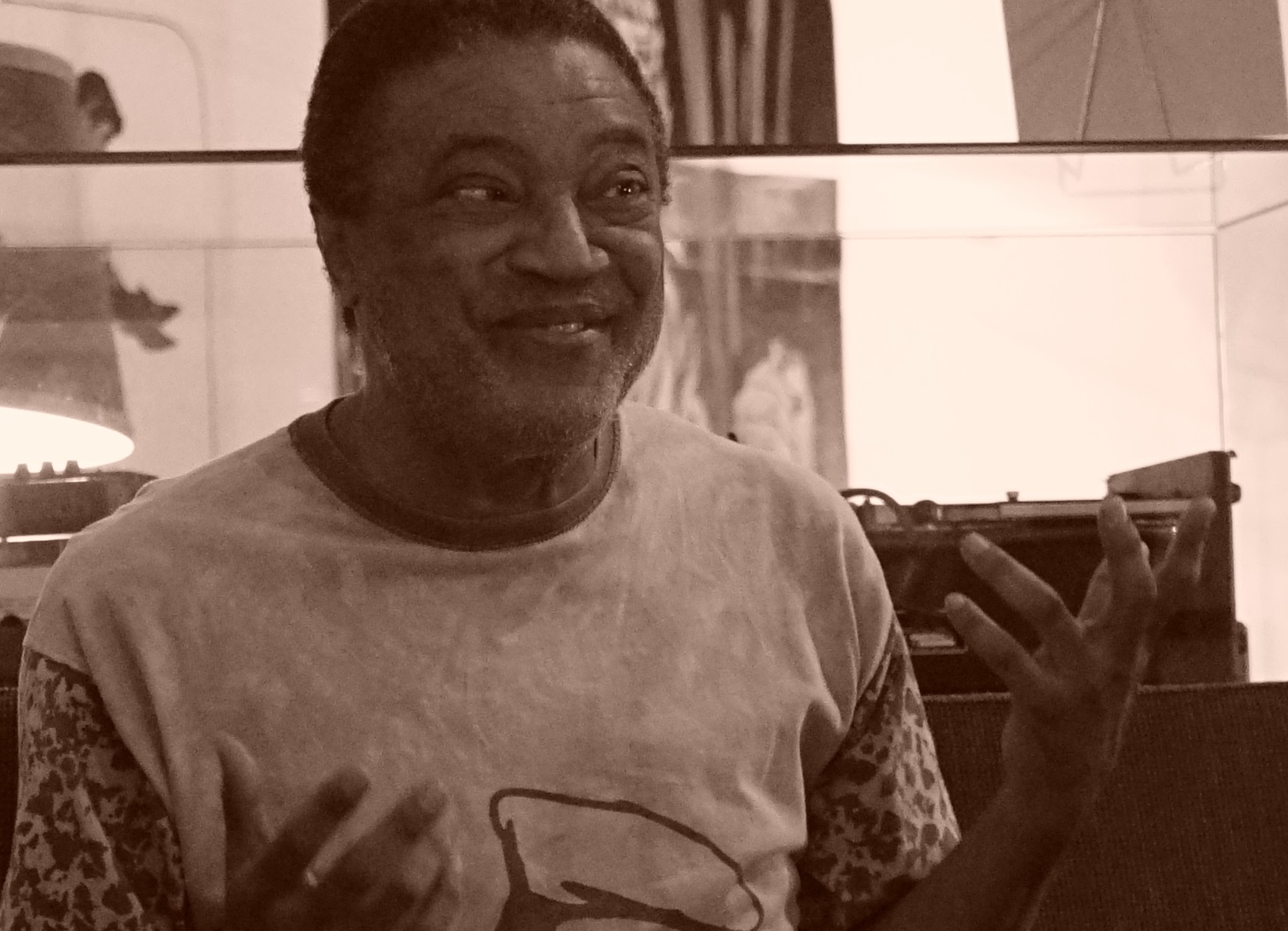
- Downie in 2016

Background information
- Also known as: Organ D
- Born: Tyrone Ralph Downie; 20 May 1956; Kingston, Jamaica
- Died: 5 November 2022 (aged 66) Kingston, Jamaica
- Genres: Reggae
- Occupations: Arranger, pianist, musician
- Instruments: Keyboards (piano, rhodes piano, organ, synthesizers, mellotron), guitar
- Years active: 1970–2022
- Formerly of: Bob Marley & The Wailers, The Wailers Band, Tom Tom Club, Peter Tosh, Burning Spear, Steel Pulse, Sly & Robbie Has also toured Zambia and elsewhere with Jimmy Cliff.

Tyrone Ralph Downie (20 May 1956 – 5 November 2022) was a Jamaican keyboardist and pianist best known for his involvement as a member of Bob Marley and the Wailers.

He studied at Kingston College and joined the Wailers in the mid-1970s, making his recording debut with the band on Rastaman Vibration, having previously been a member of the Impact All Stars. He also played with the Abyssinians, Beenie Man, Black Uhuru, Buju Banton, Peter Tosh, Junior Reid, Tom Tom Club, Ian Dury, Burning Spear, Steel Pulse, Alpha Blondy, Tiken Jah Fakoly and Sly & Robbie. He resided in France and was a member of the touring band of Youssou N'Dour, whose album Remember he produced.

In 1983, Grace Jones released the single "My Jamaican Guy". Unbeknown to Downie, he (though in a relationship and not romantically linked to Jones) was the subject of the song.

Downie released the solo album Organ-D in 2001.

Downie played keyboards on the album 'Maroon Songs: Born Free, Live Free, Ever Free' with Earl Chinna Smith's InnadeYard Binghistra Movement, released on August 17, 2022.

Downie died in Kingston on 5 November 2022, at the age of 66.
