= Rita Marley =

Jamaican reggae singer (born 1946)

The Honourable Rita Marley OJ OD
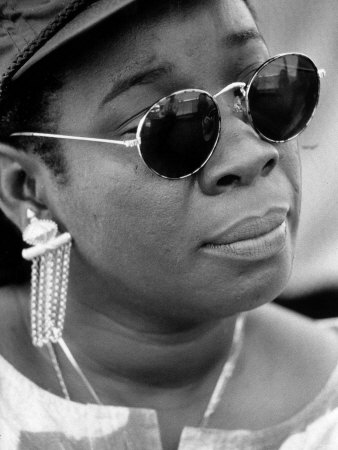
- Marley in 2011
- Born: Alfarita Constantia Anderson; 25 July 1946 (age 80); Santiago de Cuba, Cuba
- Occupations: Singer; songwriter
- Years active: 1966–2016
- Spouse: Bob Marley (m. 1966; died 1981)
- Children: 6, including Sharon, Cedella, Ziggy & Stephen
- Relatives: Skip Marley (grandson); Jo Mersa Marley (grandson); Bambaata Marley (grandson); Donisha Prendergast (granddaughter)
- Musical career
- Origin: Kingston, Jamaica
- Genre: Reggae
- Instruments: Vocals
- Labels: Shanachie; JAD
- Formerly of: Bob Marley and the Wailers; The I Threes

Alfarita Constantia "Rita" Marley (née Anderson; born 25 July 1946) is a Jamaican reggae singer. She is the widow of reggae musician Bob Marley. Along with Marcia Griffiths and Judy Mowatt, Rita was a member of the reggae vocal group the I Threes, and the backing vocalists for Bob Marley and the Wailers.

== Early life ==
Rita Marley was born in Santiago de Cuba, to Leroy Anderson and Cynthia "Beda" Jarrett. Her parents moved to Kingston, Jamaica, when she was three months old. In her memoir, No Woman No Cry: My Life with Bob Marley, Rita describes how she was raised by her Aunt Viola after her parents separated. She was raised in Trenchtown in Kingston, Jamaica.

Marley's Cuban birth has been questioned by her mother-in-law Cedella Booker, suggesting she may have been born in Jamaica. A visa application was denied after officials determined she was not born in Cuba and could not obtain status as a Cuban refugee. Marley herself said she was once told she was born in Cuba, but she "never traced it."

== Career ==
Rita was a founding member of the Soulettes with her cousin Constantine Walker, and Marlene Gifford. The Soulettes released recordings including rocksteady tunes such as "Time for Everything", "Turn! Turn! Turn!" (released in 1966, written by folk singer Pete Seeger) and "A Deh Pon Dem". "Friends and Lovers", "One More Chance" and "That Ain't Right" (featuring harmony vocals by the Wailers), as well as a duet by Marley and Bunny Wailer ("Bless You"), which was issued years later on the Lovers and Friends album.

After recording for Studio One and being coached by Bob Marley, Rita married Bob around February 1966, just before he moved to Wilmington, Delaware, for a few months to make a living working at the Dupont Hotel there. Bob was replaced by her cousin Constantine "Vision" Walker, who recorded a few songs as a member of The Wailers during this period, with Rita Marley providing harmonies.

=== The Wailers ===
Upon Bob's return at the end of the summer of 1966, Bunny Wailer, Peter Tosh and Bob created their independent label Wail 'n' Soul'm, which released several records by Bob Marley and the Wailers, as well as Peter Tosh and the Wailers 45 rpm single records including Bend Down Low, Hypocrites and Tosh's Dem Haffi Get a Beatin' in 1966–1968.

As Bunny was jailed in 1968 for cannabis possession, Rita joined the Wailers, replacing Bunny for a few months. It is at that time that The Wailers met American singer Johnny Nash, who produced a series of Wailers rocksteady recordings. In April 1968 Nash's manager Danny Sims signed Tosh, Rita Marley and her husband, Bob Marley to exclusive publishing, management, and production contracts in exchange for a few dollars and an opportunity to record in Kingston for the New York-based JAD label owned by Johnny Nash, musician Arthur Jenkins and Sims.

Musicians on this 1968 Wailers session feature Tosh and the Marleys. Rita Marley sang vocals on a dozen fine rocksteady and soul tracks, most of which were not issued at the time. New recordings of Bend Down Low and Mellow Mood got issued as a single in the U.S. under the name "Bob, Rita and Peter".

The original 1968 sessions including all of the original musicians — and without the horns — eventually surfaced on the Freedom Time album issued in 2003 by JAD's partner in France (55 Records) after producer Bruno Blum finally mixed them in Paris from the original four-track tapes. One song, "Play Play Play", features Rita Marley on lead vocals with harmonies sung by Peter and Bob Marley. Another Rita Marley-sung tune, "Lonely Girl", and a pop duet with Bob, "Milk Shake and Potato Chips", were finally released in 2003 on the Rebel JAD/55 long box set.

=== The I Threes ===
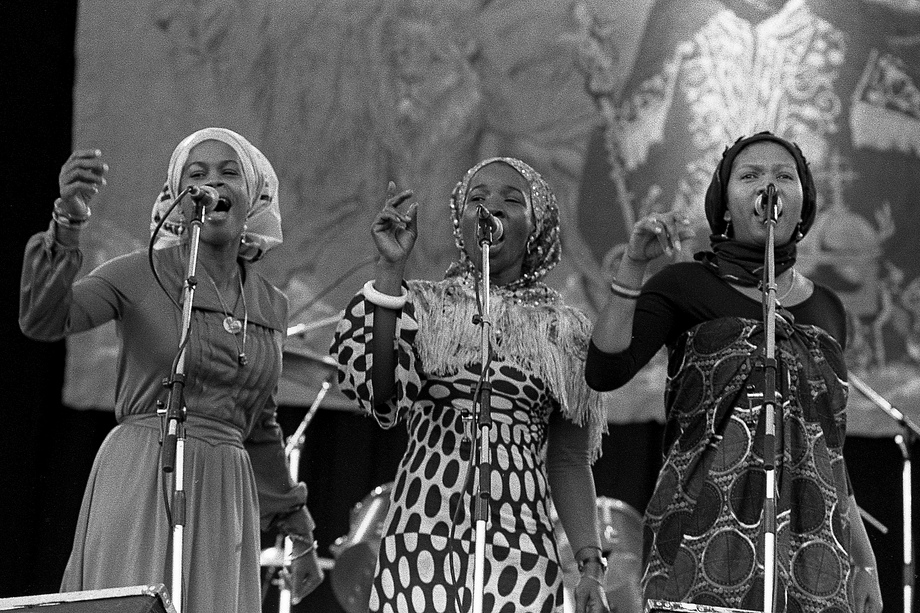
Marley (center) performing with the I-Threes in 1980

Following the birth of their second child, Ziggy Marley in 1968, Bob returned to Delaware in 1969 to work on the night shift in a Chrysler factory. Bunny had returned to the Wailers at the end of 1968 and Rita did not record with Bob until 1974, when her husband formed the I Three harmony vocal group featuring Marcia Griffiths and Judy Mowatt to replace Peter and Bunny, who had left the band in 1973.

Together with the I Three, Bob Marley & the Wailers recorded the album Natty Dread in 1974, rising to international stardom with the track "No Woman No Cry". It was followed by the 1976 album Rastaman Vibration featuring the track "Roots, Rock, Reggae". On 3 December 1976 two days before the Smile Jamaica Concert, a large free concert organized by Bob Marley with the support of Jamaican Prime Minister Michael Manley, Rita, Bob, and manager Don Taylor were wounded in an assault on the Marley home by gunmen affiliated with Manley's enemies. Rita survived a shot to the head and Taylor sustained serious injuries from being shot in the leg. Bob had a bullet skid his chest and wound his arm, but nevertheless played this major show in Kingston with Rita by his side.

== Later years ==
In 1981, Rita Marley purchased Ken Khouri's Federal Records recording studio, the island's first pressing plant, and the company subsequently moved from 56 Hope Road to 220 Marcus Garvey Drive, where it continues to operate.

Tuff Gong studio is one of the largest Caribbean studios and features the second-largest live recording space on the island with artists, musicians, producers and tourists traveling from around the world to visit the facility.

In 1986, Rita Marley decided to convert Bob Marley's home into the Bob Marley Museum. She is the founder and chairwoman of the Robert Marley Foundation, Bob Marley Trust, and the Bob Marley Group of Companies.

In 2000, Rita created the Rita Marley Foundation, a non-governmental, not-for-profit, non-partisan organization that works to alleviate poverty and hunger in developing countries. It targets elderly and youth. It has given out a number of scholarships to music students in Ghana. It hosts the annual Africa Unite concerts which strives to spread global awareness about issues that affect Africa and to develop lasting solutions. She adopted 35 children in Ethiopia and has assisted over 200 children in Konkonuru Methodist School in Ghana.

In 1996, Rita Marley was conferred the Order of Distinction by the Jamaican government for her contributions to the development of Jamaican music and culture.

In 2010, Rita was conferred with the prestigious Marcus Garvey Lifetime Achievement Award.

On 3 August 2013, she was made an honorary citizen of Ghana by the Ghanaian government after living there for many years. In November 2015 Marley was awarded an honorary Doctor of Letters degree by the University of the West Indies. In 2017 she received her second honorary Doctorate degree by University of Fort Hare, South Africa.

In September 2016, Marley suffered a stroke while on a visit to Miami to attend a special event and has kept a low public profile since. She made her first public appearance since then at an award ceremony in Kingston on March 9, 2019, along with her fellow I Three members Marcia Griffiths and Judy Mowatt to accept the Iconic Award (For a Duo/Group), given by the Jamaica Reggae Industry Association.

In 2019, Marley was honoured by the Jamaican Government with its fourth-highest national honour, Order of Jamaica (OJ).

In October 2022, Rita was awarded the Jamaican Consulate General's Lifetime Achievement Award and was also honored by the South Miami Dade Cultural Arts Center during Jamaica's National Dance Theatre Company (NDTC)

On 22 March 2024, she was honoured by the International Reggae And World Music Awards (IRAWMA) for her extensive philanthropic work throughout her life. She established the Rita Marley Foundation, which focuses on alleviating poverty and hunger and providing education in Ghana and Jamaica.

On 1 July 2024 on International Reggae Day, Rita received the Winnie Mandela Humanitarian Award at the JulyOne celebrations hosted by the City of Miramar in Florida and Consul General Oliver Mair. Tuff Gong Records celebrates Rita’s birthday each year with a livestreamed concert held at the Bob Marley Museum, the 2025 concert, titled Rhythms of Rita, was held on July 25, 2025.

Rita has six children, three with Bob and three from other relationships. Bob adopted Rita's two other children as his own and they have the Marley name. Rita's children are, in order of birth:

1. Sharon Marley, born 23 November 1964 (daughter of Rita from a previous relationship but then adopted by Marley after his marriage with Rita)
2. Cedella Marley born 23 August 1967
3. "Ziggy Marley" (David Nesta Marley), born 17 October 1968
4. Stephen Marley, born 20 April 1972
5. Stephanie Marley, born 17 August 1974 (from Owen "Ital Tacky" Stewart, a former Jamaican soccer player) Bob adopted her, giving her official recognition as one of his children, thereby entitling her to his estate.
6. Serita Stewart, born 11 August 1985 (born after Bob's death to Owen "Ital Tacky" Stewart, Stephanie's biological father)

== Discography ==
- 1966: Pied Piper, Rio
- 1980: Rita Marley – Trident
- 1981: Who Feels It Knows It, Shanachie Records
- 1982: "Harambe (Working Together for Freedom)", Shanachie Records
- 1986: "Beginning", I-Three, EMI / TUFF GONG
- 1988: We Must Carry On, Shanachie Records
- 1990: Beauty of God's, Shanachie Records
- 1990: Good Girls Culture, Shanachie Records
- 1990: One Draw, Shanachie Records
- 2003: Sings Bob Marley...and Friends, Shanachie Records
- 2004: Play Play, Universal Music
- 2005: Sunshine After Rain
- 2006: Gifted Fourteen Carnation

=== Appearances ===
- 1966: The Soulettes – Time for Everything (Jamaica All Stars compilation album), Studio One
- 1968: The Wailers – Pay Play Play and Rhapsody (released on the Freedom Time album in 2003), JAD
- 1983: John Denver – "World Game" (with The Wailers and Marcia Griffiths), It's About Time, RCA
- 1996: Khaled – "Ouelli El Darek" (with the I Three), Sahra, Wrasse Records

=== Collaborations ===
- 1995: Rita Marley / Ignacio Scola / Gregorio Paniagua: Spectacles For Tribuffalos, TABATA Música y Letra
- 2006: Fergie / Rita Marley & The I-3's: "Mary Jane Shoes" – The Dutchess

== Books ==
- No Woman, No Cry: My Life with Bob Marley (2004) Rita Marley, Hettie Jones, Hyperion ISBN 0-7868-6867-8
- Harambe for the Holidays: Vibrant Holiday Cooking with Rita Marley (2014) Cedella Marley, Rita Marley
