= Tuff Gong =

Bob Marley family record label and studio

- Parent company: Marley Family
- Founded: 1970
- Founder: Bob Marley
- Distributors: Island Records; Republic Records
- Genre: Reggae
- Country of origin: Jamaica/United Kingdom/United States
- Official website: https://www.tuffgong.com/

Tuff Gong is the brand name associated with a number of businesses started by Bob Marley and the Marley family. 'Tuff Gong' comes from Marley's nickname, which was in turn an echo of that given to founder of the Rastafari movement, Leonard "The Gong" Howell.

== Record label ==
Tuff Gong is a record label formed by the reggae group the Wailers in 1970. Before 1981, the label used the facilities of Federal Records recording company in Marcus Garvey Drive. The first single on the label was "Run For Cover" by the Wailers. After 1973, the Tuff Gong headquarters was located at 56 Hope Road, Kingston, Jamaica – Bob Marley's home. The location is now home to the Bob Marley Museum.

The Tuff Gong label is distributed by Universal Music through Island Records.

Tuff Gong is the official Caribbean distributor of Warner Music Group, Universal Music Group, and Disney Music Group.

In Rockstar Games and Rockstar North's Grand Theft Auto IV, Tuff Gong Radio is based on the record label and is featured as one of the many fictional radio stations featured in-game. The station is dedicated to playing songs associated with Bob Marley, including tracks by his sons Stephen Marley and Damian "Jr. Gong" Marley.

== Recording studio ==
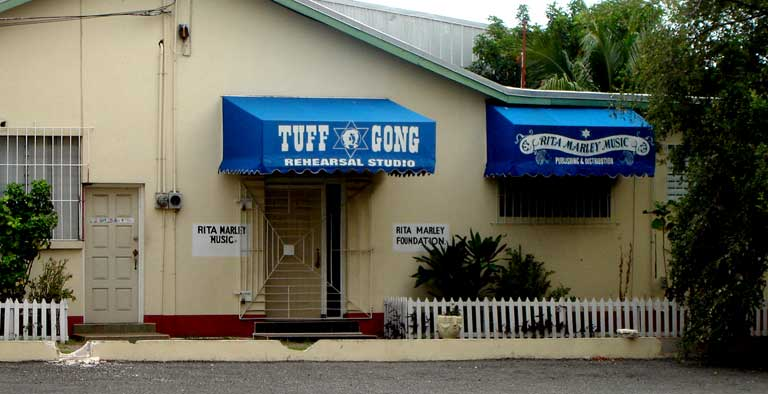
The Tuff Gong Recording Studio

Tuff Gong is a full-service recording studio located in Kingston, Jamaica. In 1981, Bob Marley's wife, Rita Marley, purchased Ken Khouri's Federal Records recording studio, the island's first record pressing plant, and the company subsequently moved from 56 Hope Road to 220 Marcus Garvey Drive, where it continues to operate.

- List of record labels
