= Ziggy Marley discography =

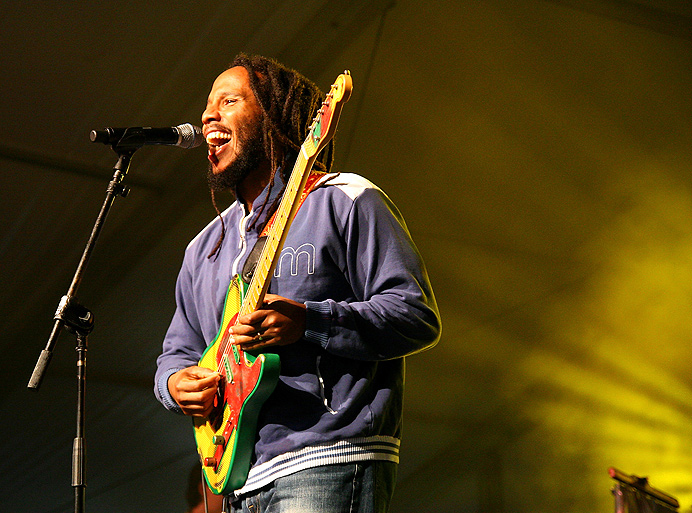
- Ziggy Marley performing in 2007.
- Studio albums: 8
- Live albums: 4
- Compilation albums: 2
- Singles: 12
- Video albums: 1

This is a listing of official releases by Ziggy Marley, a Jamaican singer and musician from 2003–present. Marley started his musical career with some of his brothers and sisters as the Melody Makers in the 1980s; he performed and recorded albums with them from 1983 to 2001. The discography of his recordings with the Melody Makers is elsewhere.

His first solo album, Dragonfly, was released in 2003, and followed by Love Is My Religion in 2006. Love is My Religion won the 2007 Grammy for Best Reggae Album. In 2009, Marley released his third album Family Time. Family Time won the 2010 Grammy for Best Musical Album for Children.

== Albums ==
=== Studio albums ===
Year	Album	Chart positions						Sales and certifications
Year	Album	US	US R&B	US Reggae	US Ind.	US Internet	US Kids	Sales and certifications
2003	Dragonfly: Released: April 15, 2003; Labels: Tuff Gong Worldwide; Formats: CD, digital download	138	84	3	—	—	—	US sales: 60,000+
2006	Love Is My Religion: Released: July 2, 2006; Labels: Tuff Gong Worldwide; Formats: CD, digital download	—	—	6	—	—	—	US sales: 200,000+
2009	Family Time: Released: May 5, 2009; Labels: Tuff Gong Worldwide; Formats: CD, digital download	149	—	1	20	180	2	US sales: 50,000+
2011	Wild and Free: Released: June 14, 2011; Labels: Tuff Gong Worldwide; Formats: CD, digital download	152	—	1	26	—	—	US sales: N/A
2014	Fly Rasta: Released: April 15, 2014; Labels: Tuff Gong Worldwide; Formats: CD, digital download	129	—	1	—	—	—	US sales: N/A
2016	Ziggy Marley: Released: February 22, 2016; Labels: Tuff Gong Worldwide; Formats: CD, digital download	99	—	1	10	—	—	US sales: N/A
2018	Rebellion Rises: Released: May 18, 2018; Labels: Tuff Gong Worldwide; Formats: CD, digital download	193	—	1	10	—	—	
2020	More Family Time: Released: September 18, 2020; Labels: Tuff Gong Worldwide; Formats: CD, digital download	—	—	—	—	—	—	
"—" denotes releases that did not chart.

=== Live ===
Year	Album details
2008	Love Is My Religion Live: Released: February 12, 2008; Label: Tuff Gong Worldwide; Formats: CD, DVD, digital download
2009	Ziggy Live from SoHo: Released: August 26, 2009; Label: Tuff Gong Worldwide; Formats: Digital download
2013	Ziggy Marley In Concert: Released: Label: Tuff Gong Worldwide; Formats: CD, DVD, digital download
2017	We are the People Tour: Released: Label: Tuff Gong Worldwide; Formats: digital download

=== Compilations ===
Year	Album details
2008	Ziggy Marley in Jamaica: Released: July 15, 2008; Label: Tuff Gong Worldwide; Formats: CD, digital download
2009	Tuff Gong Worldwide Music Sampler: Released: August 11, 2009; Label: Tuff Gong Worldwide; Formats: CD, digital download

=== Soundtrack appearances ===
- 2011: Beat the World

== Singles ==
- 2003: "True to Myself"
- 2003: "Dragonfly"
- 2003: "Rainbow in the Sky"
- 2006: "Love Is My Religion"
- 2006: "Into the Groove"
- 2006: "A Lifetime"
- 2009: "Family Time"
- 2009: "I Love You Too"
- 2009: "ABC"
- 2010: "Africa Land"
- 2011: "Jammin' in the Rain"
- 2011: "Jamaica in My Head"
- 2011: "Forward to Love"

=== As featured artist ===
- 2014: "Love" (Cody Simpson feat. Ziggy Marley)

== Video releases ==
Year	Video details
2008	Love Is My Religion Live: Released: February 12, 2008; Label: Tuff Gong Worldwide; Formats: CD, DVD, digital download
