= Rebellion Rises =

Studio album by Ziggy Marley
- Released: May 18, 2018
- Studio: Barefoot Studio; The Village Recorder
- Genre: Reggae
- Length: 35:12
- Label: Tuff Gong Worldwide
- Producer: Ziggy Marley

Ziggy Marley chronology
Ziggy Marley (2016)	Rebellion Rises (2018)	More Family Time (2020)

Rebellion Rises is the seventh solo studio album by Jamaican musician Ziggy Marley. It was released on May 18, 2018, via Tuff Gong Worldwide. Recording sessions took place at Barefoot Studio and at the Village Recorder. Production was handled by Ziggy Marley himself. The album peaked at number 59 on the Swiss Hitparade, number 136 on the Dutch Album Top 100, number 193 on the Billboard 200, number 10 on the Independent Albums and atop the Reggae Albums charts in the United States. At the 61st Annual Grammy Awards, the album received a Grammy Award for Best Reggae Album nomination, but lost to 44/876.

== Track listing ==
All tracks are written by David Marley, except track 2 is written with Gideon Marley, track 3 is written with Samuill Kalonji, and track 8 is written with Stephen Marley.

No.	Title	Length
1.	"See Dem Fake Leaders"	3:58
2.	"The Storm Is Coming"	3:47
3.	"World Revolutuion"	3:22
4.	"Your Pain Is Mine"	3:23
5.	"Change Your World"	3:43
6.	"I Will Be Glad"	3:37
7.	"High on Life"	3:04
8.	"Circle of Peace"	3:21
9.	"I Am a Human"	3:31
10.	"Rebellion Rises"	3:26
Total length:		35:12

== Charts ==
=== Weekly charts ===
Chart (2018)	Peak position
Dutch Albums (Album Top 100)	136
Swiss Albums (Schweizer Hitparade)	59
US Billboard 200	193
US Independent Albums (Billboard)	10
US Reggae Albums (Billboard)	1

=== Year-end charts ===
Chart (2018)	Position
US Reggae Albums (Billboard)	5
