= Ken Chastain =

American musician

Kenneth Lee Chastain (born October 15, 1964, Hanover, New Hampshire) is a musician, engineer, and producer currently living in Minneapolis, Minnesota. He is featured on percussion on Ziggy Marley's Love Is My Religion album and many other well-known artists' works. Chastain also composes, produces, engineers, and mixes for TV and film projects, most notably the movie Sweet Land.

== History ==
Chastain was born in New Hampshire, and lived in France and Morocco with his Peace Corps parents before moving to Minnesota. He played Suzuki cello and was a soloist in the Metropolitan Boys Choir in the Twin Cities. He went on to the University of Minnesota and the Berklee College of Music in Boston to study music, audio engineering and film scoring.

He plays bass, guitar, keyboards, trumpet, harmonica, Chapman Stick, theremin, and percussion.

== Pixel Farm ==
As head of audio post-production at Pixel Farm Minneapolis, and chief engineer and composer for Pixel Farm Music, Ken Chastain scores music, sound designs, and mixes award-winning television commercials and films. Recent award-winning commercials include Garmin's Super Bowl XLII offering “Napoleon” and United Airlines' "Dragon".

Commercials for: Porsche / Goodyear / Purina / Coca-Cola / Garmin / Best Buy / Target / BMW / United Airlines

Film credits:

- Sweet Land (Winner, Best First Feature Spirit Award for Independent Film)
- Older Than America (Premiered at SXSW and the Walker Art Center “Women of Vision”
- Funkytown
- Pathfinder
- Urban Explorers
- Tromeo and Juliet
- Detective Fiction
- Hotel Hidajet

In the music world Chastain can be heard playing on records from Switchfoot and Mike Doughty to Grammy Award-winning Ziggy Marley.

Music credits: Ziggy Marley / Dan Wilson / Mandy Moore / Mike Doughty / Clay Aiken / Andrew W.K. / Pink / Backstreet Boys / Semisonic / Glen Phillips / Switchfoot

Appearances: The Tonight Show NBC / The Larry Sanders Show HBO / South by Southwest / Sundance Film Festival

Miscellaneous:

- NBA theme songs for the Detroit Pistons and Cleveland Cavaliers
- Weisman Art Museum installation “Voyager”

== Discography ==
Artist	Title	Record company	Credit
Ziggy Marley	Love Is My Religion	TuffGong Worldwide	EM
Stuart D’Rozario	Songs About Now	SAN	EPM
Har Mar Superstar	The Handler	Record collection	EM
Mike Doughty	Haughty Melodic	ATO	EM
Switchfoot	Nothing Is Sound	Sparrow Records	EM
Evan and Jaron	Evan and Jaron	Columbia	EM
TerraMara	FourBlocksToHennepin	Redhead	EPM
Pink	Try This	LaFace	EM
Mandy Moore	Coverage	EPIC	EM
Backstreet Boys	Never Gone	Jive Records	EM
Andrew W.K.	I Get Wet	Island Records	E
Semisonic	All About Chemistry	MCA	M
The Rembrandts	LP	Atlantic	E
The Honeydogs	Here’s Luck	Palm Pictures	M
Nick Lachey	Dear Santa	LGM	EM
Iffy	Biota Bondo	FoodChain Records	M
Rhythm Jones	Al America	GSM	EPM
TerraMara	Dragonfly	Redhead	EPM
The Januaries	The Januaries	Foodchain	M
Johnny Clueless	What's Your Flavour	Boxof Records	EPM
FLIPP	Blow It Out Your Ass	Rock Steady	EPM
Greazy Meal	Gravy	TRG records	EPM
Greazy Meal	Visualize World Greaze	TRG records	EPM
Greazy Meal	Digitalize World Greaze	TRG records	EPM
Asche & Spencer	Unsupervised Recreation	A&S	EM
Tangletown	Freakshow	Zinc records	M
Willie Wisely	She	October records	EPM
Willie Wisely	Turbosherbert	October records	EM
Honeywagon	Finger Twister	Mache House	EPM
Mango Jam	Flux	Shanachie records	EPM
Tina and the B-sides	Live 1st Ave	T CD	M
Marlee MaCleod	Vertigo	TRG records	M
Various Mpls artists	Mpls Does Denver	October records	EPM
Beat the Clock	Self-titled	Booty rock records	EPM
Beat the Clock	Funk Bus	Booty rock / Gark Records	EPM
Eclectic Stew	Temple of Doom (single)	Phillips compact disc	EPM
Funky Ass Loops	New Power Generation	East West CD ROM	M
Smoov Grooves	New Power Generation	East West CD ROM	M
Trip Shakespeare	Volt EP	Clean	E
BUG!	BUG!	October records	E
Johnny Clueless	Too Late Too Loud	Oarfin records	M
Native Sons	Lost in Time	October records	EM
Bone Club	Beautiful	Rocket sound record co.	E
Raye	No Limits to Love	Metro records	EM
Legion of Boom	Self-titled	Metro records	EPM
The Andersons	A Minnesota Christmas	Gold-n-boy records	EM
40 Thieves	Self-titled	Metro records	E
G. B. Leighton	One Time One Life	Metro records	M
Bill Bruce	Young Harold Visits	Skeleton crew records	EM
Casablanca Orch	CBO	Metro records	E
The Other Side	A Month of Sundays	Metro records	EPM
Garth	Homeward Bound	Acoustic Innovations	E
903	Takin Care of Business	903 Productions inc.	EPM
Marc Allen	Self-titled	Mars records	EM
One Horse	Power	Dream house records	E
Scott Aveles	Aveles	Metro records	EM
Jack Richter	The Richter Scale	Metro records	EM
The Nielson White Band	Self-titled	Metro records	E
Natalie Allen	Smokin	Metro / Natco records	EM
Trouble Shooter	Borderline	Metro records	EM
