= Brightside =

Brightside may refer to:

== Places ==
- Brightside, Sheffield, district of Sheffield, South Yorkshire, England
  - Shiregreen and Brightside, ward in Sheffield
  - Sheffield Brightside (UK Parliament constituency), former parliament constituency
  - Sheffield Brightside and Hillsborough (UK Parliament constituency)
  - Brightside railway station a closed station in Sheffield
- Brightside, California, in Alameda County, U.S.
- Brightside, Ontario, a township in eastern Ontario, Canada

== Music ==
- Brightside (band), a pop rock band from Tallahassee, Florida, United States
- Brightside (Killing Time album), by Killing Time
- Brightside (The Lumineers album), by the Lumineers
  - "Brightside" (The Lumineers song), the title track from the album
- Brightside (Viva Saturn album), an album by the American band Viva Saturn
- Brightside (EP), by Rich Brian
- "Brightside" (Icona Pop song), by Icona Pop
- "Mr. Brightside", a song by The Killers

== Other uses ==
- Bright Side (YouTube channel), a YouTube channel
- Brightside Group, an insurance broking and financial services business
- BrightSide Technologies, a display technology company
- Emu (II) / Brightside (ferry), a ferry used in Brisbane and Sydney between 1865 and 1908
- Samsung Brightside, a cell phone released in 2012
