= Conan the Barbarian (1982 soundtrack) =

1982 soundtrack album by Basil Poledouris

The music for the 1982 sword-and-sorcery film Conan the Barbarian featured the original score composed by Basil Poledouris. The film, directed by John Milius, starred Arnold Schwarzenegger in the titular protagonist and James Earl Jones as the antagonist. The score was written in 1981 and recorded during late-November. It predominantly featured an array of synthesizers and orchestral instruments. The first issue of the score coincided with the release in 1982, with MCA Records distributing. Later subsequent re-issues followed with Varèse Sarabande and Geffen Records, and an expanded edition featuring the complete score was published by Intrada Records in 2012. Conan's score received acclaim with Poledouris becoming one of the sought out composers in Hollywood.

== Background and development ==
Milius recruited his friend, Basil Poledouris, to produce the score for Conan; they had had a successful collaboration on Big Wednesday. The film industry's usual practice was to contract a composer to start work after the main scenes had been filmed, but Milius hired Poledouris before principal photography had started. The composer was given the opportunity to compose the film's music based on the initial storyboards and to modify it throughout filming before recording the score near the end of production. Poledouris made extensive use of Musync, a music and tempo editing hardware and software system invented by Robert Randles (subsequently nominated for an Academy Scientific and Technical Award), to modify the tempo of his compositions and synchronize them with the action in the film. The system helped make his job easier and faster; it could automatically adjust tempos when the user changed the positioning of beats. In the montage where Conan grows up, for example, Poledouris had Randles prepare, over the phone, a long accelerando that landed on precise moments in the picture along the way. Poledouris would otherwise have had to conduct the orchestra and adjust his compositions on the fly. Conan is the first film to list Musync in its credits.

Milius and Poledouris exchanged ideas throughout production, working out themes and "emotional tones" for each scene. According to Poledouris, Milius envisioned Conan as an opera with little or no dialogue; Poledouris composed enough musical pieces for most of the film (around two hours' worth). This was his first large-scale orchestral score, and a characteristic of his work here was that he frequently slowed down the tempo of the last two bars (segments of beats) before switching to the next piece of music. Poledouris said the score uses a lot of fifths as its most primitive interval; thirds and sixths are introduced as the story progresses. The composer visited the film sets several times during filming to see the imagery his music would accompany. After principal photography was completed, Milius sent him two copies of the edited film: one without music, and the other with its scenes set to works by Richard Wagner, Igor Stravinsky, and Sergei Prokofiev, to illustrate the emotional overtones he wanted.

== Production and composition ==
Poledouris said he started working on the score by developing the melodic line—a pattern of musical ideas supported by rhythms. The first draft was a poem sung to the strumming of a guitar, composed as if Poledouris was a bard for the barbarian. This draft became the "Riddle of Steel", a composition played with "massive brass, strings, and percussion", which also serves as Conan's personal theme. The music is first played when Conan's father explains the riddle to him. Laurence E. MacDonald, Professor of Music at Mott Community College, said the theme stirs up the appropriate emotions when it is repeated during Conan's vow to avenge his parents. The film's main musical theme, the "Anvil of Crom", which opens the film with "the brassy sound of 24 French horns in a dramatic intonation of the melody, while pounding drums add an incessantly driven rhythmic propulsion" is played again in several later scenes.

Poledouris completed the music that accompanies the attack on Conan's village at the beginning of the film in October 1981. Milius initially wanted a chorus based on Carl Orff's Carmina Burana to herald the appearance of Doom and his warriors in this sequence. After learning that Excalibur (1981) had used Orff's work, he changed his mind and asked his composer for an original creation. Poledouris's theme for Doom, titled "Riders of Doom", consists of "energetic choral passages", chanted by the villain's followers to salute their leader and their actions in his name. The lyrics were composed in English and roughly translated into Latin; Poledouris was "more concerned about the way the Latin words sounded than with the sense they actually made." He set these words to a melody adapted from the 13th-century Gregorian hymn, Dies irae, which was chosen to "communicate the tragic aspects of the cruelty wrought by Thulsa Doom."

The film's music mostly conveys a sense of power, energy, and brutality, yet tender moments occur. The sounds of oboes and string instruments accompany Conan and Valeria's intimate scenes, imbuing them with a sense of lush romance and an emotional intensity. According to MacDonald, Poledouris deviated from the practice of scoring love scenes with tunes reminiscent of Romantic period pieces; instead, Poledouris made Conan and Valeria's melancholic love theme unique through his use of "minor-key harmony". David Morgan, a film journalist, heard Eastern influences in the "lilting romantic melodies". Page Cook, audio critic for Films in Review, describes Conan the Barbarian's score as "a large canvas daubed with a colorful yet highly sensitive brush. There is innate intelligence behind Poledouris's scheme, and the pinnacles reached are often eloquent with haunting intensity."

== Recording ==
From late November 1981, Poledouris spent three weeks recording his score in Rome. He engaged a 90-instrument orchestra and a 24-member choir from the Accademia Nazionale di Santa Cecilia and the RAI National Symphony Orchestra, and conducted them personally. The pieces of music were orchestrated by Greig McRitchie, Poledouris's frequent collaborator. The chorus and orchestra were recorded separately. The 24 tracks of sound effects, music, and dialog were downmixed into a single-channel, making Conan the Barbarian the last film released by a major studio with a mono soundtrack. According to Poledouris, Raffaella De Laurentiis balked at the cost ($30,000) of a stereo soundtrack and was worried over the lack of theaters equipped with stereo sound systems.

== Releases ==
=== Original 1982 MCA album ===
Conan the Barbarian

Film score by Basil Poledouris
- Released: 1982
- Studios: International Recording Studios, Rome; The Burbank Studios, Burbank, California; A&M Studios, Hollywood, California
- Genre: Film score
- Length: 46:42
- Label: MCA
- Producer: Basil Poledouris

Basil Poledouris chronology
The Blue Lagoon (1980)	Conan the Barbarian (1982)	Summer Lovers (1982)

The first album was issued by MCA Records in 1982 featuring 12 tracks in CDs and LPs.

Track listing
No.	Title	Length
1.	"Anvil Of Crom"	2:30
2.	"Riddle Of Steel / Riders Of Doom"	5:31
3.	"Gift Of Fury"	3:47
4.	"Wheel Of Pain"	4:05
5.	"Atlantean Sword"	3:53
6.	"Theology / Civilization"	3:10
7.	"Wifeing" (Theme Of Love From "Conan The Barbarian")	2:07
8.	"The Search"	3:05
9.	"The Orgy"	4:10
10.	"Funeral Pyre"	4:28
11.	"Battle Of The Mounds"	4:48
12.	"Orphans Of Doom / The Awakening"	5:28
Total length:		46:42

=== 1992 Varèse Sarabande edition ===
Conan the Barbarian

Film score (re-issue) by Basil Poledouris
- Released: 1992
- Studios: International Recording Studios, Rome; The Burbank Studios, Burbank, California; A&M Studios, Hollywood, California
- Genre: Film score
- Length: 67:20
- Label: Varèse Sarabande
- Producer: Basil Poledouris

A later re-issue followed in 1992 with Varèse Sarabande publishing the album that had four additional tracks.

Track listing
No.	Title	Length
1.	"Anvil Of Crom"	2:34
2.	"Riddle Of Steel / Riders Of Doom"	5:36
3.	"Gift Of Fury"	3:50
4.	"Wheel Of Pain"	4:09
5.	"Atlantean Sword"	3:50
6.	"Theology / Civilization"	3:13
7.	"Wifeing" (Theme Of Love From "Conan The Barbarian")	2:10
8.	"The Leaving / The Search"	5:59
9.	"Mountain Of Power Procession"	3:21
10.	"The Tree Of Woe"	3:31
11.	"Recovery"	2:11
12.	"The Kitchen / The Orgy"	6:30
13.	"Funeral Pyre"	4:29
14.	"Battle Of The Mounds"	4:52
15.	"Death Of Rexor"	5:34
16.	"Orphans Of Doom / The Awakening"	5:31
Total length:		67:20

=== City of Prague Philarmonic Orchestra performance ===
Conan the Barbarian

Film score (expanded) by Basil Poledouris and City of Prague Philharmonic Orchestra conducted by Nic Raine
- Released: November 2, 2010
- Recorded: 2010
- Genres: Film score; orchestral
- Length: 121:53
- Label: Prometheus

The complete score was performed by City of Prague Philharmonic Orchestra which was conducted by Nic Raine. A world premiere of the performance was published as an album on November 2, 2010, distributed by Prometheus Records.

Disc 1
No.	Title	Length
1.	"Prologue (Film Version) / Anvil Of Crom"	3:37
2.	"Riddle Of Steel / Riders Of Doom"	5:33
3.	"The Gift Of Fury"	3:25
4.	"Column Of Sadness / Wheel Of Pain"	4:09
5.	"Pit Fights"	2:45
6.	"Prologue (Original Version)"	1:03
7.	"Atlantean Sword"	3:59
8.	"Wolf Witch"	3:21
9.	"Theology / Civilization"	3:03
10.	"The Street Of Deviants / Hopefuls At The Tower Of Set"	1:28
11.	"The Tower Of Set / Snake Attack (Las Cantigas De Santa Maria)"	5:20
12.	"Infidels"	1:02
13.	"The Tavern"	1:51
14.	"The Wifeing"	2:19
15.	"In The Court Of King Osric"	1:12
16.	"Conan Leaves Valeria / The Search"	6:02
17.	"The Mountain Of Power / Capture"	3:59
18.	"The Tree Of Woe / Recovery"	6:04
Total length:		60:12

Disc 2
No.	Title	Length
1.	"The Kitchen / The Orgy"	6:22
2.	"Orgy Fight"	2:52
3.	"Funeral Pyre"	5:15
4.	"Battle Preparations / Battle Of The Mounds Part I"	5:58
5.	"Battle Of The Mounds Part II"	2:11
6.	"Battle Of The Mounds Part III / Night Of Doom"	5:55
7.	"Head Chop"	0:53
8.	"Orphans Of Doom / The Awakening"	6:28
9.	"Epilogue / End Titles"	5:13
10.	"Bonus Track: Theology / Civilization (Alternate Version)"	3:27
11.	"Bonus Track: The Tower Of Set (Alternate Cues)"	3:36
12.	"Bonus Track: The Battle Of The Mounds Part II (Original Version)"	2:11
13.	"Bonus Track: Chamber Of Mirrors From "Conan The Destroyer""	7:15
14.	"Bonus Track: Riders Of Doom (Orchestral Version)"	4:05
Total length:		61:41

=== Intrada Records expanded edition ===
Conan the Barbarian

Film score (expanded) by Basil Poledouris
- Released: November 26, 2012
- Studios: International Recording Studios, Rome; The Burbank Studios, Burbank, California; A&M Studios, Hollywood, California
- Genre: Film score
- Length: 186:45
- Label: Intrada
- Producer: Basil Poledouris

On November 26, 2012, Intrada Records released an expanded edition of the album in a three-disc format. The album featured the complete score along with the contents from the original 1982 album and alternative recordings and outtakes which did not make it into the original album.

Disc 1
No.	Title	Length
1.	"Prologue / Anvil Of Crom"	3:39
2.	"Riddle Of Steel / Riders Of Doom"	5:40
3.	"Gift Of Fury"	3:51
4.	"Column Of Sadness / Wheel Of Pain"	4:10
5.	"Pit Fights"	2:40
6.	"The Discipline Of Steel / Freedom Council"	1:38
7.	"Atlantean Sword"	4:01
8.	"Warm Welcome"	2:06
9.	"Wolf Witch"	3:10
10.	"Theology / Civilization"	3:14
11.	"Street Of Deviants"	0:29
12.	"Hopefuls At The Tower Of Set"	2:22
13.	"The Tower Of Set"	5:38
14.	"The Snake / Infidels"	2:01
15.	"The Tavern"	1:14
16.	"Wifeing (Theme Of Love From "Conan The Barbarian")"	2:11
17.	"Indulgence / Mettle"	1:15
18.	"The Hall Of King Osric"	1:18
19.	"The Leaving / The Search"	5:58
Total length:		56:35

Disc 2
No.	Title	Length
1.	"The Mountain Of Power Procession"	3:22
2.	"Capture"	0:52
3.	"Tree Of Woe / Recovery"	5:46
4.	"Warpaint"	1:10
5.	"The Kitchen / The Orgy"	6:30
6.	"The Defilers"	5:16
7.	"Funeral Pyre"	4:32
8.	"Battle Of The Mounds Part I"	4:52
9.	"Battle Of The Mounds Part II"	2:16
10.	"Battle Of The Mounds Part III (Revised)/Night Of Doom"	5:36
11.	"Head Chop"	0:57
12.	"Orphans Of Doom / The Awakening"	5:33
13.	"Conan The King / End Title"	5:28
14.	"The Extras: Prologue (First Version)"	0:46
15.	"Anvil Of Crom (First Version)"	2:31
16.	"The Tower Of Set Part 1 (First Version)"	3:46
17.	"Battle Of The Mounds Part II (First Version)"	2:16
18.	"Battle Of The Mounds Part III (First Version)"	3:03
19.	"Orphans Of Doom (Orchestra and Solo Voice)"	1:22
20.	"Orphans Of Doom (Chorus and Harp)/The Awakening (First Version)"	6:45
21.	""Las Cantigas De Santa Maria" (The Snake)"	6:01
Total length:		78:40

Disc 3
No.	Title	Length
1.	"Original 1982 album: Anvil Of Crom"	2:35
2.	"Riddle Of Steel / Riders Of Doom"	5:38
3.	"Gift Of Fury"	3:51
4.	"Wheel Of Pain"	4:10
5.	"Atlantean Sword"	3:51
6.	"Theology / Civilization"	3:14
7.	"Wifeing (Theme Of Love From "Conan The Barbarian")"	2:11
8.	"The Search"	3:09
9.	"The Orgy"	4:16
10.	"Funeral Pyre"	4:30
11.	"Battle Of The Mounds"	4:54
12.	"Orphans Of Doom/The Awakening"	5:32
13.	"One last extra: Prologue (W/Narration) / Anvil Of Crom"	3:39
Total length:		51:30

== Reception ==
Conan's score received acclaim from critics. Craig Lysy of Movie Music UK deciphered his score to be "crowning achievement" and also his apogee and magnum opus. Lysy admitted the score to be "supremely lyrical, abounds in wondrous chorus, hosts a multiplicity of themes and motif expressions, and bears an uncommon beauty" that provided a timeless quality and "gain Poledouris immortality". Christian Clemmensen of Filmtracks described it as "a complex score that sounds surprisingly primitive and brutal". Stephen Thomas Erlewine of AllMusic called it a "dramatic, exciting score" where "grand, sweeping arrangements capture the roaring adventure of the film." James Southall of Movie Wave described it to be a "fantastic" film score which makes it a "fantastic album". At the 10th Saturn Awards, the score was recognized for Best Music while also receiving a nomination at the AFI's 100 Years of Film Scores which revealed in 2005.

== Legacy and impact ==
Basil Poledouris' reputation in the film industry increased with the critical acclaim his score received; MacDonald noted Poledouris's work on Conan as "one of the most spectacular film music achievements of the decade", and Page Cook named it as the only reason to watch the film and as the second best film sound track after E.T. the Extra-Terrestrial that released the same year. After hearing Conan's music, Paul Verhoeven engaged Poledouris to score his films, Flesh and Blood (1985), RoboCop (1987) and Starship Troopers (1997). The music in Verhoeven's Total Recall (1990) also bore the influence of Conan's score; its composer, Jerry Goldsmith, used Poledouris's work as the model for his compositions.
