= Looner =

Looner can refer to:

- Looner (band), a pop rock band
- Looner, a person with a balloon fetish
