= Tuff Gong Worldwide =

Record label

- Parent company: 56 Hope Road
- Founded: 2006
- Founder: Ziggy Marley
- Genre: Reggae; Dancehall
- Country of origin: Jamaica/United States
- Official website: http://www.tuffgongworldwide.com/

Tuff Gong Worldwide is a record label formed by Ziggy Marley. He used the same name as his father's label, but changed the word international to worldwide.

== History ==
Ziggy Marley started the label under his father's name, changing the international to worldwide. He started the label to do what his father, Bob Marley, couldn't do and make a label that does more than just his own work.

In 2006, Ziggy Marley released his second solo album as the first album on the label. The same year, he released a live version of the album on both CD and DVD. Also that year, a compilation album titled "Ziggy Marley in Jamaica" got released where Ziggy Marley released rare reggae classics.

In 2009, Ziggy Marley released a live album as part of iTunes's "Live from SoHo" series. He released his first children's album titled "Family Time" on the label.

In 2010, he released another compilation album titled "Dancehall Originators" that featured Original Dancehall mixes.

== Discography ==
- 2003: Dragonfly
- 2006: Love Is My Religion
- 2008: Love Is My Religion Live
- 2008: Ziggy Marley in Jamaica
- 2009: Ziggy Live From Soho
- 2009: Family Time
- 2009: Tuff Gong Worldwide Music Sampler
- 2010: Dancehall Originators
- 2011: Wild and Free
- 2013: In Concert
- 2014: Fly Rasta
- 2016 Ziggy Marley
