= Grammy Award for Best Musical Album for Children =

Retired Grammy Award

- Awarded for: quality children's music albums
- Country: United States
- Presented by: National Academy of Recording Arts and Sciences
- First award: 1994
- Final award: 2011
- Website: grammy.com

The Grammy Award for Best Musical Album for Children was an honor presented to recording artists for quality children's music albums at the Grammy Awards, a ceremony that was established in 1958 and originally called the Gramophone Awards. Honors in several categories are presented at the ceremony annually by the National Academy of Recording Arts and Sciences of the United States to "honor artistic achievement, technical proficiency and overall excellence in the recording industry, without regard to album sales or chart position".

The award for Best Musical Album for Children was first presented to producer Alan Menken and Tim Rice in 1994 for the soundtrack to the Disney film Aladdin.

The award was discontinued from 2012 in a major overhaul of Grammy categories. Starting in 2012, this category merged with the Best Spoken Word Album for Children category to form the new Best Children's Album category. This merger meant essentially returning to the categorization set-up prior to 1994 (although with a small name change), when recordings for children was covered by the Grammy Award for Best Album for Children alone.

== Recipients ==
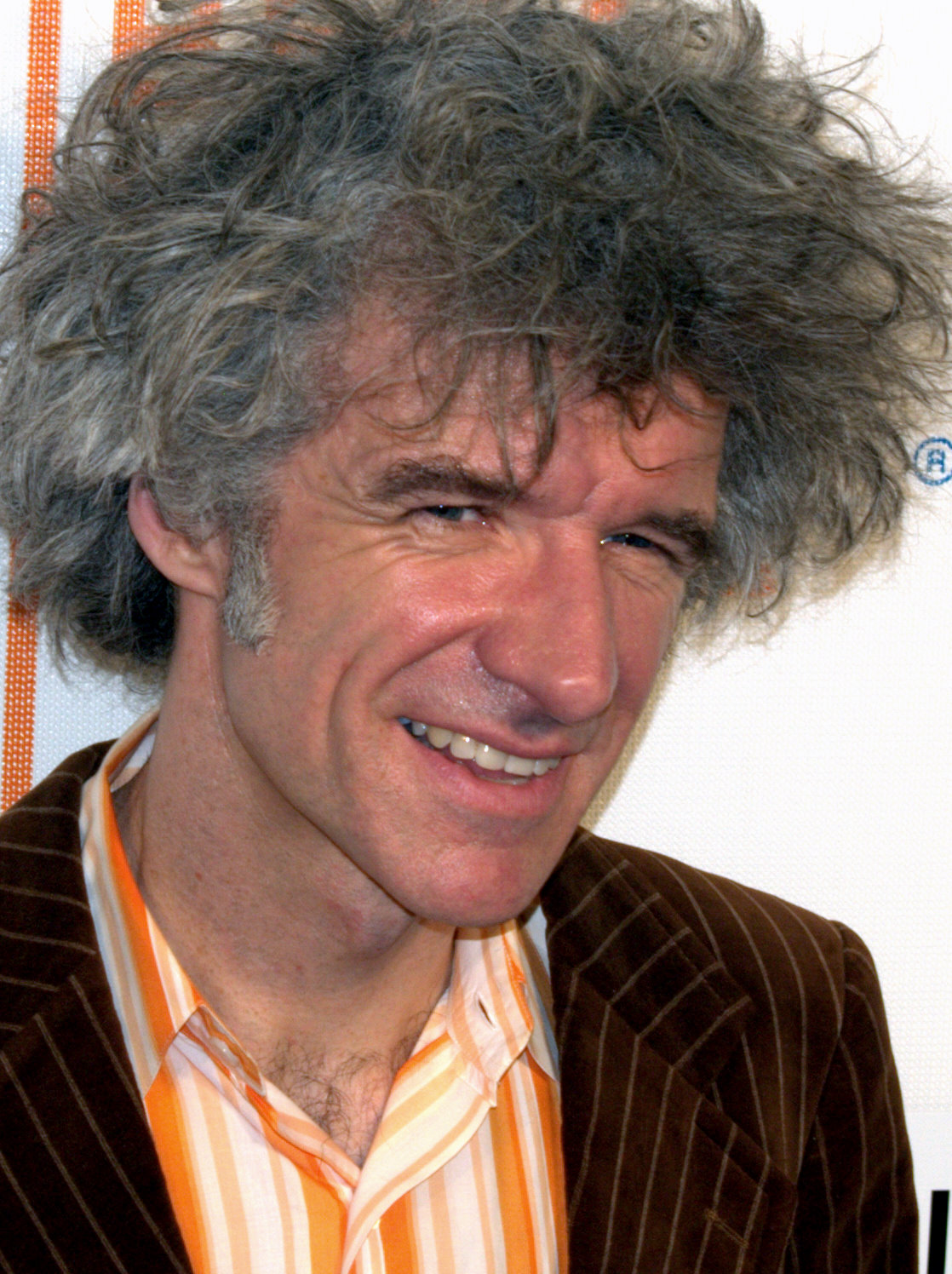
Dan Zanes of the 2007 award-winning group Dan Zanes and Friends in 2009

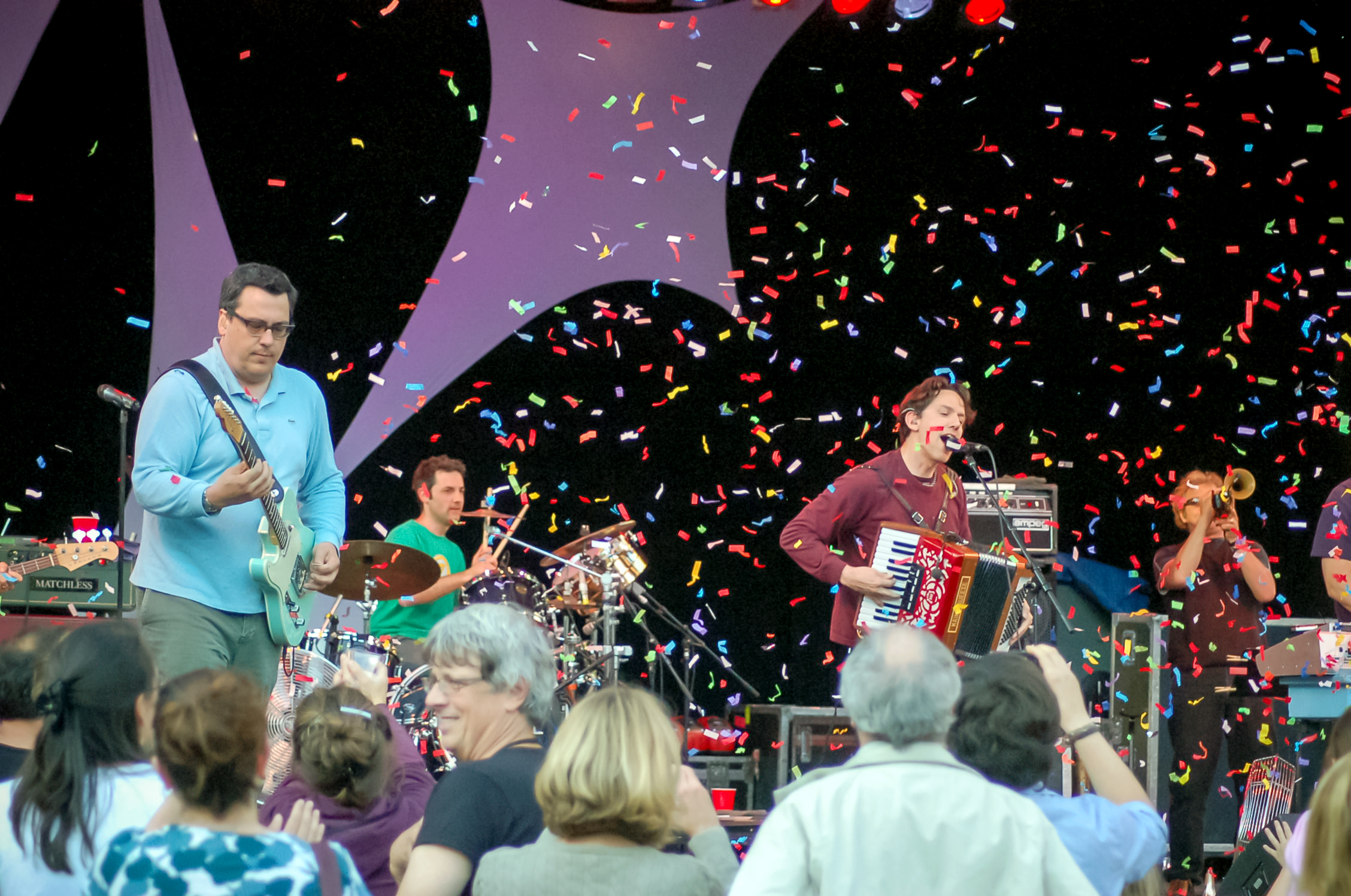
Members of the 2009 award-winning group They Might Be Giants performing in 2009

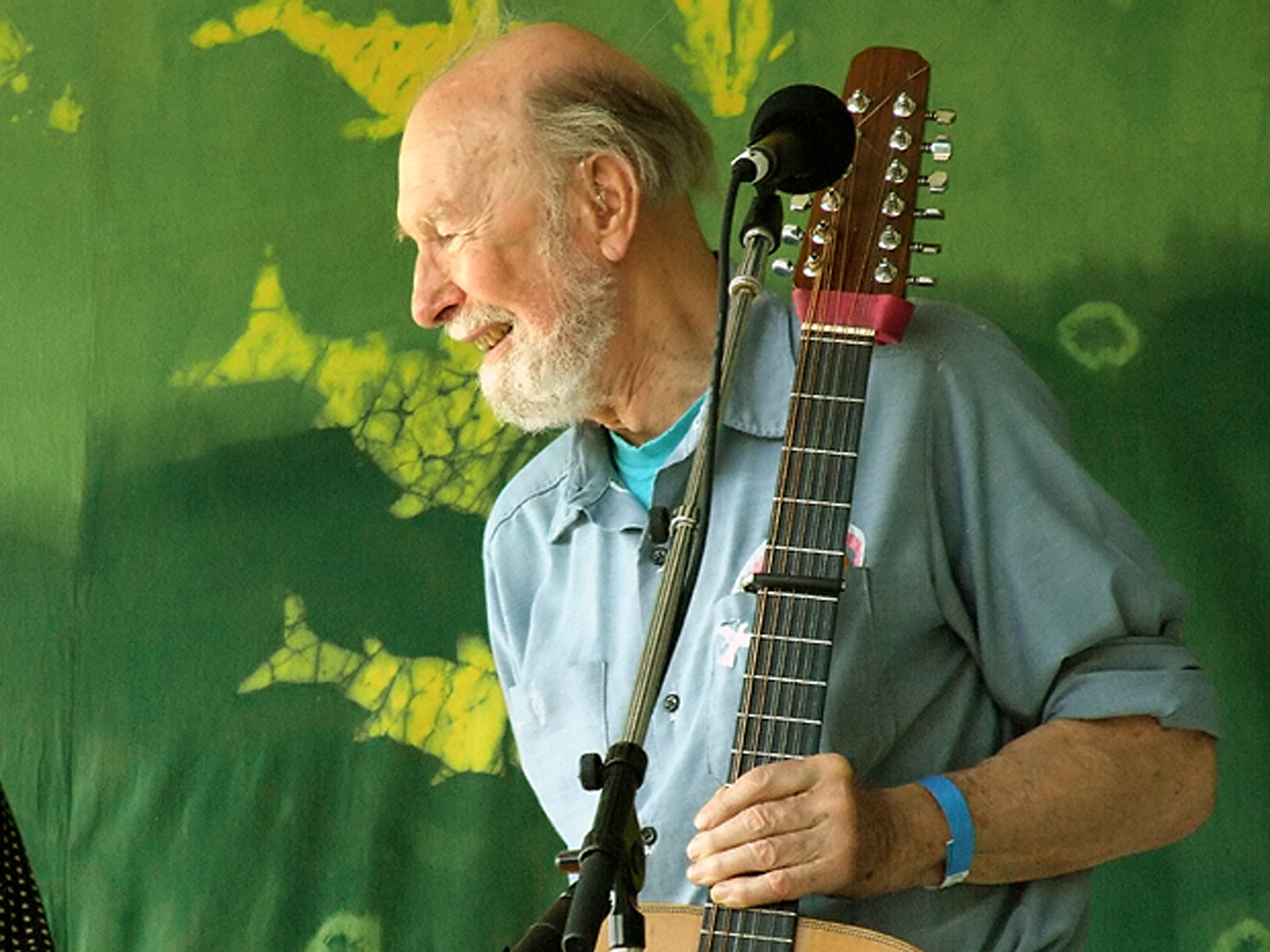
Pete Seeger, 2011 award winner for Tomorrow's Children, at the Clearwater Festival in 2007

Year^{[I]}	Performing artist(s)	Work	Producer(s)^{[II]}	Nominees	Ref.
1994	Various artists	Aladdin: Original Motion Picture Soundtrack	Alan Menken; Tim Rice	Barney's Favorites, Vol. 1 - Barney & Friends; The Muppet Christmas Carol: Original Motion Picture Soundtrack - The Muppets; Peter, Paul & Mommy, Too - Peter, Paul and Mary; The Nightmare Before Christmas: Original Motion Picture Soundtrack - various artists	
1995	Various artists	The Lion King: Original Motion Picture Soundtrack	Mark Mancina; Jay Rifkin; Chris Thomas; Hans Zimmer	Bananaphone - Raffi; Little Sleepy Eyes - various artists; The Manhattan Transfer Meets Tubby the Tuba - Peter, Paul and Mary; Return to Pooh Corner - Kenny Loggins	
1996	Barbara Bailey Hutchison	Sleepy Time Lullabys	J. Aaron Brown; David R. Lehman	Papa's Dream - Los Lobos with Lalo Guerrero; John McCutcheon's Four Seasons: Summersongs - John McCutcheon; Pocahontas Sing-Along - original cast; Winnie The Pooh's Take My Hand - various artists	
1997	Linda Ronstadt	Dedicated to the One I Love	George Massenburg; Linda Ronstadt	John McCutcheon's Four Seasons: Wintersongs - John McCutcheon; Around the World and Back Again - Tom Chapin; Blanket Full of Dreams - Cathy Fink & Marcy Marxer; Love Songs and Lullabyes for Daddy's Little Dreamer - various artists	
1998	John Denver	All Aboard!	John Denver; Roger Nichols; Kris O'Connor	Bigger Than Yourself - John McCutcheon; Shakin' A Tailfeather - Taj Mahal, Eric Bibb & Linda Tillery; Songs from a Parent to a Child - Art Garfunkel; This Land Is Your Land: An All American Children's Folk Classic - Arlo Guthrie	
1999	Various artists	Elmopalooza!	John Boylan	Changing Channels - Cathy Fink & Marcy Marxer; In My Hometown - Tom Chapin; John McCutcheon's Four Seasons: Autumnsongs - John McCutcheon; The Playground - Tony Bennett	
2000	Various artists	The Adventures of Elmo in Grouchland	Andy Hill	A Bug's Life Sing-Along - Various Artists; Dreamosaurus - Dinorock; Ella Jenkins And A Union Of Friends Pulling Together - Ella Jenkins; John McCutcheon's Four Seasons: Springsongs - John McCutcheon; Mannheim Steamroller Meets the Mouse - Mannheim Steamroller	
2001	Riders in the Sky	Woody's Roundup: A Rootin' Tootin' Collection of Woody's Favorite Songs	—	More Songs from Pooh Corner - Kenny Loggins; Pillow Full Of Wishes - Cathy Fink & Marcy Marxer; Still The Same Me - Sweet Honey in the Rock; This Pretty Planet - Tom Chapin	
2002	Various artists	Elmo & the Orchestra	Ed Mitchell	All Wound Up! A Family Music Party - Cathy Fink & Marcy Marxer with Brave Combo; Big Wide Grin - Keb' Mo'; InFINity - Trout Fishing in America; Little House Of Music Level 1 Package - Georgia S. Lucking	
2003	Riders in the Sky	Monsters, Inc. Scream Factory Favorites	—	Beethoven's Wig - Sing Along Symphonies - Richard Perlmutter; Big Songs For Little Kids - I Feel Like Praising - Various Artists; Pocket Full Of Stardust - Cathy Fink & Marcy Marxer; Your Shoes, My Shoes - Tom Paxton	
2004	Cathy Fink & Marcy Marxer	Bon Appétit!	—	Baby's Broadway Lullabies - Ilene Graff; Making Good Noise - Tom Chapin; Philadelphia Chickens - various artists; When Bullfrogs Croak - Tom Paxton	
2005	Various artists	cELLAbration! A Tribute to Ella Jenkins	Cathy Fink & Marcy Marxer	Beethoven's Wig 2 - More Sing Along Symphonies - Beethoven's Wig; House Party - Dan Zanes and Friends; Merry Fishes To All - Trout Fishing In America; Sharing Cultures With Ella Jenkins - Ella Jenkins	
2006	Various artists	Songs from the Neighborhood: The Music of Mister Rogers	Dennis Scott	Be Bop Your Best! - Red Grammer; Green Gorilla, Monster & Me - Ralph's World; Scat Like That: A Musical Word Odyssey - Cathy Fink & Marcy Marxer; Some Assembly Required - Tom Chapin	
2007	Dan Zanes and Friends	Catch That Train!	—	Baby Einstein Meet The Orchestra - Various Artists; Beethoven's Wig 3: Many More Sing Along Symphonies - Beethoven's Wig; My Best Day - Trout Fishing In America; The Sunny Side of the Street - John Lithgow	
2008	The Muppets	The Muppets: A Green and Red Christmas	Ted Kryczko; Ed Mitchel	Chickens - Buck Howdy with BB; Experience...101 - Sweet Honey in the Rock; I Wanna Play - Bill Harley; My Green Kite - Peter Himmelman; The Velveteen Rabbit - Love Can Make You Real - various artists	
2009	They Might Be Giants	Here Come the 123s	Pat Dillett; They Might Be Giants	Beethoven's Wig 4: Dance Along Symphonies - Beethoven's Wig; Big Round World - Trout Fishing In America; Here Comes Brady Rymer And The Little Band That Could - Brady Rymer And The Little Band That Could; The Shoe Bird - Gerard Schwarz conducting the Seattle Symphony	
2010	Ziggy Marley	Family Time	Ziggy Marley; Don Was	American Heroes #3 - Jonathan Sprout; Banjo To Beatbox - Cathy Fink & Marcy Marxer with Christylez Bacon; Great Day - Milkshake; Jumpin' & Jammin' - Greg & Steve; Pete Seeger Tribute — Ageless Kids' Songs' - Buck Howdy	
2011	Pete Seeger	Tomorrow's Children	David Bernz; Daniel Einbender; Travis Jeffrey	Here Comes Science - They Might Be Giants; Jungle Gym - Justin Roberts; Sunny Days - Battersby Duo; Weird Things Are Everywhere!' - Judy Pancoast	

^{^[I]} Each year is linked to the article about the Grammy Awards held that year.
^{^[II]} Producer(s) are only indicated if they were presented a Grammy Award.

== See also ==
- Children's song
- Juno Award for Children's Album of the Year
