= Hollywood 90028 =

1973 American film

- Promotional poster
- Directed by: Christina Hornisher
- Screenplay by: Christina Hornisher
- Produced by: Christina Hornisher
- Cinematography: John H. Pratt
- Edited by: Leon Ortiz-Gil
- Music by: Basil Poledouris
- Production company: US3
- Distributed by: American Films Ltd.
- Release date: August 26, 1976
- Running time: 88 minutes (Note: Varying cuts of the film have been released under different titles, with some running 76 minutes and others 90 minutes. The cut released by Grindhouse Releasing that screened at the Sitges Film Festival runs approximately 88 minutes in length.)
- Country: United States
- Language: English

Hollywood 90028 is a 1973 American exploitation film written, produced, and directed by Christina Hornisher and starring Christopher Augustine and Jeannette Dilger. It follows an isolated cinematographer in Los Angeles whose feelings of alienation lead him to murder.

Completed in 1973, the film was not released theatrically until late 1976. It received subsequent re-releases over the following several years under alternate titles such as The Hollywood Hillside Strangler and Twisted Throats.

Hollywood 90028 did not receive television distribution or any home media releases until 2024, after it was rediscovered and remastered by Grindhouse Releasing. The film screened at the 56th Sitges Film Festival in October 2023 and had further theatrical engagements over the following year before Grindhouse issued a Blu-ray release in October 2024.

== Plot ==
Mark, a 29-year-old freelance photographer from Indiana, has settled in Los Angeles in pursuit of becoming a cinematographer. Mark is haunted by memories of his overbearing mother and wracked with guilt over having accidentally caused his baby brother's death during his childhood. He finds himself struggling to maintain a career in California, and is relegated to shooting short loops of pornography for Jobal, a fat producer who pays him fairly but won't let him use the cameras to shoot any footage sets on his own (this prevents him from getting a job at a legitimate industrial film company because he has no non-pornographic footage to show a hiring manager). He is also sexually frustrated and responds to sexual interest from women by strangling them to death.

Through his experience shooting pornography, he meets Michele, a pornographic actress with whom he begins to bond with over their Midwestern backgrounds and interest in art. Michele is in a committed relationship with an unseen musician named Paul which Mark respects, and the two maintain a platonic friendship. The two go for a hike on Mount Lee to the Hollywood Sign. Mark confesses his feelings of loneliness and alienation to Michele, and she reciprocates by explaining her childhood love of movies, which drew her to leave her small hometown in Nebraska for California. She narrates her own descent into sex work and eventually pornography, which has left her with feelings of dejection that her relationship hasn't really replaced.

One morning, Mark offers Gretchen, a talkative young hitchhiker, a ride to the beach. The two spend time together there, and rent a boat together. Mark eventually grows infuriated by Gretchen's incessant talking, and strangles her to death before throwing her body into the water. Mark manages to convince the elderly boat proprietor that he dropped Gretchen off up the coastline. Mark returns home where he hears a message from Michele on his answering machine: She confesses that, despite caring for him, she no longer wishes to see him, as she feels he is committed to remaining in a state of unhappiness.

Mark visits Michele at her apartment, and the two seemingly have sex. In the morning, Mark awakens to find that Michele is dead, having been strangled by him the night before. Shortly after, Mark hangs himself from the Hollywood Sign, recording his own suicide with his 16 mm camera.

== Cast ==
- Christopher Augustine as Mark
- Jeannette Dilger as Michele
- Dick Glass as Jobal
- Gayle Davis as Gretchen
- Ralph Campbell as Producer
- Kia Cameron as Carol
- Dianna Huntress as Hippie victim
- Beverly Walker as Karen

== Release ==
Though completed by 1973 and assigned an R-rating by the Motion Picture Association of America, the first known release of the film took place in Los Angeles three years later on August 26, 1976. According to the Academy of Motion Picture Arts and Sciences Library, the cut of the film released at this time ran 90 minutes. The film was reissued in 1978 in an alternate 76-minute cut under the title The Hollywood Hillside Strangler. Other alternate titles include Insanity and Twisted Throats.

A cut version, with a running time of 73 minute 50 seconds, and bearing the title Insanity, was released in the UK on VHS and Betamax by Go Video in November 1982.

=== Remastered ===
Hollywood 90028 never aired on television nor was it given a home media release on VHS or DVD. In 2023, the film was given a 4K remaster from Grindhouse Releasing, and theatrically exhibited at the 56th Sitges Film Festival in October of that year. It went on to screen throughout the United States in May and June 2024, mainly at Alamo Drafthouse cinemas with additional screenings at Portland's Hollywood Theatre, the New Beverly Cinema, and the American Cinematheque.

Grindhouse Releasing gave the film a collector's edition Blu-ray release through their online store limited to 2,000 units, which was released and sold out in October 2024. This edition features an exclusive slipcover bearing the alternate poster artwork for the film under the title The Hollywood Hillside Strangler. A standard collector's edition is scheduled to be released on November 26, 2024.
