= Looner (band) =

LOONER
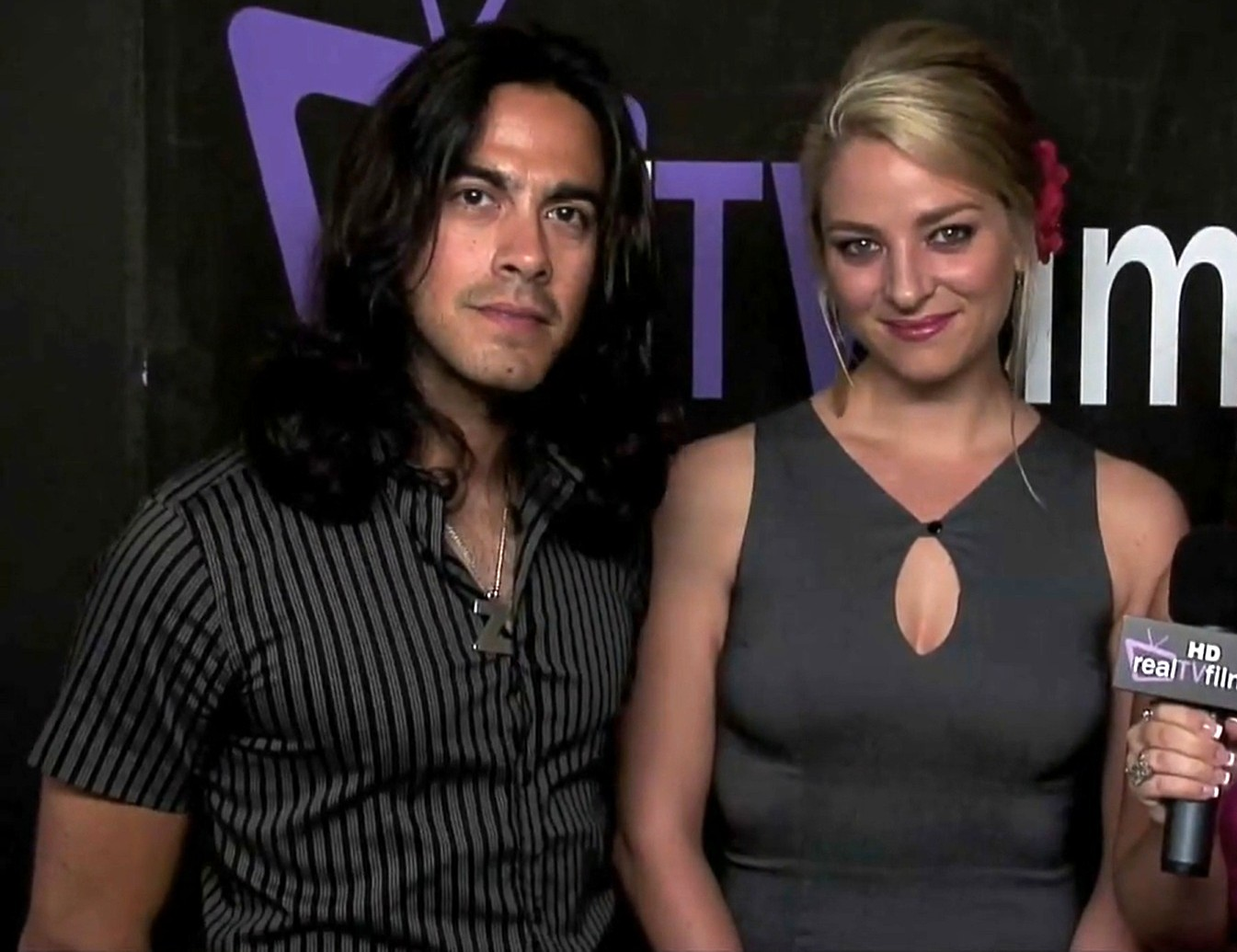
- Left to right: Angel and Zoë Roché in 2009

Background information
- Origin: Los Angeles, California, United States
- Genres: Alternative rock, Pop, Indie, R&B, Rock
- Years active: 2001–present Members; Zoë Roché : Lead Vocals (formerly Zoë Poledouris); Angel Roché Jr. : Loops & Drums; Damon Ramirez : Keyboards
- Labels: Avian Recording Company, Varèse Sarabande
- Website: www.loonertheband.com

Looner is an American indie rock duo formed in 2001 in Los Angeles, California, United States. The band, composed of Angel Roché Jr. and Zoë Roché (formerly Zoë Poledouris), are husband and wife, and classify their music as "Steady Alternative Rock." The group has performed live concert shows and headlined their own United States Tour. Over time, the twosome has also included other musicians for live and recorded sessions. Looner's discography includes singles, EPs, and full-length albums.

== Background ==
The two bandmembers met in 2000 and formed Looner shortly thereafter. Zoë, the daughter of Basil Poledouris, had a song "Into It" featured in the movie Starship Troopers. Angel toured as drummer for Dave Navarro's solo release Trust No One on Capitol Records and has recorded and toured on percussion for Ziggy Marley internationally for over a decade. Angel performs on Ziggy's 2013 Grammy winning album Ziggy Marley: In Concert. In 2009, Damon Ramirez formerly from Island Records 1990s trash funk band Fungo Mungo and Oslo joined the duo on keyboards.

In the summer of 2004, Looner toured with Ziggy Marley as part of the Roots, Rock, Reggae Festival. In 2009, Looner headlined their own US tour in support of their single release "I Love My Tamagotchee!" In 2010, Looner produced the Pain & Joy album for Krister Axel. Ziggy Marley has been a producer of Looner's and co-wrote the single "Home" with Zoë and Angel which was released in early 2014. Angel & Zoë perform the song on Season 3 of the WIGS show Blue. Also in 2014, Magnolia Pictures' animated film The Hero of Color City featured the song "Why Am I So Scared", which was written for the film by Looner.

According to the band's Facebook, to date, Looner has released three EPs, two albums and multiple singles.

== Discography ==
=== Albums, EPs and singles ===
- Follow The Looner, Avian Recording Company (2003)
- Rules, Avian Recording Company (2004)
- The Greatest Weakness, Avian Recording Company (2006)
- "I Love My Tamagotchee" (single), Avian Recording Company (2009)
- "Dutchie" ("Tamagotchee" B-side), Avian Recording Company (2009)
- "Home" (single), Avian Recording Company (2014)
- Why Am I So Scared (soundtrack album), Varèse Sarabande (2014)
- Year Of the Ox, Avian Recording Company (2015)
