= Basil Poledouris =

American composer (1945–2006)

Background information
- Born: Basil Konstantine Poledouris; August 21, 1945; Kansas City, Missouri, U.S.
- Died: November 8, 2006 (aged 61) Los Angeles, California, U.S.
- Genres: Film score, Classical Music
- Occupations: Composer, conductor
- Instruments: Piano, orchestra, synthesizer
- Years active: 1970–2006

Basil Konstantine Poledouris (/ˌpɒlɪˈdɔːrɪs/; August 21, 1945 – November 8, 2006) was an American composer, conductor, and orchestrator of film and television scores, best known for his long-running collaborations with directors Simon Wincer, John Milius and Paul Verhoeven. Among his works are scores for the films Conan the Barbarian (1982), Red Dawn (1984), Iron Eagle (1986), RoboCop (1987), The Hunt for Red October (1990), Free Willy (1993), Starship Troopers (1997) and Les Misérables (1998).

Poledouris won the Primetime Emmy Award for Outstanding Music Composition for a Limited Series, Movie, or Special for his work on the four-part miniseries Lonesome Dove in 1989, and was a four-time recipient of the BMI Film Music Award.

== Life and career ==
Born in Kansas City, Missouri, to Greek immigrant parents from Messenia, he credited two influences with guiding him towards music: the first was composer Miklós Rózsa; the second his own Greek Orthodox heritage. Poledouris was raised in the Church, and he used to sit in services enthralled by the choir's sound. At the age of seven, Poledouris began piano lessons, and after graduation from Garden Grove High School, he enrolled at the University of Southern California to study both filmmaking and music. Several short films to which he contributed are still kept in the university's archives. At USC, Poledouris met movie directors John Milius and Randal Kleiser, with whom he would later collaborate as a music composer. He appeared as a background extra in several episodes of Star Trek: The Original Series. In 1985, Poledouris wrote the music for Paul Verhoeven's Flesh & Blood, establishing a durable collaboration.

Poledouris became renowned for his powerfully epic style of orchestral composition and his intricate thematic designs. He scored the soundtrack for The Blue Lagoon (1980; dir: Kleiser); Conan the Barbarian (1982; dir: Milius); Conan the Destroyer (1984); Red Dawn (1984; dir: Milius), Iron Eagle (1986); RoboCop (1987; dir: Verhoeven); The Hunt for Red October (1990); Quigley Down Under (1990 Simon Wincer); Free Willy (1993) and its first sequel Free Willy 2: The Adventure Home (1995); Starship Troopers (1997; dir: Verhoeven); and For Love of the Game (1999).

Poledouris' studio, "Blowtorch Flats", was located in Venice, California, and was a professional mixing facility specializing in film and media production.

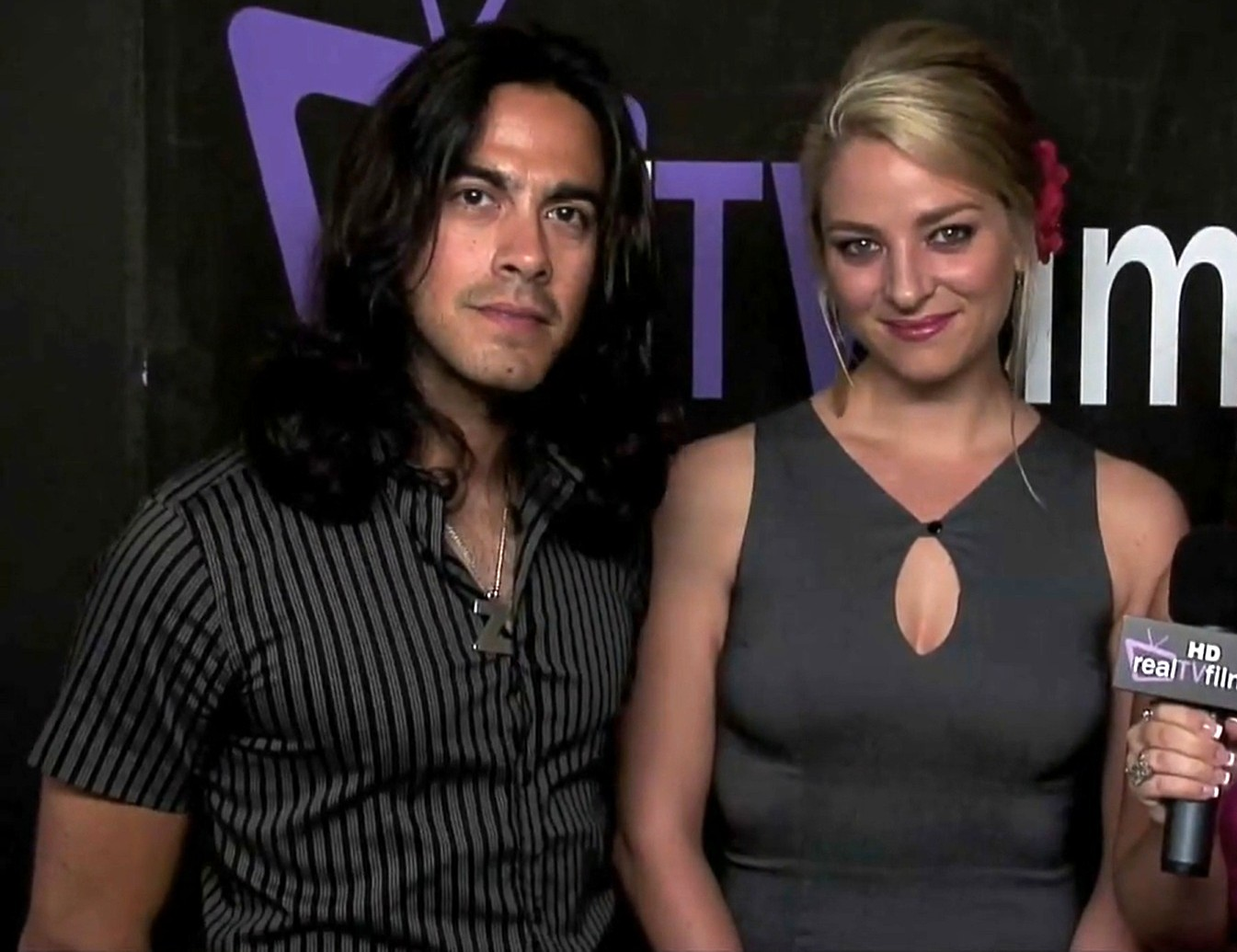
Angel and Zoë Roché, formerly Poledouris, who perform as the band Looner, in 2009

Poledouris married his wife Bobbie in 1969; they had two daughters, Zoë and Alexis. His elder daughter, Zoë Poledouris, is an actress and film composer, who occasionally collaborated with her father in composing film soundtracks.

In 1996, Poledouris composed "The Tradition of the Games" for the Atlanta Olympics opening ceremony that accompanied the memorable dance tribute to the athletes and goddesses of victory of the ancient Greek Olympics using silhouette imagery.

Poledouris spent the last four years of his life residing on Vashon Island, in Washington state. He died on November 8, 2006, in Los Angeles, California, aged 61, from lung cancer.

== Awards and nominations ==
- Winner Best Score for Miniseries – Emmy Awards (Lonesome Dove)
- Nominee Best Score – Saturn Awards (Conan the Barbarian)
- Winner Special Recognition Music Award – BMI Film & TV Awards (Olympic Tribute for "The Tradition of the Games")
- Winner Film Music Award – BMI Awards (Free Willy)
- Winner Film Music Award – BMI Awards (The Hunt for Red October)
- Winner TV Music Award – BMI Awards (Lonesome Dove)
- Winner Film Music Award – BMI Awards (RoboCop)

== Filmography ==
=== Films ===
Year	Title	Director	Studio(s)	Notes
1970	The Reversal of Richard Sun	John Milius	USC School of Cinematic Arts	Student film
1973	Hollywood 90028	Christina Hornisher	Parker National Distribution	
1973	Extreme Close-Up	Jeannot Szwarc	General Cinema Corporation	
1974	Vrooom	Ken Rudolph	Pyramid Films	
1977	Tintorera	René Cardona Jr.	Hemdale Film Corporation; United Film Distribution	
1978	Big Wednesday	John Milius	Warner Bros.	
1980	The Blue Lagoon	Randal Kleiser	Columbia Pictures	
1982	Conan the Barbarian	John Milius	De Laurentiis Entertainment Group; Universal Pictures (North America); 20th Century Fox (International)	Nominated: Saturn Award for Best Music
1982	Summer Lovers	Randal Kleiser	Filmways Pictures	
1984	Making the Grade	Dorian Walker	Cannon Films	
1984	Conan the Destroyer	Richard Fleischer	De Laurentiis Entertainment Group; Universal Pictures	
1984	Red Dawn	John Milius	United Artists; Metro-Goldwyn-Mayer	
1984	Protocol	Herbert Ross	Warner Bros.	
1985	Flesh & Blood	Paul Verhoeven	Orion Pictures	
1986	Iron Eagle	Sidney J. Furie	TriStar Pictures	
1987	RoboCop	Paul Verhoeven	Orion Pictures	Won: BMI Film Music Award
1987	No Man's Land	Peter Werner	Orion Pictures	
1988	Cherry 2000	Steve De Jarnatt	Orion Pictures	
1988	Spellbinder	Janet Greek	Metro-Goldwyn-Mayer	
1988	Split Decisions	David Drury	New Century Entertainment	
1989	Wired	Larry Peerce	Taurus Entertainment	
1989	Farewell to the King	John Milius	Orion Pictures	
1990	The Hunt for Red October	John McTiernan	Paramount Pictures	Won: BMI Film Music Award
1990	Quigley Down Under	Simon Wincer	Pathé; Metro-Goldwyn-Mayer	
1991	Flight of the Intruder	John Milius	Paramount Pictures	
1991	White Fang	Randal Kleiser	Walt Disney Pictures	with Hans Zimmer
1991	Return to the Blue Lagoon	William A. Graham	Columbia Pictures	
1991	Harley Davidson and the Marlboro Man	Simon Wincer	Metro-Goldwyn-Mayer	
1992	Wind	Carroll Ballard	TriStar Pictures	
1993	Hot Shots! Part Deux	Jim Abrahams	20th Century Fox	
1993	Free Willy	Simon Wincer	Le Studio Canal+ Regency Enterprises; Warner Bros. Family Entertainment	Won: BMI Film Music Award
1993	RoboCop 3	Fred Dekker	Orion Pictures	
1994	On Deadly Ground	Steven Seagal	Warner Bros.	
1994	Serial Mom	John Waters	Savoy Pictures	
1994	Lassie	Daniel Petrie	Western Publishing; Paramount Pictures	
1994	Rudyard Kipling's The Jungle Book	Stephen Sommers	Walt Disney Pictures	
1995	Under Siege 2: Dark Territory	Geoff Murphy	Regency Enterprises; Warner Bros.	
1995	Free Willy 2: The Adventure Home	Dwight H. Little	Le Studio Canal+ Regency Enterprises; Warner Bros. Family Entertainment	
1996	It's My Party	Randal Kleiser	United Artists	
1996	Celtic Pride	Tom DeCerchio	Caravan Pictures; Hollywood Pictures	
1996	Amanda	Bobby Roth		
1996	The War at Home	Emilio Estevez	Touchstone Pictures	
1997	Breakdown	Jonathan Mostow	Dino De Laurentiis Company; Paramount Pictures	
1997	Switchback	Jeb Stuart	Rysher Entertainment; Paramount Pictures	
1997	Starship Troopers	Paul Verhoeven	TriStar Pictures (North America); Touchstone Pictures (International)	
1998	Les Misérables	Bille August	Mandalay Entertainment; Columbia Pictures	
1999	Mickey Blue Eyes	Kelly Makin	Castle Rock Entertainment; Warner Bros. (US); Universal Pictures (UK)	
1999	Kimberly	Frederic Golchan	Cinerenta Medienbeteiligungs KG; Ardustry Home Entertainment	
1999	For Love of the Game	Sam Raimi	Renaissance Pictures; Beacon Pictures; Tig Productions; Universal Pictures	
2000	Cecil B. Demented	John Waters	Le Studio Canal+ Artisan Entertainment	
2001	Crocodile Dundee in Los Angeles	Simon Wincer	Paramount Pictures	
2002	The Touch	Peter Pau	Miramax Films	

=== Television ===
Year	Title	Network(s)	Notes
1971	Congratulations, It's a Boy!	ABC	Television film
1981	A Whale for the Killing	ABC	Television film
1981	Fire on the Mountain	NBC	Television film
1984	Amazons	ABC	Television film
1984	Single Bars, Single Women	ABC	Television film
1985	Alfred Hitchcock Presents	NBC	Pilot episode
1985	Misfits of Science	NBC	2 episodes
1985-86	The Twilight Zone	CBS	3 episodes
1987	Prison for Children	CBS	Television film
1987	Amerika	ABC	Miniseries; 7 episodes
1988	Intrigue	CBS	Television film
1989	Lonesome Dove	CBS	Miniseries; 4 episodes Won: Primetime Emmy Award for Outstanding Music Composition for a Limited Series, Movie, or Special
1989-90	Nasty Boys	NBC	13 episodes
1992	Ned Blessing: The True Story of My Life	CBS	Television film
2000	If These Walls Could Talk 2	HBO	Television film
2001	Love and Treason	CBS	Television film
2004	The Legend of Butch & Sundance	NBC	Television film

=== Other works ===
- 1996 Atlanta Olympic Games (Opening Ceremony)
- Conan Sword & Sorcery Spectacular (Universal Studios' live stage show)
- American Journeys (A Circle-Vision 360° film at Disneyland and Magic Kingdom)
- Flyers (IMAX, 1982)
- Behold Hawaii (IMAX, 1983)
