= Brightside (band) =

American band

- Origin: Tallahassee, Florida, United States
- Genres: pop, rock, alternative rock
- Years active: 2014–present
- Members: Jake Long; Connor Holcombe; Dillon Jordan; Will Dunaway; Cory Clark
- Website: officialbrightside.com

Brightside is an American indie-pop band from Tallahassee, Florida. Started in 2014, they have since released two EPs, which have included hit singles "Filthy Bad Habit" and "AEIOU". They have played with Train, We the Kings, Cute is What We Aim For, Theory of a Deadman, Red Jumpsuit Apparatus, Senses Fail, and more.

== Background ==
In 2014 they released their first EP Feels Like Fiction produced by Lee Dyess (Mayday Parade, From First to Last, Go Radio). The band got back in the studio in 2017 with Zack Odom and Kenneth Mount (Mayday Parade, Cartel, All Time Low) and James Paul Wisner (Dashboard Confessional, Paramore, Further Seems Forever) to cut their sophomore EP Heart Science (paid for by fans through a crowdfunding campaign). Lead single "AEIOU" got spins on Tallahassee's Hot 104.9 FM and Brightside has over 300k streams on Spotify.

In 2017 they opened for We The Kings and Cute Is What We Aim For on the WTK10 tour (5 Florida dates) and quickly followed up with two headlining club runs. They have also done several one-off shows throughout Florida with Train (band), Red Jumpsuit Apparatus, Theory of a Deadman, Senses Fail, and more, as well as playing The Vans Warped Tour (Jacksonville) and The Florida Music Festival. The band has played and organized multiple charity events aimed at helping the needy as well as growing the local music scene by giving new bands the opening slots.

== Band members ==
- Connor Holcombe - lead vocals, keys (2014–present)
- Jake Long - lead vocals, rhythm guitar (2014–present)
- Dillon Jordan - lead guitar (2014–present)
- Cory Clark - drums (2014–present)
- Will Dunaway - bass, backing vocals (2014–present)

== Discography ==
Extended plays

- Feels Like Fiction (2014)
- Heart Science (2017)
