= Beethoven's Wig =

- Origin: Los Angeles, California, United States
- Genres: Classical; Children's
- Years active: 2002–present
- Label: Rounder Records
- Website: beethovenswig.com

Beethoven's Wig is an American vocal group that sings lyrics written to classical music. Created by lyricist, lead singer and producer Richard Perlmutter, the group has been a featured performer with numerous symphony orchestras. Beethoven's Wig has recorded five albums.

Each Beethoven's Wig album has received a Grammy Award nomination for Best Musical Album for Children. The group has also received four Parents' Choice Awards, and three of its albums have been named American Library Association Notable Recordings. In total, the series has been honored with 46 national awards. The performing and recording group features singers Elin Carlson, Jonathan Mack, Susan Boyd, Jon Joyce, Jennifer Barnes and Michael Geiger.

== Beethoven's Wig: Sing Along Symphonies: 2002 ==
The group's first album Beethoven's Wig: Sing Along Symphonies was released on Rounder Records in 2002. Prior to that time Perlmutter had released two solo albums, Tin Pan Alley: America's Best Songs For Children and Hot Diggity, and produced albums for the Grammy Award-winning band Nickel Creek and Saturday Night Live cast member Victoria Jackson. Having studied classical guitar, piano and music composition, Perlmutter wanted to write lyrics to classical music. He described his thoughts when he came up with the words "Beethoven's wig is very big", to the tune of the allegro con brio of Beethoven's Fifth Symphony, "The words fit perfectly with the first eight notes of the symphony. And the wig was a perfect symbol for classical music." Within a week of the release of the album, Perlmutter was featured on NPR's All Things Considered, and then appeared on NBC's Today Show. The album shot to #6 on Amazon's Hot 100 Sales Chart and held the #1 position on both the Amazon Classical and Children's Music Sales Charts for four months. Pulse magazine called Beethoven's Wig, "Brilliant, absolutely brilliant!" The Los Angeles Times said it was, "an irreverent approach to music appreciation." U.S. News & World Report said, "Perlmutter's got goofball charm… the lyrics are truly hilarious!" Over the next year, Beethoven's Wig received 15 national awards including a Grammy Nomination for Best Musical Album for Children, and a Parent's Choice Award. It was also designated an American Library Association Notable Recording.

== Beethoven's Wig begins performing: 2004 ==
When Beethoven's Wig 2 was released in 2004, Perlmutter appeared on NPR's Morning Edition, and his two albums took over the #1 and #2 spot on Amazon's Hot 100 Sales Chart simultaneously. While Perlmutter had not originally conceived of Beethoven's Wig as a performing group, the reception that the albums received convinced him to put together a touring group to perform with orchestras. The group featured Elin Carlson, soprano; Susan Boyd, alto; Jonathan Mack, tenor and Jon Joyce, bass. A breakthrough came in May 2006, when Perlmutter and Beethoven's Wig performed to a sold out audience at Meyerhoff Symphony Hall with the Baltimore Symphony Orchestra.

== Concept albums and books 2005 - Present ==
In 2005, Perlmutter released "Beethoven's Wig: Read Along Symphonies," a children's book illustrated by Maria Rosetti. Then in 2006, he released his first concept album, "Beethoven's Wig 3," in which each song featured lyrics set to a classical composition highlighting a different instrument. On the album Perlmutter also began experimenting with the form of a number of classical pieces. He took extremely short excerpts and wrote what were, in essence, little poems set to music. Some, such as an excerpt from Saint-Saëns "Fossils," which highlights the xylophone, were as short as ten seconds. For this work Perlmutter received his third Grammy Nomination.

In 2008, he released “Beethoven's Wig 4: Dance Along Symphonies,” another concept album in which each song featured lyrics for classical pieces written for dances and marches. In this album he expanded the reach of previous Beethoven's Wig albums by including pieces by American composers Scott Joplin and John Philip Sousa. Perlmutter co-produced the album with Michael Geiger, a bass in the Los Angeles Opera, who has also sung on three of the Beethoven's Wig albums. Beethoven's Wig 4 brought Perlmutter his fourth Grammy Nomination.

In 2011, Alfred Music published the first Beethoven's Wig Songbook, a piano/vocal edition of all of the works from the first album.

Also in 2011, Perlmutter released a new album, Beethoven's Wig: Sing Along Piano Classics, featuring his lyrics set to well-known piano works by Beethoven, Chopin, Mozart, Brahms, Schumann, Joplin, Debussy, Mussorgsky, and others. The piano works were all performed by Grant Gershon, Associate Conductor of the Los Angeles Opera and Music Director of the LA Master Chorale. The album was recorded at the Village Recorders in Santa Monica, CA.

In 2012, the songs from Beethoven's Wig: Sing Along Piano Classics were released in an illustrated Beethoven's Wig songbook, published by Alfred Music. The songbook contained piano/vocal sheet music for all the songs, and it included a copy of the original Beethoven's Wig: Sing Along Piano Classics CD. The songbook also featured extensive program notes with histories and anecdotes about each song, which are accompanied by humorous illustrations drawn by Perlmutter's son Sammy, who also did the songbook's cover illustration. In addition, there is a foreword by the author in which Perlmutter shares his thoughts about the process of adding lyrics to works of classical music. And he includes a short history of the practice. In 2012, Alfred Music also published a choral edition of the song Beethoven's Wig designed for choirs.

When Beethoven's Wig: Sing Along Piano Classics was released, the first Beethoven's Wig animated music video "My Little Chicken" (set to "Chopsticks") was produced by Smiley Guy Studios. It features a relentless hen that roams the world pecking and wrecking everything. In 2012, it was followed up with an animated video of the classic Beethoven's Wig song "Beep Beep Beep," with lyrics set to Beethoven's "Moonlight Sonata."

To date, the Beethoven's Wig series has won a record of over 50 National Awards. Perlmutter continues to perform with his group of four Beethoven's Wig singers. Beethoven's Wig is popular not only with symphony orchestras, but also with college and university ensembles. Perlmutter also presents solo shows, singing Beethoven's Wig songs while accompanying himself on piano, classical guitar and mandolin.

In 2025, two more animated music videos by Smiley Guy Studios: "Can You Can Can?" (with lyrics set to Offenbach's "Can Can") and "Sing Verdi Very Loud" (with lyrics set to Verdi's "La Donna è Mobile"), made their YouTube debuts on April 8th. Both of them feature a child-friendly orchestra which consists of a dinosaur with eyelashes (Boyd), a frog with glasses (Carlson), an alien (Mack), a raccoon (Geiger), and a robot (Joyce), with Perlmutter singing along with them.

In 2026, Perlmutter began writing a new collection of YouTube poet videos called "The Gallery of Musical Nonsense". These included instrumentals from the five previous CDs.

== Awards ==
- Grammy Award Nomination: Best Musical Album for Children (2002, 2004, 2006, 2008)
- American Library Association Notable Recording (2003, 2005, 2009, 2012)
- ALA Booklist, Editor's Choice (2002, 2004, 2008)
- Parents’ Choice Award (2003, 2005, 2007, 2009, 2012)
- NAPPA Award (2002, 2004, 2006)
- Oppenheim Toy Portfolio Platinum Award (2003, 2005, 2009)
- Film Advisory Board Award of Excellence (2003)

== Discography ==
- Beethoven's Wig (Rounder Records, 2002)
- Beethoven's Wig 2: More Sing Along Symphonies (Rounder Records, 2004)
- Beethoven's Wig 3: Many More Sing Along Symphonies (Rounder Records, 2006)
- Beethoven's Wig 4: Dance Along Symphonies (Rounder Records, 2008)
- Beethoven's Wig: Sing Along Piano Classics (Beethoven's Wig 2012)
- Before Beethoven's Wig: Sing Along Classics (Beethoven's Wig 2019)

== Books ==
- Beethoven's Wig: Read Along Symphonies (Illustrated by Maria Rosetti, Rounder Books, 2005)
- Beethoven's Wig: Sing Along Symphonies Songbook (Alfred Music Publishing, 2011)
- Beethoven's Wig: Sing Along Piano Classics Songbook & CD (Alfred Music Publishing, 2012)

== Choral Editions ==
- Beethoven's Wig (Alfred Music Publishing, 2012)
