= Ziggy Marley =

Jamaican reggae musician (born 1968)

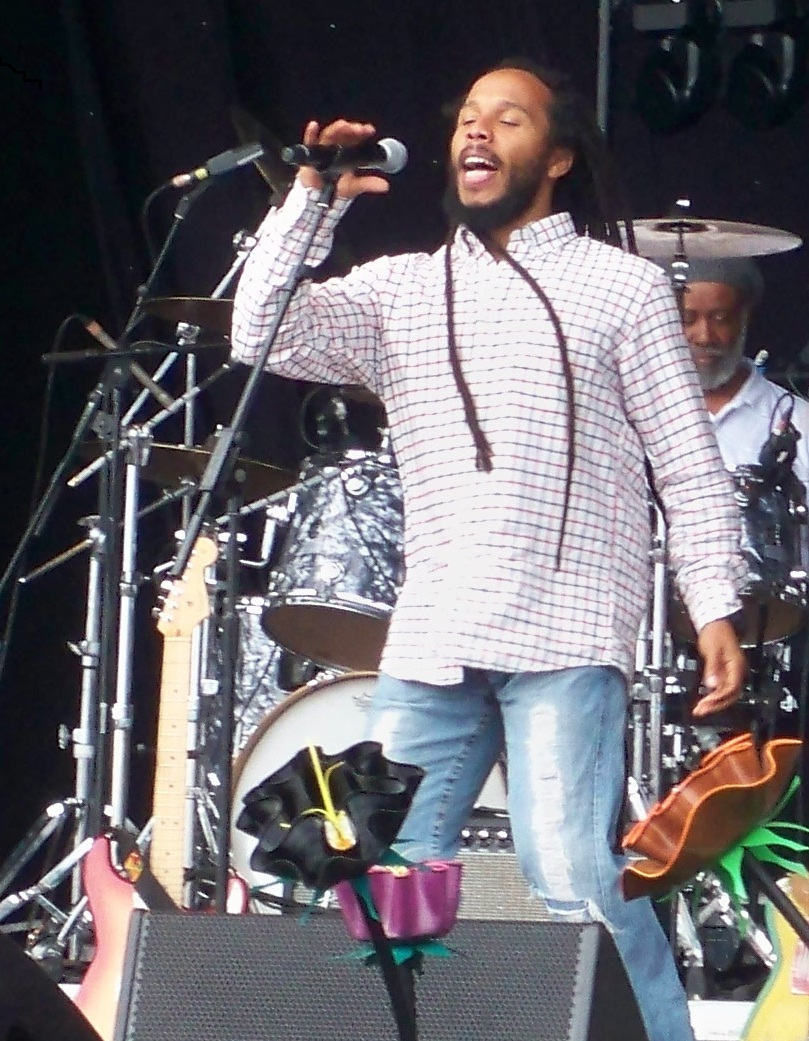
- Marley in 2011
- Born: David Nesta Marley; 17 October 1968 (age 57); Kingston, Jamaica
- Occupations: Singer; musician; songwriter; producer; voice actor
- Years active: 1979–present
- Spouse: Orly Agai
- Children: 7, including Bambaata Marley
- Parent(s): Bob Marley (father); Rita Marley (mother)
- Relatives: Expand list: Sharon Marley (half-sister); Cedella Marley (sister); Stephen Marley (brother); Rohan Marley (half-brother); Julian Marley (half-brother); Ky-Mani Marley (half-brother); Damian Marley (half-brother); Nico Marley (nephew); Cedella Booker (grandmother); Skip Marley (nephew); Jo Mersa Marley (nephew); YG Marley (nephew); Selah Marley (niece); Donisha Prendergast (niece)
- Musical career
- Genres: Reggae
- Instruments: Vocals; guitar; percussion; piano
- Labels: Tuff Gong Worldwide; Virgin; EMI; Elektra
- Formerly of: Ziggy Marley and the Melody Makers
- Website: ziggymarley.com

David Nesta "Ziggy" Marley (born 17 October 1968) is a Jamaican reggae musician, songwriter, producer, author and philanthropist. The eldest son of Bob Marley and Rita Marley, he led the family band Ziggy Marley and the Melody Makers until 2002, releasing eight studio albums, before launching a solo career on his label Tuff Gong Worldwide. He has won eight Grammy Awards and a Daytime Emmy Award.

Beyond recording and touring, Marley is active in philanthropy through the U.R.G.E. (Unlimited Resources Giving Enlightenment) Foundation, which supports education, health and environmental projects for children in Jamaica, Africa and North America.

In 2024 he served as a producer of the biographical film Bob Marley: One Love; the companion compilation Bob Marley: One Love – Music Inspired By The Film (Deluxe) won the 2025 Grammy Award for Best Reggae Album. His recent projects include the children's picture book Pajammin' (24 June 2025), and a North American "Do The Reggae" co-headlining tour with Burning Spear in fall 2025.

Marley also reunited with his brothers for the Marley Brothers' Legacy Tour in 2024, the siblings' first collective tour in two decades, performing their father's catalog in major U.S. cities.

In 2026, he guest starred on the children's television show Yo Gabba Gabbaland in Season 2 and performed the song, "Try Try Try".

== Early life ==
David Nesta Marley was born in Kingston, Jamaica, on 17 October 1968. He is the eldest son of Bob Marley and Rita Marley. His brothers are Stephen Marley, Julian Marley, Ky-Mani Marley, Robert "Robbie" Marley, Rohan Marley, and Damian Marley. His sisters are Sharon Marley, Cedella Marley, Karen Marley, Stephanie Marley, and Serita Stewart. He grew up in Trenchtown, a poor neighborhood of Kingston, and in Wilmington, Delaware, where he attended elementary school for a few years. Ziggy grew up very active, playing soccer and running the mountains, a lifestyle passed on by his parents. As the oldest son of Bob and Rita Marley, Ziggy grew up surrounded by music. He has five half-brothers, one brother, and two sisters. He received guitar and drum lessons from his father and began sitting in on Wailers recording sessions by the age of ten.

== Career ==
=== 1979–1984: Family beginnings ===
In the earliest known record of his musical career, Marley performed as part of a singing group called The Seven Do Bees, made up of him and his classmates, and wherein he was given the stage name "Freddie Dic". The name never stuck, however, and instead, David went on to become known as "Ziggy", a nickname often reported to have been given to him by his father Bob Marley, meaning "little spliff". However, Ziggy stated the following to Melody Maker magazine in 1988: "Me name David but me big Bowie fan. So at the time of the Ziggy Stardust album, me call meself Ziggy and now everyone do."

During the late 1970s, Ziggy could also be seen alongside his brother Stephen at some of their father's larger concerts around Jamaica and abroad. In 1978, the duo appeared on stage at the One Love Peace Concert in Kingston, and the following year at Reggae Sunsplash II in Montego Bay.

=== 1985–2002: Ziggy Marley & The Melody Makers ===
In 1979, Ziggy and his siblings Sharon, Cedella and Stephen formed the Melody Makers (named after the British weekly pop/rock music newspaper, Melody Maker) and made their recording debut with "Children Playing in the Streets". The track was written for them by their father, who had composed the song for them four years earlier. All royalties from the single were pledged to the United Nations, to aid its efforts during the International Year of the Child.

The Melody Makers made their onstage debut as a group on 23 September 1979, performing on the same bill as their father for the first and only time at the "Roots Rock Reggae" two-day concert series in Kingston's National Arena. Ziggy was 11 years old at the time. Notable other early moments in Ziggy's musical history include a performance with Stephen at their father's funeral in 1981, and later that year the Melody Makers released their second single, "What A Plot", under the family's Tuff Gong record label. The Melody Makers recorded an unreleased album titled Children Playing in 1979.

Following Bob Marley's death in 1981, Ziggy began performing in his place alongside the Wailers at various shows around Jamaica, and in 1984 the group went on tour in support of the year's Bob Marley Legend compilation album release. The Melody Makers' first fully released album was Play the Game Right in 1985. Their 1988 album Conscious Party was a major worldwide hit and received a Grammy Award for Best Reggae Album. In 1996, the band performed the theme song "Believe in Yourself" for the animated children's show Arthur. Ziggy Marley and the Melody Makers won three Grammy Awards and five nominations in total before disbanding in 2002.

=== 2003–2006: Dragonfly/Solo Career beginning ===
After the Melody Makers disbanded, Ziggy Marley launched a solo career. His debut solo album, Dragonfly, was released in April 2003. The album featured the single "True To Myself", which remains one of his biggest hits. The track "Rainbow in the Sky" features both Flea and John Frusciante of the Red Hot Chili Peppers, while "Melancholy Mood" features only Flea.

=== 2006–2011: Tuff Gong Worldwide (independent artist) ===
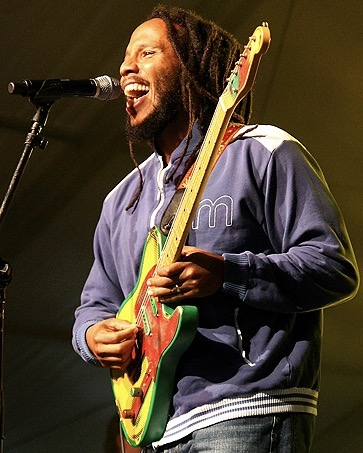
Marley performing in 2007

In July 2006, his second solo album, Love Is My Religion, was released on his independent record label Tuff Gong Worldwide. The album won a Grammy Award for Best Reggae Album, making it Marley's 4th Grammy win.

Marley performed a duet with Donna Summer for her 2008 album Crayons. In May 2009, his third solo album Family Time, was released on Tuff Gong Worldwide. Family Time was presented as a children's album and features family and friends: Rita Marley, Cedella Marley, Judah Marley, Paul Simon, Willie Nelson, Jack Johnson, Toots Hibbert, Laurie Berkner, Elizabeth Mitchell, and more. This album won a Grammy Award for Best Musical Album for Children. In June 2011, Marley released his fourth album Wild and Free. The title track, featuring Woody Harrelson, was available for free with the pre-order of Ziggy's first comic book, Marijuanaman.

=== 2012–present: Two more albums ===
In 2013, Marley's song "I Love You Too" won him a Daytime Emmy Award in the Outstanding Original Song – Children's and Animation category, after it was used in the Cbeebies animation 3rd & Bird. Ziggy released the children's book, I Love You Too, based on the song and illustrated by Agnieszka Jatkowska. In April 2014, Ziggy Marley released his fifth solo studio album, entitled Fly Rasta. Fly Rasta won the Grammy for Best Reggae Album at the 57th Grammy Awards. Marley later announced his sixth solo album Ziggy Marley to be released spring 2016.

In May 2018, Marley released his most recent studio album, Rebellion Rises, through Tuff Gong Worldwide. The album received rave reviews upon release. Cryptic Rock gave the album 5 out of 5 stars, stating "Politically and socially relevant, Rebellion Rises is a war of music, creating peace with a purpose.". Island Stage called the album "a 10-track masterpiece that continues his father's tradition of promoting emancipation from mental slavery through education, social activism, and healthy living." Reggaeville said the album "is not an angry record. It is not a bitter record. But, it is not a record of hope, either. The time of hoping for change is a notion Marley considers past due. This is a record of action, and for Ziggy Marley, the time for action is now."

Ziggy Marley's studio album Brightside, is a therapeutic project focused on mental health, personal struggles, and his family legacy. Recorded in 432 Hz for healing purposes, the album includes "Many Mourn for Bob," the first song he has dedicated to his father, Bob Marley.

== Personal life ==
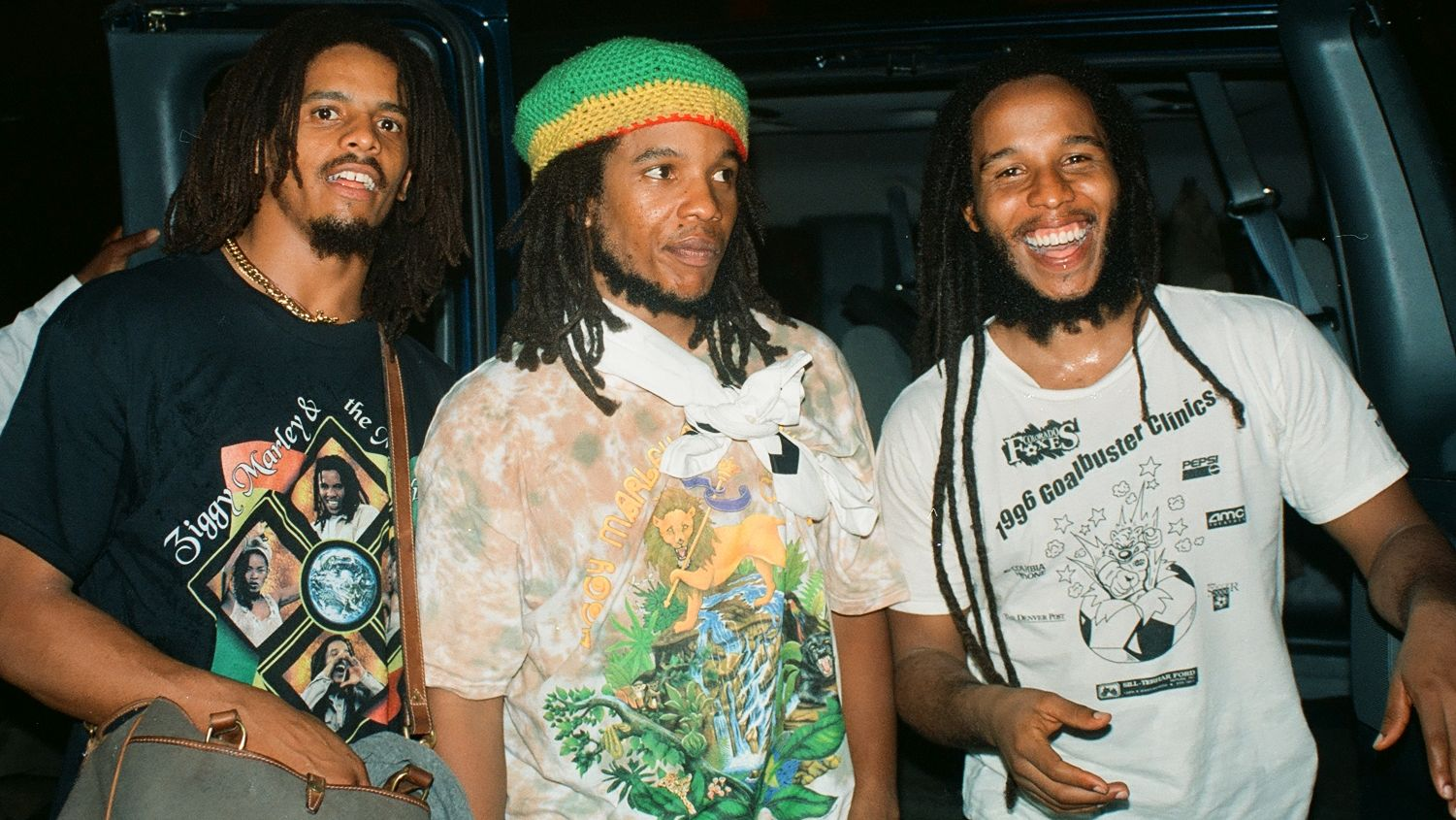
Marley brothers in 1997

He is married to Orly Agai, an Israeli of Iranian-Jewish descent, who is a former vice-president of William Morris Agency. They have four children: one daughter, Judah Victoria, and three sons, Gideon Robert Nesta, Abraham Selassie Robert Nesta, and Isaiah Sion Robert Nesta. He also has three children from previous relationships: a son, Bambaata (b. 1989), a daughter, Justice (b. 1991), and another daughter Zuri (b. 1995). He lives in the Toluca Lake area of Los Angeles.

== Political views ==
In October 2023, just days following the Hamas October 7 attacks, Ziggy Marley, along with other 700 notable Hollywood figures, signed an open letter, written by Creative Community for Peace (CCFP), in support of Israel.

== Philanthropy ==
=== U.R.G.E. Foundation ===
The Unlimited Resources Giving Enlightenment (U.R.G.E.) was founded in 2007 by Ziggy Marley. It is a non-profit, charity foundation working towards improving educational, health and community environments for children.

U.R.G.E acts worldwide, but their main acting areas include Jamaica and Ethiopia, among other African countries. U.R.G.E.'s missions include action and awareness.

Action:

- Seek communities that may benefit from U.R.G.E.'s help
- Raise funds via individual and corporate donations, product sales, ticket sales, and charitable events
- Collect and donate the items (clothing, toys, school supplies, food) that are most needed by children and their communities
- Provide assistance and resources that enable communities to develop and self-sustain

Awareness:

- Raise awareness on current events, social developments and political landscapes which affect children
- Partner with other artists, celebrities, brands and charitable organizations to draw attention to the needs of the communities in need of donations
- Research the most accurate and unbiased information to the media and public
- Share U.R.G.E.'s stories of success through photos, stories and letters

Efforts

- The Chepstow Basic School in Portland, Jamaica has been working with U.R.G.E. since 2008, constantly improving its different areas. Over the years, financial and humanitarian assistance has been aided. Some examples include: financial support for teacher salaries, construction of music rooms and playgrounds, donation of musical instruments and bicycles and the hosting of health and dental clinics. U.R.G.E. frequently posts updates in their website about current and past projects with Chepstow.
- Aided with tuition assistance for the Promise Learning Center, a special education institution in Kingston, Jamaica. It provides academic, technical and social training for children with Autism and other learning disabilities.
- Provided financial aid to Robert Gordon, a top student from Richmond Park Preparatory School in Kingston, Jamaica.
- Donated books and toys to Glenhope Nursery in Kingston, Jamaica. Glenhope Nursery is a shelter for abandoned, abused, neglected, orphaned or disabled babies and toddlers.
- Aided Belvedere Middle School student Kimberly Vargas in participating in the LA Swish basketball program.
- Donated funds for a pacemaker for a surgery in Jamaica.
- Donated equipment (including laryngoscope sets) to the surgical ward and burnt unit at the Bustamante Hospital for Children in Kingston, Jamaica.
- Donated toys to SOS Children's Villages International orphanage in Brazil.
- Sponsored a free dental clinic in Jamaica alongside HealthCare International. Over the span of a week, free checkups and dental care were offered to more than 200 students and local residents. Dental products such as toothbrushes and toothpaste were also given free of charge. Dr. Eli Davidyan was the lead dentist involved in the clinic.
- Marley appeared alongside his family on UGG's Holiday Campaign and donated US$50,000 to U.R.G.E and HOLA.
- Teamed up with Jamaican institutions "BossMom" and "Food for the Poor" (FFTP) to help with BossMom's program "BossMom Builds", which helps build homes for women in Jamaica, providing all the basic necessities such as water, appliances and sustainable energy sources.
- Marley also donates to U.R.G.E. a portion of proceeds from sales and streams of his albums Family Time and More Family Time. He also donates a dollar of every ticket sale he makes to U.R.G.E.

=== Other philanthropic works ===
- Disney included Ziggy Marley and the Melody Makers' song "Give A Little Love" to their 1991 charity album "For Our Children". All the proceeds were donated to the Pediatric AIDS Foundation.
- In 2007, Marley signed on as an official supporter of Little Kids Rock, a nonprofit organization that provides free musical instruments and free lessons to children in public schools throughout the United States. He has visited with children in the program and sits on the organization's board of directors as an honorary member.
- In 2008, Marley joined forces with H&M and other celebrities for the "Fashion Against AIDS" collaboration. This collaboration served as a means to raise awareness about HIV. Marley designed a T-shirt with "Love is my Religion" written on it (the title of his then-latest record), in the traditional Rastafarian colors (green, gold and red).
- In 2011, Marley lent his voice and likeness to the Physicians Committee for Responsible Medicine for a print ad campaign to promote healthy vegetarian living.
- In 2012, Marley recorded a special version of "Personal Revolution" from his 2011 album Wild and Free for the Rotary International "End Polio Now" compilation album. All the proceeds went towards Rotary's campaign to help end Polio. Marley is a collaborator with Rotary to this day, using his social media platforms to help raise awareness about the ongoing efforts to eradicate Polio around the world.
- In 2015, Marley performed a benefit concert for John Varvatos's annual Stuart House fundraiser for the UCLA Rape Treatment Center program. More than US$950,000 was raised during the event.
- In 2017, Marley partnered with the Heart of Los Angeles, a non-profit organization dedicated to giving greater opportunities to the less fortunate youth. He also performed and met with the children at HOLA's 25th Anniversary Celebration.
- In 2019, Marley headlined the L.A. location of the World's Biggest Sleepout at the Hollywood Bowl, an event organized globally by CEO Sleepout UK to combat homelessness and poverty.
- Also in 2019, Marley took part in Kidspace Children's Museum's 2019 Summer Kids Food Festival, aimed to teach children about the benefits of balanced food choices and environmentally-focused eating habits.
- In that same year, Marley was honored by the Creative Community for Peace (CCFP) in their 2nd annual Ambassadors of Peace Gala in Los Angeles. CCFP works to bridge the power of music and bringing people together. In the event, Marley expressed his connection with the Israeli population and spread his message of love and peace.
- Marley was an outspoken advocate for saving the iguanas of the Jamaican Goat Islands, working with the International Iguana Foundation and taking part in a California Science Center exhibit to raise awareness for the cause.
- In 2021, Marley participated in a performance for National Geographic's virtual Earth Day Celebration and discussed climate and environmental issues facing our planet. "We're making art to make a change and challenge the status quo. We need more art like that in this time. We need more music like that. We need more artists like that. So I am just happy that we are using art in that way."
- Also in 2021, Marley recorded an acoustic version of his song "Shalom Salaam" from his 2003 album Dragonfly alongside the Jerusalem Youth Chorus to raise awareness and promote peaceful environments between the Israeli and Palestinian communities. "The chorus empowers youth from East & West Jerusalem with the responsibility to speak and sing their truths as they become leaders in their communities and inspire singers and listeners around the world to work for peace, justice, inclusion, and equality."

== Other works ==
=== Acting and voice-overs ===
Acting and voice-overs
Year	Title	Role	Notes
1990	Parker Lewis Can't Lose	Himself	
1992	Sesame Street	Himself	Episode: 23.70. Melody Makers also made an appearance. Performed "Small People" from their album Jahmekya
1995	Family Matters	Himself	Also performed "Power to Move Ya" from Ziggy Marley & the Melody Makers's album Free Like We Want 2 B
1997	New York Undercover	Himself	Episode: "Is it a Crime?"
2003	Rayman 3: Hoodlum Havoc	Reflux (voice)	Uncredited
2004	Charmed	Musical Guest	Episode: "The Legend of Sleepy Halliwell"
2004	Shark Tale	Ernie (voice)	Also performed a version of "Three Little Birds" by Bob Marley
2005	Club Oscar	Ernie (voice)	
2007	My Gym Partner's a Monkey	Crockadle (voice)	Episode: "Mongoosed/Mellow Fellows"
2009	Sesame Street	Himself	Episode: "Wild Nature Survivor Guy"
2010	3rd & Bird	Himself	Episode: "Jamaica"
2010	Wonder Pets!	The Cheshire Cat (voice)	Episode: "Adventures in Wonderland"
2016	Hawaii Five-0	Bones	Episode: "Ka Pohaku Kihi Pa'a"
2016	Pup Star	Dog Gnarly (voice)	
2017	Pup Star: Better 2Gether	Dog Gnarly (voice)	
2018	Pup Star: World Tour	Dog Gnarly (voice)	
2020	Fraggle Rock: Rock On!	Himself	Episode: "Party Down in Fraggle Rock!"
2021	The Runaway Bunny	Singer	
2023	Spider-Man: Across the Spider-Verse	Lenny (voice)	

=== Musical features ===
Musical features
Year	Artist	Song	Credits
2001	Cheb Mami	Madanite	Producer; Performer
2004	Dora the Explorer	Three Little Birds (feat. Ziggy Marley)	Performer
2007	Angelique Kidjo	Sedjedo	Songwriter; Performer
2008	Donna Summer	Crayons (featuring Ziggy Marley)	Songwriter; Performer
2011	Beatriz Luengo	He Prometido (feat. Ziggy Marley)	Performer
2011	Stephen Marley	The Chapel	Performer
2012	Jack Johnson	Cry Cry Cry	Songwriter; Performer
2013	Cody Simpson	Love	Songwriter; Performer
2013	Andra Day	Coolin' in the Streets (Featuring Ziggy Marley)	Performer
2014	Carlos Santana	Iron Lion Zion (feat. Ziggy Marley)	Performer
2014	Dionne Warwick	Raindrops Keep Falling on My Head	Performer
2016	The Laurie Berkner Band	My My Marisol	Performer
2016	Florida Georgia Line	Life is a Honeymoon	Performer
2017	Morgan Heritage	One Family	Performer
2018	Kenny Chesney	Love for Love City (with Ziggy Marley)	Performer
2019	Renee & Friends	where do the children play?	Performer
2019	Looner	Good Enough	Producer; Performer
2019	Looner	All Women	Producer
2020	Carlos Vives	El Hilo	Songwriter; Performer
2021	Maluma	Tonika (feat. Ziggy Marley)	Songwriter; Performer
2021	Jake Shimabukuro	All You Need is Love	Performer
2021	Natiruts	América Vibra	Songwriter; Performer
2021	Ben Harper & Ziggy Marley	Spin it Faster	Performer
2022	LeAnn Rimes	The Only	Performer
2022	The Marley Brothers	Cornerstone 2022 (feat. Ziggy Marley, Stephen Marley, Damian Marley, Julian Marley & Ky-Mani Marley)	Performer

=== Public appearances ===
Marley and his daughter Judah made an appearance in the 2009 Macy's Thanksgiving Day Parade.

== Discography ==
=== Albums with the Melody Makers ===
- 1985: Play the Game Right
- 1986: Hey World!
- 1988: Conscious Party
- 1989: One Bright Day
- 1991: Jahmekya
- 1993: Joy and Blues
- 1995: Free Like We Want 2 B
- 1997: Fallen Is Babylon
- 1999: The Spirit of Music
- 2000: Ziggy Marley & the Melody Makers Live, Vol. 1

=== Solo albums ===
- 2003: Dragonfly
- 2006: Love Is My Religion
- 2009: Family Time
- 2011: Wild and Free
- 2014: Fly Rasta
- 2016: Ziggy Marley
- 2018: Rebellion Rises
- 2020: More Family Time
- 2026: Brightside

=== Live albums ===
- 2008: Love Is My Religion Live
- 2009: Ziggy Live From Soho
- 2013: Ziggy Marley in Concert
- 2017: We are the People Tour

== Awards ==
=== Grammy Awards ===
Ziggy has won eight awards from fifteen nominations.

Year	Awardee	Category	Result
1982	Reggae Sunsplash '81, A Tribute To Bob Marley	Best Ethnic or Traditional Folk Recording	Nominated
1985	Play the Game Right	Best Reggae Recording	Nominated
1988	Conscious Party	Best Reggae Recording	Won
1989	One Bright Day	Best Reggae Recording	Won
1991	Jahmekya	Best Reggae Album	Nominated
1993	Joy and Blues	Best Reggae Album	Nominated
1995	Free Like We Want 2 B	Best Reggae Album	Nominated
1997	Fallen Is Babylon	Best Reggae Album	Won
2006	Love Is My Religion	Best Reggae Album	Won
2009	Family Time	Best Musical Album for Children	Won
2011	Wild and Free	Best Reggae Album	Nominated
2013	Ziggy Marley in Concert	Best Reggae Album	Won
2014	Fly Rasta	Best Reggae Album	Won
2016	Ziggy Marley (album)	Best Reggae Album	Won
2018	Rebellion Rises	Best Reggae Album	Nominated

=== Other awards and nominations ===
Year	Award	Category
2013	Daytime Emmy Awards	Outstanding Original Song – Children's and Animation – 3rd & Bird (2008) – For song "I Love You Too"
2014	CLIO Awards	"Making of Legend Remixed: The Documentary": Hyundai / UME / Tuff Gong – Brand Collaborations – Integrated Campaign (Bronze); Music partnerships/collaborations for "Making of Three Little Birds Remix" (Shortlist); Documentary Film, Executive Producer
2014	IRAWMA (International Reggae And World Music Awards)	Best Album
2017	UCLA George and Ira Gershwin Award	Lifetime Musical Achievement
2021	IRAWMA (International Reggae And World Music Awards)	2021 Inductee Hall of Fame/ Lifetime Achievement
2021	Medgar Evers College	Honorary Doctorate of Fine Arts
