= Wild and Free =

Studio album by Ziggy Marley
- Released: June 14, 2011
- Recorded: 2010–2011
- Studios: Ocean Way Studios; Barefoot Studios
- Genre: Reggae
- Length: 49:57
- Label: Tuff Gong Worldwide
- Producers: Don Was; Ziggy Marley

Ziggy Marley chronology
Family Time (2009)	Wild and Free (2011)	Fly Rasta (2014)

Wild and Free is the fourth solo studio album by Jamaican musician Ziggy Marley. It was released on June 14, 2011 via Tuff Gong Worldwide. Recording sessions took place at Ocean Way Studios and Barefoot Studios. Production was handled by Don Was and Ziggy Marley himself, with Orly Marley serving as executive producer. It features guest appearances from his eldest son Daniel Marley, Heavy D and Woody Harrelson.

In the United States, the album peaked at number 152 on the Billboard 200, number 26 on the Independent Albums and atop the Reggae Albums charts. At the 54th Annual Grammy Awards, the album was nominated for a Grammy Award for Best Reggae Album, but lost to his younger brother Stephen Marley's Revelation Pt. 1 – The Root of Life.

== Background ==
In an interview with Billboard, Marley stated that the first single will be "Forward to Love" inspired by his wife Orly Marley. Marley concluded by saying, "I don't think I'm going to get enough time this year to really explore this album live", he notes, "so I'm looking for next year for it to be really about this album. I'll probably play this album more extensively live next year than this year, so it's looking like it's gonna be a two-year plan of touring with this one". The album's title track was used for 2010 California Proposition 19 campaign to legalize recreational marijuana.

== Critical reception ==
Professional ratings
Aggregate scores
Source	Rating
Metacritic	70/100
Review scores
Source	Rating
AllMusic	3.5/5 stars
Los Angeles Times	2.5/4 stars
The New Zealand Herald	3.5/5 stars
Slant	3/5 stars

Wild and Free was met with generally favorable reviews from music critics. At Metacritic, which assigns a normalized rating out of 100 to reviews from mainstream publications, the album received an average score of 70 based on four reviews.

AllMusic's David Jeffries wrote: "stoned to the bone with [Don] Was at the controls means this is one of the more humble and cool offerings in the Ziggy Marley catalog, but those are the same reasons it's an album to return to, delivering that satisfying Rastaman vibration whenever listeners crave a mellow mood". Jeff Weiss of the Los Angeles Times have found "Wild and Free is as casual and familiar as a Friday afternoon. You might not remember it in six months, but that doesn't mean that it isn't a pleasant enough way to idle away the time".

In his mixed review for Slant Magazine, Huw Jones stated: "for his latest release, Wild and Free, he rarely feels the need to stray outside this tried and tested outline: each track bounces along with a carefree groove and exudes blissful vibes without really offering anything fresh or innovative, but is there really any new ground to break in a genre that reached its creative zenith over 30 years ago?".

== Track listing ==
All lyrics are written by David Marley, except track 1 written with Woodrow Harrelson, track 3 written with Dwight Myers, and track 4 written with Linda Perry and Daniel Marley; all music is composed by David Marley, except track 4 composed with Linda Perry.

No.	Title	Length
1.	"Wild and Free" (featuring Woody Harrelson)	4:50
2.	"Forward to Love"	3:42
3.	"It" (featuring Heavy D.)	4:37
4.	"Changes" (featuring Daniel Marley)	4:06
5.	"Personal Revolution"	4:54
6.	"Get Out of Town"	4:35
7.	"Roads Less Traveled"	4:02
8.	"Mmmm Mmmm"	3:30
9.	"Welcome to the World"	4:12
10.	"A Sign"	3:20
11.	"Reggae in My Head"	3:54
12.	"Elizabeth"	4:15
Total length:		49:57

== Personnel ==
- David "Ziggy" Marley — vocals, guitars, keyboards, percussion, producer
- Tracy Hazzard — backing vocals
- Takeshi Akimoto — guitars
- Darryl Jones — bass guitar
- James Poyser — keyboards
- Carlton "Santa" Davis — drums
- Rock Deadrick — percussion
- Don Was — producer
- Krish Sharma — recording
- Bob Clearmountain — mixing
- Brandon Duncan — mixing assistant
- Marc "Maka" Moreau — additional engineering
- Stephen Marcussen — mastering
- Orly Marley — executive producer
- Kii Arens — art direction, photography
- Peter Dokus — photography assistant

== Charts ==
Chart (2011)	Peak position
Belgian Heatseekers Albums (Ultratop Flanders)	13
Belgian Heatseekers Albums (Ultratop Wallonia)	1
Dutch Alternative Albums (MegaCharts)	6
French Albums (SNEP)	196
Swiss Albums (Schweizer Hitparade)	83
US Billboard 200	152
US Independent Albums (Billboard)	26
US Reggae Albums (Billboard)	1
