= Fly Rasta =

Studio album by Ziggy Marley
- Released: 15 April 2014
- Recorded: September–November 2013
- Studio: Village Studios (Los Angeles, CA)
- Genre: Reggae; rock; pop; funk; soul
- Length: 35:50
- Label: Tuff Gong Worldwide
- Producer: Ziggy Marley; Dave Cooley (add.)

Ziggy Marley chronology
Wild and Free (2011)	Fly Rasta (2014)	Ziggy Marley (2016)

Singles from Fly Rasta
- 1. "Fly Rasta" Released: 2 April 2014; 2. "Lighthouse" Released: 30 September 2014

Fly Rasta is the fifth solo studio album by Jamaican reggae artist Ziggy Marley. It was released on 15 April 2014, via Tuff Gong Worldwide. Produced by Ziggy Marley himself with Dave Cooley's additional production, it features guest appearances from Cedella Marley, Ian "Beezy" Coleman and U-Roy.

The album debuted at number 129 on the Billboard 200, number 22 on the Independent Albums and atop the Reggae Albums charts in the United States. It won a Grammy Award for Best Reggae Album at the 57th Annual Grammy Awards held on February 8, 2015.

It was supported with singles "Fly Rasta" and "Lighthouse". AOL released a music video for "I Don't Wanna Live on Mars" exclusively on their web-page. The video features his real-life wife and kids in a dream sequence where their family traverses an unhealthy planet Earth. The song and video's imagery convey a unified message from Marley that we should treat the earth well so we do not all have to leave to live on Mars.

== Critical reception ==
Professional ratings
Aggregate scores
Source	Rating
Metacritic	63/100
Review scores
Source	Rating
AllMusic	4/5 stars
Exclaim!	7/10
Now	3/5 Ns
The Guardian	1/5 stars

Fly Rasta was met with generally favourable reviews from music critics. At Metacritic, which assigns a normalized rating out of 100 to reviews from mainstream publications, the album received an average score of 63 based on six reviews.

AllMusic's David Jeffries praised the album, stating: "right-sized, organized in a sensible manner, and an alluring balance of cool and calm, Fly Rasta lives up to its title as it sits on Ziggy's top shelf". Erin MacLeod of Exclaim! found "throughout the record, Marley demonstrates that reggae can grow and adapt without losing sight of its roots".

In his negative review for The Guardian, Jon Dennis wrote: "the only risk Marley takes is on "You're My Yoko", where he attempts to woo a lucky lady by likening her to the avant-garde artist, while casting himself as John Lennon. Julian Lennon would have been nearer the mark".

== Track listing ==
All tracks are written by David Marley, except track 3 written with Sam Martin, and track 10 written with Jacob Luttrell and Geoffrey Early.

No.	Title	Length
1.	"I Don't Wanna Live on Mars"	3:37
2.	"Fly Rasta" (featuring U-Roy)	3:39
3.	"Lighthouse"	4:20
4.	"Sunshine"	3:04
5.	"Moving Forward" (featuring Ian "Beezy" Coleman)	3:14
6.	"You"	3:22
7.	"So Many Rising"	4:07
8.	"I Get Up" (featuring Cedella Marley)	3:38
9.	"You're My Yoko"	2:58
10.	"Give It Away"	3:51
Total length:		35:50

== Personnel ==
- David "Ziggy" Marley – lead vocals, guitar, producer
- Cedella Marley – background vocals, background vocal arrangements
- Ian "Beezy" Coleman – background vocals, guitars
- Sharon Marley – background vocals
- Rica Newell – background vocals
- Tracy Hazzard – background vocals
- Vincent Brantley – background vocals
- Sean Dancy – background vocals
- Tim Fowlles – background vocals
- Rock Deadrick – drums, percussion
- Steve Ferrone – drums
- Brian MacLeod – drums
- James Gadson – drums
- Dave Wilder – bass
- Abraham Laboriel – bass
- Guy Erez – bass
- Paul Stennett – bass
- Zac Rae – keyboards
- Mike Hyde – keyboards
- George Hughes – keyboards
- Dave Palmer – keyboards
- Brian LeBarton – keyboards
- Lyle Workman – guitars
- Takeshi Akimoto – guitars
- Randy Gloss – percussion
- Taku Hirano – taiko drums
- Ronobir Lahiri – sitar
- Todd Simon – horns
- Geoff Gallegoi – horns
- Fabio Santana – horns
- Tracy Wannomae – horns
- Liam McCormick – string arrangements
- Owen Sutter – string arrangements
- Dave Cooley – additional producer, mastering
- Andrew Scheps – mixing
- Isha Erskine – engineering
- Jared Hirshland – additional engineering
- Orly Marley – executive producer
- Neville Garrick – art direction, layout
- Souther Salazar – cover artwork and imagery
- Rory Wilson – layout
- Michelle Rodriguez – production assistant
- Matt Solodky – production manager

== Charts ==
=== Weekly charts ===
Chart (2014)	Peak position
Belgian Albums (Ultratop Flanders)	30
Belgian Albums (Ultratop Wallonia)	120
Dutch Albums (Album Top 100)	64
UK Independent Albums (OCC)	49
US Billboard 200	129
US Independent Albums (Billboard)	22
US Reggae Albums (Billboard)	1

=== Year-end charts ===
Chart (2014)	Position
US Reggae Albums (Billboard)	4
Chart (2015)	Position
US Reggae Albums (Billboard)	15
