= Samsung Brightside =

Mobile phone manufactured by Samsung

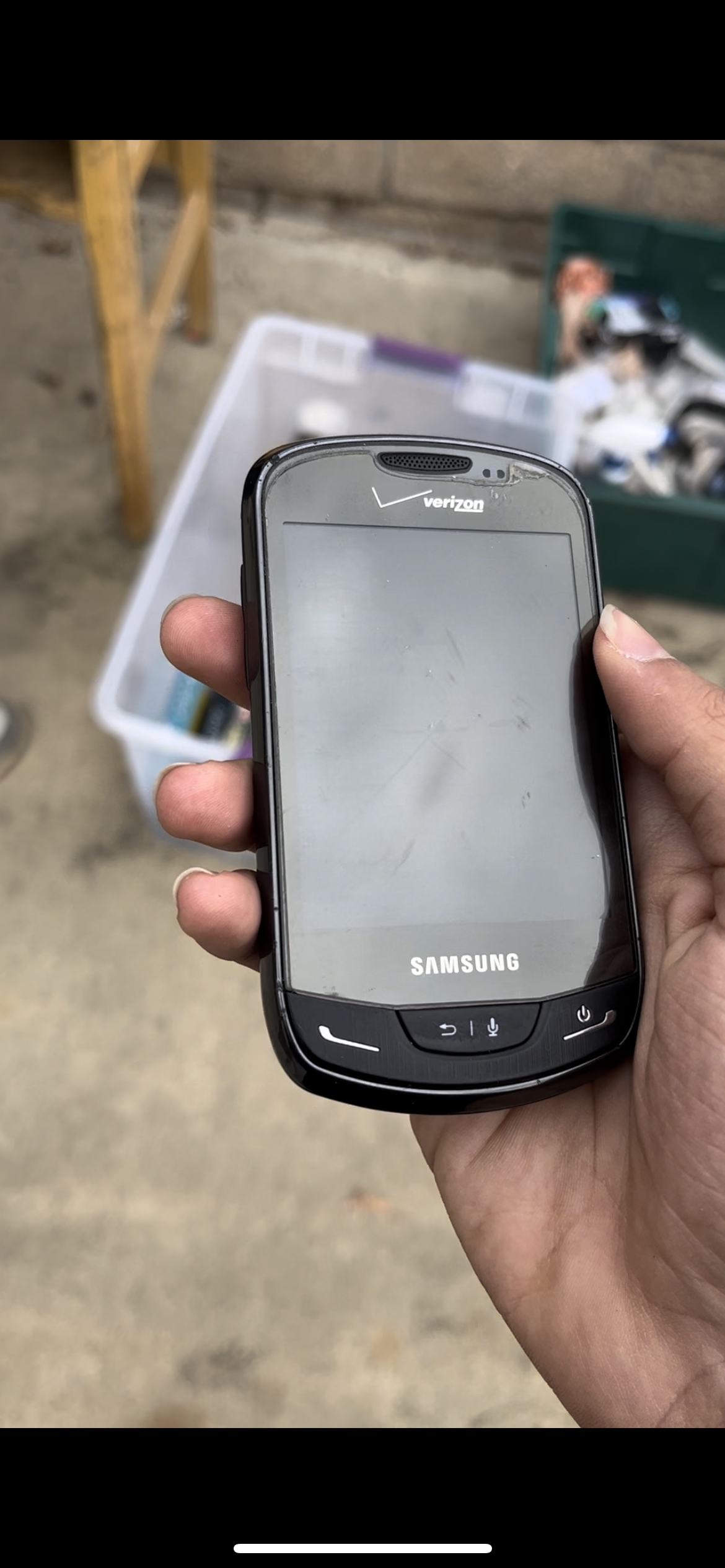

The Samsung U380 Brightside is a touch-screen messaging phone launched March 1, 2012, on Verizon Wireless. It features a 3.1-inch touch-screen display, with a resolution of 320 by 240 pixels, a full slide-out QWERTY keyboard, as well as a 3.2-megapixel camera/camcorder. It runs the operating system Brew MP 1.0.2 (Which makes it a feature phone), it supports MP3 files, and MP4 files (Up to 320×240) It also includes other features like Voice Commands, VZ Navigator, a document viewer, and an Opera Mini web browser for fast Internet browsing. This phone runs on Verizon's 3G network; it doesn't have a physical SIM card: it has a SD card slot, supporting up to 32 GB. This phone comes with a 1,000 mAh battery in the box by default, and it charges/file transfers using the Micro USB port on the bottom of the phone.
