= Ziggy Marley (album) =

Studio album by Ziggy Marley
- Released: 20 May 2016
- Recorded: Los Angeles
- Genre: Reggae, rock, funk, soul, pop
- Length: 45:34
- Label: Tuff Gong Worldwide
- Producer: Ziggy Marley

Ziggy Marley chronology
Fly Rasta (2014)	Ziggy Marley (2016)	Rebellion Rises (2018)

Ziggy Marley is the sixth solo studio album by Jamaican reggae artist Ziggy Marley, released on May 20, 2016, on Ziggy's own label, Tuff Gong Worldwide. The album marked Ziggy's return after 2 years, following the Grammy-winning album Fly Rasta.

The first single, "Weekend's Long", was released on iTunes on February 26, 2016.

== Commercial performance ==
The album debuted at number 99 on the Billboard 200 with 6,000 equivalent album units; it sold 5,000 copies in its first week.

== Track listing ==
1. "Start It Up"
2. "Better Together"
3. "Amen"
4. "Love Is A Rebel"
5. "Weekend's Long"
6. "Heaven Can't Take It" (featuring Stephen Marley)
7. "Ceceil"
8. "I'm Not Made Of Stone"
9. "Marijuanaman"
10. "We Are More (Mi Amore)"
11. "Butterflies"
12. "We Are The People"

== Charts ==
Chart (2016)	Peak position
Belgian Albums (Ultratop Flanders)	124
Belgian Albums (Ultratop Wallonia)	130
Dutch Albums (Album Top 100)	98
US Billboard 200	99
US Independent Albums (Billboard)	10
US Reggae Albums (Billboard)	1
