= More Family Time =

Studio album by Ziggy Marley
- Released: 2020
- Label: Tuff Gong

Ziggy Marley chronology
Rebellion Rises (2018)	More Family Time (2020)

More Family Time is an album by Jamaican musician Ziggy Marley, released in 2020 and featuring numerous special guests including Alanis Morissette, Busta Rhymes, Sheryl Crow, Lisa Loeb, Tom Morello, and Ben Harper.

A portion of the proceeds from More Family Time will be given to Marley's 501(c)3 URGE.

== Production ==
Due to the COVID-19 pandemic in the United States, Marley found himself preoccupied with family issues and homelife which led to writing a follow-up to his 2009 children's album Family Time. Marley recorded the album in his home studio and then reached out to friends to add to the tracks.

The album featured Marley's family and was inspired by many of their activities.

We kind of adapted our lifestyle; we started doing things as a family we wouldn’t normally have done if the kids were in school," he explains. "We made up our own camp games, and did stuff outside, and everything we did at that time, outside of making that album, was part of the creative process.

One song, "My Dog Romero", is about the family dog, a lagotto Romagnolo, adopted shortly before the pandemic began.

== Track listing ==
All songs written and produced by Ziggy Marley, except where noted.

More Family Time – Digital edition
No.	Title	Writer(s)	Length
1.	"Play with Sky" (feat. Ben Harper)		2:33
2.	"Everywhere You Go" (feat. Sheryl Crow)		3:10
3.	"Music Is in Everything" (feat. Lisa Loeb)		3:24
4.	"Move Your Body" (feat. Tom Morello, Busta Rhymes and Isaiah Marley)		3:49
5.	"Jambo" (feat. Angelique Kidjo)	Edebe Kalambay; Russell Robinson; Teddy Kalanda Harrison; Marley	4:19
6.	"Please Excuse Me Thank You" (feat. Alanis Morissette)		2:51
7.	"Garden Song of Miracle" (feat. Stephen Marley)		3:11
8.	"Goo Goo Ga Ga"		3:13
9.	"My Dog Romeo"		2:46
10.	"Wonderful People" (feat. Judah Marley, Gideon Marley & Abraham Marley)		3:47
Total length:			33:06

More Family Time – CD edition
No.	Title	Length
11.	"Today I Feel Silly" (feat. Jamie Lee Curtis reading her kids’ book)

== Reviews ==
Rolling Stone gave the album 3/5 stars and called it "an ideal time filler for parents looking for something/anything to put on the stereo and get your kids shaking out the sillies between bouts of remote learning."
