= Love Is My Religion =

Studio album by Ziggy Marley
- Released: 2 July 2006
- Genre: Reggae
- Length: 47:57
- Labels: Tuff Gong Worldwide, Cooking Vinyl
- Producers: Ziggy Marley; Ross Hogarth

Ziggy Marley chronology
Dragonfly (2003)	Love Is My Religion (2006)	Family Time (2009)

Love Is My Religion is Ziggy Marley's second solo album, the first being Dragonfly, after the 2000 end of Ziggy Marley & The Melody Makers. The album was released on 2 July 2006 by father Bob Marley's label Tuff Gong Worldwide, and carries on his reggae-style pop sound and lyrical themes established in Dragonfly. Love Is My Religion was named the 2007 Best Reggae album for the 49th Grammy awards held in Los Angeles in 2007.

== Track listing ==
1. "Into the Groove"
2. "Love Is My Religion"
3. "Make Some Music"
4. "Friend"
5. "Black Cat"
6. "Beach in Hawaii"
7. "A Lifetime"
8. "Be Free"
9. "Keep on Dreaming"
10. "Still the Storm"
11. "Love Is My Religion" (acoustic)
12. "Be Free" (dub)
13. "Jammin'" (live) (UK bonus track)
14. "Dragonfly" (live) (UK bonus track)
15. "Look Who's Dancing" (live) (UK bonus track)

== Personnel ==
- Takeshi Akimoto – Guitar
- Tommy Barbarella – Fender Rhodes
- Ron Blake – Horn
- Ken Chastain – Percussion
- Luis Conte – Percussion
- Joel Derouin – Violin
- Paul Fakhourie – Bass
- Aaron Fessel – Assistant Engineer
- Lior Goldenberg – Assistant Engineer
- Tracy Hazzard – Background Vocals
- Ross Hogarth – Percussion, Producer, Engineer, Mixing
- Suzie Katayama – Conductor, String Arrangements
- Brian Malouf – Mixing
- Stephen Marley – Guitar
- Ziggy Marley – Organ, Bass, Guitar, Percussion, Piano, Keyboards, Producer, Liner Notes
- Marc Moreau – Guitar, Engineer, Mixing
- Gregory J. Morris – Assistant Engineer
- Natasha Pierce – Background Vocals
- Tim Pierce – Guitar
- David Ralicke – Horn, Saxophone
- Michele Richards – Violin
- Jake Shimabukuro – Ukulele
- Rudolph Stein – Cello
- Tracy Wannomae – Flute, Horn
- Dan Warner – Acoustic Guitar
- Dave Way – Synthesizer, Mixing

== Charts ==
Chart (2007)	Peak position
US Top Reggae Albums (Billboard)	6
