= Dragonfly (Ziggy Marley album) =

Studio album by Ziggy Marley
- Released: April 15, 2003
- Genre: Reggae
- Length: 46:03
- Label: Private Music
- Producers: Ross Hogarth, Scott Litt, Ziggy Marley

Ziggy Marley chronology
Spirit of Music (1999)	Dragonfly (2003)	Love Is My Religion (2006)

Professional ratings
Review scores
Source	Rating
AllMusic	(2/5)

Dragonfly is the first studio album released by Ziggy Marley on April 15, 2003. The track "Rainbow in the Sky" features both Flea and John Frusciante of the Red Hot Chili Peppers, while "Melancholy Mood" features only Flea.

== Track listing ==
All songs written by David Marley.

1. "Dragonfly" – 4:16
2. "True to Myself" – 3:49
3. "I Get Out" – 4:18
4. "Looking" – 3:21
5. "Shalom Salaam" – 5:08
6. "In the Name of God" – 5:38
7. "Rainbow in the Sky" – 3:08 (featuring Steve Jordan John Frusciante and Flea)
8. "Melancholy Mood" – 4:33 (featuring Flea)
9. "Good Old Days" – 4:18
10. "Never Deny You" – 4:06
11. "Don't You Kill Love" – 3:46

== Personnel ==
- Mikey Bennett – vocal arrangement
- Steve Bigas – additional guitars (tracks 3, 6)
- Ron Blake – flugelhorn (track 8), horns (7, 8)
- Richard Bravo – percussion (track 1)
- Jeff Burns – assistant engineer
- Paul Bushnell – bass (tracks 4, 6)
- Mike Butler – assistant engineer, mixing
- Greg Calbi – mastering
- Héctor Castillo – assistant engineer
- Patrick Clifford – A&R
- Leah Coloff – cello (track 10)
- Luis Conte – percussion (tracks 1–4, 6)
- Gary Corbett – Rhodes piano (track 5)
- Tyrone Downie – synthesizer (track 11), piano (9), keyboards (7)
- Steve Ferrone – drums (tracks 10–11)
- Flea – bass (tracks 7, 8)
- John Frusciante – guitar (track 7)
- Neville Garrick – illustrations
- Keith Grant – assistant engineer, mixing assistant
- James Harrah – additional guitars (tracks 2, 6)
- Ross Hogarth – guitar (track 6), producer (tracks 1–4, 6), engineer, mixing
- Rami Jaffee – organ (tracks 2, 4), accordion (4), keyboards (3, 6)
- Steve Jordan – drums (tracks 7–9)
- Chris Kilmore – scratching (track 7)
- Gregor Kitzis – violin (track 10)
- Nick Lane – horns (track 2)
- David Lindley – guitar (tracks 2–4, 6)
- Scott Litt – backing vocals (track 1), producer (5, 7–10), engineer
- Eric Lynn – keyboards (track 3)
- Brian MacLeod – drums (tracks 2, 3, 6)
- Roger Joseph Manning Jr. – piano (track 8)
- Cedella Marley – lead vocals (track 9)
- Daniel Marley – backing vocals (track 11)
- Sharon Marley – backing vocals (tracks 2, 4, 7–10)
- Ziggy Marley – vocals (5, 6, Lead: 1–4, 7–11), organ (10), synthesizer (11), bass (5, 10–11), guitar (1–3, 5, 8–11), drums (4), percussion (9–11), piano (10), producer (All tracks), engineer, mixing
- Reggie McBride – bass (tracks 2, 3)
- Mario J. McNulty – assistant engineer
- Martha Mooke – viola (track 10)
- Marc Moreau – synthesizer (tracks 8–9, 11), guitar (5, 9, 11), percussion (4, 9), drum machine programming (5), engineer, mixing
- Meg Okura – violin (track 10)
- Lon Price – horns (track 2)
- David Ralicke – horns (tracks 7, 8), saxophone (4)
- Robert Reid – assistant engineer
- Angel Roché Jr. – percussion (tracks 7, 8)
- Blues Saraceno – additional guitars (tracks 3, 6)
- Wes Seidman – assistant engineer
- Ivy Skoff – production coordination
- Earl "Chinna" Smith – additional guitars (track 11)
- Greg "Frosty" Smith – horns (track 2)
- Erica Stewart – backing vocals (tracks 2, 4, 7–10)
- Lee Thornburg – horns (track 2)
- Tony Visconti – string arrangements
- Seth Waldman – assistant engineer, mixing assistant
- Dan Warner – lead guitar (track 1)
- Eric Weaver – assistant engineer
- Kevin Westenberg – photography

== Chart performance ==
=== Album ===
Chart	Provider(s)	Peak position	Certification	Sales/ shipments
Billboard 200 (U.S.)	Billboard	138	Not certified	N/A
Billboard Top Reggae Albums (U.S.)	Billboard	3	Not certified	N/A
Billboard Top R&B/Hip-Hop Albums (U.S.)	Billboard	84	Not certified	N/A
