= Family Time (album) =

Studio album by Ziggy Marley
- Released: May 5, 2009
- Genre: Reggae, children's music
- Label: Tuff Gong

Ziggy Marley chronology
Love Is My Religion (2006)	Family Time (2009)	Wild and Free (2011)

Family Time is the third studio album by Jamaican musician Ziggy Marley, released in 2009 through the record label Tuff Gong. In 2010, the album earned Marley the Grammy Award for Best Musical Album for Children. A portion of the album's proceeds were donated to Chepstowe Basic School, Port Antonio, Jamaica. It is led by the single "Walk Tall" featuring Paul Simon.

In 2020, Marley released a follow-up album entitled More Family Time.

== Track listing ==
1. "Family Time" (featuring Judah Marley) - 4:20
2. "I Love You Too" (featuring Rita Marley and Cedella Marley) - 3:34
3. "Cry, Cry, Cry" (featuring Jack Johnson and Paula Fuga) - 4:45
4. "Take Me to Jamaica" (featuring Toots Hibbert) - 3:18
5. "Ziggy Says" - 3:52
6. "This Train" (featuring Willie Nelson) - 3:39
7. "Wings of an Eagle" (featuring Elizabeth Mitchell) - 4:18
8. "ABC" - 4:02
9. "Hold Him Joe" - 3:37
10. "Walk Tall" (featuring Paul Simon) - 3:16
11. "Future Man, Future Lady" (featuring Laurie Berkner) - 3:38
