= Ocasional Talento =

Bolivian rapper (1996–2025)

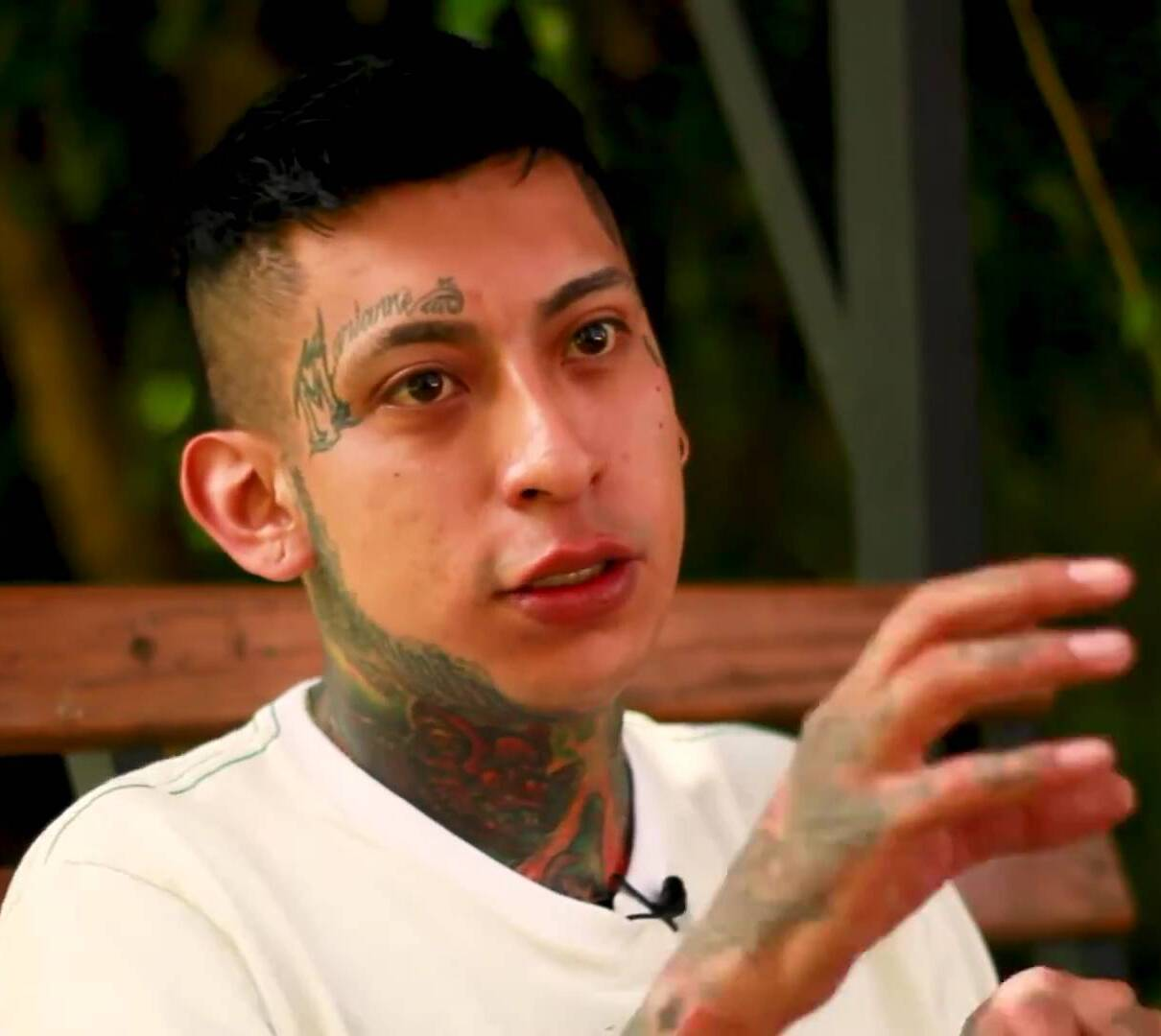
- Ocasional Talento in 2022

Background information
- Also known as: Hiro Ishida
- Born: Hiroshi Claudio Ishida Ruiz; 6 May 1996; La Paz, Bolivia
- Died: 26 June 2025 (aged 29) La Paz, Bolivia
- Genres: Hip hop
- Occupations: Rapper; singer; songwriter; record producer; poet
- Instrument: Vocals
- Years active: 2018–2025

Hiroshi Claudio Ishida Ruiz (6 May 1996 – 26 June 2025), known professionally as Ocasional Talento, was a Bolivian rapper, singer, songwriter, record producer and poet. He was also part of the jazz and hip hop band Vinilo 54, where he played the role of songwriter and lead vocalist.

== Early life ==
Ishida was born in La Paz on 6 May 1996; he was of Japanese descent. From an early age, he was drawn to music and the arts, an interest that began to consolidate during his school years, where music teachers encouraged his vocation from the age of seven. During his adolescence, he practiced skateboarding and parkour, activities that led him to share different musical genres with his environment, from rock and punk to rap. Over time, he became primarily identified with hip hop and boom bap.

== Career ==
=== 2018–2020: Career beginnings ===
At age 19, Ishida began recording his first rap songs in the form of homemade demos, which he shared on his personal Facebook account. During this initial stage, he used the pseudonym "Hi-yakuza", which he later replaced with "Ocasional Talento". After recording over instrumentals extracted from the internet, he decided to professionalize his sound, which led him to meet the French producer Rez-p, with whom he began a sustained collaboration that began with the song Contacto Visual.

The character of Ocasional Talento emerged from a collection of poems Ishida worked on in 2018, the year he discovered hip hop and rap. As he stated in interviews, he chose a pseudonym that functioned as a first and last name, with the intention of creating a distinct identity that would allow him to express aspects that, as Hiro, he did not feel comfortable expressing. He described this alter ego as a figure that appeared intermittently, in episodes of creative inspiration, which is why he chose the term "Occasional," while "Talent" alluded to the artistic capacity that emerged in those moments.

In his early years, Ishida recognized influences from both international artists and some Bolivian groups, despite the fact that a decade ago the local scene was still limited. Among the national influences that sparked his interest were FM11, a band from La Paz, and El Parche, an old-school hip-hop group from Santa Cruz.

During the early stages of his career, Ishida faced skepticism from family and friends, who believed that rap had no economic future in Bolivia. Faced with this perception, he considered joining a cumbia group, a genre in which his brother, Naoki Ishida, was already working. However, he ruled out that possibility, considering that it would mean distancing himself from the Ocasional Talento project and adopting stage dynamics he did not share, such as choreographed dancing.

=== 2021–2025: Breakthrough ===
In November 2021, Talento released his debut album titled "SÓLIDO," which includes eight songs that fuse samples and rhythms with influences of jazz, soul, and funk. Along with the recording of this album, Talento formed the band Vinilo 54, made up of himself, Emilia Lanza, Eduardo Navarre, Bladimir Morales, and Diego Ballón, releasing their first single titled "You and I."

Despite his presence on the scene since 2018, it was in 2022 that Talento's career achieved recognition, earning him a nomination for Best New Artist at the Bolivia Music Awards that year. Thanks to his growing fame, he received an invitation to join the festival's lineup. Respira Vol II, sharing the stage with prominent local artists such as Bonny Lovy, Matamba, and Chila Jatun.

In 2023, Talento received nominations for Best Urban Artist and Best Songwriter at the Bolivia Music Awards. Additionally, that same year, he participated again in the Respira Bolivia event, this being the third edition, where he collaborated with 30 other local artists.

In December 2024, Talento announced through his social media the publication of his first book of poems, entitled "¿Cómo muchos perros te buscan?" (How many dogs are chasing you?). The presentation took place on 21 December in Santa Cruz de la Sierra, at the Street Project facilities.

In early 2025, after several nominations in previous editions, Talento won the award for Best Urban Artist at the Bolivia Music Awards 2024. His last performance took place on 21 June 2025 at the Nuna Espacio Arte theater, where he shared the stage with his band Vinilo 54 and composer Rez-p. Due to his death, he could not fulfill several scheduled performances, including a trip to Sucre scheduled for August and September of that same year.

Besides his musical career, he stood out as a graphic designer by profession.

== Death ==
On 25 June 2025, Ishida made his last social media post, an image with a black background accompanied by the words "thank you." The following day, his younger brother, Naoki Ishida, publicly confirmed his death through a statement released on social media, without providing information about the cause of his death. That same day, the wake was held in La Paz, and the following day a Christian ceremony took place, after which he was buried in the Jardín Cemetery.

Following the confirmation of Ishida's death, several national artists expressed their solidarity and highlighted his influence on the country's music scene. Bonny Lovy praised his talent and mentioned their plans for joint productions, while Luis Vega expressed his admiration and recalled their shared performances.

On 27 June, the Bolivian Special Force to Fight Crime (FELCC), a unit of the Bolivian National Police, reported that Ishida died after falling from the fifth floor of his home in the Villa Fátima area of La Paz. The director of the institution, Gabriel Neme, confirmed that it was a case of violent death and that a suicide note addressed to his daughter was found at the scene. According to initial investigations, authorities indicated that Ishida was experiencing emotional and family difficulties. According to the preliminary report, Ishida arrived home around 1:00 a.m. after consuming alcoholic beverages and had made final contact with his close circle before the incident. He was 29.

Ten weeks after Ishida's death, it was announced that his brother Naoki, a cumbia singer, had died from aspiration pneumonia.

== Discography ==
Credits taken from iTunes.

=== EPs ===
- 2020: SÓLIDO

=== Singles ===
- 2020: El Escritor del Cuento
- 2021: En el medio
- 2021: Un último intento
- 2022: LIMBO (ft. Jotty Roots)
- 2022: Stereo Break
- 2023: Ya (ft. Lu de la Tower)
- 2023: Buen Tipo
- 2023: Todo lo contrario
- 2024: Sold Out
- 2024: La Prima (ft. Los Prana)
- 2024: La Danza del Fuego
- 2025: Cara o Cruz
- 2025: Cara o Cruz (Soul Version)

== Awards and nominations ==
=== Bolivia Music Awards ===
Year	Category	Work	Result	Ref.
2022	Best New Artist	Himself	Nominated	
2023	Best Songwriter	Himself	Nominated	
2023	Best Urban Artist (male)	Himself	Nominated	
2024	Best Urban Artist (male)	Himself	Won	
