= Matamba (singer) =

Bolivian singer-songwriter (born 1986)

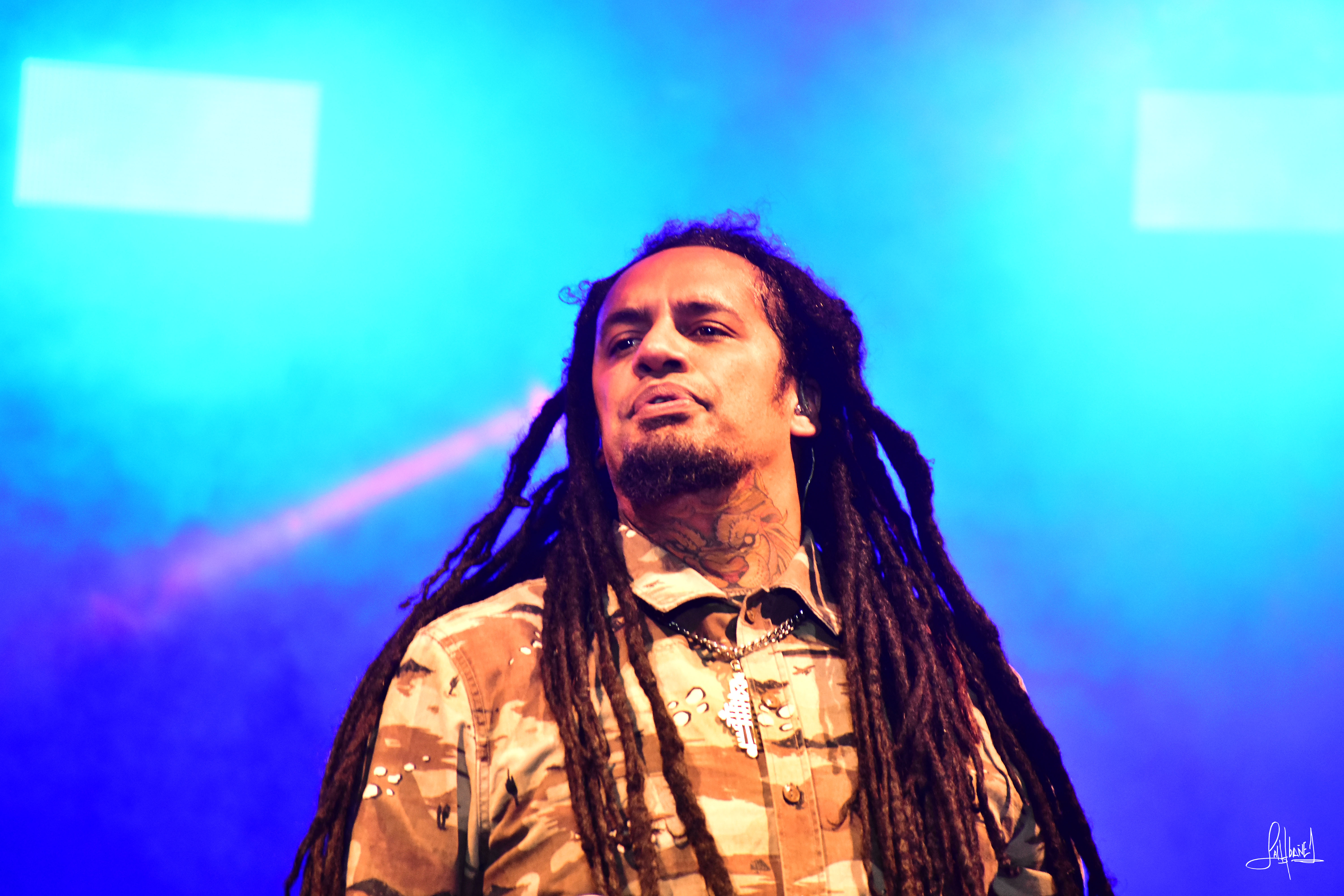
- Matamba in 2022

Background information
- Also known as: Matamba, el mensajero de Lion
- Born: Juan Carlos Chiorino Basurco; 4 February 1986 (age 40); Buenos Aires, Argentina
- Origin: Santa Cruz de la Sierra, Bolivia
- Genres: Reggae; hard rock; ska
- Occupations: Singer; songwriter; record producer
- Instrument: Vocals
- Years active: 1997–present
- Label: Warner Music Argentina (2022-present)

Juan Carlos Chiorino Basurco (born 4 February 1986), known professionally as Matamba, el mensajero de Lion or simply Matamba, is an Argentine-Bolivian singer, songwriter and record producer.

Matamba has developed his career primarily in the reggae genre, consolidating a prominent presence within Bolivian alternative music and participating in tours that span countries such as Mexico, Nicaragua, Argentina, and Chile. His international performances include the Pepsi Music Festival in its 2007 and 2009 editions held in Buenos Aires, as well as the second version of the Reggae Fest in 2010 held in Paraguay and the 9 Mile Music Festival 2017 held in Miami.

Matamba also participated in international productions such as the Tributo Mundial a Los Cadillacs and for the Green Album: Reggae Tribute to The Beatles, where he was selected to reinterpret a song from each band, adapting it to his style.

== Early life ==
Matamba was born in Buenos Aires, into an artistic environment, the son of Argentine producer Carlos Domingo Chiorino Piaggio and Afro-Peruvian singer Carmen Rosa Basurco Aedo. From an early age, he was strongly influenced by his father's compositions and his mother's performances. He arrived in Santa Cruz de la Sierra during his childhood and grew up there, developing a cultural identity linked to Bolivia.

The family initially settled in the San Aurelio neighborhood and later, in 1994, moved to Cotoca. During this period, Matamba forged links with those who would form his first musical band.

== Career ==
=== 1997–2005: Kerux and Contracultura ===
In 1997, Matamba founded the band Kerux (also spelled K-Rux), considered one of the first hardcore bands formed in Santa Cruz de la Sierra. Unlike similar experiences in other countries, Kerux did not originate in an anarcho-punk environment, but rather within a Baptist community, with a Christian focus.

Given the absence of a local hardcore scene, the band began performing in public spaces, which led to the formation of a collective of musicians, skaters, and graffiti artists, which Matamba called "La Raza." Over time, the term also came to identify its followers and the artistic environment that emerged around the project.

Later, Matamba founded the band Contracultura, with which he expanded his influence in the Bolivian alternative rock scene. Formed in 2001, this band was characterized by a more direct and combative message than their previous project, remaining within the hardcore genre. Songs such as "Renacer" and "Cae Bolivia" received airplay on local radio stations, which favored the group's presence on stages in different Latin American countries.

=== 2006–2013: The birth of Matamba and international success ===
Both Kerux and Contracultura incorporated elements of roots reggae into their musical repertoires. This influence is linked to Matamba's Jamaican ancestry, as one of his great-great-grandfathers emigrated from Jamaica to Latin America. From this cultural connection, he developed an interest in combining reggae with metal, which led to the creation of his solo project "Matamba" in 2006. This project introduced his own style that the artist called Dreadcore, a fusion of Rastafarian-inspired reggae (dread) and the hardcore genre.

In 2007, Matamba made his first international performance when he participated in the Pepsi Music Festival in Argentina, which marked the beginning of his projection outside of Bolivia. Two years later, in 2009, he participated again in Pepsi Music 2009, further consolidating his presence on the international music scene.

That same year, Matamba was invited by the PopArt label to participate in the tribute album Vos You Know... How I Was Waiting for You, dedicated to the band Los Fabulosos Cadillacs. In that project, he performed the song "Desapariciones" by Rubén Blades, sharing the stage with artists such as Cultura Profética, Aterciopelados, Cartel de Santa, Los Amigos Invisibles, No Te Va Gustar, and Dr. Krápula.

Likewise, Matamba made his Paraguayan debut at the first edition of the Reggae Fest, held in 2009. During this event, he shared the stage with renowned artists such as Bob Marley's band, The Wailers, and Fidel Nadal. A year later, in the second edition in 2010, he stood out again with another participation in the Reggae Fest, strengthening his presence in the Paraguayan music scene.

On 3 November 2013, Matamba participated in the first edition of the Vorterix Reggae Fest in Argentina, one of the most important reggae festivals which brings together prominent exponents of the genre at national and international level in Mandarine Park. Matamba's presentation was positively received, playing a crucial role in promoting Bolivian reggae on the international music scene.

=== 2014–2020: Concerts and collaborations with the Marley family ===
In 2014, Matamba participated in another collaborative project, this time contributing to the album "Hemp! Reggae Tribute to The Beatles Vol. 2" with his cover of "All My Loving." This album, which included 56 tracks by 47 artists from 16 countries, paid tribute to The Beatles in a reggae-style musical style.

On 4 April 2016, Matamba had the opportunity to share the stage with Ky-Mani Marley, the eleventh son of Bob Marley, during the One Love Festival at the Teatro al Aire Libre in La Paz. The event, organized in tribute to the reggae legend, included a notable performance of "Redemption Song" as a duet between Ky-Mani Marley and Matamba.

In the second half of 2016, Matamba received an invitation from the United States government to participate in the "Fostering Civic Engagement and Social Impact through the Arts" program, which aims to promote social change through the arts. During his stay in the United States, he toured four cities in the country in June and July. In addition, he worked on the release of his third album, which included a collaboration with Ky-Mani Marley.

Thanks to the friendship between Matamba and Ky-Mani, the Marley family invited Matamba to the 24th edition of the 9 Mile Music Festival in 2017, making him the first Latin American to be part of the line-up of this annual event created by Cedella Marley Booker, Bob Marley's mother. This event, recognized as one of the most important reggae events worldwide, included the participation of prominent artists of the genre such as Julian Marley, Capleton, Sizzla, Charly Black and Mavado, who shared the stage with Matamba who presented the best of his albums "Estilo Dread" (2007) and "Buenas Nuevas" (2013).

In the midst of the pandemic, Matamba and the Bolivian band Fiesta Cuetillo participated as guests in the first virtual edition of Cosquín Rock, held on 8 and 9 August 2020. During the event, more than 60 artists offered live performances through the platform designed by the organization.

=== 2021–present ===
After several years of hiatus, in 2021, Matamba resumed his musical activities with a collaboration with Puerto Rican rapper Manny Montes on the song Praise. That same year he participated in the event Respira Vol. 2, along with Guisela Santa Cruz, María Juana, Animal de Ciudad, Luciel Izumi, Javvi Elias and Gaby Ferreyra, among others.

In 2022, together with Bonny Lovy, Matamba signed a contract with Warner Music Latina's subsidiary, Warner Music Argentina, who were to distribute his music from then on and all his previous discography. In addition, he was invited by Marcelo Tinelli to participate as a judge in the 2023 edition of the program Canta conmigo ahora, an Argentine adaptation of the British format All Together Now.

During 2023, Matamba was nominated in multiple categories at the Bolivia Music Awards, including Best Rock Artist, Songwriter of the Year, and the prestigious Male Artist of the Year category. Although he did not win awards in those categories, he received special recognition as an "Emblematic Artist," in recognition of his career and relevance in national music.

In May of that same year, Matamba announced the return of the band Contracultura to the stage after a long period of inactivity. The announcement was made through social media, accompanied by audiovisual material from their past performances. The return took place at the Family Fest event, held at the Estadio Ramón Tahuichi Aguilera in Santa Cruz.

In August 2024, Matamba participated in the Gospel Festival in Bogotá, Colombia, one of the leading gospel music gatherings in Latin America. The event, held under the theme "Water of Life," combined artistic performances with messages about environmental awareness and water resource conservation. During his performance, Matamba performed part of his repertoire before more than 40,000 attendees.

== Personal life ==
On 10 March 2022, Matamba publicly denounced an incident of discrimination at the Brasargent restaurant in Santa Cruz de la Sierra, after being expelled for wearing a sleeveless sports garment during a family celebration. The establishment's staff offered him a shirt from the restaurant to access the salad bar, citing hygiene standards and respect for other customers. When he refused, he was asked to leave the premises, a situation that he broadcast live on social media.

The incident generated public attention and statements from authorities such as Minister Eduardo del Castillo, who requested the intervention of the Vice Ministry of Decolonization. The following day, Matamba filed a formal complaint for racism and discrimination. As a result, the restaurant was fined 10,000 UFV (approximately Bs 23,000), according to the Vice Ministry for the Defense of User and Consumer Rights. Later, the restaurant owner offered a public apology, which was accepted by the artist.

== Discography ==
Credits taken from iTunes.

=== Studio albums ===
- 2007: Estilo Dread
- 2013: Buenas Nuevas
- 2018: Lion Army
- 2021: Matamba Lion Army

=== Collaboration albums ===
- 2009: Tributo A Los Fabulosos Cadillacs
- 2013: Hemp! A Reggae Tribute to The Beatles, Vol. II

=== Singles ===
==== Solo ====
- 2011: Desapariciones (LFC)
- 2013: Más fuerte que el dolor
- 2017: Háblame de ti
- 2019: Abrazándome
- 2019: Que no me pierda
- 2019: Patria
- 2019: El Bolero
- 2020: Viva Santa Cruz
- 2021: The Scientist
- 2021: Nattyvidad
- 2021: Tenía tanto para darte
- 2022: Ciudadano
- 2022: La profecia del "10"
- 2023: Portal de luz
- 2023: Santo eres
- 2024: No woman, no cry (Ya no llores más)
- 2024: Awakening

==== With Contracultura ====
- 2023: Cristo va a venir
- 2024: La rebelión
- 2024: Pagarás con dolor (No podrás escapar)

=== Collaborations ===
- 2005 - Taquirari pa' ti, with Mimi Arakaki
- 2007 - Tierra de colores, with Animal de Ciudad
- 2013 - Esfuerzate, with De La Fe
- 2013 - Si tu no estás junto a mi, with Dany Deglein
- 2016 - Firme y adelante, with Radikal People
- 2019 - Justo a tiempo, with Pablo Betancourth
- 2019 - Representando al rey, with De La Fe, Manny Montes and Radikal People
- 2021 - Praise, with Manny Montes
- 2022 - Unidos, with Fabian Liendo, Klan Destino, Las Sandalias, Mesías Reggae, Nengo Vieira, Proclamazion and Radikal People
- 2022 - Honor, with A.N.I.M.A.L. and Lucybell
- 2022 - Te quiero amor, with Chila Jatun
- 2024 - Él te espera, with Año Cero
- 2024 - Tamo junto, with Jah Live
- 2025 - Corrida de Rato, with Machete Bomb, Thestrow and Alienação Afrofuturista

== Awards and nominations ==
=== Bolivia Music Awards ===
Year	Category	Work	Result	Ref.
2021	Male Artist of the Year	Himself	Nominated	
2022	Best Urban Artist (male)	Himself	Nominated	
2022	Best Collaboration	Te quiero amor	Won	
2023	Composer of the Year	Himself	Nominated	
2023	Best Rock Artist	Himself	Nominated	
2023	Emblematic Artist of the Year	Himself	Won	
2023	Male Artist of the Year	Himself	Nominated	
2024	Best Urban Artist (male)	Himself	Nominated	
2024	Singer-songwriter of the Year	Himself	Nominated	
2024	Re-release of the Year	No Woman, No Cry	Nominated	

=== Premios Maya ===
Year	Category	Work	Result	Ref.
2017	Best Alternative Music Artist	Himself	Won	
2021	Special Recognition - Artistic Contribution	Himself	Nominated	
