= Viudita Moderna =

Bolivian singer (born 2000)

- Born: Camila Alejandra Vargas Arteaga; 22 January 2000 (age 26); Camiri, Santa Cruz, Bolivia
- Genres: Latin trap; Latin hip hop
- Occupations: Rapper; singer; songwriter
- Instrument: Vocals
- Years active: 2017–present

Camila Alejandra Vargas Arteaga (born 22 January 2000), known professionally as Viudita Moderna, is a Bolivian rapper, singer and songwriter. Her music encompasses diverse genres, ranging from trap to blues, reggaeton, cumbia, rap, boleros, and trash.

== Career ==
Moderna developed her musical talent at age 7 in the evangelical churches she frequented with her grandmother. Later, she explored the world of music through the radio, learning and imitating songs, which allowed her to discover the capabilities of her voice. After studying law in Sucre, she actively participated in cultural events, joining the university choir. At age 19, she returned to Santa Cruz de la Sierra, abandoning her legal studies to dedicate herself professionally to music. She began performing blues in buses and public squares, later exploring genres such as urban music, trap, reggaeton, and soul, delving into beats and recording.

During her adolescence, Moderna began to adopt a gothic style, characterized by the predominant use of black in her clothing and makeup. On one occasion, while walking through the Plaza 24 de Septiembre, a street comedian compared her to the popular figure of the "little widow," a character present in the collective imagination of Santa Cruz, exclaiming humorously: "A modern little widow!" The expression provoked laughter among those present and, after reflecting on it, she decided to adopt the nickname "Viudita Moderna", which she later adopted as her stage name.

At age 21, Moderna collaborated with Vaccix on the release of "Ay Ay Ay," a song that reached 75,000 views on YouTube in just one week. Although the song was initially intended to be performed by Corona, Moderna became the main collaborator.

In honor of Bolivian Women's Day, on 9 October 2021, the Music Festival with M for Woman was held at the Meraki Theater in Santa Cruz, where the participation of Viudita Moderna stood out, along with other talents such as Las Majas, Vaccix, Lu de la Tower and Mariana Massiel, with the purpose of making female talent visible in the music industry.

In 2023, Moderna achieved a milestone by debuting at the third edition of the Respira Bolivia festival, sharing the stage with prominent artists from the country. Later, in November, she had a prominent participation in the Bolivia Music Awards, where she received several awards and won in the Best Reissue category for her reinterpretation of "La Gata Bajo la Lluvia" by Mexican singer Rocío Dúrcal. She was also nominated in the Urban Artist of the Year and Best Collaboration categories for her song "Cacería".

In 2024, Moderna collaborated with singer Gerónimo Sims on the song "Lágrimas," a piece inspired by traditional genres such as bolero and tango, with elements of Andean music . The music video was filmed in the Chiquitanía region as part of a visual and sonic project that sought to reflect Bolivia's cultural diversity. The collaboration arose from an initiative by producer Lacho and was noted for its narrative approach to themes of heartbreak.

== Discography ==
Credits taken from iTunes.

=== Singles ===
- 2020: Encamoutau
- 2021: Dime que me quieres
- 2021: Más de mi
- 2021: Touch Me
- 2021: Touch Me (VIP)
- 2021: Ay, ay, ay (ft. Vaccix)
- 2022: Plata (ft. Whitehouse)
- 2022: Shining (ft. Ano7her & Lacho)
- 2023: La gata bajo la lluvia
- 2023: Tiger
- 2023: Cacería (ft. Yetsy & Grecia Gon)
- 2023: So Session 5
- 2024: TAC TAC
- 2024: Lagrimas (ft. Gerónimo Sims)
- 2024: Modo asesina (ft. Vaccix)
- 2025: First time (ft. Ledaye Music)

== Awards and nominations ==
=== Bolivia Music Awards ===
Year	Category	Work	Result	Ref.
2021	Best New Artist	Herself	Nominated	
2023	Re-release of the Year	La Gata Bajo la Lluvia	Won	
2023	Best Collaboration	Cacería	Nominated	
2023	Best International Collaboration	Itachi	Nominated	
2023	Best Urban Artist (female)	Herself	Nominated	
2024	Best Collaboration	Lágrimas	Nominated	
