= Mariana Massiel =

Bolivian singer (born 1998)

- Born: Mariana Massiel Pinto Cruz; 14 February 1998 (age 27); Santa Cruz de la Sierra, Bolivia
- Genres: Latin pop
- Occupations: Singer; songwriter
- Instrument: Vocals
- Years active: 2018–present

Mariana Massiel Pinto Cruz (born 14 February 1998) is a Bolivian singer-songwriter and sound engineer whose music is distinguished by its fusion of elements of local tradition with a modern approach, which has led her to stand out as a prominent figure in her country's contemporary music scene.

Influenced by the rich musical heritage of Santa Cruz, Mariana seeks to reflect the cultural identity of her region without neglecting her roots. Her style reflects a deep inspiration from prominent figures in the Bolivian musical scene, including its main representative and great exponent, Gladys Moreno.

== Early life and education ==
From an early age, Massiel showed an interest in music, influenced by a family environment linked to the arts. She began her career sharing versions of songs on social networks, which allowed her to explore her affinity with acting and, later, with composition. In parallel with her artistic development, she studied sound engineering at the Universidad Técnica Privada Cosmos (UNITEPC) in Santa Cruz, where she graduated as the first woman to obtain that degree in her city.

== Career ==
In February 2021, Massiel released the song "22", an autobiographical composition in which she reflects on her creative process, the emotions that accompany it, and her personal motivations. The title alludes to the age she was at the time of its release and, according to her statements, it functioned as a cover letter to formally begin her musical career. The lyrics explore the link between writing and musical vocation, rescuing the desire to sing since adolescence without depending on large stages to validate her career.

Months later, in September 2021, Massiel released the single "Lunita Camba", a song that fuses contemporary elements with subtle references to traditional Santa Cruz music. Inspired by the eponymous song by Percy Ávila, immortalized by the unforgettable Gladys Moreno, the lyrics of Lunita Camba allude to iconic characters and prominent parts of Santa Cruz culture, thus highlighting the cultural and historical richness of the region through a rap with bolero airs.

The following month, on 9 October 2021, in commemoration of Bolivian Women's Day, the Music Festival with M for Women was held at the Meraki Theater, a musical celebration that stood out for the participation of Massiel, as well as other artists such as Las Majas, Lu de la Tower, Vaccix and Viudita Moderna.

In the second quarter of 2022, Massiel released the song "El día llegar" (The Day Will Arrive), a work inspired by both her personal story and that of other emerging Bolivian musicians pursuing their dream of achieving success in the music industry. This composition, which fuses elements of rap and ballad, is a joint creation of Massiel and Gustavo Pinto.

== Discography ==
Credits taken from iTunes.

=== Singles ===
- 2018: Lies
- 2019: No miro atrás
- 2021: 22
- 2021: Lunita Camba
- 2022: El día llegará
- 2023: Imagina
- 2023: Despedida
- 2023: El amor es para siempre (with Claudia Arce)
- 2023: Diciembre
- 2024: Tímida
- 2024: El negocito
- 2025: Protagonista

== Awards and nominations ==
=== Bolivia Music Awards ===
Year	Category	Work	Result	Ref.
2022	Female Breakthrough Artist	Herself	Nominated	
2023	Best Pop Artist	Herself	Nominated	
2024	Best Pop Artist	Herself	Nominated	
