= Joseca =

Bolivian singer-songwriter (born 1992)

- Born: José Carlos Ardaya; 4 December 1992 (age 32); Santa Cruz de la Sierra, Bolivia
- Genres: Cumbia; reggaeton
- Occupations: Singer; songwriter
- Instrument: Vocals

José Carlos Ardaya (born 4 December 1992), known professionally as Joseca, is a Bolivian singer and songwriter. With over a decade of experience, he has consolidated his presence in the Bolivian music scene with a series of hits, both as a solo artist and in collaborations with artists such as Duende, Andrés Barba, Magomán, and Andy Aguilera, among others.

== Career ==
Joseca began his musical career performing in bars and private parties, spaces where he consolidated his stage presence and explored various genres that combine elements of tropical music with urban styles, reflecting his adaptability and artistic evolution.

Joseca developed his career alternating original compositions with reinterpretations of songs by renowned Latin American artists. His reissues include versions of songs by the Ecuadorian group Tranzas, as well as adaptations of works by Alejandro Sanz, Julión Álvarez, and Axel, integrated into his musical proposal as part of an approach that combines authorship with homage to pop and romantic ballad icons.

In June 2021, Joseca and fellow Santa Cruz artist Viwenn released the single "Insomnio," a collaboration with an urban cumbia rhythm promoted by the Imperio Music Group label. The musical production was led by producer Hue, while the release included a music video starring fitness model Claudia Cantero.

At the 2022 edition of the Bolivia Music Awards, Joseca was nominated in the Male Artist of the Year category and received the award for Re-release of the Year for his performance of a hit song by the Ecuadorian band Tranzas, where he brought together fragments of several of the group's iconic songs into a single piece.

The music video "Ni un segundo" marked the A collaboration between Joseca and the group Duende in 2023, combining the former's cumbia style with a composition written by Morgan, Duende's vocalist. Originally conceived as reggaeton, the song was adapted to the cumbia style by Joseca and included in his album.

In March 2025, Joseca made his professional reunion with Luis Vega official, marking the end of a period of estrangement that began in 2023. As part of this reconciliation, both artists confirmed a joint collaboration. A month later, on 10 April, they released the single "Basura", which fused Joseca's signature "Modo Cumbia" style with Vega's "Puro Papel y Lápiz" approach.

== Personal life ==
Joseca is the father of two children with his wife, María José Paz. Their daughter, Valentina, was born in 2019, while their son, Santiago, was born on 3 June 2024.

Since 2021, Joseca has developed music-related charitable initiatives in healthcare settings, such as acoustic performances for patients undergoing treatment, with the goal of providing emotional support through art.

Among his personal interests, Joseca has expressed an affinity for video games, a theme also reflected in the tattoos he wears on his body. He has identified this hobby as a way to channel his leisure time positively, in contrast to other influences from his social environment.

== Discography ==
Credits taken from iTunes.

=== Live albums ===
- 2020: Live Session "Casa de la Cultura"
- 2021: Unplugged (Casa Grande)
- 2024: Live Samaipata

=== Singles ===
- 2018: La medicina (ft. Majelo y On Ryo)
- 2018: Última Oportunidad (ft. Majelo)
- 2019: Mejor Solo
- 2019: Periódico de ayer
- 2020: Ese loco soy yo
- 2020: Ni un segundo
- 2020: Día tras día (ft. Santiago Lorca)
- 2021: Secretos (ft. Andres Barba)
- 2021: Insomnio (ft. Viwenn)
- 2022: Eng. Tranzas
- 2022: Yo no te olvido
- 2022: Eng. Alejandro Sanz
- 2023: No me acostumbro
- 2023: Ni un segundo (ft. Duende)
- 2024: Enganchado Axel
- 2025: Te hubiera dado mi vida (ft. Super Auto)
- 2025: Basura (ft. Luis Vega)

== Awards and nominations ==
=== Bolivia Music Awards ===
Year	Category	Work	Result	Ref.
2022	Re-release of the Year	Enganchado Tranzas	Won	
2022	Male Artist of the Year	Himself	Nominated	
2023	Re-release of the Year	Enganchado Alejandro Sanz	Nominated	
2023	Best International Collaboration	No sé olvidarte	Nominated	
2023	Male Artist of the Year	Himself	Nominated	
2024	Re-release of the Year	Enganchado Axel	Nominated	
