= Alwa Bolivia =

Bolivian rapper (born 1996)

- Also known as: Alwa
- Born: Alwa Conrado Yujra; 15 March 1996 (age 30); El Alto, Bolivia
- Genres: Latin hip hop
- Occupations: Rapper; songwriter
- Instrument: Vocals
- Years active: 2022–present

Alwa Conrado Yujra (born 15 March 1996), known professionally as Alwa Bolivia or simply Alwa (lit. 'dawn' in Aymara), is a Bolivian rapper and songwriter, recognized as Bolivia's first pollera woman (cholita) rapper. Her work incorporates references to cultural identity, social conflict, and justice, especially in relation to the post-election events of 2019, although she avoids partisan political stances.

Alwa's artistic identity is linked to her Indigenous roots. Although she is not a native Aymara speaker, she has an inherited relationship with the language through her maternal family and has expressed interest in developing musical productions in that language. Her work seeks to highlight indigenous origins as a common element in different regions of the country.

== Early life ==
Alwa grew up in the Ciudad Satélite area of El Alto, where she began listening to rap at the age of 14, influenced by her neighborhood environment. For years, she kept her musical interest to herself.

A student of advertising and marketing, Alwa combines her academic career with her artistic development. She identifies with the traditional pollera dress, which has been part of her public image since the beginning of her musical career. As she has stated, she did not grow up wearing it in her daily life, but adopted the garment as a conscious decision linked to respect for her Aymara roots and her artistic proposal. Her foray into the genre, historically dominated by men, responds to a search for representation from her El Alto reality, without an explicit affiliation with feminism.

== Career ==
Alwa began writing her lyrics around 2019, but it was during the COVID-19 quarantine that she decided to dedicate herself more consistently to rap, betting on developing her artistic proposal based on her own writing and interpretation. From then on, she began performing in public spaces in El Alto, where she performed rhymes in Aymara dressed in a skirt, attracting the attention of passersby. One of those recordings was shared on social networks and achieved wide dissemination, which boosted the beginning of her artistic projection. In that "underground" circuit she met José Gabriel Mamani, who was interested in her proposal and offered to produce a video clip. Initially, Alwa conceived this production as a test to evaluate the reception of her work, without anticipating the reach it would have on digital platforms.

As a result, in March 2022, she made her formal musical debut with the video clip "Principio sin fin", a short production that circulated widely on digital platforms and consolidated her presence nationwide. The instrumental was provided by a musician from Cochabamba, and the audiovisual production was completed thanks to a producer who offered his collaboration for free. The video clip was recorded in the city of El Alto, specifically in the 16 de Julio market and at the foot of Chacaltaya, locations chosen for their symbolic value and representative of daily life in the region. Six months after her musical debut, Alwa joined the lineup of national artists present at the second edition of the Respira Bolivia festival, a cultural event that combined fashion, music and entertainment, and that brought together more than thirty musicians, DJs and groups.

At the third edition of the Bolivia Music Awards, held in Santa Cruz in 2023, Alwa was awarded in the category of Best Urban Artist, this being her first recognition in the musical field.

In 2024, the music video for Cumbia Revolucionaria was nominated for various international awards in the United States, Peru, and Argentina. Conceived by Alwa in collaboration with the production team, the music video addressed the lack of justice in the local context, and was filmed on location in Cochabamba and Santa Cruz before its premiere in June 2023. It was selected to participate in the twenty-sixth edition of the Las Américas International Film Festival, held in Texas, United States, from 15 to 19 May. At the Buenos Aires Music Video Festival, it won the award for Best Social Impact Video. That same year, Alwa received two nominations at the Muvid Awards organized by Music Video Perú: one for Best Latin American Video for Cumbia Revolucionaria and another for Best Direction for the music video for "La boliviana".

In March 2025, Alwa presented its brand Quya clothing during the Santa Cruz Week event. The proposal fuses elements of Andean culture, such as the pollera, with a contemporary urban aesthetic, seeking to highlight its symbolic value from a perspective of identity and resistance. On 9 April 2025, Alwa participated in the launch of the single "Hey! (¿Estás ahí?)" (Hey! (Are You There?)) with Luis Gamarra. The song, developed in a context of social and economic crisis, conveys messages of empathy, resilience, and unity.

== Musical style ==
In her early compositions, Alwa used Spanish as her primary language, later incorporating Aymara as a form of cultural representation. As the author of her own lyrics, she has noted that much of her artistic output is based on personal experiences linked to adverse situations, which she channels through music. Initially, Alwa did not have the full support of her family to pursue music; however, over time she managed to gain support, especially from her parents, who currently support her projects.

== Discography ==
Credits taken from iTunes.

=== Singles ===
- 2022: Principio sin fin
- 2022: Alwa
- 2023: Cumbia Revolucionaria
- 2023: La boliviana
- 2024: Perder El Miedo
- 2024: Siempre Con Tigo (ft. Corona)
- 2025: Hey! (¿Estás ahí?) (ft. Luis Gamarra)

== Awards and nominations ==
=== Bolivia Music Awards ===
Year	Category	Work	Result	Ref.
2023	Video of the Year	Cumbia revolucionaria	Nominated	
2023	Best Urban Artist (female)	Herself	Won	
2024	Female Artist of the Year	Herself	Nominated	
