= Luis Gamarra =

Bolivian singer (born 1992)

- Born: Luis Gamarra Mayser; 15 December 1992 (age 33); Santa Cruz de la Sierra, Bolivia
- Genre: Latin pop
- Occupation: Singer
- Instrument: Vocals
- Years active: 2013–present

Luis Gamarra Mayser (born 15 December 1992) is a Bolivian pop singer and LGBT rights activist.

In 2023, Gamarra adopted the stage name Gamay for his performances, a decision he reversed a year later by returning to his original name, Luis Gamarra.

== Early life ==
Since he was a child, Gamarra showed an innate talent for music. Despite being bullied at school due to his high-pitched voice and his love for singing and dancing, he found in music a means to be accepted. A modest school presentation at the age of 8 marked the beginning of Gamarra's passion for music. Since then, he became a regular participant in all the school festivals at his school, La Salle. At the age of 18, Gamarra left his studies at UPSA and his hometown, Santa Cruz, to pursue his musical dreams in the United States.

== Career ==
=== 2013–2016: Singing competitions and training at Berklee ===
At age 23, Gamarra rose to international fame in 2013 when he auditioned on the twelfth season of American Idol, produced by the Fox television network. His audition in front of celebrities Mariah Carey, Randy Jackson, Nicki Minaj and Keith Urban was unforgettable and was captured in a video that went viral. Thanks to these experiences, he entered the Berklee College of Music in 2014, located in Massachusetts, from where he studied music business and management and graduated in 2017.

In August 2014, Gamarra released his first album titled “Murallas”. The official presentation of the album took place on August 15 at the Big Apple of the Bolivian American Center. Later, in January 2015, Gamarra presented the video clip of "Murallas" filmed in Rhode Island.

In 2015, realizing that he was the only Bolivian at Berklee, Gamarra decided to found 'Sonidos Bolivianos', a non-profit organization. His goal was to provide other young Bolivians with the same opportunities he had, facilitating their access to the best artistic institutions in the world. As a result of the work of this Foundation, the Berklee College of Music extended its reach to Bolivia to carry out auditions, and now other talented Bolivians are pursuing their careers at that institution.

In collaboration with his foundation, Gamarra produced a commemorative version of the national anthem of Bolivia, just before 6 August, the day of the independence of Bolivia. This production featured the Berklee College of Music and several Bolivian musicians. The music video was filmed in the impressive setting of the Salar de Uyuni. Such was the impact and relevance of this production that the video was shared by the official networks of the Bolivian government in commemoration of the 191 years of Bolivia's independence.

Continuing with his career, in September 2015, Gamarra returned to the music reality show scene by participating in La Banda on the Univision television network in the United States. During his participation in the program, Gamarra impressed musical figures such as Ricky Martin, Laura Pausini and Alejandro Sanz, reinforcing his presence in music. However, his time on the program took an unexpected turn when Gamarra had to leave the competition due to health reasons. Despite his premature departure, Gamarra remained resilient and sent a heartfelt message to his fans. At the end of 2015, after his participation in 'La Banda', Gamarra was recognized as one of the People of the Year and received the Bronze Patujú, the highest award given by El Deber. He shared this honor with television host Anabel Angus.

During his time at Berklee in 2016, Gamarra worked on a notable project titled "Yo Soy Inmigrante", a song that pays tribute to the immigrant experience in America. The song was sponsored by the Berklee Institute of Creative Entrepreneurship (BerkleeICE) and featured 50 musicians and dancers from Berklee and The Boston Conservatory.

=== 2019–2022: Foray into film and collaboration with UNICEF ===
In mid-2019, Gamarra lent his voice and lyrics to the official song for "Tu me manques," a film by Bolivian director Rodrigo Bellot. Bellot's film premiered internationally at the Outfest Los Angeles Film Festival, one of the most important LGBTQ+ film festivals in the United States. The musical piece, titled "No cambio por ti," reflects Gamarra's experience growing up gay in Bolivia. In this way, both Gamarra's song and Bellott's film reflect the experiences of gay people in societies that don't accept them.

During the 2020 quarantine, Gamarra, along with Edmar Colón, performed "La Paz," a nearly five-minute musical piece available on YouTube that calls for global harmony. This song is the result of the project “Songs for World Peace”, led by Utako Toyama, a former student at Berklee College of Music. That same year, Gamarra released ‘Entre tú y yo’, a song that fuses pop with Bolivian folklore. The song, which tells of a forbidden encounter between two people, begins with urban-tinged pop sounds and then introduces zampoñas and the cadence of the saya, traditional sounds of Bolivia.

In March 2022, Gamarra released "Libre", his fourth and most introspective album, which includes six songs of his own authorship in genres such as urban pop, folk, rock, and ballad. This album, recorded between Los Angeles and Mexico City with the collaboration of renowned writers and producers, chronologically narrates his personal story, from the experience of his first love, through the brave act of revealing his sexual orientation, to reaching a state of inner peace and self-acceptance. Additionally, it was honored as Album of the Year at the Bolivia Music Awards.

In June 2022, Gamarra released the single "De Viaje" in collaboration with UNICEF and the Familia Segura program. The song, which Gamarra composed during a difficult time in his life, seeks to promote the importance of mental health among young people and adolescents. The "De Viaje" campaign also included Gamarra's testimony about his own struggles with mental health. Towards the end of 2022, Gamarra collaborated with Lu de la Tower to make a remix of "De Viaje". This joint effort sought to further amplify the impact of the original campaign and reaffirm his commitment to humanitarian causes.

=== 2023–present: Brief retirement and transition to Gamay ===
In mid-2023, Gamarra announced his retirement from music. However, at the end of the same year, he returned to the music scene with a new stage name, Gamay. The name Gamay is a combination of his two surnames, Gamarra and Mayser, in homage to his family. With this change, he released his first single "Encontrándome", a song that combines cheerful pop rhythms with reflective and positive lyrics. The single was accompanied by a music video that told the story of how Luis Gamarra found his true essence being recognized as Videoclip of the Year at the Bolivia Music Awards 2023.

During the month of May 2023, UNICEF Bolivia presented the telethon "Tiempo de Actuar 2023", which took place on June 4 and broadcast through Red Uno de Bolivia. This campaign sought to turn obstacles into opportunities for girls and the country's children. As part of this initiative, Gamarra actively participated in promoting the telethon.

In July 2024, Gamarra returned to his original stage name, Luis Gamarra, after a year of performing under the pseudonym Gamay. The decision marked the beginning of a new phase in his career, accompanied by the re-release of the single "Finding Me" and the production of his third album, "De Viaje," recorded in Mexico with producer Daniel "Vago" Galindo.

On 9 April 2025, the single "Hey! (¿Estás ahí?)" (Hey! (Are You There?)) was released, a collaboration with Alwa, recognized as Bolivia's first cholita rapper. The song, composed in a context of social and economic crisis, addresses messages of empathy, resilience, and unity, and is part of the thematic focus on mental health and personal development that has characterized his career.

== Personal life ==
=== Sexual orientation ===
In October 2018, Gamarra made his sexual orientation public through an open letter on his Facebook account titled "It Was Always Me." In the letter, Gamarra introduces his partner, Brian, and speaks openly about the struggle he faced due to his sexual orientation.

Gamarra publicly shared his five-year relationship and the process of coming out to his family, a moment that, although painful, resulted in family support. Despite concerns about potential backlash, he published an open letter that was well-received, garnering many supportive comments. Additionally, Gamarra encouraged others in similar situations to live authentically and keep the faith.

During the pandemic in 2020, Gamarra joined the Bolivia LGBTIQ Pride March, which was held virtually. Gamarra opened the march with his song "Libre" and led a list of the marchers. of musicians who participated in the event. This act of participation in the virtual march is a reflection of their commitment to equal rights and the visibility of the LGBTIQ community.

=== Political activism ===
At the age of 24, in 2017, Gamarra had the opportunity to deliver a speech at the Organization of American States. During his speech, he expressed his concern for democracy in South America and joined the Bolivian voices calling for support to prevent Bolivia from following the path of Venezuela.

In 2019, Gamarra protested outside the OAS in Washington, D.C., in response to alleged fraud in that year's Bolivian elections. He shared a video of his protest on social media, calling for respect for the Bolivian vote.

== Discography ==
Credits taken from iTunes.

=== Compilation albums ===
- 2022: Libre

=== EPs ===
- 2025: Mejor

=== Singles ===
- 2017: 1-800-273-8255
- 2017: Sigue Pa' delante
- 2019: Por un Beso
- 2019: Por un Beso (Remix)
- 2020: Libre
- 2020: Entre Tú Y Yo
- 2022: No Siento Más (Live Session) (featuring SMJ)
- 2022: De Viaje
- 2022: De Viaje (featuring Lu de la Tower)
- 2023: Mi Dosis De Drama
- 2024: Encontrándome
- 2024: Dónde realmente estoy
- 2024: Hey! ¿Estás ahí?
- 2025: Lo que tenga que pasar (featuring Paola Sulser)
- 2025: HEY! ¿ESTÁS AHÍ? (featuring Alwa Bolivia)

== Awards and nominations ==
=== Bolivia Music Awards ===
Year	Category	Work	Result	Ref.
2021	Best Music Video with a Positive Message	Libre	Won	
2021	Best Foreign Artist	Himself	Nominated	
2021	Male Artist of the Year	Himself	Nominated	
2022	Album of the Year	Libre	Won	
2022	Song of the Year	De Viaje	Nominated	
2022	Best Pop Artist	Himself	Nominated	
2022	Male Artist of the Year	Himself	Nominated	
2023	Video of the Year	Encontrándome	Won	
2023	Best Pop Artist	Himself	Nominated	
2023	Breakthrough Artist	Himself	Nominated	
2023	Male Artist of the Year	Himself	Nominated	
2024	Best Pop Artist	Himself	Nominated	
2024	Best Foreign Artist	Himself	Won	
