= Vaccix =

Bolivian singer (born 1999)

- Born: María Lucía Aramayo Díez de Medina; 4 August 1999 (age 26); Santa Cruz de la Sierra, Bolivia
- Genres: Latin trap; Latin hip hop
- Occupations: Singer; rapper; songwriter
- Instrument: Vocals
- Years active: 2017–present

María Lucía Aramayo Díez de Medina (born 4 August 1999), better known by her stage name Vaccix, is a Bolivian singer, rapper, songwriter, and clothing designer. She began her musical career in 2017 and has explored a variety of genres, including trap and hip hop. She currently resides in both Buenos Aires and Santa Cruz.

== Career ==
Vaccix settled in Argentina at the age of 13, marking the beginning of her musical career in this country. She studied fashion design in Buenos Aires, where she founded her own clothing and accessories brand called Mery Vaccix, which served as inspiration for adopting her stage name Vaccix. Although this name has an apparent connection with numerology, Vaccix has chosen to keep its meaning secret, revealing it only after achieving a personal goal.

Vaccix career took off in 2019 with the release of "Choca Bandida", a collaboration with fellow Santa Cruz native Corona. During the pandemic, she created a song titled "Cuarentena", which reflects her experience during confinement. Aware of the lack of female representation in Bolivia's urban music scene, she felt compelled to return to her native country to actively integrate into the music industry and contribute to changing this situation.

On 29 June 2021, Vaccix arrived in Santa Cruz, and just three months later, she was singing for Sara Hebe. Upon her return, she released "Ay Ay Ay" in collaboration with Viudita Moderna, a song that accumulated 75 thousand views on YouTube in just one week. This musical piece, conceived during her stay in Argentina three years before its publication, initially began recording at Tiluchi Records with the intention of making a duet with the musician Corona. However, it was not until her return to Bolivia that the project was completed and the song was finally released in a video clip under the production of Saqra Collective, with the collaboration of Viudita Moderna. In September of that same year, Vaccix made five more new releases, of which four were among the 50 most listened to songs on Spotify in Bolivia. This effort culminated in her recognition as Best New Artist at the Bolivia Music Awards 2021.

Later, on the eve of Bolivian Women's Day, on 9 October 2021, the Music Festival with M for Women was held at the Meraki Theater in Santa Cruz with the purpose of highlighting and celebrating female talent in the music industry. Vaccix participated in the event alongside other national artists such as Lu de la Tower, Mariana Massiel, Viudita Moderna, Las Majas, among others.

In mid-March 2023, Vaccix suffered an accident that resulted in severe burns all over her body, leading to her admission to an Intensive Care Unit (ICU) in Argentina on 13 March. During her time in the hospital, she required multiple interventions from the plastic surgery and internal medicine teams of both Bolivia and Argentina. Despite the clinical complications, Vaccix slowly managed to overcome these challenges.

After her recovery, Vaccix returned to the music scene with new projects. She released a new song titled "Quemando veneno". The song was created in early March, but its release had to be postponed due to her health condition. In July 2023, she made the release of her album public.

In February 2024, Vaccix released the album Apolo 44, consisting of 8 songs that explore a wide variety of musical genres, including reggaeton, trap, boom bap and experimental, with notable collaborations. The album's name is inspired by the Greek god Apollo, who personifies both medicine and art, reflecting the duality between Vaccix's artistic expression and her clinical past, evident after the accident she suffered. Furthermore, the choice of the number 44 for the album is symbolic, representing the sum of the 8 songs that compose it.

== Discography ==
Credits taken from iTunes.

=== Studio albums ===
- 2024: Apolo 44

=== Singles ===
- 2019: Choca Bandida (ft. Corona)
- 2020: Cuarentena
- 2021: Basura
- 2021: Ay, ay, ay (ft. Viudita Moderna)
- 2022: Sola
- 2022: Soberbia
- 2022: Efímero (ft. Angel Blanchard)
- 2022: Zafiro
- 2023: All ma Bithches
- 2023: Quemando Veneno (ft. Red Shine)
- 2025: No sé amar (ft. Chin)
- 2025: Modo asesina (ft. Viudita Moderna)
- 2025: Dydy (ft. Chin)

== Awards and nominations ==
=== Bolivia Music Awards ===
Year	Category	Work	Result	Ref.
2021	Best New Artist	Herself	Won	
2022	Best Urban Artist (female)	Herself	Nominated	
2022	Video of the Year	Sola	Nominated	
2022	Female Artist of the Year	Herself	Nominated	
2023	Best Urban Artist (female)	Herself	Nominated	
2024	Album of the Year	Apolo 44	Nominated	
2024	Best Urban Artist (female)	Herself	Nominated	
