= Javvi Elias =

Bolivian singer (born 1997)

- Born: Javier Elias Irigoyen Soto; 27 February 1997 (age 28); Santa Cruz de la Sierra, Bolivia
- Genres: Latin pop; pop rock; electronic
- Occupations: Singer; songwriter; record producer
- Instrument: Vocals
- Years active: 2016–present

Javier Elias Irigoyen Soto (born 27 February 1997), known professionally as Javvi Elias, is a Bolivian singer, songwriter and record producer, recognized for his work in the field of pop music. He also shows his versatility as an actor, having been certified by the HAPA academy after his training under the guidance of Reinaldo Pacheco.

Elias has been awarded three Maya Awards in Bolivia, obtaining significant recognitions such as "Breakthrough Artist of the Year", "Artist with the Greatest International Projection" and "Artist of the Year 2023". In addition, he has been awarded the Bolivia Music Awards as "Best Pop Artist" on two consecutive occasions, in 2022 and 2023.

Elias stands out as the first Bolivian artist to record the simultaneous presence of two songs in the Top Viral 50 of Spotify Bolivia, both placed among the ten most popular for five consecutive weeks. This milestone was achieved with "El Universo A Tu Favor" (at position #7) and "Desconoci2" (at position #1).

== Early life ==
Elias grew up in a family environment, with his father, Javier Irigoyen, as his manager since the beginning of his career, and his mother, Viviana Soto, as his costume designer. It was precisely this close relationship with his parents that inspired him to merge their names to create his stage name.

== Career ==
At the age of 17, Elias founded and led Midnight Dreamers, an English-language pop band that stood out for receiving international recognition, reaching the finals of the International Songwriting Competition, and for their performances on renowned stages in cities such as Miami, Boston, Washington, New York, and Los Angeles. In 2021, however, the band disbanded, as Elias decided to pursue his solo career and explore new musical opportunities.

Elias made his solo debut on 17 June 2022, with his single "Desconoci2", which was highly successful in Bolivia and Latin America. This pop song accumulated more than 300,000 views on YouTube and 200,000 plays on Spotify, in addition to going viral on TikTok and other platforms. Its success is partly attributed to his outstanding performance at Respira Bolivia Vol 2 on 3 September 2022, which went viral on social media.

In March 2023, Elias reached the final of the International Songwriting Competition with his song "Desconoci2", facing thousands of composers from around the world, standing out as a finalist in the Latin category. Although he did not manage to place in the top positions, he received a well-deserved honorable mention for his outstanding participation.

In early February 2024, Luis Vega and Elias released the song "Voy a Desaparecer", a heartbreak song that quickly became the most listened to in all of Bolivia. This success took it to number one in YouTube trends, accumulating more than 1 million views in less than two weeks. In addition, the song managed to enter the Top 100 of Apple Music Bolivia and appear in the Top Virales of Spotify Bolivia, surpassing renowned artists in the industry. The song was later recognized at the Bolivia Music Awards 2024, where it won the awards for Best Song of the Year and Best Collaboration.

== Discography ==
Credits taken from iTunes.

=== Singles ===
- 2021: Contigo (ft. Blezzing & Tbaze)
- 2022: Desconoci2
- 2022: El universo a tu favor
- 2023: Suave
- 2023: TIC TAC
- 2023: El Porsche
- 2023: DIVVA
- 2023: Encamotao
- 2024: Voy a desaparecer (ft. Luis Vega)
- 2024: Merezco perderte
- 2024: Ur Gangsta (ft. Ángel Dior)
- 2025: Van Gogh
- 2025: Maldita Suerte
- 2025: Invicto

== Awards and nominations ==
=== Bolivia Music Awards ===
Year	Category	Work	Result	Ref.
2021	Video of the Year	Eres tú	Nominated	
2021	Group of the Year	Midnight Dreamers	Nominated	
2022	Song of the Year	Desconoci2	Nominated	
2022	Best Pop Artist	Himself	Won	
2022	Male Artist of the Year	Himself	Nominated	
2023	Song of the Year	El Porsche	Nominated	
2023	Composer of the Year	Himself	Nominated	
2023	Best Pop Artist	Himself	Won	
2023	Male Artist of the Year	Himself	Nominated	
2024	Best Pop Artist	Himself	Nominated	
2024	Singer-songwriter of the Year	Himself	Nominated	
2024	Song of the Year	Voy a desaparecer	Won	
2024	Best Collaboration	Voy a desaparecer	Won	
2024	Video of the Year	Voy a desaparecer	Nominated	
2024	Best International Collaboration	Ur Gangsta	Nominated	
2024	Male Artist of the Year	Himself	Nominated	

=== International Songwriting Competition ===
Year	Category	Work	Result	Ref.
2020	Latin music	Barú	Honorable mention	
2023	Latin music	Desconoci2	Honorable mention	

=== Maya Awards ===
Year	Category	Work	Result	Ref.
2018	Breakthrough Musical Group	Midnight Dreamers	Won	
2021	Group of Greater Projection	Midnight Dreamers	Won	
2023	Bolivian Artist of the Year	Himself	Won	
