= Reggae Fest =

- Genre: Reggae
- Locations: Luque, Paraguay
- Years active: 2009-present
- Attendance: 10000+

The Reggae Fest is the most important reggae held in Paraguay. With an annual frequency, the festival takes place at the Rakiura Resort, located in the city of Luque, Paraguay. The first edition took place on September 27, 2009, reaching an audience of 10000 attendees. The second edition took place on September 26, 2010, in the same venue reaching 9000 people of attendance.

== Reggae Fest I ==
Bands:

- The Wailers
- Fidel Nadal
- Matamba
- Pipa para Tabaco
- Cultura Nativa

== Reggae Fest II ==
Bands:

- Ese Ka’a
- Nonpalidece
- Skatalites
- Matamba
- No Te Va Gustar

== See also ==
- List of reggae festivals
- List of festivals in Paraguay
