= 9 Mile Music Festival =

Music festival in Miami, Florida

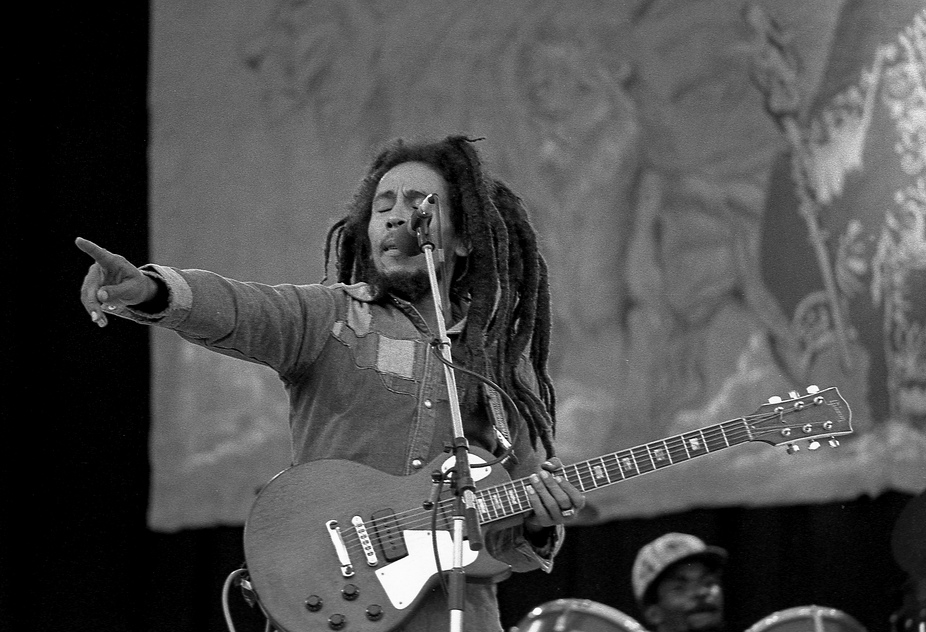
The 9 Mile Music Festival was created to pay tribute to the legendary Bob Marley.

The 9 Mile Music Festival, also known as the Bob Marley Festival, Bob Fest, Marley Fest and Caribbean Festival, is an annual music event which began in 1993 in Miami. 9 Mile was pioneered by Bob Marley's mother, Cedella Marley Booker, to pay tribute to the legacy of her late son, and his messages of peace, love and unity. The festival maintains a tradition of collecting canned goods upon admission, to continue efforts to give back to the community. Donations go towards feeding the less fortunate in South Florida and the Caribbean. Over 2 million cans have been donated over the years.

== The festival ==
The one-day music festival has taken place every year since 1993, except 2020-21. The festival is largely focused on reggae, but also incorporates other music genres like dance, hip hop, rock and R&B.

Bob Marley's children Ziggy Marley, Stephen Marley, Julian Marley, Ky-mani Marley and Damian Marley have performed at many of the editions. Other performers have included Carlos Santana, Lauryn Hill, Hootie & the Blowfish, Erykah Badu, Burning Spear, Buju Banton, Sizzla Kalonji, Capleton, Pitbull, 2 Chainz, Future, T.I., Tarrus Riley, Konshens, Machel Montano, Diana King, SOJA, Slightly Stoopid, Thievery Corporation, Sean Paul, Shaggy, Mavado, DMX, India Arie, Inner Circle and Major Lazer.

The festival offers an array of booths for artist merchandise, local vendors and academics to share their goods and services. Booths offer food and drinks from may different cultures including Jamaican, Chinese, Spanish and American food as well as a wide variety of vegetarian and vegan dishes.

The 24th Annual 9 Mile Music Festival had showcased a holistic village which featured various booths for acupuncture, massages, yoga, body painting and a drum circle on the beach. Nutritionists and life coaches will be offering advice and services for those interested.

No festivals were held in 2020-21.

== History ==
Conceived and created in 1993 by Cedella Marley Booker, the mother of Jamaican reggae singer, songwriter, musician, and guitarist Bob Marley, the festival has been held every year since. The festival is organized by 9 Mile Entertainment, a business run by Cedella Marley Booker's son Richard Booker. The 9 Mile Music Festival was envisioned by Cedella and Richard to serve the Bob Marley and the Waliers Fan Club in honor Bob Marley's memory in song and philanthropy.

The spirit of the festival is that by working together people can make big differences in helping their communities. As part of the entrance fee, attendees bring four canned goods on the day of the event – or make a financial donation as part of the admission to the event. The donations are collected and distributed to charities to help feed the needy in the Miami area.

The festival became known early on as the Marley Fest because of its founder and the inspiration drawn from Cedella's late son with Bob Marley's sons performing each year.

The festival has gone through a series of name changes. These include the Bob Marley Festival, Marley Fest and The Caribbean Festival.

In 2011, the festival was rebranded as the 9 Mile Music Festival. The name derives from Nine Mile, a village in Saint Ann Parish, Jamaica where Bob Marley was born, began his musical career and found inspiration for many of his songs. Nine Mile is home to the Bob Marley Mausoleum, which showcases many of his awards, guitars and photographs. It has become a tourist attraction in Jamaica and is also the place where both Cedella and Richard Booker are buried.

This festival went on hiatus in 2020-21.

== Charity ==
In honor of Bob Marley's philanthropic efforts during his lifetime, the Festival, in coordination with Cedella Marley Booker's philanthropic organization, Movement of Jah People, collects four canned goods or financial donations from every attendee as part of admission. The events have collected more than three million canned goods in its 22 years. Goods are donated to local and international charities and shelters in South Florida and Jamaica.

== 2011 lineup ==
- Date: March 12, 2011
- Venue: Bayfront Park, Miami
- Lineup: Stephen Marley, Damian Marley, Julian Marley, Ky-Mani Marley, Christopher Ellis, Slightly Stoopid, Inner Circle, Major Lazer, Thievery Corporation, DJ Mala, DJ Hatcha & DJ Juan Basshead.

== 2012 lineup ==
- Date: March 3, 2012
- Venue: Virginia Key Beach Park
- Lineup: Stephen Marley, Damian Marley, Julian Marley, Capelton, Burning Spear, Wale, Richie Spice, Melanie Fiona, Collie Buddz & Cocoa Tea.

== 2013 lineup ==
- Date: March 2, 2013
- Venue: Virginia Key Beach Park
- Lineup: Stephen Marley, Damian Marley, Julian Marley, Capelton, Mavado, 2 Chains & Future.

== 2014 lineup ==
- Date: February 15, 2014
- Venue: Miami Dade County Fair & Expo Center
- Lineup: Stephen Marley, Damian Marley, Julian Marley, Sean Paul, Lauryn Hill, Mavado, Ken Y, Chronixx, Mavado, Alika & Nueva Alianza.

== 2015 lineup ==
- Date: February 14, 2015
- Venue: Dade County Fairgrounds
- Lineup: Stephen Marley, Damian Marley, Julian Marley, Tanya Stephens, The Green, Capleton, Jo Mersa Marley, SOJA and Jesse Royal.

== 2016 lineup ==
- Date: February 27, 2016
- Venue: Virginia Key Beach Park
- Lineup: Stephen Marley, Damian Marley, Julian Marley, Skip Marley, Nas, Capleton, Konshens, Mr. Cheeks, Protoje, Kabaka Pyramid, Styleon, K CAMP, Locos Por Juana and Shacia Marley.

== 2017 lineup ==
- Date: March 11, 2017
- Venue: Virginia Key Beach Park
- Lineup: Stephen Marley, Damian Marley, Julian Marley, Capleton, DMX, Charly Black, Sizzla, Matamba, Kreesha Turner, DJ Jahstream, DJ Mighty Crown & Lance-O of Kulcha Shok.

== 2019 lineup ==
- Date: March 9, 2019
- Venue: Virginia Key Beach Park
- Lineup: Nas, Shabba Ranks, Sizzla, Busy Signal, Capleton, Spice, Barrington Levy & DJ Mighty Crown

== See also ==
- List of reggae festivals
- Nas
- Bob Marley
- Cedella Marley Booker
- Bob Marley and the Wailers
- Reggae
- Bob Marley Museum
- Virginia Key Beach Park
