= Cs Corona =

Bolivian singer (born 1996)

- Also known as: Corona
- Born: Juan Rafael Coronado Yucra; 26 July 1996 (age 29); Santa Cruz de la Sierra, Bolivia
- Genres: Latin trap
- Occupation: Singer
- Instrument: Vocals
- Years active: 2014–present

Juan Rafael Coronado Yucra (born 26 July 1996), known professionally as Cs Corona or simply Corona, is a Bolivian Latin trap singer, considered the greatest exponent of this genre in Bolivia.

== Early life and education ==
Corona began making music in 2014 and has since become a leading figure in his genre in Bolivia. Born in the Virgen de Guadalupe neighborhood, he was a gang member in his teens until he decided to dedicate himself to music. He also enrolled at Gabriel René Moreno Autonomous University, studying industrial engineering and computer science, but did not complete his studies.

== Career ==
In addition to his solo career, Corona is also the leader of the hip hop group Cruz Santa, made up of young people between the ages of 17 and 32. This group began around 2014. He also works with the production company Tiluchi Records.

In 2019, Corona released "Choca Bandida", a collaboration with fellow Santa Cruz native Vaccix. In 2021, he was nominated as a promising artist at the Billboard Awards, and also participated in the first edition of the Respira festival, a prominent event in the music industry. In addition, he won the award for Best Urban Artist of the Year at the 2021 Bolivia Music Awards. In 2022 he released his first studio album, Boliganga SRL. That same year, he shared the stage with reggaeton singer Daddy Yankee in the city of Santa Cruz. He also shared the stage with Argentine artist L-Gante.

To the rhythm of ranchera music and rap, Corona and singer Luis Vega released the song "Desvelados" on 25 March 2023. Later, in November of the same year, he collaborated with Lu de la Tower on the song "Error 403", a pop-rock fusion that reached number one in plays in Bolivia and was positioned at number 22 in the national Top 50 on Spotify. The song was later preselected for the Latin Grammys, marking an outstanding recognition in the career of the artist.

With "Mi Debilidad", a collaboration with Luis Vega and Bonny Lovy released in March 2025, Corona ventured into salsa using the Santa Cruz History Museum as the location for the music video. The song was published on digital platforms and reached 11,000 views on YouTube during its first 12 hours. The proposal sought to expand its presence in Latin music through a collaboration.

== Musical style ==
Corona's music is characterized by its oppositional nature, denouncing police violence, political corruption, and street life in Santa Cruz. It also refers to marijuana use.

== Discography ==
=== Studio albums ===
- Boliganga SRL (2022)

=== Singles ===
- 2019: Choca bandida (ft. Vaccix)
- 2020: Boliganga (Frestyle)
- 2020: Santa Cruz (ft. Nahu Baby y El OG)
- 2020: JBL
- 2020: La bandera 'ta al revés (ft. Cruz Santa y Yimbo)
- 2020: Jonny Cash
- 2020: Los Wasos
- 2020: Cuba y las cubanas
- 2021: Los muchachones
- 2021: Puro Rojo
- 2021: Toy de gira
- 2021: Luces, fotos, entrevistas
- 2022: Me siento mal (ft. Yimbo)
- 2022: Pal próximo presidente
- 2023: Velocidad, calidad, cobertura (ft. Tigo Bolivia)
- 2023: De nuevo en el boliche
- 2023: Desvelado (ft. Luis Vega)
- 2023: Su consentido
- 2023: Error 403 (ft. Lu de la Tower)
- 2024: Toca disfrutar (ft. Reek)
- 2024: Que tengo que hacer
- 2024: Boliganga 3
- 2024: Galáctico (ft. Young Jairo)
- 2024: No me importa
- 2024: Criminal (ft. Yimbo)
- 2024: Siempre con Tigo (ft. Tigo Bolivia and Alwa Bolivia)
- 2024: Sufro (ft. Bonny Lovy)
- 2024: Tu Yango (ft. Yango)
- 2025: Soy Rechazado (ft. Comparsa Rechazados)
- 2025: Verdes pa gastar
- 2025: Mi debilidad (ft. Bonny Lovy and Luis Vega)
- 2025: Por última vez (ft. No comparto a mis amigos)
- 2025: Alucina tu Pilfrut (ft. Pilfrut)

== Awards and nominations ==
=== Bolivia Music Awards ===
Year	Category	Work	Result	Ref.
2021	Song of the Year	Pedidos Yema	Nominated	
2021	Best Urban Artist (male)	Himself	Won	
2022	Album of the Year	Boliganga SRL	Nominated	
2022	Song of the Year	Que estás haciendo	Nominated	
2022	Best Urban Artist (male)	Himself	Nominated	
2022	Male Artist of the Year	Himself	Nominated	
2023	Best Urban Artist (male)	Himself	Nominated	
2023	Video of the Year	Desvelado	Nominated	
2023	Male Artist of the Year	Himself	Nominated	
2024	Best Urban Artist (male)	Himself	Nominated	
2024	Best Collaboration	Error 403	Nominated	
2024	Best Collaboration	Galáctico	Nominated	
2024	Male Artist of the Year	Himself	Nominated	
