= Luciel Izumi =

Bolivian charangist and composer

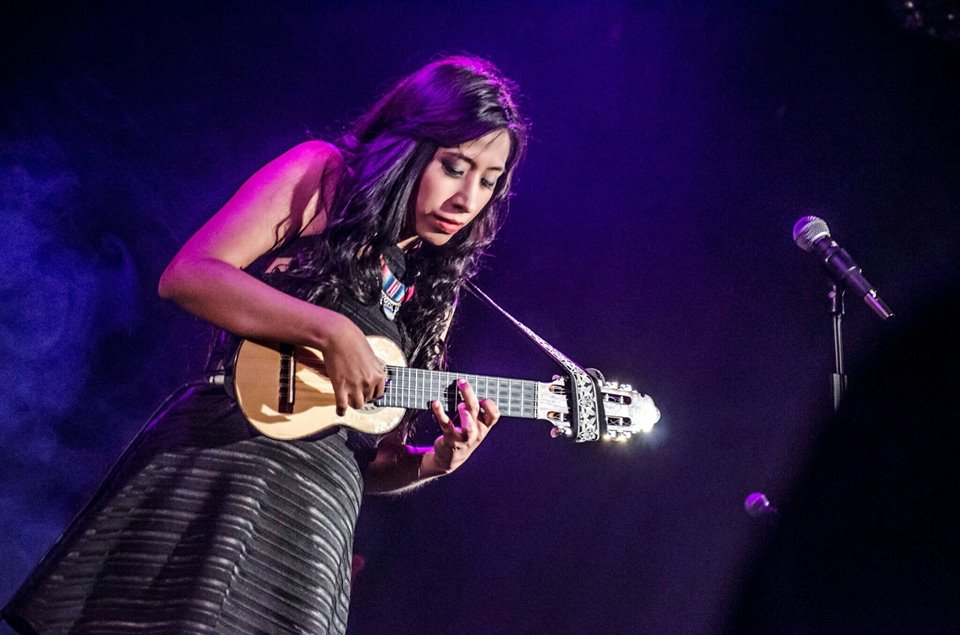
- Izumi in 2017

Background information
- Born: Luciel Izumi Espinoza Núñez; 23 July 1996 (age 29); La Paz, Bolivia
- Years active: 2006–present

Luciel Izumi Espinoza Núñez (born 23 July 1996) is a Bolivian charangist and composer. She began her career under the influence of maestro William Centellas and others. She has won important awards at the Aiquile Charango Festival, among other competitions. She is the leader of the musical group Luciel Izumi Jazz Quartet.

== Biography ==
Izumi was born in La Paz and raised in Cochabamba. She is the daughter of cultural manager Lilian Núñez Velásquez and musician Donato Espinoza, a former member of Savia Andina. Izumi is the younger sister of Clara Espinoza and Hugo Domínguez, with whom she grew up and supported her early career by paying for her lessons and giving her her first charango. She began her musical career in the world of charango at a school in her neighborhood. She subsequently continued her training as a self-taught artist.

== Musical career ==
Izumi began performing at inter-school festivals in 2006, and years later joined the Santa Ana School Philharmonic Orchestra as a soloist. In Bolivia, she was a headliner at Cochabamba's Festijazz for two consecutive years, and in Chile, she participated in the WOMAD cultural festival. Her musical experience led Izumi to become a teacher at the Escuela Popular de Artes and to give private charango lessons. "I teach and continue to learn from jazz masters."

As a solo artist, she has released a studio album and a single under the name "Luciel Izumi."

In September 2023, Izumi, Chila Jatun, Lu de la Tower and Bonny Lovy collaborated to release the song "Juntos Sonamos Más Fuerte", a melody that highlights the diversity of Bolivia and is a mix of cumbia and salay, characteristic genres of Bolivia. The collaboration culminated in notable recognition, as the song was awarded Best Collaboration at the Bolivia Music Awards 2023.

== Discography ==
- Emociones (2012)
- Un mismo suspirar (2016)
- Single (2017)
- Tsuki
