= Lu de la Tower =

Bolivian singer (born 2000)

- Born: Luciana de la Torre; 12 January 2000 (age 25); Santa Cruz de la Sierra, Bolivia
- Genres: Latin pop
- Occupation: Singer
- Instrument: Vocals
- Years active: 2021–present

Luciana de la Torre (born 12 January 2000), known professionally as Lu de la Tower, is a Bolivian singer from Santa Cruz de la Sierra. She has been recognized as Female Artist of the Year at the Bolivia Music Awards for three consecutive years, from 2021 to 2023.

== Early life ==
De la Tower's passion for music manifested itself from an early age, thanks to the influence of her parents, who introduced her to various musical genres such as Argentine rock. Thus, from an early age, she learned to sing, dance, act, and play the guitar.

During her adolescence, de la Tower participated in several rock bands in her hometown. However, she decided to pause her musical career due to certain personal insecurities. Later, she moved to Buenos Aires, Argentina, to study advertising, but after two years, she decided to abandon her studies to pursue her true calling: music.

== Career ==
Despite the challenges presented by the COVID-19 pandemic, de la Tower returned to Santa Cruz and decided to launch her musical career. In May 2021, she released her first original song, Electricidad. Her next single arrived in July 2021 with the track Runaway (Indie Kid), which quickly accumulated over 250,000 views on YouTube on its release date. On 9 October of that year, on the eve of Women's Day, de la Tower, along with other prominent Bolivian musical artists such as Vaccix, Mariana Massiel, and Viudita Moderna, participated in the Music Festival with M for Women at the Meraki Theater in Santa Cruz de la Sierra, with the purpose of highlighting and celebrating female talent in the music industry.

At the end of 2022, Luis Gamarra and de la Tower collaborated on the promotion of the remix of the song De viaje. This initiative, with an altruistic purpose, sought to inspire hope and support UNICEF's 800-11-3040 number, intended for mental health emergencies in Bolivia. Originally, the mental health campaign, led by Gamarra, was launched by UNICEF in June of the same year and featured the original version of the song De viaje. However, to amplify the impact of the campaign and strengthen its commitment to humanitarian causes, Gamarra decided to release a remix in collaboration with de la Tower.

In April 2023, de la Tower performed at the Feria Nacional de San Marcos in Aguascalientes, Mexico, as a guest artist on the Popular Cultures Stage of the Carranza Cultural Corridor. A few months later, in June of the same year, de la Tower participated in Hijos AdopTikToks 2, a virtual competition designed to discover and promote new musical talents in Latin America, organized by the renowned Mexican actor Eugenio Derbez. This competition offered emerging artists the opportunity to be "adopted" by Derbez, which implies receiving support to boost their musical careers. de la Tower demonstrated her talent and determination by reaching the final stage of the competition, standing out among the ten finalists. However, the final winner of the reality show turned out to be the talented Ecuadorian singer Mar Rendón.

Later, in September of the same year, de la Tower joined forces with Bonny Lovy, Chila Jatun and Luciel Izumi to collaborate on the song Juntos Sonamos Más Fuerte (Together We Sound Stronger), a melody that highlights Bolivia's diversity and is a blend of cumbia and salay, characteristic Bolivian genres.

Ending the year, in November, de la Tower collaborated with Bolivian trap singer Corona to release the song Error 403. This song fused the musical styles and genres of both artists, reaching number 1 in Bolivia. Later, the track managed to position itself at number 22 in the Bolivian Top 50 on Spotify, further consolidating the success of this unique collaboration. Based on the impact of this collaboration, Error 403 was preselected for the Latin Grammys, marking a milestone in the artist's career. In this context, de la Tower moved to Mexico with the aim of expanding her networks in the music industry, stating that the decision to migrate was motivated by the need to generate new opportunities and professional connections.

== Social media activity ==
In July 2023, de la Tower caused a stir on social media by posting an emotional video in which she expressed her anguish and disappointment at the lack of support that Bolivian producers provide to national talent. In the video, which went viral in a matter of hours, she was visibly affected, while denouncing that local artists do not receive any compensation when they participate in concerts as opening acts. An experience that she herself knew when opening for international artists such as Sebastián Yatra, Camilo and Florencia Bertotti revealing that these opportunities were also instances in which she did not receive any compensation and all expenses were out of her own pocket.

In early 2024, de la Tower reported on social media the harassment she had suffered at the hands of a businessman from a well-known event venue in Santa Cruz. Initially, what appeared to be an invitation for her to sing at the venue took a worrying turn as its tone escalated to levels of harassment, where, after Lu's persistent refusals, the situation escalated and culminated in insults and contempt from the businessman. In response, de la Tower shared her experience online, receiving widespread support from the community.

== Discography ==
Credits taken from iTunes.

=== Singles ===
- "Electricidad" (2021)
- "Runaway (Indie Kid)" (2021)
- "Not Your Baby (NYBB)" (2021)
- "No te quedes" (2021)
- "Una y Otra Vez" (2022)
- "Desorientada" (2022)
- "De Viaje (Remix)" (with Luis Gamarra) (2022)
- "Ya" (with Ocasional Talento) (2023)
- "Me da igual" (2023)
- "No quería nada serio" (2023)
- "Juntos Sonamos Más Fuerte" (with Bonny Lovy, Chila Jatun and Luciel Izumi) (2023)
- "Error 403" (with Corona) (2023)
- "Remember" (with Y E L L O W) (2024)

== Awards and nominations ==
=== Bolivia Music Awards ===
Year	Category	Work	Result	Ref.
2021	Video of the Year	Runaway	Nominated	
2021	Female Breakthrough Artist	Herself	Nominated	
2021	Female Artist of the Year	Herself	Won	
2022	Best Artist of Bolivia Music's Ranking	Una y Otra vez	Nominated	
2022	Song of the Year	Una y Otra vez	Nominated	
2022	Best Pop Artist	Herself	Nominated	
2022	Female Artist of the Year	Herself	Won	
2023	Song of the Year	Me da igual	Nominated	
2023	Best Collaboration	Juntos Sonamos Más Fuerte	Won	
2023	Best Pop Artist	Herself	Nominated	
2023	Female Artist of the Year	Herself	Won	
2024	Best Pop Artist	Herself	Nominated	
2024	Best Collaboration	Error 403	Nominated	
2024	Female Artist of the Year	Herself	Nominated	
