= Luis Vega (singer) =

Bolivian singer (born 1992)

- Born: Luís Esteban Solíz Flores; 2 December 1992 (age 33); Santa Cruz de la Sierra, Bolivia
- Genres: Regional Mexican; corrido
- Occupations: Singer; songwriter
- Instrument: Vocals

Luís Esteban Solíz Flores (born 2 December 1992), known professionally as Luís Vega, is a Bolivian singer and songwriter of Regional Mexican music.

He gained recognition and achieved fame by composing songs inspired by the stories shared by his followers on social media. These narratives fueled his creativity, serving as the basis for the creation and production of his musical tracks. Vega was recognized as "Male Artist of the Year" at the 2023 and 2024 Bolivia Music Awards.

== Musical career ==
=== Beginnings as a singer ===
Raised in the Guapurú neighborhood of Plan 3000, in Santa Cruz de la Sierra, Vega spent his childhood there before, in 2008, the Soliz-Flores family decided to move to Argentina in search of new opportunities, given the lack of stability in Bolivia, settling in the city of Córdoba for four years. During that time, Vega and his brother David participated in a singing competition on Marcelo Tinelli's show. Although they did not advance in the competition, they continued working on their musical careers. During his stay in Argentina, Vega dedicated three years to studying architecture, influenced by the recommendation of his father, who had worked in the construction industry for many years. Although he eventually dropped out, Vega values the experience for giving him an appreciation for design and the ability to visualize projects. After a few years in Argentina, they returned to Bolivia to continue pursuing their musical dreams.

Vega, with roots in a family with a deep artistic tradition that has shaped his growth in this field, found inspiration in his grandfather, Luis Jilguero Flores, who was a pioneer of the mariachi genre in Santa Cruz, which led him to delve into regional Mexican music. His mother provides him with vocal instruction, while his father is in charge of artistic management. In addition, his brother David Soliz, who is also active in the music scene, is a source of inspiration and constant support in his career.

In 2016, the Unitel television network introduced the Spanish franchise Star Academy in Bolivia under the name "La Fábrica de Estrellas by Star Academy", a talent show that offered participants comprehensive training in singing, dancing, stagecraft, and body language in a high-performance music academy. In its first edition, Vega's brother, David Soliz, was crowned the winner. Buoyed by this success, a year later, Vega decided to participate in the second season of the show, becoming one of the finalists. Despite not winning first place, which came with a cash prize and a record deal, this experience marked the beginning of Vega's artistic career, and he would later begin his career under the stage name Luis Vega.

Vega's stage name originated in honor of his Argentine friend from The elderly artist, Luis Vega, who, despite being homeless, predicted a brilliant future for him as an artist. After Vega's death, Soliz decided to adopt his name as a tribute to his memory.

=== From TikTok to International Fame ===
Vega began his career performing covers of hits by artists such as Luis Miguel and Carín León, deeply influenced by the ranchera genre and regional Mexican music. Although at first he did not receive contracts and was limited to singing covers at private events, his perspective changed when he began composing songs based on the experiences shared by his followers on TikTok. The starting point was a message from a heartbroken follower, who asked the 29-year-old singer-songwriter for a song that expressed his pain after being left by his wife.

The composition, made in just five minutes, quickly gained popularity on social media and became a viral hit with the song titled "Me va mejor con el alcohol", an answer to the follower he did not know. The song surpassed one million views on YouTube, catapulting Vega to gain more than 14 thousand monthly listeners on Spotify, receiving recognition in Mexico, Paraguay, Chile and Ecuador. Vega wanted to be the voice of impactful stories, inspired by this, he continued writing stories of his followers, giving rise to the song "La niña", based on the story of a Chilean minor with cancer. Despite his busy schedule, Luis always interacts with his followers on social media, who congratulate him and request songs. With pencil, paper, and guitar in hand, he composes songs, turning his phrase "pure paper and pencil" into his emblem.

With the goal of gaining recognition, Vega launched the "Musicalle" initiative, announcing free improvised street concerts through his social media channels. At these spontaneous events, he performed with a speaker and a guitar in public places. During one of these experiences in Cochabamba, he began his concert with around 100 people, but eventually up to 4,000 joined him in the Plaza de las Banderas.

In February 2023, amid his interaction with followers on TikTok, Vega was challenged to compose a song for Grupo Frontera. Although it was his first foray into the cumbia genre, he accepted the challenge. With his characteristic style, Luis Vega shared on paper and pencil the creation process of what would become "Bailando Conmigo." This song became a viral phenomenon, accumulating 22 million views on YouTube. Although the song was never performed with Grupo Frontera, it caught their interest, leading to a meeting between Vega and the group to discuss possible future collaborations. This connection led to Vega joining Grupo Frontera's "El Comienzo" tour as an opening act. Later, to the rhythm of ranchera music and rap, rapper Corona and singer Luis Vega released their musical theme 'Desvelados' on 25 March 2023.

=== Start of international collaborations ===
As part of the 2023 Tour "El Comienzo", Vega had the honor of opening for Grupo Frontera in Chile, on 25 July, at the Movistar Arena. The following day, 26 July, he had his second performance at Luna Park. Then, on 28 July, he did the same in Bolivia, at Estadio Real Santa Cruz. During the event, Vega had the pleasure of singing a duet with Frontera's main vocalist, Adelaido 'Payo' Soliz, who greeted him at center stage while the cheers of the fans echoed throughout the venue. These collaborations strengthened the ties between Luis Vega and Grupo Frontera, giving rise to a friendship that transcended the stage. In addition, Grupo Frontera has been key in introducing Vega to other artists in the industry, generating speculation about possible future musical collaborations between the two parties.

On 14 September, Vega collaborated with former Ráfaga member Rodrigo Tapari to release the remix of his song "Bailando Conmigo". The song, initially conceived as a collaboration with Grupo Frontera earlier this year, took a new direction with Tapari's participation, resulting in a music video that was a resounding success. That same month, during the celebrations of the 213th anniversary of the Gesta Libertaria Cruceña, Vega received the Medal of Municipal Merit, with the mention of Citizen Service in the Municipal Council, in recognition of his outstanding musical talent that has transcended borders with his compositions and performances.

Later, in mid-October of the same year, Vega moved to Mexico where he collaborated with renowned artists such as Rigeo, releasing the song "Modo Romeo", which has already accumulated more than 90 thousand views on YouTube. Furthermore, thanks to his friends from Grupo Frontera, he met the group De Parranda, with whom he released "Filtro".

The year 2023 marked a milestone in Vega's career at the Bolivia Music Awards, where he achieved an impressive record of 10 nominations, thus setting a precedent as the first artist to achieve such a feat in a single awards ceremony, in addition to being the first to win 4 awards in the same edition. These nominations include Song of the Year, Video of the Year, Best Collaboration, and Best International Collaboration. Vega was also nominated and won in the categories of Singer-Songwriter of the Year and Male Artist, as well as the categories of Song of the Year with "Bailando Conmigo" and Best International Collaboration with "Tonta".

In early February 2024, Vega and Javvi Elias presented "Voy a Desaparecer", an emotional song that addresses heartbreak. This song quickly became the most popular in all of Bolivia, reaching number one in YouTube trends and surpassing one million views in less than two weeks. In addition, it managed to enter the Top 100 of Apple Music Bolivia and the Top Virales of Spotify Bolivia, surpassing renowned artists in the industry.

=== Hagamos Historia: From the Streets to Real Santa Cruz ===
In August 2024, Vega revealed that the song "La Foto" (The Photo) was born from a message from a fan who asked him to write a song dedicated to his ex-partner. The song was performed live before its release and, after being posted on social media, quickly went viral, surpassing one million views in less than a day and reaching number one in the trending topics in Bolivia.

That same month, Vega announced at a press conference his debut as a headliner in a stadium, scheduled for 9 November under the title "Hamos Historia" (Let's Make History). He noted that the event represented the fulfillment of a childhood dream and emphasized that the project arose from the support he had received since his first street performances. On the same occasion, he confirmed the participation of more than 15 guest artists, including Américo, Rigeo, De Parranda, and Corona, as well as a space dedicated to emerging musicians.

On 8 November, Vega performed at the Jaime Laredo Open Air Theater in La Paz, as part of the same tour. He performed "Si te vuelvo a ver" with Los Vásquez and Rigeo, and made two songs in collaboration with Américo. Under the same concept, he offered a massive concert on 9 November at the Estadio Real Santa Cruz, accompanied by more than 15 guest artists. The event included a segment dedicated to emerging talents and allocated part of the proceeds to the Davosan Foundation.

After his first concert in a national stadium, Vega continued his international projection with performances on large-scale stages in the region. On 13 December 2024, he was invited by the Chilean duo Los Vásquez to perform at the Movistar Arena in Santiago, as part of the 14th anniversary of his career. Later, on 26 January 2025, he participated in the Villeta 2025 festival in Colombia, where he shared the bill with artists such as Silvestre Dangond, Yeison Jiménez, Luis Alfonso and Pipe Bueno.

In March 2025, Vega collaborated with Bonny Lovy and Corona on the release of the song "Mi Debilidad," a salsa-rhythm piece recorded with the Santa Cruz History Museum as the location for its music video. The song was published on digital platforms and reached 11,000 views on YouTube in its first 12 hours.

In a statement released in May 2025, Vega announced his decision not to attend future award ceremonies in Bolivia, highlighting the need for more transparent processes based on verifiable merit. He questioned the influence of economic factors on some nominations and stated that he considers public support and the organic success of his music to be the main recognition. A few days later, Vega clarified that his criticisms were not directed at any particular event and expressed respect for Diego Alba, creator of the Bolivia Music Awards. In this context, he announced that his team would sponsor the event, with the aim of contributing to its strengthening. He also proposed a voting system based on professionals in the music field, such as producers, managers, journalists, and artists, to ensure a talent-centered evaluation.

In March 2025, Vega and Joseca announced their artistic reconciliation after a period of estrangement that began in 2023. The news was accompanied by the confirmation of a musical collaboration between the two, the result of a process of dialogue and professional reunion. The following month, they announced their artistic reconciliation and presented their first musical collaboration, titled Basura, released on 10 April 2025. The song combined the characteristic styles of both artists: "Modo Cumbia" by Joseca, and "Puro Papel y Lápiz" by Vega.

== Personal life ==
Vega was in a relationship with Nathalia Calvimonte, a television and social media presenter from Santa Cruz, for over four years. In September 2023, the couple announced they were expecting their first child through a social media post. Months later, Tomás was born in Santa Cruz de la Sierra, thus completing a new stage in their family life.

On 9 November 2024, during the Hagamos Historia concert at the Estadio Real Santa Cruz, Vega premiered a song dedicated to Calvimonte, whom he invited on stage. At the end of the performance, he received a ring from an assistant and, in front of the audience, proposed to her. Calvimonte, who was already living with Vega and raising their son together, accepted the proposal on stage, publicly marking the couple's commitment.

The couple married in April 2025. The civil ceremony took place on Tuesday, 22 April, in an intimate ceremony attended by close family members. Days later, on Saturday, 26 April, the religious ceremony took place at Las Arecas estate in Pedro Lorenzo, with approximately 400 guests in attendance. During the celebration, he performed three songs live, including "El Último Amor," the song with which he proposed to her. The evening included musical performances by other artists, a tattoo booth, and the collective creation of a painting signed by those in attendance.

That same month, the two launched the podcast ¿Quién tiene la razón? ("Who's Right?"), which focuses on relationship issues. It was recorded at his residence and aired weekly on Wednesday nights, with no regular guests in its first broadcasts.

== Discography ==
Credits taken from iTunes.

=== Studio albums ===
- 2018: La chica nice

=== Singles ===
- 2021: Hey
- 2022: Me va mejor con el alcohol
- 2022: Enemigo
- 2022: Mi despedida
- 2022: De vez en cuando
- 2022: Ayudame
- 2023: Bailando conmigo
- 2023: Desvelado (ft. Corona)
- 2023: Contacto Cero (ft. David Soliz)
- 2023: Enemigo (ft. Rodrigo Tapari)
- 2023: Modo Romeo (ft. Rigeo)
- 2023: Filtro (ft. De Parranda)
- 2023: Tonta (ft. Dayanara)
- 2024: Voy a desaparecer (ft. Javvi Elias)
- 2024: Ridículo
- 2024: La foto
- 2024: Bailando conmigo (ft. Edwin Gaona)
- 2024: Si te vuelvo a ver (ft. Los Vásquez, Rigeo)
- 2024: El ultimo amor
- 2025: Mundo chiquito (ft. De Parranda)
- 2025: Qué más da (ft. Nico Hernandez)
- 2025: Mi debilidad (ft. Corona, Bonny Lovy)
- 2025: Basura (ft. Joseca)

== Awards and nominations ==
=== Bolivia Music Awards ===
Year	Category	Work	Result	References
2022	Song of the Year	Me va mejor con el alcohol	Nominated	
2022	Singer-songwriter of the Year	Himself	Won	
2022	Composer of the Year	Himself	Nominated	
2022	Best Artist of Bolivia Music's Ranking	Mi despedida	Nominated	
2022	Video of the Year	De vez en cuando	Won	
2022	Male Artist of the Year	Himself	Nominated	
2023	Song of the Year	Contacto Cero	Nominated	
2023	Song of the Year	Bailando conmigo	Won	
2023	Video of the Year	Desvelado	Nominated	
2023	Best Collaboration	Desvelado	Nominated	
2023	Best Collaboration	Contacto Cero	Nominated	
2023	Best International Collaboration	Bailando conmigo	Nominated	
2023	Best International Collaboration	Tonta	Won	
2023	Singer-songwriter of the Year	Himself	Won	
2023	Composer of the Year	Himself	Nominated	
2023	Male Artist of the Year	Himself	Won	
2024	Singer-songwriter of the Year	Himself	Won	
2024	Video of the Year	Ridículo	Won	
2024	Video of the Year	La foto	Nominated	
2024	Video of the Year	Voy a desaparecer	Nominated	
2024	Song of the Year	Voy a desaparecer	Won	
2024	Song of the Year	La foto	Nominated	
2024	Song of the Year	Ridículo	Nominated	
2024	Best Collaboration	Voy a desaparecer	Won	
2024	Best International Collaboration	Si te vuelvo a ver	Nominated	
2024	Best International Collaboration	Filtro	Nominated	
2024	Best International Collaboration	Modo Romeo	Nominated	
2024	Male Artist of the Year	Himself	Won	
