= Chila Jatun =

Bolivian folk music group

- Origin: Cochabamba, Bolivia
- Genres: Andean folk
- Years active: 2005–present
- Members: Gonzalo Hermosa Camacho; Jonathan Hermosa Andresen; Huáscar Hermosa Castro; Ulises Hermosa Fernández; Luis Medrano Hermosa; Branly Yáñez Enríquez; Mario Orellana Olivares; Luis Hinojosa Heredia

Chila Jatun (also written as Ch'ila Jatun, whose translation from Quechua to Spanish means "Little Greats") is a Bolivian folk music group, formed by eight young people from Cochabamba. The founding members of Chila Jatun are Gonzalo Hermosa Camacho (musical director), Jonathan Hermosa Andresen (vocals and ronroco), Huáscar Hermosa Castro (second guitar), Ulises Hermosa Fernández (first guitar), Luis Medrano Hermosa (charango, music producer and sound engineer), Branly Yáñez Enríquez (drums), Mario Orellana Olivares (Andean winds) and Luis Hinojosa Heredia (bass). It is worth noting that five of them are cousins and share not only their youth but also the rich tradition associated with the Hermosa surname, linked to Los Kjarkas.

In 2014, Chila Jatun was awarded the highest distinction awarded by the Plurinational State of Bolivia, the Condor of the Andes in the rank of "Knight", in recognition of their outstanding work. They participated in the fifty-fifth edition of the Viña del Mar International Song Festival.

Chila Jatun has won the category of Best Folk Group for three consecutive years, from 2021 to 2023, at the Bolivia Music Awards. They also stand out with two awards for Best Collaboration in 2022 and 2023, consolidating them as a leading figure in the Bolivian folk music scene.

== History ==
=== Formation and early years ===
The initiative to form the musical group Ch'ila Jatun arose from brothers Benjamín Frontanilla Hermosa and Gonzalo Hermosa when they were between 14 and 15 years old. Initially, they began learning to play the guitar and meeting with the younger brothers, Ulises and Luis Hermosa. Over time, they involved Jhonatan, who was six years old, encouraging him to sing like his father. What began as a game transformed into a true passion for music, thus giving rise to the creation of Ch'ila Jatun. In 2005, the band was officially founded and debuted when they received an invitation to perform for the first time in a concert in Potosí.

=== 2014–2017: Participation in Viña del Mar and first recognitions ===
In 2014, Ch'ila Jatun made their international debut by participating in the Viña del Mar International Song Festival, one of the most prestigious music events in Latin America. Although the group is composed of eight musicians, only five were able to participate due to festival rules. Additionally, they brought nine instruments, including two quenas, four quenachos, a charango, and two guitars. Gonzalo, Jhonatan, Ulises, Huáscar Hermosa, and Luis Medrano Hermosa represented the country in the folklore category, dedicating two hours a day to rehearsing to meet the event's requirements. Their performance in the festival's folklore competition was acclaimed, obtaining the highest score of the night with a 5.82. Despite their successful performance, Ch'ila Jatun did not achieve enough points to break a tie with Chilean singer La Pájara. The tiebreaker was in charge of the jury president, Paloma San Basilio, who opted for the Chilean artist who brought the seagull. This decision was controversial and resulted in a legal appeal being filed in Chile to annul the ruling, although the appeal was unsuccessful. These complaints were joined by Gonzalo Hermosa, a member of Los Kjarkas, suggesting that the competition tended to favor locals each year and questioning the Chilean winner for inaccuracies in her singing.

Despite the negative result at the Viña del Mar Festival, President Evo Morales, paid tribute to the group Ch'ila Jatun by awarding them the Cóndor de los Andes in the rank of "Knight" and the "Nilo Soruco" medal for cultural merit. During the ceremony held at the Casa Grande del Pueblo, Morales described the second place that Chila Jatun achieved this, stating: "According to my interpretation, they have won, we have won, unfortunately they have robbed us." In addition, the municipality of Cochabamba awarded them the highest distinction "Sun of September", Quillacollo a decoration for merit, Sacaba a recognition plaque; the Assemblymen's Brigade a diploma and the Governor's Office the medal for artistic merit. Culminating a year full of successes, they released their album titled "Rompiendo Fronteras", which incorporates the songs highlighted during their performance in Viña del Mar. In addition, they presented a video clip filmed in Tarabuco, Bolivia, to the beat of Pujllay, a traditional dance of the region.

In May 2015, together with Los Kjarkas, Chila Jatun were the main acts at the first Megaencuentro de Fraternidades in Buenos Aires, Argentina. The event took place at Quilmes Stadium and all 25,000 tickets were sold out.

In early 2016, the group announced a European tour, which included six concerts in different cities across the continent, including France, Italy, Palma de Mallorca, Madrid, and Barcelona, between 19 April and 4 May.

=== 2018–2021: Second appearance in Viña del Mar ===
In 2018, Ch’ila Jatun performed “Devoto de Corazón,” the official song for the festival of the Virgin of Urkupiña, an important religious event in Bolivia. The song was presented in a caporal rhythm. At the end of that year, Huáscar Hermosa announced his solo career. In an attempt to show a more intimate side of his art, he released his first music video, 'De a poquito amor', on social media. Although he decided to pursue a solo career, Huáscar maintained his participation in the band Chila Jatun and, to this day, remains an active member of the group.

Despite the controversy of 2014, Ch'ila Jatun was selected to represent Bolivia at the 2019 Viña del Mar Festival. In their first performance, they performed the song "Me cansé de amarte" (I'm tired of loving you), but they failed to convince the jury, obtaining the lowest average of the night, a 5.5. However, in their second performance at the festival, Ch'ila Jatun managed to improve their average. Although they made a notable effort, the band finished in fourth place out of six invited countries and concluded their participation in the Festival.

At the beginning of 2021, Ch'ila Jatun announced an international tour called "Ojitos de Luna", which began with two concerts in São Paulo, Brazil, on 23 and 24 January. Later, the group performed in Ecuador, Chile and Peru.

=== 2022–present: 15th Anniversary and international tours with Los Kjarkas ===
Under the title "La Historia Continúa", Los Kjarkas and Ch'ila Jatun joined their talents in a joint show at the Movistar Arena in Buenos Aires, Argentina, during September 2022. In this event, parents and children shared the stage, offering thousands of spectators the best of their musical repertoire. The Argentine tour included performances at the Laferrere sports center, in Ciudad Evita, and at the Gigante club, in La Plata. They then continued their tour through Chile, Peru, Ecuador, and Colombia.

Later, on 9 October 2022, Chila Jatun released the song "Volvió a Latir" in collaboration with Milena Warthon, reaching number 1 in YouTube trends in Peru and Bolivia. The song reached the top spots in Latin America, surpassing 360,000 views on YouTube in less than 24 hours.

In February 2023, Ch'ila Jatun was awarded the "Heroína Juana Azurduy de Padilla" medal in the Civic Honor category by the Sucre Municipal Council. This distinction was awarded in recognition of their contribution to the dissemination and promotion of the cultural wealth of the Potolo community, in District 8 of Sucre, through the release of the video clip for the song "Morenita Vanidosa."

To celebrate the band's 15th anniversary, Ch'ila Jatun performed a concert in Lima called "La Fiesta de Colores" at the Coliseo Eduardo Dibós. The event, which took place in June 2023, featured several guest artists, including Élmer Hermosa, lead singer of Los Kjarkas.

In September 2023, Chila Jatun, Bonny Lovy, Lu de la Tower, and Luciel Izumi joined forces to release the song "Juntos Sonamos Más Fuerte." This musical theme highlights the diversity of Bolivia and fuses cumbia and salay, emblematic genres of the country.

== Discography ==
- 2010: K'anchay
- 2014: Rompiendo Fronteras
- 2016: Justicia para vivir
- 2017: Soy de las Montañas
- 2019: Lo mejor

== Awards and nominations ==
=== Bolivia Music Awards ===
Year	Category	Work	Result	Ref.
2021	Best Folk Group	Themselves	Won	
2022	Best Collaboration	Te quiero amor	Won	
2022	Best Folk Group	Themselves	Won	
2023	Best Collaboration	Juntos Sonamos Más Fuerte	Won	
2023	Duo / Group of the Year	Themselves	Nominated	
2023	Best Folk Group	Themselves	Won	

=== Viña del Mar International Song Festival ===
Year	Category	Work	Result	Ref.
2014	Folk contest	Boquita de miel	Finalist	
2019	Folk contest	Me cansé de amarte	Semifinalist	
