= Bonny Lovy =

Bolivian singer-songwriter (born 1991)

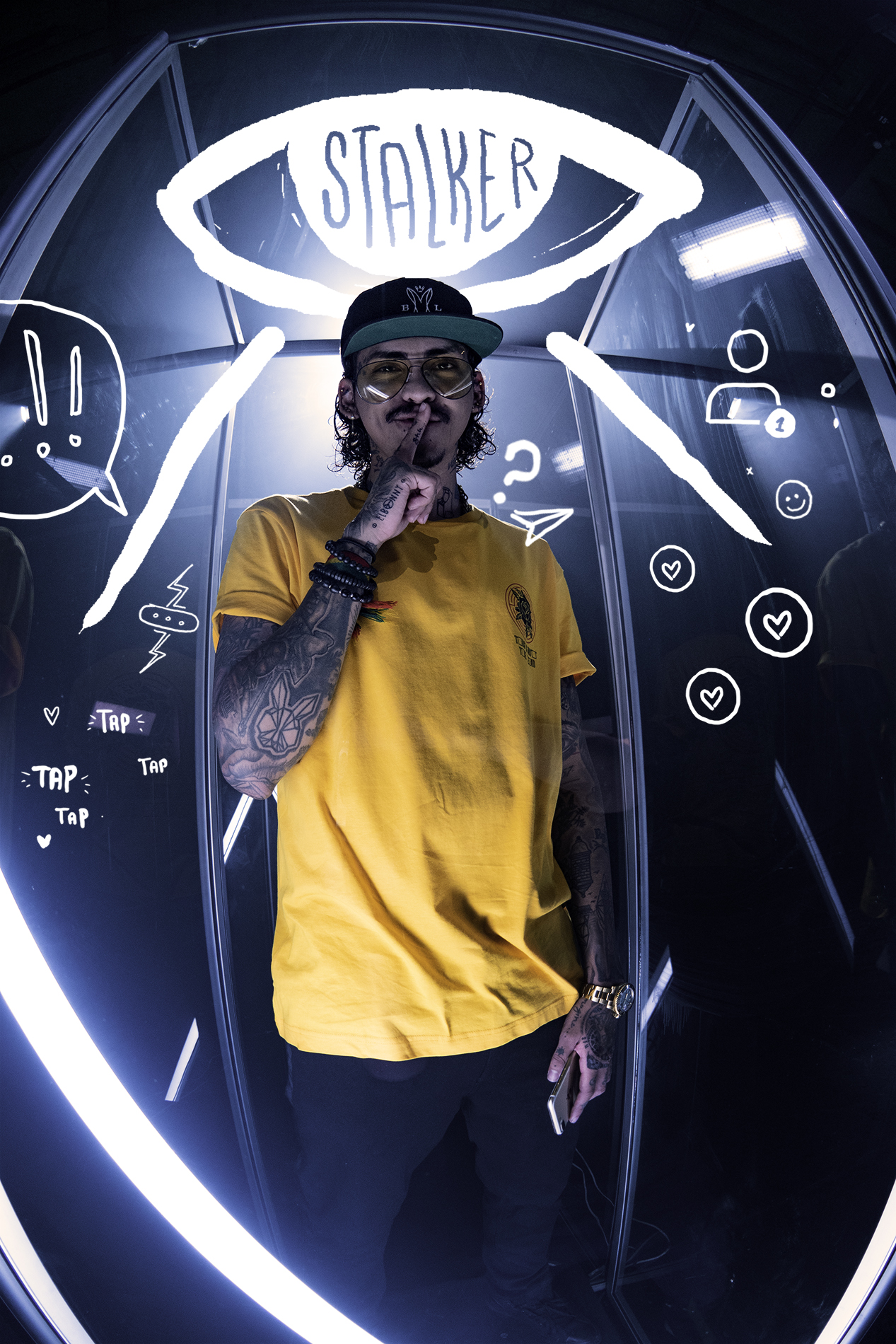
- Bonny Lovy in 2018

Background information
- Birth name: Oscar Mario Paz Hurtado
- Also known as: El productor que canta
- Born: 27 August 1991 (age 33); Santa Cruz de la Sierra, Bolivia
- Genres: Reggaeton; Latin pop; R&B
- Occupations: Singer; songwriter
- Instrument: Vocals
- Years active: 2011–present
- Labels: Warner Music Argentina (2022-present)

Oscar Mario Paz Hurtado (born 27 August 1991), known professionally as Bonny Lovy, is a Bolivian singer, songwriter, sound engineer and record producer. His music combines genres such as reggaeton, pop, and R&B, and has won over millions of fans around the world.

Lovy is the Bolivian artist with the most plays on digital platforms such as YouTube and Spotify. His most popular song is "Cumbia boliviana", which features the collaboration of the young charanguista Luciel Izumi, and which was number one in the music trends on Apple Music, Spotify, and Deezer.

Lovy has been recognized as "Male Artist of the Year" at the Bolivia Music Awards for two consecutive years, from 2021 to 2022. Additionally, his hits, such as "La cumbia Boliviana" in 2021 and "Loco de Jhoel" in 2022, were distinguished as the best song in their respective years.

== Early life ==
From a young age, Paz showed an interest in music and learned to play several instruments with the help of his uncle Roger, a music producer. At the age of nine, he recorded his first album, "Un rayo de esperanza," featuring religious songs. At the age of eleven, he participated in the children's program Unitoons, where he gained popularity and toured Bolivia and other countries several times.

== Career ==
Paz adopted the name Bonny Lovy and released his first solo single, "Hola qué tal," in 2011. He then released several hits such as "Muchachita," "Enamorado," "Insomnio," and "La cumbia boliviana," which have reached millions of views on digital platforms such as YouTube and Spotify.

On 25 May 2018, Lovy and the urban pop band Alkilados released the song "Tu mamá" in reggaeton rhythm, material they had been preparing since March. This collaboration was born from the friendship between the artists, which was consolidated at the Heat Festival (HTV) in Peru, the previous year. Later, on 30 August, they reached first place on the HTV Hot ranking, which represented a significant achievement in the Latin music scene, considering the relevance and influence of this count at a continental level.

On 29 October 2021, Lovy received recognition from the Plurinational Legislative Assembly for his contribution to Bolivian music and for showcasing the country's cultural diversity. The recognition was presented by Deputy María Pachacute, member of the Commission on Indigenous Peoples, Cultures and Interculturality of the Chamber of Deputies. That same year, among the more than 100 artists nominated for the "Bolivia Music Awards", Lovy stood out as the best male artist of the year, while Bolivian cumbia was the song with the most votes by the public.

In 2022, Lovy was the most listened to Bolivian in the country and also sealed his incorporation into Warner Music Argentina, after signing a contract with the executives of that record company. On the occasion of the 197th anniversary of Bolivia's independence, in August 2022, Lovy presented the video clip of his version of "Viva mi patria Bolivia", a patriotic song by Apolinar Camacho. The video showed the singer in different emblematic places in Santa Cruz and La Paz, as well as the cultural diversity of Bolivia. The artist Luciel Izumi collaborated with Bonny Lovy in this musical production. The song retained the cueca as its main rhythm, but incorporated new instruments, such as the charango, which gave it a different touch.

At the end of 2022, Lovy announced his European tour, which he called "EuroTour 2023 By Bonny Lovy". The artist visited the cities of Valencia, Murcia, Bilbao, Madrid and Barcelona in Spain; Geneva in Switzerland; and Milan and Bergamo in Italy. The objective of his tour was to promote his music and showcase the cultural diversity of Bolivia. In September 2023, Lovy, Chila Jatun, Lu de la Tower and Luciel Izumi collaborated to release the song "Juntos Sonamos Más Fuerte", a melody that highlights the diversity of Bolivia and is a blend of cumbia and salay, characteristic genres of Bolivia.

In March 2025, Lovy joined forces with Luis Vega and Corona to present "Mi Debilidad", a song in salsa rhythm that was recorded with the Santa Cruz History Museum as the setting for the music video. The song was published on digital platforms and registered 11,000 views on YouTube in its first 12 hours.

== Controversies ==
In 2020, Lovy launched a line of eco-friendly notebooks featuring his image and song lyrics, in collaboration with the state-owned company Papelbol. However, in 2021, a councilwoman reported that one of the phrases printed on the notebooks was sexist and violent, saying: "Oh, that little girl, when I see her walk, she passes by my house, and I, who am a threat, will see what happens." The phrase is from the song "Muchachita," which Lovy published in 2015. Papelbol defended itself, saying that the text was not intended to incite violence and that the material had been well received by young people.

In 2021, the Movimiento al Socialismo (MAS), the political party that won the presidential elections in Bolivia, refused to allow the Chamber of Deputies to pay tribute to Lovy for his artistic career. The reason for the refusal was that he had supported the transitional government of Jeanine Áñez in 2020 and had appeared in photographs with her and her daughter Carolina Ribera to raise awareness about the pandemic. Representative Gualberto Arispe, a representative of the MAS, called him a "coup plotter" and said he did not deserve the recognition. However, the opposition to the MAS managed to secure the necessary votes to approve the tribute and recognize Lovy's work as a Bolivian artist.

In 2022, Lovy generated controversy with a video on his social media, in which he previewed his upcoming song "Loco de remate." In the video, he and his friends were seen drinking alcohol and singing lyrics about heartbreak, with insults and obscene gestures. Lovy explained that alcohol was part of the song's production and that he wanted to capture the real voices of his friends. The video had thousands of views and comments, some critical and others favorable.

== Discography ==
Credits taken from iTunes.

=== Singles ===
- Reina de París (2011)
- Desde que la vi (2015)
- Pamela (2015)
- Enamorado (2016)
- Que No que Na (2016)
- Quién Será (2016)
- Muchachita (2016)
- Ando (2016)
- Noche en Hawaii (feat. Mike Bahía) (2017)
- No es Negocio (feat. Japiaguar) (2017)
- Dura (2018)
- Tu mamá (2018)
- Ella me persigue (feat. Alkilados) (2018)
- Insomnio (feat. Danny Paz) (2019)
- Baby (feat. Jorsh) (2020)
- Juguete (2020)
- Pinche Party (2020)
- Alegría (feat. Víctor Cardenas) (2020)
- Pa Bailar (2020)
- Perdido (feat. Danny Paz) (2021)
- La Cumbia Boliviana (feat. Luciel Izumi) (2021)
- Loco de Remate (2022)
- Palomitay (2022)
- Viva Mi Patria Bolivia (2022)
- Juntos Sonamos Más Fuertes (feat. Chila Jatun, Lu de la Tower and Luciel Izumi) (2023)
- Tu Gallito (2024)
- Se va al mundial (2024)
- ¡Que Viva La Vida! (2024)
- Club Deportivo San Antonio de Bulo Bulo (2024)
- Otra Noche (feat. Yarit) (2024)
- Bonny Loko (2024)
- Sufro (feat. Corona) (2024)
- Insomnio (feat. Danny Paz) (2025)
- My Lova (feat. Flavia Laos) (2025)
- Mi Debilidad (feat. Luis Vega and Corona) (2025)
- Pica, Pica (Remix) (feat. Amor Sagrado and Grupo La Pantera) (2025)

== Awards and nominations ==
=== Bolivia Music Awards ===
Year	Category	Work	Result	Ref.
2021	Song of the Year	La Cumbia Boliviana	Won	
2021	Video of the Year	La Cumbia Boliviana	Nominated	
2021	Best International Collaboration	Amor Amor	Nominated	
2021	Best Urban Artist (male)	Himself	Nominated	
2021	Male Artist of the Year	Himself	Won	
2022	Re-release of the Year	Viva mi patria Bolivia	Nominated	
2022	Song of the Year	Loco de Remate	Won	
2022	Video of the Year	Loco de Remate	Nominated	
2022	Best Urban Artist (male)	Himself	Nominated	
2022	Male Artist of the Year	Himself	Won	
2023	Video of the Year	Tu Gallito	Nominated	
2023	Best Pop Artist	Himself	Nominated	
2023	Best Urban Artist (male)	Himself	Won	
2023	Best Collaboration	Tu Gallito	Nominated	
2023	Best Collaboration	Juntos Sonamos Más Fuerte	Won	
2023	Male Artist of the Year	Himself	Nominated	
2024	Best Urban Artist (male)	Himself	Nominated	
2024	Male Artist of the Year	Himself	Nominated	

=== Premios Núcleo Urbano ===
Year	Category	Work	Result	Ref.
2016	Social Media Artist	Himself	Won	
2016	New International Artist	Himself	Won	
2017	Social Media Artist	Himself	Nominated	
