= Gladys Moreno =

Bolivian singer

- Born: November 28, 1933; Santa Cruz de la Sierra
- Origin: Bolivia
- Died: February 3, 2005 (aged 71) Santa Cruz de la Sierra
- Genres: Chovenas, taquiraris
- Occupation: Singer

Gladys Moreno Cuéllar (Santa Cruz de la Sierra, November 28, 1933 – February 3, 2005), also Gladis Moreno Cuellar, was a Bolivian singer.

She made her radio debut at age 15 in 1948 on Radio Electra. In 1962, she was named "Ambassador of the Bolivian Song" by the government of Víctor Paz Estenssoro. She also later received the designation of "Condor de los Andes". Her most popular song was the taquirari, "Viva Santa Cruz."

She was married in 1964 to Alfredo Tomelic, and they had a daughter Ana Carola. In 1977, she toured the United States.

She died from a heart attack in 2005.

In 2014, Bolivian president Evo Morales dedicated a life-size bronze statue of Moreno in Santa Cruz, Bolivia. the statue was titled "La Novia del Viento".

== Discography ==
- "La Voz Del Oriente Boliviano" (Lauro Records, 1961)
- "Embajadora De La Cancion" (Lyra, 1968)
- "La Embajadora De La Canción Vol. II (Lyra, 1979)
- "El Disco De Oro De Gladys Moreno" (Lyra, 1987)
