= Bolivia Music Awards =

Annual music award in Bolivia

- Awarded for: Talent of Bolivian artists
- Sponsored by: Bolivia Music

The Bolivia Music Awards are an annual awards ceremony to recognise and reward exceptional talent in Bolivia's music industry. There are 30 award categories, ranging from Best New Artist to Best Musical Producer. The winners of the awards are determined by a combination of an online vote on Bolivia Music's webpage and an evaluation by a panel of music industry experts from within Bolivia and from abroad. The 2023 ceremony took place at the Hard Rock Cafe in Santa Cruz de la Sierra.

== Categories ==
The Bolivia Music Awards originally had 22 categories. However, 8 categories were added in 2023, resulting in a total of 30.

- Artists
  - Best New Artist
  - Breakthrough Artist
  - Best Foreign Artist
  - Best Pop Artist
  - Best Urban Artist (female)
  - Best Urban Artist (male)
  - Best Christian Artist
  - Manager of the Year
  - Best Electronic Artist
  - Composer of the Year / Singer-songwriter of the Year
  - Male Artist of the Year
  - Female Artist of the Year
  - International Artist of the Year
  - Best Artist of Bolivia Music's Ranking
  - Best New Group
  - Best Rock Group
  - Best Folk Group
  - Duo / Group of the Year
- Songs
  - Album of the Year
  - Re-release of the Year
  - Best Collaboration
  - Best International Collaboration
  - Video of the Year
  - Song of the Year
- Production
  - Best Video Director
  - Best Record Label
  - Best Music Producer
- Recognition
  - Best Record Label
  - Emblematic Artist of the Year
  - Recognition of Lifetime Achievement

== Controversy ==
In May 2025, the artist Drop-D publicly denounced the Bolivia Music Awards organisation after they requested a payment of 350 dollars to attend the ceremony as an award-winning artist. The denunciation had various reactions, and opened a conversation about the transparency and the event's recognition criteria.

After the denunciation, Luis Vega, who had won 11 previous awards, announced that he would no longer attend future awards in Bolivia, pointing out the need for more transparency and for recognition based on verifiable merit. Later, Lu de la Tower, another award-winner, also expressed her disagreement with the existence of fees to emerging artists, and communicated her disengagement with the organisation, affirming that during her previous experiences, she was never subjected to these types of requests.

Amidst this public backlash, Diego Alba, the event's founder, clarified that the payments corresponded to optional participation packets, and were not a requirement to receive the award.

Luis Vega later clarified that his critiques were not directed at a specific event and expressed respect to Diego Alba's work. He announced that his team would sponsor the Bolivia Music Awards and proposed a system of voting based on professionals in the field of music.
