= Revelation Pt. 2 – The Fruit of Life =

The Fruit of Life (Revelation Pt. II)

Studio album by Stephen Marley
- Released: July 22, 2016
- Genre: Reggae
- Length: 1:18:07
- Label: Ghetto Youths International
- Producer: Stephen Marley

Stephen Marley chronology
Revelation Pt. 1 – The Root of Life (2011)	The Fruit of Life (Revelation Pt. II) (2016)	Old Soul (2023)

The Fruit of Life (Revelation Pt. II) is the third studio album by Jamaican-American musician Stephen Marley. It was released on 22 July 2016 via Ghetto Youths International. Produced by Stephen Marley himself, it features guest appearances from Damian Marley, Waka Flocka Flame, Black Thought, Bounty Killer, Busta Rhymes, Capleton, Dead Prez, Iggy Azalea, Jasmin Karma, Jo Mersa Marley, Junior Reid, Kardinal Offishall, Konshens, Ky-Mani Marley, Mad Cobra, Pain Killer, Pitbull, Rakim, Rick Ross, Shaggy, Sizzla, Twista, Wyclef Jean and DJ Khaled.

In the United States, the album peaked at number 129 on the Billboard 200, number 10 on the Independent Albums and atop of the Reggae Albums. It also made it to the number 69 on the Swiss Hitparade.

== Critical reception ==
Professional ratings
Aggregate scores
Source	Rating
Metacritic	77/100
Review scores
Source	Rating
AllMusic	4/5 stars
The Independent	3/5 stars
The Times	2/5 stars

Revelation, Pt. 2: The Fruit of Life was met with generally favourable reviews from music critics. At Metacritic, which assigns a normalized rating out of 100 to reviews from mainstream publications, the album received an average score of 77, based on four reviews.

AllMusic's David Jeffries praised the album, saying "Stephen's production is compelling, elaborate, daring, and yet tasteful throughout, while his lyrics -- like his brother Damian's -- offer plenty to savor once all the sonic brilliance has sunk in", he continued, "file this massive effort next to Damian's Welcome to Jamrock, Stephen's own diverse 2007 release Mind Control, and maybe even Dad's 1976 "Roots, Rock, Reggae" breakthrough, Rastaman Vibration".

In the mixed reviews, Andy Gill of The Independent stated: "the album only develops a steely ragga rasp in the last few tracks, when the hometown likes of Bounty Killer, Capleton and Sizzla make their presence felt".

== Track listing ==
No.	Title	Length
1.	"Intro"	1:49
2.	"Babylon" (featuring Junior Reid and dead prez)	4:21
3.	"Revelation Party" (featuring Jo Mersa Marley)	4:21
4.	"So Unjust" (featuring Rakim and Kardinal Offishall)	4:09
5.	"Walking Away"	4:32
6.	"The Lion Roars" (featuring Rick Ross and Ky-Mani Marley)	5:10
7.	"Scars on My Feet" (featuring Waka Flocka Flame)	3:34
8.	"Pleasure or Pain" (featuring Busta Rhymes and Konshens)	4:05
9.	"Perfect Picture" (featuring Damian Marley)	5:19
10.	"Father of the Man" (featuring Wyclef Jean)	4:49
11.	"Music Is Alive" (featuring Pain Killer and Damian Marley)	3:33
12.	"So Strong" (featuring Shaggy)	4:23
13.	"Thorn or a Rose" (featuring Black Thought)	4:12
14.	"Paradise" (featuring Twista and Jasmin Karma)	3:25
15.	"Tonight (It's a Party)" (featuring DJ Khaled, Waka Flocka Flame and Iggy Azalea)	4:09
16.	"Ghetto Boy" (featuring Bounty Killer and Mad Cobra)	4:05
17.	"Rock Stone" (featuring Capleton and Sizzla)	4:37
18.	"When She Dances" (featuring Pitbull)	3:59
19.	"It's Alright"	3:35
Total length:		1:18:07

== Charts ==
Chart (2016)	Peak position
Swiss Albums (Schweizer Hitparade)	69
UK Independent Albums (OCC)	24
UK Independent Album Breakers Chart (OCC)	3
US Billboard 200	129
US Independent Albums (Billboard)	10
US Reggae Albums (Billboard)	1
