= Revelation Pt. 1 – The Root of Life =

Studio album by Stephen Marley
- Released: May 24, 2011
- Studio: Circle House Studios (Miami, FL); Lion's Den Studios (Miami, FL); Tuff Gong Studios (Jamaica); Dunham Sound Studios (New York)
- Genre: Reggae
- Length: 1:01:30
- Label: Ghetto Youths United; Tuff Gong; Universal Republic
- Producer: Stephen Marley

Stephen Marley chronology
Mind Control (2007)	Revelation Pt. 1 – The Root of Life (2011)	Revelation Pt. 2 – The Fruit of Life (2016)

Professional ratings
Review scores
Source	Rating
AllMusic	3.5/5 stars
Now	3/5 Ns

Revelation Part 1: The Root of Life is the second studio album by Jamaican-American musician Stephen Marley. It was released on May 24, 2011 via Ghetto Youths United/Tuff Gong/Universal Republic Records. Recording sessions took place at Circle House Studios and Lion's Den Studios in Miami, Tuff Gong Studios in Jamaica, and Dunham Sound Studios in New York. Produced by Marley himself with co-producers Paul Fakhourie and Llamar Brown, it features guest appearances from Damian Marley, Buju Banton, Capleton, Melanie Fiona, Spragga Benz, Wale, Ziggy Marley and the cast of Fela!.

In the United States, the album peaked at number 92 on the Billboard 200, number 20 on the Top R&B/Hip-Hop Albums and atop of the Reggae Albums. It also made it to the number 73 on the Swiss Hitparade. At the 54th Annual Grammy Awards held on February 12, 2012, the album won a Grammy Award for Best Reggae Album.

As of June 2016, the album has sold 46,000 copies in the US. The album's sequel titled Revelation Pt. 2 – The Fruit of Life was released in 2016.

== Track listing ==
No.	Title	Writer(s)	Producer(s)	Length
1.	"Made in Africa" (featuring Wale and the cast of Fela!)	Stephen Marley; Olubowale Victor Akintimehin; Carlton Grant	Stephen Marley; Paul Fakhourie (co.); Llamar Brown (co.)	5:37
2.	"False Friends"	S. Marley; Desmond Smith; Andrew "Illestr8" Forrest	Stephen Marley; Paul Fakhourie (co.)	3:24
3.	"Break Us Apart" (featuring Capleton)	S. Marley; Clifton Bailey	Stephen Marley; Paul Fakhourie (co.)	3:45
4.	"Can't Keep I Down"	S. Marley; Smith	Stephen Marley; Paul Fakhourie (co.)	3:19
5.	"No Cigarette Smoking (In My Room)" (featuring Melanie Fiona)	S. Marley; Melanie Fiona Hallim; Smith	Stephen Marley; Paul Fakhourie (co.)	3:41
6.	"Freedom Time"	Bob Marley	Stephen Marley; Paul Fakhourie (co.)	3:21
7.	"Jah Army" (featuring Jr. Gong and Buju Banton)	S. Marley; Damian Marley; Mark Myrie; Michael Rose	Stephen Marley	4:44
8.	"Old Slaves"	S. Marley	Stephen Marley; Paul Fakhourie (co.)	6:26
9.	"Pale Moonlight (How Many Times)"	Bob Marley	Stephen Marley; Paul Fakhourie (co.)	3:25
10.	"She Knows Now"	S. Marley; Smith	Stephen Marley; Paul Fakhourie (co.); Llamar Brown (co.)	5:21
11.	"Selassie Is the Chapel" (featuring Ziggy Marley)	Bob Marley	Stephen Marley; Paul Fakhourie (co.)	4:54
12.	"Tight Ship" (featuring Jr. Gong)	S. Marley; D. Marley; Smith	Stephen Marley; Paul Fakhourie (co.)	4:15
13.	"Working Days" (featuring Spragga Benz)	S. Marley; Smith; Grant	Stephen Marley; Paul Fakhourie (co.)	5:07
14.	"Now I Know"	S. Marley; Richard Booker	Stephen Marley	4:11
Total length:				1:01:30

Sample credits

- Track 7 contains a sample of the composition "General Penitentiary", written by Michael Rose and performed by Black Uhuru.

== Charts ==
Chart (2011)	Peak position
Swiss Albums (Schweizer Hitparade)	73
US Billboard 200	92
US Top R&B/Hip-Hop Albums (Billboard)	20
US Reggae Albums (Billboard)	1
