= Still Blazin =

Studio album by Capleton
- Released: February 26, 2002 (U.S.)
- Genre: Dancehall, reggae
- Length: 65:17
- Label: VP
- Producer: Joel Chin (executive); Herbie Miller; Clifton Bailey; Paul Shields

Capleton chronology
More Fire (2000)	Still Blazin (2002)	Voice of Jamaica, Vol.3 (2003)

Professional ratings
Review scores
Source	Rating
AllMusic	3/5 stars
Entertainment Weekly	B
Vibe	4/5 stars

Still Blazin is reggae, dancehall artist Capleton's eighth studio album. It was released on February 26, 2002. The album is a mix of dancehall and reggae.

== Track listing ==
#	Title	Producer(s)	Composer(s)	Featured Performer(s)	Time
1	"Search Fi a Find"	C. Roach, Clifton Bailey, Norman "Bull Pus" Bryan	Bailey, C/DOrazio, G.		4:49
2	"Behold"	Morgan Heritage	Bailey, C/Heritage, M	Morgan Heritage	4:13
3	"Mashing Up the Earth"	Norman "Bull Pus" Bryan	Bryan, N/Holeness, N/Bailey, C		4:50
4	"I Will Survive"	Michael Johnson	Bailey, C/Johnson, M		3:51
5	"Whoa (New Way)"	King Jammy, Ward 21	Grey, A./McCarthy, K./Bailey, C./James, Lloyd/Crossdale, Paul "Wrong Move"		3:18
6	"Punchline 2 Hit"	Michael Johnson	Bailey, C/Johnson, M		3:18
7	"Caan Tan Yah"	Desmond*, Rupert Blake	Browne, C./Bailey, C./Johnson, W		3:40
8	"Hail King Selassie"	Louis "Flabba" Malcolm	Malcome, L/Myrie, R/Bailey, C	Luciano	3:48
9	"Cooyah Cooyah"	Philip "Fatis" Burrell	Bailey, Clifton		3:57
10	"Pure Woman"	C. Roach, Clifton Bailey, Norman "Bull Pus" Bryan	Bailey, C		3:45
11	"Boom Sound"	Paul 'Computer Paul' Henton*	Dood, C./Bailey, C.		4:02
12	"How It Ago"	Cleveland "Cleve" Brown*, Wycliffe "Steely" Johnson	Brown, C/Bailey, C/Johnson, W		3:43
13	"Guerilla Warfare"	Paul 'Jazzwad' Yebuah	Yebuah, P/Bailey, C		3:34
14	"Red, Red, Red"	Desmond*, Rupert Blake	Williams, M/Bailey, C		3:48
15	"In Your Eyes"	C. Roach, Clifton Bailey, Norman "Bull Pus" Bryan	Bailey, C		3:19
16	"Mi Deh Yah"	Philip "Fatis" Burrell	Bailey, Clifton		4:09
17	"Jah Is Gonna Work It Out"	Collin "Bulby" York, Lynford "Fatta" Marshall	Bailey, C/James, Lloyd	Glen Washington	4:08
18	"I & I Chant"	Collin "Bulby" York, Lynford "Fatta" Marshall	Bailey, C/James, Lloyd		3:19
19	"Gimme the Woman" (bonus track)	Bobby 'Digital' Dixon	Bailey, C./Dixon, B		3:37
