= Rise Them Up =

Studio album by Capleton
- Released: May 15, 2007(U.S.)
- Recorded: 2006
- Genre: Reggae
- Length: 79:18
- Label: Penitentiary Records, Rude Boy
- Producer: Clifton Bailey (executive); Trevor Sinclair

Capleton chronology
Free Up (2006)	Rise Them Up (2007)	Bun Friend (2008)

Rise Them Up is an album by reggae, dancehall artist Capleton. It is his fifteenth studio album and was released on May 15, 2007 by Penitentiary Records.

== Track listing ==
#	Title	Producer(s)	Composer(s)	Featured Performer(s)	Time
1	"Jah Jah Lives"	Trevor Sinclair	Bailey, C. "Capleton"		3:01
2	"Hidden Secrets"	Trevor Sinclair	Bailey, C. "Capleton"		3:42
3	"Who Dem"	Trevor Sinclair	Bailey, C. "Capleton"		3:18
4	"Why Worry"	Trevor Sinclair	Bailey, C. "Capleton"		3:15
5	"Rise Them Up"	Trevor Sinclair	Bailey, C. "Capleton"		1:30
6	"Gimmi Little"	Trevor Sinclair	Bailey, C. "Capleton"		3:18
7	"Hands Up"	Trevor Sinclair	Bailey, C. "Capleton"		3:27
8	"Fool"	Trevor Sinclair	Bailey, C. "Capleton"		3:02
9	"Get Us Out"	Trevor Sinclair	Bailey, C. "Capleton"		1:22
10	"Dem Doom"	Bost & Bim for Special delivery music	Bost & Bim		4:10
11	"Sell Out"	Trevor Sinclair	Bailey, C. "Capleton"		3:41
12	"Spread the Love"	Trevor Sinclair	Bailey, C. "Capleton"		4:06
13	"Can't Stop This"	Trevor Sinclair	Bailey, C. "Capleton"		3:09
14	"Loving You"	Trevor Sinclair	Bailey, C. "Capleton"		2:47
15	"Do Them So"	Trevor Sinclair	Bailey, C. "Capleton"		3:28
