= Strictly Roots =

Studio album by Morgan Heritage
- Released: March 31, 2015
- Genre: Reggae
- Length: 47:17
- Label: CTBC Music Group

Morgan Heritage chronology
Here Come the King (2013)	Strictly Roots (2015)

Strictly Roots is an album by Jamaican reggae group Morgan Heritage released on March 31, 2015. It earned the group a Grammy Award for Best Reggae Album. The album topped the Top Reggae Albums chart both in 2015 and 2016.

It features several guest appearances by Chronixx, Stephen Marley's son Jo Mersa Marley, Gil Sharone, Jemere Morgan, Eric Rachmany, J Boog, and the bassist vocalist of the Soldiers of Jah Army Bobby Lee Jefferson. The songs "Rise And Fall" and "Wanna Be Loved" were written by French reggae band Bost & Bim.

== Track listing ==
1. "Strictly Roots" - 3:41
2. "Child Of JAH" (featuring Chronixx) - 4:13
3. "Light It Up" (featuring Jo Mersa Marley) - 4:15
4. "Rise And Fall" - 4:06
5. "Perform And Done" - 3:48
6. "So Amazing" (featuring Gil Sharone, J Boog, Jemere Morgan) - 4:00
7. "Wanna Be Loved" (featuring Eric Rachmany) - 4:14
8. "Why Dem Come Around" - 3:16
9. "We Are Warriors" (featuring Bobby Lee Jefferson) - 3:38
10. "Put It On Me" - 3:45
11. "Sunday Morning" - 3:57
12. "Celebrate Life" - 4:21

== Charts ==
Chart (2015)	Peak position
US Top Reggae Albums	1
