= Praises to the King =

Studio album by Capleton
- Released: January 1, 2003 (U.S.)
- Recorded: 2002
- Genre: Reggae
- Length: 79:18
- Label: Black Scorpio
- Producer: Clifton Bailey (executive); Maurice Johnson

Capleton chronology
Voice of Jamaica, Vol.3 (2003)	Praises to the King (2003)	The People Dem (2004)

Praises to the King is reggae - dancehall's artist Capleton, eleventh studio album. It was released on January 1, 2003. The album features guest appearances from Gentleman, Luciano, Bobbi Zarro and Josie Mel.

== Track listing ==
#	Title	Producer(s)	Composer(s)	Featured Performer(s)	Time
1	"Righteousness"	Trevor Sinclair	Bailey, C. "Capleton"		4:01
2	"Praises to the King"	Mark Hudson	Bailey, C. "Capleton"		3:39
3	"Fire Ago Bun Dem"	Shane Richards	Bailey, C. "Capleton"	Gentleman	3:57
4	"Right Now"	Norman "Bull Pus" Bryan	Bailey, C. "Capleton"		3:44
5	"Never Want the Youths to Die"	Steve Ventura	Bailey, C. "Capleton"	Luciano	3:52
6	"Gwaan Fight Dem"	Delroy "Delly Ranx" Foster	Bailey, C. "Capleton"		4:06
7	"Seek Salvation"	Trevor Sinclair	Bailey, C. "Capleton"		3:56
8	"My Sound"	Garfield Hamilton	Bailey, C. "Capleton"		3:57
9	"Cold Blooded Murderer"	Trevor Sinclair	Bailey, C. "Capleton"		3:55
10	"Love the Ghetto Youths"	Troy McLean	Bailey, C. "Capleton"		3:45
11	"Some Body"	Trevor Sinclair	Bailey, C. "Capleton"		3:19
12	"Gun Hark "	Delroy "Delly Ranx" Foster	Bailey, C. "Capleton"	Bobbie Zarro	3:49
13	"Ghetto Youth Fi Big"	Delroy "Delly Ranx" Foster	Bailey, C. "Capleton"	Josie Mel	3:46
