= Old Soul (album) =

Studio album by Stephen Marley
- Released: September 15, 2023
- Studio: Stephen Marley's home studio
- Genre: Reggae; Soul; Blues; Alternative
- Length: 59:25
- Label: Ghetto Youths International

Stephen Marley chronology
'Revelation Pt. 2 – The Fruit of Life' (2016)	Old Soul (2023)

Old Soul is the fourth studio album by Jamaican-American musician Stephen Marley. It was released on September 15, 2023.

== Background ==
The lead single of the album, "Old Soul," was released on April 19, 2023. The song explores Marley's relationship with his family, key events in his life, and celebrates the history of Jamaican music. These themes are present throughout the album. The album was announced on August 18, 2023, with a release date of September 15. It features a mix of covers and original songs, including guest appearances from Eric Clapton, Bob Weir, Jack Johnson, Ziggy Marley, and more.

Musically, Old Soul is a departure from Marley's previous work and marks his first studio album in seven years. He described it as "old school, eclectic, and healing." In September and October 2023, he embarked on the Old Soul: Unplugged Tour with special guest Mike Love.

== Reception ==
Old Soul received critical acclaim. Daily Reggae praised the album, stating, "This is music that can only be created from the heart and soul, from a place of sincerity and deliberateness. Stephen Marley has a soothing, yet powerful voice carried by acoustic-inspired compositions across the album, and the production is equally smooth. There is absolutely no shortage of talent contained here."

Afropop Worldwide called it "a deeply personal album, showcased in the soulfully autobiographical title song." Marley's lyrics were praised for their maturity and authenticity.

== Commercial performance ==
Old Soul debuted at No. 10 on the Billboard Reggae Albums chart, breaking Marley's streak of four No. 1 debuts on the weekly sales and streaming-driven listing. The album sold 500 copies in pure album sales and received 566,000 in audio and video streams in the US.

== Track listing ==
All tracks are written by Stephen Marley, except when noted.

Old Soul track listing
No.	Title	Lyrics	Length
1.	"Don't You Believe"		2:39
2.	"Cool as the Breeze"		4:38
3.	"Cast the First Stone" (featuring Damian Marley)		3:55
4.	"Thanks We Get (Do Fi Dem)" (featuring Buju Banton)		3:57
5.	"Don't Let Me Down" (The Beatles cover)	John Lennon; Paul McCartney	3:41
6.	"Georgia on My Mind" (Ray Charles cover)	Hoagy Carmichael; Stuart Gorrell	4:29
7.	"Let the Children Play" (Santana cover)	Leon Patillo; Carlos Santana	4:03
8.	"Old Soul"		3:31
9.	"There's a Reward" (featuring Ziggy Marley)		3:45
10.	"This Time"		4:45
11.	"These Foolish Things (Remind Me of You)" (Frank Sinatra cover)	Jack Strachey; Eric Maschwitz (as Holt Marvell)	3:19
12.	"I Shot the Sheriff" (Bob Marley cover; featuring Eric Clapton)	Bob Marley	5:01
13.	"Standing in Love" (featuring Slightly Stoopid)		3:48
14.	"Winding Roads" (featuring Jack Johnson and Bob Weir)		4:27
15.	"Old Soul" (Single version)		3:21
Total length:			59:25
