= Bost & Bim =

French dancehall reggae production duo

- Origin: France
- Genres: Reggae; Dub
- Years active: 1991–present
- Labels: Special Delivery Music; The Bombist
- Members: Matthieu Bost; Jérémie "Bim" Dessus

Bost & Bim is a French dancehall reggae production duo, consisting of Matthieu Bost and Jérémie "Bim" Dessus. They have worked with Jamaican and European reggae artists such as Capleton, Morgan Heritage, Sizzla, Gentleman, and Admiral T. Dessus is the son of economist and engineer Benjamin Dessus.

== Start of career ==
Bost & Bim started work in the early 1990s, respectively as saxophonist and guitarist in different bands, and play on tour with many Jamaican and European artists. Since 1999, Bost & Bim have worked as record producers and have worked on international lineup riddims (rhythms) with the label Special Delivery Music, and with their own label "The Bombist", along with collaborations on albums by other artists.

== Collaboration ==
They collaborated with Brisa Roché and Lone Ranger to release the song "Jamaican Boy", an early-reggae cover version of Estelle's "American Boy". It was played in honor of Usain Bolt at the Olympic Stadium in Berlin, just after his 100m victory at the 2009 World Championships.

In 2016, Morgan Heritage won the Best Reggae Album Grammy Award with Strictly Roots, of which two tracks ("Rise And Fall" and "Wanna Be Loved") were written by Bost & Bim.

== Discography ==
- Yankees a Yard (2005)
- Yankees a Yard 2 (2007)
- The Bombing (2009)
- The Bombing (Vol. 2) (2010)
- Yankees a Yard 3 (2010)
- The Bombing (Vol. 3) (2011)
- Dub Monster (2012)
- Ladies First (Special Blend) (2014)
- The Bombing (Vol. 4) (2014)
- Your Light (2017) (In collaboration with Brisa Roché)
- Quelle Vie (2021) (Deluxe edition released in 2022)
- Warrior Brass (2021)

Every album released was produced solely by Bost & Bim. The Bombing tetralogy consists of reggae remixed of popular songs, such as "Rude Boy" by Rihanna, "Message in a Bottle" by The Police or "P.I.M.P." by 50 Cent.

== Tours ==
Bost & Bim tour as DJs in Europe. Dessus regularly toured with Taïro as his guitarist.

== Death of Bim ==
Jérémie "Bim" Dessus died on June 1, 2016 due to lung cancer at the age of 41. Since then, Bost has continued releasing music under the band name.

== Charts ==
- Fairtilizer.com (number 1 all time reggae tune: Brisa Roché/Lone Ranger "Jamaican Boy")
- Admiral T - Toucher l'horizon number 9 (20 May 2006)
- Tunisiano "Le regard des gens" n°11(fr)n°35(ch)n°24 (be) (1 March 2008)
- Beatsource.com ("Jamaican Boy" in the top 10 all style tunes for a few months)
- iTunes charts ("Jamaican Boy" in the top 10 reggae tunes for a few months)
- Juno.co.uk - several times number 1 and best selling reggae singles (number 9, 17, 48, 64...)
- Trendcharts.de - several times number 1
