= Reign of Fire (album) =

Studio album by Capleton
- Released: August 26, 2004 (U.S.)
- Recorded: 2003
- Genre: Reggae, dancehall
- Length: 79:18
- Label: VP
- Producer: Joel Chin (executive); Christopher Chin; Bobby "Digital" Dixon; Riprock; Michael Finger Stewart; Dwayne Chinque; Richard Fisher; Khabir "Kabs" Bonner; Ian Forrester; Stephen Gibbs; Ryon Kerr; Stephen Marley; Supa Dups

Capleton chronology
The People Dem (2004)	Reign of Fire (2004)	Free Up (2006)

Reign of Fire is the 13th studio album from reggae and dancehall artist Capleton. The album was released on August 26, 2004. The album is said to have production from Bobby Dixon, Khabir Bonner, Ian Forrester, Stephen Gibbs, Ryon Kerr, Richard Fisher and Stephen Marley

== Track listing ==
#	Title	Producer(s)	Composer(s)	Featured Performer(s)	Time
1	"Jah Is My Everything"		Barrett, A./Bailey, C.		4:47
2	"That Day Will Come"	Stephen Gibbs	Gibbs, S./Listrani, N./Bailey, C.		4:06
3	"Wise Up People"	Bobby "Digital" Dixon	Bailey, C./Dixon, Bobby/Myers, B.		3:15
4	"Or Wah"	Richard Fisher	Jarrett, M./Marsh, C./Thomas, D./Bailey, C./Cunningham, C.		2:46
5	"Real Hot"		Daymond, B./Greggs, A./Bailey, C./Shaw, D.		3:04
6	"Ton Load"	Bobby "Digital" Dixon	Meyers, B./Bailey, C./Dixon, Bobby		3:04
7	"Steppin' Up"	Khabir "Kabs" Bonner	Bonner, K./Bailey, C.		3:39
8	"Never Share (Burn Dem)"		Marley, R.N./Bailey, C.		4:17
9	"Undeniable"		Reid, D./Bailey, C.		4:09
10	"Sunshine Girl"	Stephen Marley, Damian Marley	Marley, D./Marley, S,/Bailey, C.	Stephen Marley	4:26
11	"In Her Heart"	Daniel Lewis	Williams, C./Bailey, C./Sterling, M./Lewis, D.		3:50
12	"Who Yuh Callin' Nigga"	Supa Dups	Chin-Quee, D./Bailey, C.		3:20
13	"Open Your Eyes"	Khabir "Kabs" Bonner	Bonner, K./Bailey, C.		4:33
14	"Leaders Let the People Down"	Riprock	Barclay, P./Wallace, L./Bailey, C.		4:50
15	"All My Life"	Bobby "Digital" Dixon	Myers, M./Bailey, C./Dixon, Bobby		4:27
16	"Standing Ovation"	Michael Finger Stewart	Stewart, M./Bailey, C.		3:46
17	"Remember the Days"	Bobby "Digital" Dixon	Bailey, C./Browne, D./Dixon, Bobby		4:27
18	"Fire Haffi Burn"		Parson, L./Bailey, C.		3:52
19	"Jah by My Side"	Harvel Hart	Hart, H./Bailey, C.		3:21
20	"Number One Song"	Ian Forrester	Forrester, I./Bailey, C.		4:10
