= More Fire =

Studio album by Capleton
- Released: May 16, 2000 (U.S.)
- Genres: Dancehall, reggae
- Length: 65:17
- Label: VP
- Producers: Joel Chin (executive); Herbie Miller; Clifton Bailey; Paul Shields

Capleton chronology
One Mission (1999)	More Fire (2000)	Still Blazin (2002)

Professional ratings
Review scores
Source	Rating
AllMusic	4/5 stars
Robert Christgau	(1-star Honorable Mention)
The Encyclopedia of Popular Music	4/5 stars
Spin	9/10

More Fire is an album by reggae and dancehall artist Capleton, released in 2000. The album is a mix of dancehall and reggae, and contains the hit singles "Who Dem? (Slew Dem)" and "Jah Jah City".

The album peaked at No. 3 on the Billboard Reggae Albums chart.

== Critical reception ==
AllMusic called the album "a tight package of sizzling beats and thought-provoking poetry."

== Track listing ==
#	Title	Producer(s)	Composer(s)	Featured Performer(s)	Time
1	"Fire Chant" (Intro)				1:45
2	"Danger Zone"	C. Roach, Clifton Bailey, Norman "Bull Pus" Bryan	Bailey, C/DOrazio, G.		4:22
3	"The More Them Try"	Norman "Bull Pus" Bryan	Bryan, N/Holeness, N/Bailey, C		3:45
4	"Conscience Ahg Heng Dem" (Interlude)				0:29
5	"Who Dem? (Slew Dem)"	King Jammy, Ward 21	Grey, A./McCarthy, K./Bailey, C./James, Lloyd/Crossdale, Paul "Wrong Move"		3:25
6	"Good in Her Clothes"	Michael Johnson	Bailey, C/Johnson, M		3:26
7	"More Prophet"	Desmond*, Rupert Blake	Browne, C./Bailey, C./Johnson, W		3:25
8	"Hunt You"	Louis "Flabba" Malcolm	Malcome, L/Myrie, R/Bailey, C		3:25
9	"Jah Jah City"	Morgan Heritage	Heritage, M/Bailey, C/Collins, M.		3:36
10	"Prophet's Philosophy (Interlude)"				0:57
11	"Critics"	Paul 'Computer Paul' Henton*	Dood, C./Bailey, C.		3:37
12	"Final Assassin (On A Mission)"	Cleveland "Cleve" Brown*, Wycliffe "Steely" Johnson	Brown, C/Bailey, C/Johnson, W		3:56
13	"Bun Dung Dreddie"	Paul 'Jazzwad' Yebuah	Yebuah, P/Bailey, C		3:19
14	"Hands Off"	Desmond*, Rupert Blake	Williams, M/Bailey, C		3:29
15	"Boost No War"	C. Roach, Clifton Bailey, Norman "Bull Pus" Bryan	Bailey, C		3:35
16	"Stand Tall"	Philip "Fatis" Burrell	Bailey, Clifton		3:54
17	"Pure Sodom"	Collin "Bulby" York, Lynford "Fatta" Marshall	Bailey, C/James, Lloyd		4:01
18	"Love Is Coming at You"	Anthony Malvo	Simpson, K./Bailey, C/Cameron, A/Malvo, A	Anthony Malvo, Terry Linen	3:42
19	"Witness"	Sly Dunbar	Brown, S/Dunbar, L/Bailey, C		3:49
20	"Glorify"	Paul 'Jazzwad' Yebuah	Bryan, N/Yubah, P/Bailey, C		3:34
