= The People Dem =

Studio album by Capleton
- Released: November 23, 2004(U.S.)
- Recorded: 2003
- Genre: Reggae
- Length: 79:18
- Label: Penitentiary Records
- Producer: Clifton Bailey (executive); Trevor Sinclair; Mark Hudson; Shane Richards; Norman "Bull Pus" Bryan; Steve Ventura; Delroy "Delly Ranx" Foster; Garfield Hamilton; Troy McLean; Robert Bailey

Capleton chronology
Praises To The King (2003)	The People Dem (2004)	Reign of Fire (album) (2004)

The People Dem is reggae, dancehall artist Capleton's twelfth studio album. It was released on November 23, 2004. The album features guest appearances from Military Man.

== Track listing ==
#	Title	Producer(s)	Composer(s)	Featured Performer(s)	Time
1	"Movements"	Trevor Sinclair	Bailey, C. "Capleton"		3:48
2	"Dem No Ready Yet"	Mark Hudson	Bailey, C. "Capleton"		3:47
3	"Mass Media"	Shane Richards	Bailey, C. "Capleton"		3:09
4	"See Dem"	Norman "Bull Pus" Bryan	Bailey, C. "Capleton"		2:19
5	"Mankind"	Steve Ventura	Bailey, C. "Capleton"		3:42
6	"Level Your Heart"	Delroy "Delly Ranx" Foster	Bailey, C. "Capleton"		3:32
7	"Judgement"	Trevor Sinclair	Bailey, C. "Capleton"		3:28
8	"Jah Lives"	Garfield Hamilton	Bailey, C. "Capleton"		2:52
9	"The People"	Trevor Sinclair	Bailey, C. "Capleton"		3:16
10	"Woman Dem A Gwaan"	Troy McLean	Bailey, C. "Capleton"		3:31
11	"So Fine"	Trevor Sinclair	Bailey, C. "Capleton"		3:32
12	"Burn Them Down"	Delroy "Delly Ranx" Foster	Bailey, C. "Capleton"		3:26
13	"The Woman Dem A Log In"	Delroy "Delly Ranx" Foster	Bailey, C. "Capleton"		3:26
14	"No Time"	Delroy "Delly Ranx" Foster	Bailey, C. "Capleton"	Military Man	3:26
