= Heart of Gold: The Songs of Neil Young Vol. 1 =

Compilation album by various artists
- Released: April 25, 2025
- Label: Killphonic

Heart of Gold: The Songs of Neil Young Part I is a compilation and tribute album to Neil Young.

== Track listing ==
1	Philadelphia - Brandi Carlile
2	Heart of Gold - Fiona Apple
3	Harvest - Mumford & Sons
4	Needle and the Damage Done - Eddie Vedder
5	Lotta Love - Courtney Barnett
6	Old Man - Stephen Marley
7	Here We Are in the Years - Sharon Van Etten
8	Sugar Mountain - Lumineers
9	Comes a Time - the Doobie Brothers with Allison Russell
10	Long May You Run - Steve Earle
11	Mr. Soul - Rodney Crowell
12	Southern Man - Chris Pierce
