= Don't Haffi Dread =

Studio album by Morgan Heritage
- Released: 1999
- Genre: Reggae, dancehall
- Label: VP
- Producer: Bobby Digital

Morgan Heritage chronology
One Calling (1998)	Don't Haffi Dread (1999)	Live In Europe! (2000)

Don't Haffi Dread is an album by the Jamaican band Morgan Heritage, released in 1999. The title track, which advised that one doesn't need dreadlocks to be committed to Rastafari, was a hit. The band promoted the album by supporting Toots and the Maytals on a North American tour.

== Production ==
The album was produced by Bobby Digital. Its songs were cowritten or written by the band; Bunny Wailer and Rita Marley contributed to the songwriting. Dean Fraser played saxophone on the album.

== Critical reception ==
Professional ratings
Review scores
Source	Rating
AllMusic	4/5 stars
The Encyclopedia of Popular Music	4/5 stars
MusicHound World: The Essential Album Guide	3.5/5 stars
The Sun	4/5 stars

The Washington Post wrote that "Peter Morgan is an able lead vocalist, but some of the strongest tracks feature Roy 'Gramps' Morgan, whose powerful baritone vocals are eerily similar to Peter Tosh's." The Mirror called the album "a crucial summer feel-good album which is chock-full of sweet sounds—a hefty 18 tracks—and taking in influences from right across the music firmament."

The Washington Informer praised the "beautiful, rhythmic tones." The Times deemed the album "gloriously laid back"; the paper also considered the band to be "the year's best new find." Americas noted that "clever, socially conscious lyrics and gorgeous vocal harmonies meld with infectious reggae rhythms." The Orange County Register labeled Don't Haffi Dread "hook-laden but serious reggae that's very much in the Marley tradition, though seasoned with a dash of lovers rock."

AllMusic wrote: "Boasting smooth harmonizing and hopeful messages, these singers present a convincing case for the power of simple reggae 'riddims.'"

== Track listing ==
No.	Title	Length
1.	"Reggae Road Block"
2.	"Caught into a Trap"
3.	"Troding Jah Road"
4.	"Don't Haffi Dread"
5.	"Heart of a Child"
6.	"Freedom"
7.	"Talkin' Bout War"
8.	"Earthquake"
9.	"Guess Who"
10.	"Ready to Work"
11.	"Crying Out"
12.	"Don't Go"
13.	"Smile"
14.	"World Cry"
15.	"Send Us Your Love"
16.	"Reggae Bring Back Love"
17.	"New Time, New Sign"
18.	"Don't Haffi Dread (Alternative Mix)"
