= Naiboi =

Kenyan singer, recording artist and producer

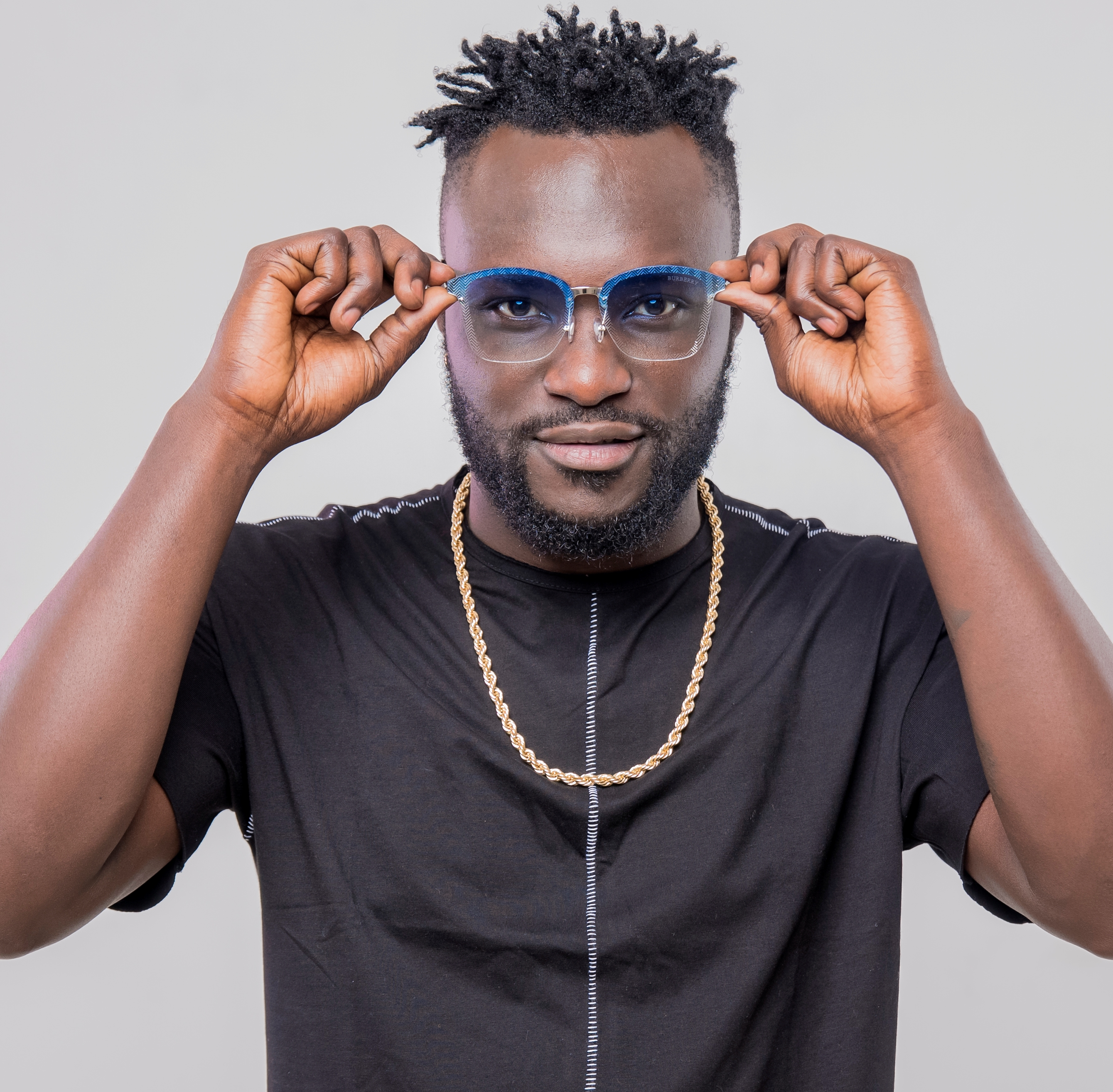

Background information
- Also known as: Naiboi, Nairobi Boy, Rapdamu
- Born: Michael Kennedy Claver; Nairobi, Kenya
- Genres: Afropop; R&B; hip hop; reggae
- Occupations: Singer; songwriter; rapper; record producer; record executive; entrepreneur
- Years active: 2003 – present
- Label: Pacho Entertainment

Michael Kennedy Claver, professionally known as Naiboi, is a Kenyan singer, songwriter, rapper, record producer, record executive, and entrepreneur. In 2014, he made the switch from being solely a music producer, under the moniker Rapdamu, to a recording artist, and with the switch came a change of name to Naiboi. His collaborative records, “Welle Welle” in 2014 featuring Timmy Tdat and “Daktari” 2015 featuring Frasha gained him notoriety and recognition in the Kenyan music scene as a recording artiste of note.

== Early career ==
Naiboi began his career in music in 2003 as a music producer, producing records for several Kenyan and East African artistes, including Qty, Kristoff, Timmy Tdat, King Kaka, Avril and Wyre. He set up a record label, Pacho Entertainment where he signed on up-and-coming artistes with a view of grooming them into full-fledged artistes. During this time he was known by the moniker Rapdamu.

== Rapdamu to Naiboi (2014 - date) ==
In 2014, with the release of the collaborative track, “Welle Welle” featuring Timmy Tdat, he effected the change of name from Rapdamu to Naiboi. The name Naiboi is a play on the words Nairobi (a town in Kenya where he is based) and boy. He was initially called Nairobi Boy, but it was later shortened to Naiboi.

The transition was not just in name, as Naiboi surrendered production duties to the other producers (Jack On The Beat, Cedo, Jegede, Rixx and Illogos) on the pay roll of Pacho Entertainment, to focus solely on his career as a recording artiste.

In 2015, Naiboi featured Frasha on the track “Daktari”, which enjoyed relative success, gaining airplay on radio stations across Kenya and East Africa.

In 2016, Naiboi was featured in Gudi Gudi by Kristoff and Tingika by Rankaddah, the two songs were successful and went on to win the awards for Breakthrough Video and Best New Artist respectively at the Pulse Music Video Awards (PMVAs).

His 2017 single, Problem, topped the music charts in Kenya and enjoyed heavy rotation on all the radio stations. In September 2018, Naiboi released the single “2-in-1”, a love song, which featured several East African celebrities recording videos of themselves ‘jamming’ to the song. Celebrities like Sauti Sol, Nyashinski, Kansoul, Frasha, Kristoff, Kagwe Mungai, Rosa, WRLD, Fena, Martin Kimathi, Mwalimu Rechel were all part of the video which was hugely successful in Kenya and has garnered over 4 million views on the music streaming site YouTube.

Naiboi performed alongside Grammy–Award-winning, Jamaican reggae group, Morgan Heritage at the Wasafi Festival, which held in Nairobi on the eve of the year 2019 and on 4 January 2019, the group made a post on their official Instagram account, which indicated that they would be working on new music with Naiboi.

As of 2019, Naiboi has been selected as one of the artistes from Kenya to feature in the 2019 season of Coke Studio Africa.

== Awards and recognition ==
In 2018, Naiboi's single "2-in-1" received two nominations for Male Video of the Year and Viewers’ Choice of the Year at the 2018 Pulse Music Video Awards (PMVAs). In 2022, he received a Grammy nomination. Naiboi was nominated in 'Best Reggae Album' category for his 'Pamoja' album with dancehall queen Etana.

== Discography ==
=== Selected discography ===
- Welle Welle featuring Timmy Tdat (2014)
- Daktari featuring Frasha (2015)
- Problem (2017)
- 2-in-1 (2018)
- Too Much (2018)
- I wanna be (2018)
