= Full Circle (Morgan Heritage album) =

Album by Morgan Heritage

Studio album by Morgan Heritage
- Released: January 25, 2005
- Genre: Reggae
- Label: VP

Professional ratings
Review scores
Source	Rating
Allmusic	3.5/5 stars

Full Circle is the seventh studio album from the reggae band Morgan Heritage. The album features guest appearances from Sizzla, Damian Marley and LMS. The band toured the Caribbean and the United States in support of the album. The album mixed reggae and other styles, and was described by the Jamaica Star as "the sound of Jamaican dancehall systems and New York hip-hop boom boxes and New England pop radio and California punk rock mosh pits, all fused into an unprecedented, harmonious whole". The album reached the top 15 of the Billboard Reggae Albums chart.

== Track listing ==
1. "Jah Comes First" – 4:00
2. "Armagedon Calls" – 4:38
3. "One Day" – 4:04
4. "Move On" – 4:46
5. "Hail Up the Lion (Uncomfortable)" – 4:06
6. "Hail Rastafari" – 3:28
7. "I'm Still the Same" – 4:00
8. "Your Best Friend" – 4:14
9. "Girlz 'Round Da World" – 4:24
10. "Enough Is Enough" – 4:17
11. "I'm Coming Home" – 3:03
12. "Gangsta Groupie" – 3:50
13. "Propaganda" – 3:55
14. "Mek Wi Try" – 4:00
15. "So Much to Come" - 3:57
16. "Tell Me How Come" – 3:38
17. "U've Got Me (Remix)" - 3:54
