= Bun Friend =

Studio album by Capleton
- Released: June 10, 2008 (U.S.)
- Recorded: 2007–2008
- Genres: Dancehall, reggae
- Labels: Penitentiary, Rude Boy
- Producers: Clifton Bailey (executive); Trevor Sinclair

Capleton chronology
Rise Them Up (2007)	Bun Friend (2008)	Yaniko Roots (2008)

Bun Friend is dancehall artist Capleton's sixteenth studio album. It was released on June 10, 2008. The album is a mix of dancehall and reggae, with hit singles such as "Yo Betta Than" and "Bun Friend".

== Track listing ==
#	Title	Producer(s)	Composer(s)	Featured Performer(s)	Time
1	"Chant Me Song"	Trevor Sinclair	Bailey, C. "Capleton"		3:47
2	"Day Me Borne"	Trevor Sinclair	Bailey, C. "Capleton"		3:46
3	"It's a Meditation"	Trevor Sinclair	Bailey, C. "Capleton"		3:54
4	"Yo Betta Than"	Trevor Sinclair	Bailey, C. "Capleton"		3:35
5	"My Love"	Trevor Sinclair	Bailey, C. "Capleton"		3:06
6	"Music"	Trevor Sinclair	Bailey, C. "Capleton"		3:40
7	"Put Dem in Di Pit"	Trevor Sinclair	Bailey, C. "Capleton"		3:06
8	"Long Time"	Trevor Sinclair	Bailey, C. "Capleton"		4:11
9	"Burne dem Down"	Trevor Sinclair	Bailey, C. "Capleton"		3:27
10	"Something Go Happen"	Trevor Sinclair	Bailey, C. "Capleton"		3:39
11	"Bun Friend"	Trevor Sinclair	Bailey, C. "Capleton"		3:52
12	"She & Fireman"	Trevor Sinclair	Bailey, C. "Capleton"		3:21
13	"Me Love Dem"	Trevor Sinclair	Bailey, C. "Capleton"		2:56
14	"Fire Blazing"	Trevor Sinclair	Bailey, C. "Capleton"		4:08
15	"Chant Down Rome"	Trevor Sinclair	Bailey, C. "Capleton"		3:54
16	"Invitation"	Trevor Sinclair	Bailey, C. "Capleton"		3:43
