= Jo Mersa Marley =

Jamaican reggae musician (1991–2022)

- Born: Joseph Marley; March 12, 1991; Kingston, Jamaica
- Died: December 27, 2022 (aged 31); Miami-Dade County, Florida, US
- Education: Miami Palmetto Senior High School; Miami Dade College
- Occupation: Musician
- Years active: 2014–2022
- Father: Stephen Marley
- Relatives: Bob Marley (grandfather); Rita Marley (grandmother); Ziggy Marley (uncle)
- Musical career
- Genres: Reggae
- Instrument: Vocals
- Label: Ghetto Youths International

Joseph "Jo Mersa" Marley (March 12, 1991 – December 26, 2022) was a Jamaican reggae singer. He was the son of Stephen Marley and Kerry-Ann Smith and the grandson of reggae legend, Bob Marley.

== Personal life ==
Marley spent his early years in Jamaica, where he attended Saints Peter and Paul Preparatory School, before moving to Florida to attend Miami Palmetto Senior High School and Miami Dade College (where he studied studio engineering). His maternal aunt is the artist, Dancehall Queen Carlene.

== Career ==
Marley debuted in 2014 releasing the EP "Comfortable through iTunes and Spotify. He also appeared on a Grammy-winning album Strictly Roots by Morgan Heritage.

In 2015, Marley played Reggae Fest in Philadelphia along with his father, Stephen and uncle Damian “Jr. Gong” Marley during the Catch a Fire tour. In 2020, he released the song Nothings Gonna Harm You dedicated to his young daughter.

He released his second EP "Eternal" on 21 May 2021, which included the single Made It. Dancehall Magazine recommend it as one of its 21 top albums of the year. Of the album, the magazine said "he reveals himself as a lyric spitting melody-making contender in reggae music" and singled out the song Guess Who’s Coming Home as the one in which he "stand[s] out vocally from the other Marleys.

Posthumously, the magazine identified his five best songs as Burn It Down ft. his brother Yohan Marley, Made It ft. Kabaka Pyramid, Yo Dawg ft. Busy Signal, Rock and Swing, and his own take on Bob Marley's Hurting Inside.

== Death ==
On December 27, 2022, Marley died unexpectedly in Miami-Dade County, Florida, of acute asthma exacerbration. He was 31. He was survived by his wife and one daughter. He was interred in Nine Mile, St. Ann Parish, Jamaica along with his grandfather.

== Discography ==
- Comfortable EP (2014)
- Eternal (2021)
