= Boomtown Shakedown =

German band

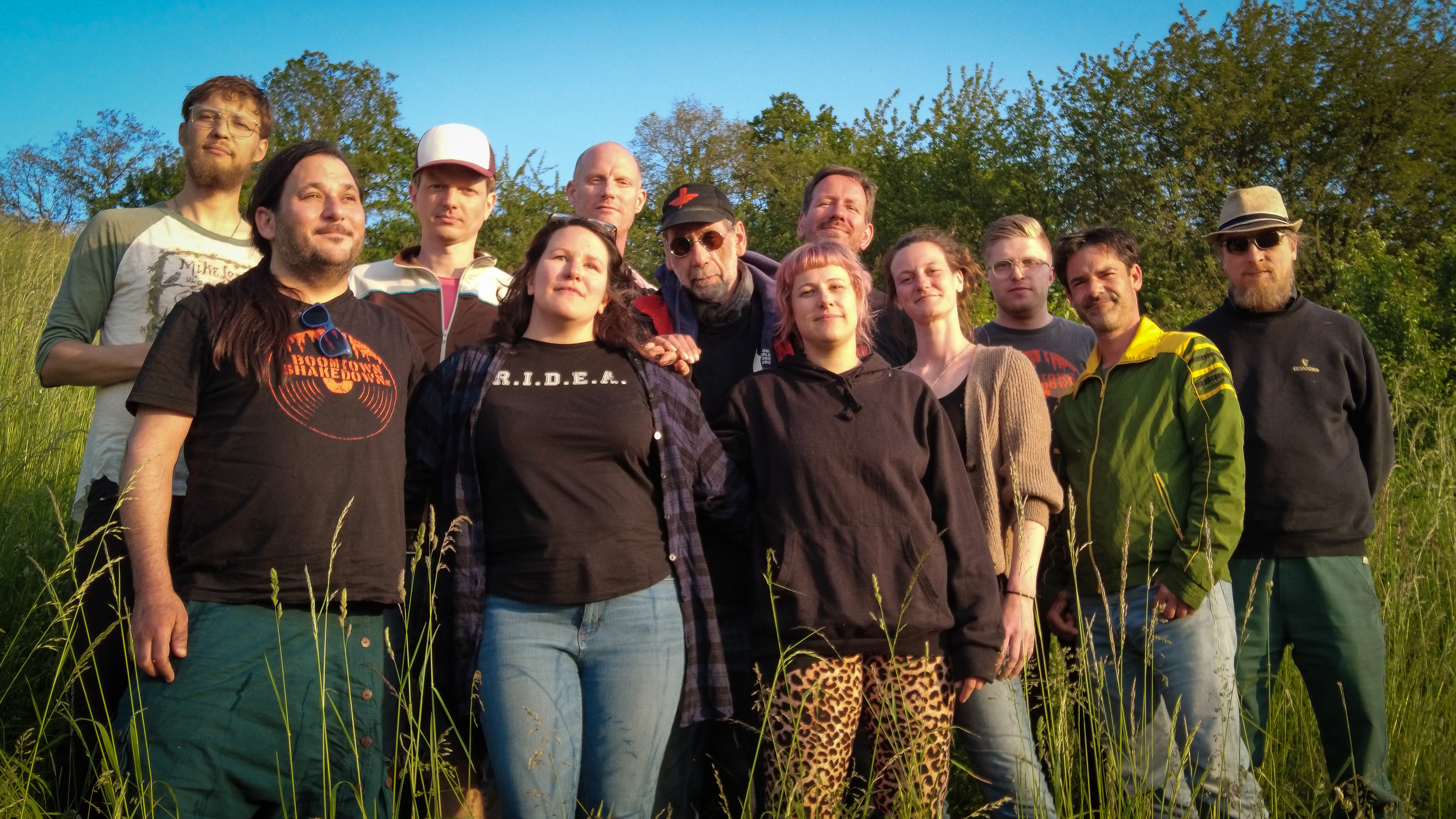
- Boomtown Shakedown, 2023.

Background information
- Origin: Germany
- Genres: Reggae, Ska, Rock
- Years active: 2011–present
- Members: Eduard Siebert – Vocals; Jasmin Siebert – Vocals; Kira Rot – Vocals; Olli – Keyboard; Manuel – Drums; Karsten – Bass; PU – Guitar; Andreas Gleis – Guitar; Benjamin – Saxophone; Lucie Holtmann – Saxophone; Lukas – Trombone; Thomas – Trumpet
- Website: www.boomtownshakedown.de

Boomtown Shakedown is a German band founded in 2011, composed of musicians from Münster and the Ruhr area, Germany. The group blends Reggae and Ska with elements of rock. Their lyrics, written in both German and English, often focus on everyday life and provide a reflective perspective on the world. Themes of nature and social issues frequently play a significant role in their songs and live performances.

== History ==
The band's origins trace back to the Münster-based reggae group Mackatree Posse and the Dortmund band Skankin' Sun, which included some of the current members. Their diverse musical roots contribute to the band's versatile style.

Boomtown Shakedown has performed at renowned pop and reggae festivals such as Juicy Beats, Ruhr Reggae Summer, and Reggae Jam. They have also performed in smaller acoustic setups under the name Boomcoustix at festivals such as the Stemweder Open Air and even in Serbia.

For several years, Boomtown Shakedown has been the opening act for Hawaiian reggae artist Mike Love, organizing video shoots and performances with him.

The band also organizes multi-day cycling tours called Reconnected to Nature, during which they perform live at various locations. These tours combine music, nature, and community, representing the unique spirit of the group.

In 2019, Boomtown Shakedown released the single Heimat critically addressing the establishment of the german Federal Ministry of the Interior and Community and the term "homeland" in Germany. The song, recorded at the SattaDub Studio in Münster, challenges the notion of a singular identity and advocates for understanding homeland as a sum of individual diversities.

In 2022, the band released the live album Live Summer 2022, featuring their performance at the Ruhr Reggae Summer festival. The album includes tracks like Geschenk and Immer Weiter. In March 2023, they followed up with another live album, Rare Guitar Münster, celebrating their 10+2-year anniversary with a concert at the Rare Guitar venue in Münster.

The band also experiments with dub versions of their songs, such as Immer Weiter and Heavy Easy, mixed by Kevin "Prince 2Spliffz" Szeremy and mastered by Jonathan "Lil' Langen" Langenbrinck.

In September 2023, the band's vocalists and saxophonist contributed to Hans Blücher's single Music for Future.

In February 2025, they released Get Loud as a statement against undemocratic parties and in support of an open, free world. In the same month, they released the song Earth Hour together with Hans Blücher, a musical message dedicated to the global environmental initiative of the same name, which calls on people to take a stand for climate protection and take responsibility for a sustainable future. The World Wide Fund for Nature Germany presented the song in March as an exemplary initiative as part of Earth Hour 2025.

== Social Engagement ==
Several members of Boomtown Shakedown have been active in international youth and cultural work for many years. Since 2006, guitarist PU has been organizing band exchanges with young musicians from Poland and the Netherlands through the city partnership of his hometown Emsdetten. In recognition of this initiative, the city was awarded the European Prize by the Institute for European Partnerships and International Cooperation in 2008, and PU was honored with the Chojnice Medal in 2025.

== Discography ==
- 2019: Heimat (Single)
- 2022: Live Summer 2022 (Live Album)
- 2023: Rare Guitar Münster (Live Album)
- 2023: Immer Weiter and Heavy Easy (Dub Versions)
- 2023: Music for Future (with Hans Blücher)
- 2025: Get Loud (Single)
- 2025: Earth Hour (with Hans Blücher)
- 2025: Love Yourself (Single)
