= Islington, Jamaica =

- City
- Location within Jamaica
- Coordinates: 18.321°N 76.852°W
- Country: Jamaica
- Parish: Saint Mary

Population (2009)
  - Total: 2,897

Islington is a settlement in Saint Mary, Jamaica. It has a population of 2,897 as of 2009.

Islington is the birthplace of reggae artist Capleton.
