= Prophecy (Capleton album) =

Studio album by Capleton
- Released: November 7, 1995 (U.S.)
- Recorded: 1995
- Genre: Dancehall, Hip/hop
- Length: 79:18
- Label: African Star/RAL/Def Jam
- Producer: Drew Dixon (executive); Stuart Brown; Roy Francis; Richard Bell; Herbie Miller; Collin 'Bulby' York; Lynford 'Fatta' Marshal; Lil Jon; Paul Lewis

Capleton chronology
Good So (1994)	Prophecy (1995)	I-Testament (1997)

Prophecy is reggae, dancehall artist Capleton's fifth studio album. It was released on November 7, 1995. The album features a guest appearance from a member of the Hip Hop supergroup Wu-tang clan, Method Man.

The album was listed in the 1999 book The Rough Guide: Reggae: 100 Essential CDs.

== Track listing ==
#	Title	Producer(s)	Composer(s)	Featured Performer(s)	Time
1	"Tour"	Stuart Brown	Bailey, C. "Capleton", Stuart Brown		3:49
2	"Big Time"	Stuart Brown	Bailey, C. "Capleton"		3:53
3	"Obstacle"	Stuart Brown	Bailey, C. "Capleton", Stuart Brown		4:08
4	"Leave Babylon"	Stuart Brown	Bailey, C. "Capleton", Stuart Brown		4:12
5	"Heathen Reign"	Roy Francis	Bailey, C. "Capleton", Roy Francis		3:25
6	"Don't Dis the Trinity"	Richard Bell	Bailey, C. "Capleton", Richard Bell		3:52
7	"No Competition"	Collin 'Bulby' York*, Lynford 'Fatta' Marshal*	Bailey, C. "Capleton", Collin 'Bulby' York, Lynford 'Fatta' Marshal		3:28
8	"Wings of the Morning"	Stuart Brown	Bailey, C. "Capleton", Stuart Brown		3:40
9	"See From Afar"	Stuart Brown	Bailey, C. "Capleton", Stuart Brown		4:05
10	"Babylon Judgement"	Stuart Brown	Bailey, C. "Capleton", Stuart Brown		3:47
11	"Glorious Morning"	Stuart Brown	Bailey, C. "Capleton", Stuart Brown		3:42
12	"Chant"	Stuart Brown	Bailey, C. "Capleton", Stuart Brown		3:52
13	"Wings of the Morning" (Lil Jon & Paul's Remix)	Stuart Brown, co-produced by Lil Jon and Paul Lewis	Bailey, C. "Capleton", Stuart Brown, Jonathan Smith, Paul Lewis	Method Man	3:52
14	"Heathen Reign" (Lil Jon & Paul's Mix)	Stuart Brown, co-produced by Lil Jon and Paul Lewis	Bailey, C. "Capleton", Stuart Brown, Jonathan Smith, Paul Lewis		4:57
15	"Tour (Lil Jon & Pauls Remix)"	Stuart Brown, co-produced by Lil Jon and Paul Lewis	Bailey, C. "Capleton", Stuart Brown, Jonathan Smith, Paul Lewis		4:46
16	"Chalice (Lil Jon & Pauls Remix)" (bonus track)	Stuart Brown, co-produced by Lil Jon and Paul Lewis	Bailey, C. "Capleton", Stuart Brown, Jonathan Smith, Paul Lewis		3:41
