= I-Testament =

Studio album by Capleton
- Released: November 25, 1997 (U.S.)
- Recorded: 1997
- Genre: Reggae, hip hop
- Length: 79:18
- Label: Def Jam
- Producer: Herbie Miller (executive); Ian Allen; Roy Francis; Richard Bell; Stuart Brown; Collin 'Bulby' York; Lynford 'Fatta' Marshal

Capleton chronology
Prophecy (album) (1995)	I-Testament (1997)	One Mission (1999)

Professional ratings
Review scores
Source	Rating
AllMusic	3/5 stars
The Encyclopedia of Popular Music	4/5 stars

I-Testament is a studio album by reggae/dancehall artist Capleton. It was released in 1997 via Def Jam. The album contains guest appearances from Q-Tip, Sizzla, Big Youth, and D.V. Alias Khrist.

It peaked at #3 on the Billboard Reggae Albums chart.

== Critical reception ==
AllMusic wrote that the album "owes more to sinewy, seductive contemporary R&B rhythms influenced by ragga and dancehall than to reggae itself, but much of this music is solidly constructed." The Encyclopedia of Popular Music wrote that the album "saw Capleton at the peak of his powers."

== Track listing ==
#	Title	Producer(s)	Composer(s)	Featured Performer(s)	Time
1	"Divide and Rule" (Interlude)				0:22
2	"East Coast to the West Coast"	Stuart Brown	Bailey, C. "Capleton"	D.V. Alias Khrist	3:23
3	"Old and the Young"	Stuart Brown	Bailey, C. "Capleton", Stuart Brown		4:03
4	"Hurts My Heart"	Stuart Brown	Bailey, C. "Capleton", Stuart Brown		4:34
5	"Original Man"	Roy Francis	Bailey, C. "Capleton", Roy Francis	Q-Tip	4:02
6	"Escape the Judgement" (Interlude)				0:22
7	"Nah Bow (Do Now)"	Collin 'Bulby' York*, Lynford 'Fatta' Marshal*	Bailey, C. "Capleton", Collin 'Bulby' York, Lynford 'Fatta' Marshal		7:57
8	"Steep Mountain"	Stuart Brown	Bailey, C. "Capleton", Stuart Brown		3:57
9	"Mark of the Beast"	Stuart Brown	Bailey, C. "Capleton", Stuart Brown	Big Youth	3:52
10	"No Man Can Save No Man"	Stuart Brown	Bailey, C. "Capleton", Stuart Brown		4:04
11	"Movin' On"	Stuart Brown	Bailey, C. "Capleton", Stuart Brown		3:41
12	"Ready to Shout"	Stuart Brown	Bailey, C. "Capleton", Stuart Brown		4:12
13	"Death Row"	Stuart Brown	Bailey, C. "Capleton", Stuart Brown		3:56
14	"Stop the Coming"	Stuart Brown	Bailey, C. "Capleton", Stuart Brown		4:07
15	"Love the One You're With"	Stuart Brown	Bailey, C. "Capleton", Stuart Brown		3:44
16	"Raggy Road"	Stuart Brown	Bailey, C. "Capleton		3:46
17	"Babylon Ah Use Dem Brain"	Stuart Brown	Bailey, C. "Capleton", Stuart Brown, Collins, M.	Sizzla	3:57
18	"Free Our Minds" (Interlude)				0:25
