= I-Ternal Fire =

Studio album by Capleton
- Released: July 6, 2010 (U.S.)
- Recorded: 2009
- Genre: Reggae, dancehall
- Label: VP Records
- Producer: Clifton Bailey (executive); Trevor Sinclair

Capleton chronology
Liberation Time (2008)	I-Ternal Fire (2010)

I-Ternal Fire is the twentieth studio album by reggae, dancehall artist Capleton. It was released on July 6, 2010. The album is a mix of dancehall and reggae.

== Track listing ==
#	Title	Producer(s)	Composer(s)	Featured Performer(s)	Time
1	"Some Day"	Trevor Sinclair	Bailey, Felix		4:15
2	"Acres"	Trevor Sinclair	Bailey, Brown		3:59
3	"When I Come to Town"	Trevor Sinclair	Bailey, Hunt		4:23
4	"Same Old Story"	Stephen "Di Genius" McGregor	Bailey, Brown, McGregor		3:57
5	"Mama You Strong"	Trevor Sinclair	Bailey, Peart		4:14
6	"I'm in Love"	Trevor Sinclair	Bailey, Bryan		3:40
7	"Babylon Go Down"	Trevor Sinclair	Bailey, Brown		3:39
8	"It's On"	Trevor Sinclair	Bailey, Grant		3:30
9	"Global War"	Bobby Dixon	Bailey, Dixon		3:27
10	"Call I"	Trevor Sinclair	Bailey, Thelwell		3:01
11	"All Is Well"	Trevor Sinclair	Bailey, Frenchie		4:29
12	"Them Get Corel"	Trevor Sinclair	Bailey, Grant		3:51
13	"Long Way"	Trevor Sinclair	Andrews, Bailey, Llewellyn		4:07
14	"Blessing"	Trevor Sinclair	Bailey, Harris		4:31
15	"400 Years"	Trevor Sinclair	Bailey, Daley		3:55
