= Mind Control (Stephen Marley album) =

Mind Control Mapula

Studio album by Stephen Marley
- Released: March 20, 2007 (U.S.)
- Recorded: Lion's Den, Miami, Florida, United States; Marley Music, Kingston, Jamaica; Tuff Gong, Kingston, Jamaica
- Genre: Reggae
- Length: 43:28
- Label: Universal / Tuff Gong
- Producer: Stephen Marley

Stephen Marley chronology
Mind Control Mapula (2007)	Revelation Pt. 1 – The Root of Life (2011)

Singles from Mind Control
- 1. "The Traffic Jam" Released: January 15, 2007

Professional ratings
Review scores
Source	Rating
Allmusic	4.5/5 stars
Okayplayer	4/5 stars

Mind Control is the debut album by Jamaican American artist Stephen Marley, released on 20 March 2007. The album won a Grammy in 2008 for Best Reggae Album. An acoustic version of the album was released on 23 December 2008.

== Track listings ==
1. "Mind Control"
2. "Hey Baby" (featuring Mos Def)
3. "Officer Jimmy" (Interlude)
4. "Iron Bars" (featuring Julian Marley, Mr. Cheeks and Spragga Benz)
5. "The Traffic Jam" (featuring Damian Marley)
6. "You're Gonna Leave" *
7. "Chase Dem"
8. "Lonely Avenue"
9. "Let Her Dance" (featuring Maya Azucena and Illestr8)
10. "Fed Up"
11. "Inna Di Red" (featuring Ben Harper)
- "Got Music" (Bonus Track - Limited availability)
- "Someone to Love" (Bonus Track - only on the Best Buy version of the album)
- "Woman I Love You" (Bonus Track - only with complete album purchase from iTunes Store

Enhanced CD version of this album includes "The Traffic Jam" music video.

- * Featuring a sample of "Sandpaper Kisses" by Martina Topley-Bird

== Winding Road ==
- The song "Winding Road" was removed from the album when "Got Music?" became "Mind Control". An updated version of the song featuring Bob Weir and Jack Johnson was released on his 2023 album Old Soul.
