= Delly Ranx =

- Born: Delroy Isaac Foster; Kingston, Jamaica
- Genres: Dancehall
- Occupations: Deejay, record producer
- Years active: 1993–present
- Labels: Pure Music Productions

Delroy Isaac Foster, better known as Delly Ranx (also spelled Delly Ranks), is a Jamaican dancehall deejay and record producer.

== Biography ==
Born in Kingston, Jamaica, Foster was raised as a Christian, but adopted the Rastafarian faith as a teenager. Ranx first had success in the 1990s with singles such as "No Gal No More Than You", and has released more than 80 singles since 1993.

He released the album Good Profile in 2009. In 2010 he had success with the "Saudi Arabia" rhythm which he produced, on which he had a hit himself with "Toppa Toppa", and also provided the basis for hits by Buju Banton, Wayne Wonder, Gramps Morgan and Sizzla. Other rhythm produced by Ranx have been voiced by Sean Paul and Mavado. In 2011 he released a combination album, Fi Di Dancehall, with American singer Sadiki.

Ranx released his third solo album, The Next Chapter, in July 2012, featuring guest appearances from Bunny Rugs and Buju Banton.

His fourth solo album, Sweet Reggae, was released in 2014.

His fifth solo album, Weed Market, was released in February 2018.

He releases his own productions on his Pure Music Promotions label.

== Discography ==
=== Albums ===
- Break Free (2006)
- Good Profile (2009), Itation Records
- Fi Di Dancehall (2011), Skinny Bwoy – Delly Ranx and Sadiki
- The Next Chapter (2012), Pure Music Productions
- Sweet Reggae (2014)
- Weed Market (2018), Pure Music Productions

=== EPs ===
- Chapter 3 Epic Dancehall (2014)
