= Mike Love (reggae musician) =

American reggae musician

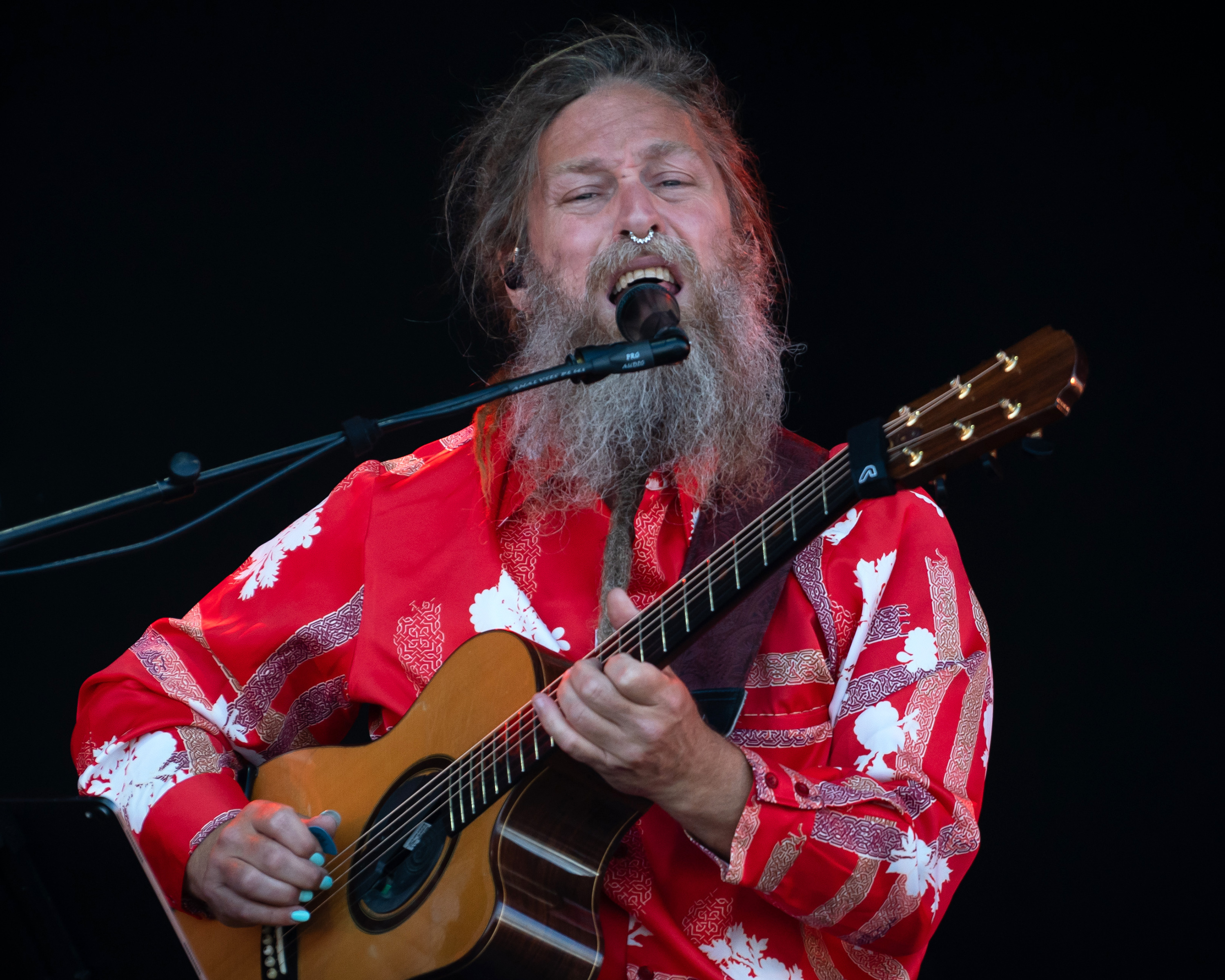
- Mike Love in 2024

Background information
- Born: Oahu, Hawaii
- Genres: Reggae
- Occupation: Musician
- Website: Official website

Mike Love is an American reggae musician and singer from Hawai'i. His 2014 record, Jah Will Never Leave I Alone, reached #3 on Billboard's Reggae chart. He self-describes his style as "revolutionary consciousness music".

== Biography ==
=== Early life ===
Born on O'ahu, he grew up in Kalama Valley and attended Henry J. Kaiser High School.

==== Career ====
He released his debut album The Change I'm Seeking in 2012, followed by Jah Will Never Leave I Alone in 2014, Love Will Find A Way in 2015, and the Love Overflowing EP a year later.

Mike Love opened for Xavier Rudd's Boulder, Colorado concert in 2015, singing together during the end of the show. Love attributes some of his success to his YouTube rendition of "Permanent Holiday", which has more than 20 million views as of 2019. The song's lyrics turn what seem to be a "random assortment of syllables...into a song over a period of three minutes", according to Colossal.

Love has toured in the Philippines (headlining the Malasimbo music festival), New Zealand, and Costa Rica, among other locations internationally. In the US he has played at the Rise Up Music Festival in 2019, the Rhode Island Reggae Festival in 2019, Bhakti Fest in 2019, Think Bank Down By the Riverside in 2019, and was slated to perform at the California Roots Music and Arts Festival until its cancellation due to the COVID-19 pandemic.

Love has collaborated with Clinton Fearon on his album History Say. He participates in Playing for Change. In 2024, Love performed a two-hour set at the Culture Bloom Session (CBS) in Germany during his European tour. The session, co-organized by members of Boomtown Shakedown, featured performances of Love’s original songs and covers, showcasing his fusion of reggae, roots, and world music.

He currently plays with his band, Mike Love and the Full Circle, consisting of John Hawes, Keith Tsukamaki, Reggie Padilla, and Arthur Davis. In addition to touring, the band used to play a weekly gig at Hawaiian Brian's on O'ahu before he moved to the mainland back in 2020 pursuing his music career. All of Love's albums are released independently on his own label, Love Not War Records.
