= Stephen Marley =

American musician (born 1972)

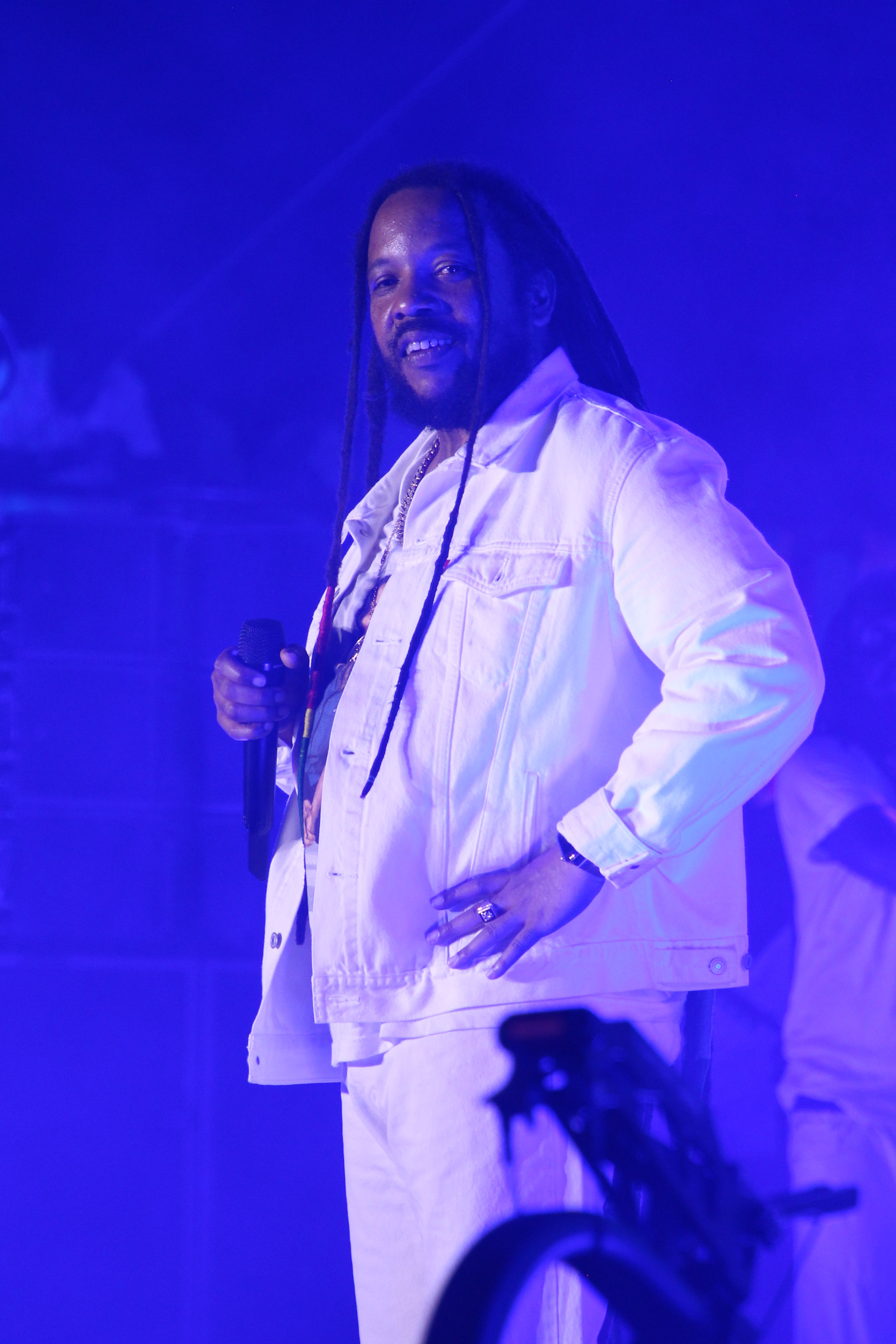
- Marley in 2025 on the JamRock Cruise.

Background information
- Also known as: Raggamuffin
- Born: Stephen Robert Nesta Marley; April 20, 1972 (age 54); Wilmington, Delaware, US
- Genres: Reggae; soul
- Occupations: Musician; singer; record producer
- Instruments: Vocals; guitar
- Years active: 1979–present
- Labels: Tuff Gong; Ghetto Youths International
- Website: stephenmarleymusic.com

Stephen Robert Nesta Marley (born April 20, 1972) is a Jamaican-American musician. The son of Bob Marley, Marley is an eight-time Grammy Award winner, three times as a solo artist, twice as a producer of his younger paternal half-brother Damian Marley's Halfway Tree and Welcome to Jamrock albums, and a further three times as a member of his older brother Ziggy Marley's group Ziggy Marley & The Melody Makers.

Marley's 2011 album Revelation Pt. 1 – The Root of Life won the Grammy Award for Best Reggae Album in 2012. His follow-up, Revelation Pt. 2 – The Fruit of Life, was released on July 22, 2016.

In several of his self-produced solo albums Mind Control (2007), Mind Control Acoustic (2008), Revelation Part I: The Root of Life (2011) and Revelation Part II: The Fruit of Life (2016) he has composed and produced all the songs on his album, and he has played a variety of the musical instruments himself.

== Early life ==
Stephen Marley was born in Wilmington, Delaware, and raised in Kingston, Jamaica. He is the second son of Reggae legend Bob Marley and Rita Marley. Stephen started singing professionally at 7 years old with his elder siblings Ziggy Marley, Sharon Marley and Cedella Marley in Ziggy Marley and the Melody Makers

== Career ==
=== Melody Makers ===
In 1979, a seven-year-old Marley started his musical career as part of the child band Ziggy Marley and the Melody Makers alongside older siblings Ziggy, Sharon and Cedella – the children of Bob Marley and wife, Rita. The Melody Makers recorded the song "Children Playing in the Streets" written by their father Bob Marley. Proceeds of the sale of the song went to the United Nations Children's Fund (UNICEF). In 1980, Stephen performed the lead on the Melody Makers' single "Sugar Pie".

Stephen and older brother Ziggy – Bob Marley's two eldest sons – were directly mentored into music by their father and performed alongside Bob Marley and the Wailers at the 1978 One Love Peace Concert in Kingston, Jamaica, 1979 Reggae Sunsplash in Montego Bay and at Zimbabwe's independence celebrations in Salisbury, Rhodesia (Harare, Zimbabwe) in 1980. The brothers performed, alongside the Wailers and the I Threes, at their father's funeral on May 21, 1981.

After Bob Marley's death, the Melody Makers continued with Ziggy taking over as the group's leader, composing songs such as "What a Plot" in 1982, as well as "Lying in Bed" and "I Met Her on a Rainy Day" in 1984. In 1985, the group released their first album, Play the Game Right. With their third album, Conscious Party, the group was now called "Ziggy Marley and the Melody Makers" with Ziggy performing the lead vocals, and Stephen playing instruments, the group gained fame with hits such as "Tomorrow People", "Tumblin' Down", "Lee and Molly" and "Conscious Party". The album went platinum in the United States, and the Melody Makers would become the youngest recipients of the Grammy for Best Reggae album for Conscious Party.

Their follow up album One Bright Day released in 1989 featured the hit "Look Who's Dancing" written by Ziggy and Stephen. Just 17 at the time, Stephen shared the lead vocals with his big brother and performed dancehall toasting on the song, which also featured energetic backing female vocals by Sharon, Cedella and Erica. Stephen earned the nickname "Raggamuffin" or "Ragga" as he was the first Marley to engage in dancehall rap/deejaying.

Other albums released in the 1990s included Jahmekya, Free Like We Want to B, Joy and Blues, Fallen is Babylon and Spirit of Music. Stephen played a mostly background role, as an instrumentalist, songwriter, and co-producer; but performed the lead vocals on some songs such as "Keep On", "Postman", and "One Good Spliff". Stephen shared the lead with Ziggy on songs such as "Works to Do", a track produced by Stephen himself, and "Water and Oil" adding ragga toasting to Ziggy's singing. Another Ziggy Marley and the Melody Makers song written and fronted (lead vocals) by Stephen was "Tipsy Dazy" featured in the soundtrack of the 1997 Hollywood film Anaconda. Ziggy Marley and the Melody Makers won a total of three Grammy Awards for Best Reggae Album.

=== Music producer ===
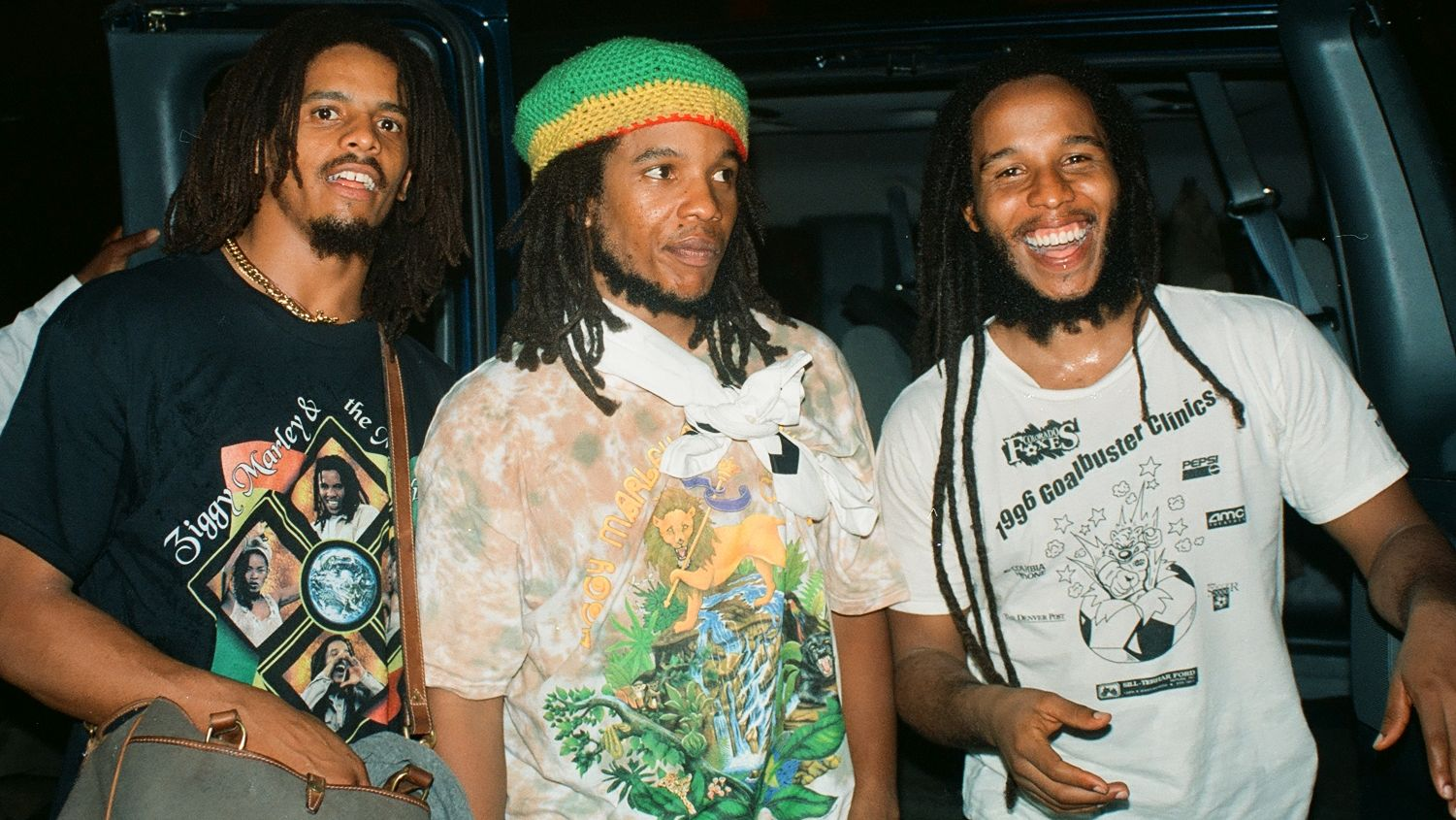
Marley brothers in 1997

In 1999, Marley produced Chant Down Babylon a remix album of Bob Marley's music, modernised to appeal to a modern audience, featuring hip-hop, R&B and rock stars including Lauryn Hill, Erykah Badu, Guru, Busta Rhymes, MC Lyte, Steven Tyler, Joe Perry, Chuck D, and The Roots. The single "Turn Your Lights Down Low" featuring Lauryn Hill became a huge hit internationally, Marley modernising a song that had received little attention as a B side song in the 1977 Exodus album.

In 1996, Stephen produced debut albums by younger brothers Julian and Damian Marley (Bob Marley's sons from relationships outside his marriage to Rita). Stephen was particularly successful in Damian's musical success, producing his brother's first three albums, Mr Marley (1996), as well as the Grammy Award-winning Halfway Tree (2001) and Welcome to Jamrock (2005). Stephen contributed production of three songs to Damian's collaboration album with Nas, "Distant Relatives" (2010). On that album, Stephen produced the songs "Patience", "Leaders" and "In His Own Words", lending vocals to the latter two tracks.

Marley also worked with the Fugees in their mid 1990s remake of Bob Marley's "No Woman No Cry", and produced music for popular hip-hop artists such as Krayzie Bone ("Revolution" from 'Thug Mentality' album 1999), Erykah Badu ("In Love with You" from 'Mama's Gun' album 2000), Eve ("No, no, no" from her 'Scorpion' album, 2001), and Mr Cheeks ("Mama Say" and "Till We Meet Again" from the 'John P Kelly' album, 2001) . He also produced music for dancehall artists such as Capleton, ("Sunshine Girl" from the "Reign of Fire" album, 2004) and reggae legends Inner Circle, ("Smoke Gets in My Eyes" from the 'State of Da World' album, 2009).

In 2022 he produced an EP in tribute to Nina Simone, Celebrating Nina: A Reggae Tribute to Nina Simone, featuring Queen Ifrica, Cedella Marley, and Etana.

=== Solo career ===
After spending many years in the background as a producer, and backing big brother Ziggy as a Melody Maker, Marley finally became a solo artist, releasing the albums Mind Control (2007), Mind Control Acoustic (2008), Revelation Part I: The Root of Life (2011), and Revelation Part II: The Fruit of Life (2016). His first three solo albums won Grammy Awards for Best Reggae Album, adding to the three Grammy Awards he had already won as a member of Ziggy Marley and the Melody Makers and the two other Grammy Awards he earned for producing younger brother Damian's albums Halfway Tree and Welcome to Jamrock."

Mind Control, which featured the single "Hey Baby" featuring Mos Def peaked at number 35 on the Billboard Hot 100, while Revelation Part I: The Root of Life reached position 92 and "Revelation Part II: The Fruit of Life" peaked at position 129. All Marley's albums reached the number 1 position on the Billboard Reggae charts.

In its Mind Control album review published on April 13, 2007, the Austin Chronicle wrote:

Stephen Marley's solo debut is everything a modern reggae album should be. Producer of myriad Marley family recordings, Stephen has developed an ambitious ear... Mindful of the music's deep roots yet awash in dancehall toasts and hip-hop beats, Mind Control layers sound skilfully...the tradition rests in strong hands.

In reviewing Revelation Part II: The Fruit of Life, Jon Pareless, writing in The New York Times on July 20, 2016, noted that:

Being Bob Marley's son has given Stephen Marley a voice with archetypal familiarity, some instant brand recognition and a cultural responsibility. On "Revelation Pt. I," Mr. Marley stayed close to the roots reggae sound Bob Marley perfected in the 1970s with the Wailers, though his album added a few guest rappers. "Revelation Pt. II" is far less purist; it strives for both innovation and radio-friendly crossover. Mr. Marley's aching voice suits love songs just as well as protests...and more often than not, Mr. Marley lives up to the ambition that his last name demands of him.

On April 3, 2017, Marley and Pitbull performed on The Tonight Show Starring Jimmy Fallon, playing their single, "Options".

In June 2023, Marley released the single "Old Soul". On August 18, 2023, he announced his fourth studio album, also titled Old Soul, which was released on September 15, 2023.

== Personal life ==
Marley lives in Miami Beach, Florida, where he has a home and a private recording studio.

His eldest son, Jo Mersa Marley, was a musician who released his EP Comfortable, and died on December 27, 2022. His son Yohan Marley who greatly resembles in looks and voice also began his venture into music with brother Joseph’s song “Burn it Down”, releasing his biggest single to date “Goodbyes” on November 24, 2020. His daughter, Mystic Marley, released "Beatdown", her debut single and music video on June 6, 2018.

On 27th December 2022, his eldest son Jo Mersa Marley was found in Miami-Dade County, Florida, unconscious inside his vehicle after reportedly suffering an asthma attack. He was pronounced dead at the scene.

== Discography ==
=== Studio albums ===
List of studio albums, with selected chart positions
Title	Album details	Peak chart positions					Sales
Title	Album details	US	US Reggae	US R&B/ HH	US Indie	SWI	Sales
Mind Control	Released: March 20, 2007; Label: Universal	35	1	18	—	—	
Mind Control Acoustic	Released: December 23, 2008; Label: Tuff Gong	—	1	—	—	—	
Revelation Pt. 1 – The Root of Life	Released: May 24, 2011; Label: Universal	92	1	20	—	73	US: 46,000
Revelation Pt. 2 – The Fruit of Life	Released: July 22, 2016; Label: Ghetto Youths International	129	1	—	10	69	
Old Soul	Released: September 15, 2023; Label: Ghetto Youths International	—	10	—	—	—	US: 900
"—" denotes a recording that did not chart or was not released in that territory.

=== Singles ===
==== As lead artist ====
Title	Year	Album
"Hey Baby (featuring Mof Def)"	2008	Mind Control
"No Cigarette Smoking (In My Room) (featuring Melanie Fiona)"	2011	Revelation Part 1: The Root of Life
"Rock Stone" (featuring Capleton and Sizzla)	2014	Revelation Pt. 2: The Fruit of Life
"Ghetto Boy" (featuring Bounty Killer and Cobra)	2015	Revelation Pt. 2: The Fruit of Life
"So Strong" (featuring Shaggy)	2016	Revelation Pt. 2: The Fruit of Life
"Old Soul"	2023	Old Soul

=== As featured artist ===
List of singles as featured artist, with selected chart positions and certifications, showing year released and album name
Title	Year	Peak chart positions	Certifications	Album
Title	Year	US Reggae Digital	Certifications	Album
"Coming Home" (Bone Thugs N Harmony featuring Stephen Marley)	2017	—	—	New Waves
"Options" (Pitbull featuring Stephen Marley)	2017	10	—	Climate Change

=== Television appearances ===
- Marley appears in the second season of Luke Cage. In the episode "On and On", he performs "Chase Dem" on the stage of Harlem's Paradise as Bushmaster is taking over the club.
