= Morgan Heritage =

Jamaican reggae band

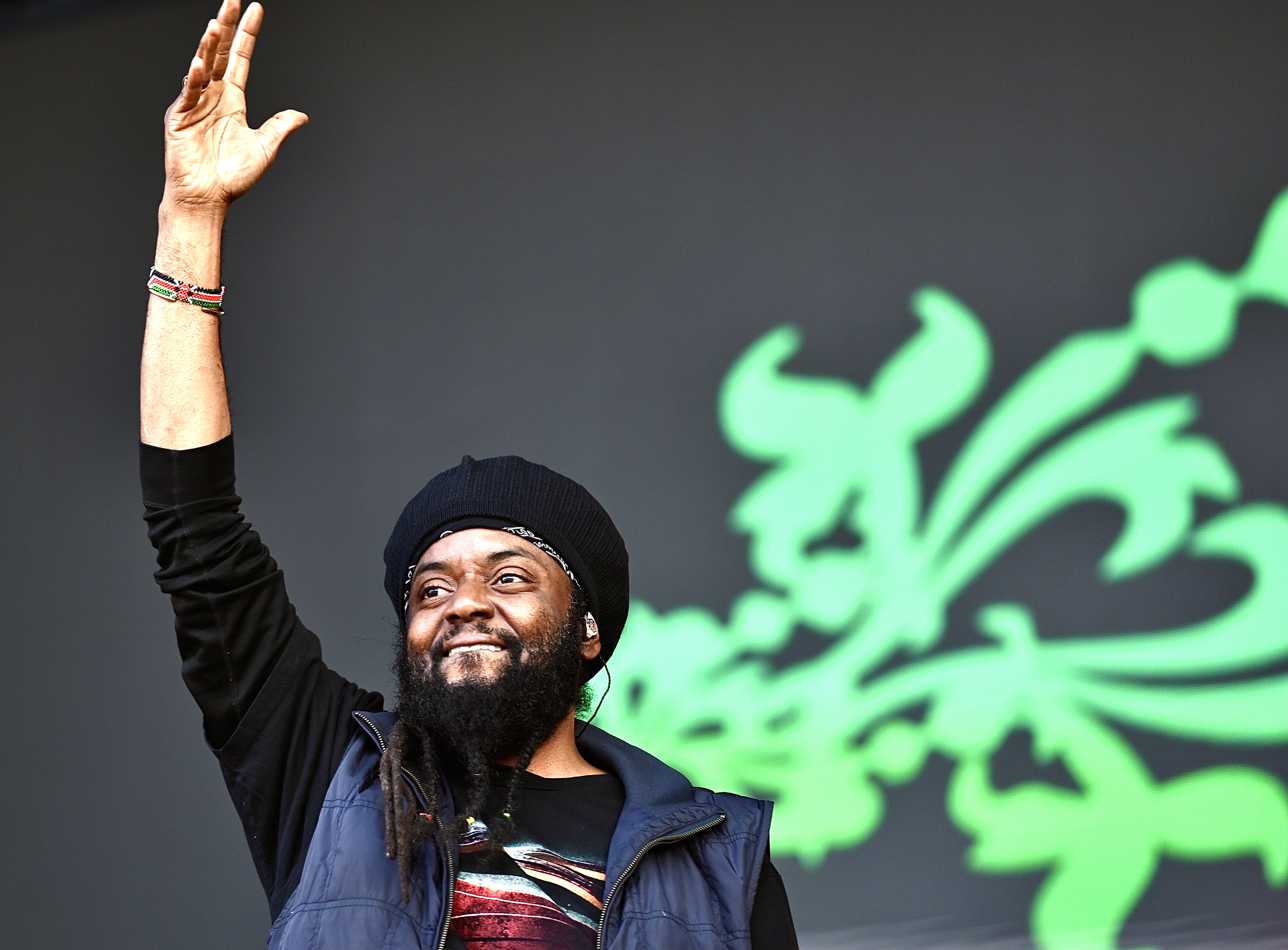
- Morgan Heritage in concert at Reggae Geel 2022

Background information
- Origin: Brooklyn, New York; Springfield, Massachusetts; Jamaica
- Genres: Reggae
- Years active: 1994–present
- Labels: VP Records; CTBC Music Group; N Cool To Be Conscious Music Group; Membran 7 Empire
- Members: Una Morgan; Roy "Gramps" Morgan; Memmalatel "Mr. Mojo" Morgan; Jemere Morgan
- Past members: Peter "Peetah" Morgan; Nakhamyah "Lukes" Morgan
- Website: morganheritagemusic.com

Morgan Heritage is a Grammy-winning Jamaican reggae band formed in 1994 by five children of reggae artist Denroy Morgan, namely Peter "Peetah" Morgan, Una Morgan, Roy "Gramps" Morgan, Nakhamyah "Lukes" Morgan, and Memmalatel "Mr. Mojo" Morgan. They have toured internationally and released a number of reggae albums.

== Career ==
Morgan Heritage, formed in 1994, made their first appearance at Reggae Sunsplash in Jamaica. They were subsequently signed by MCA and released their debut album Miracles the same year. This album was more pop-influenced than their later work.

After the release of Miracles, the family moved to Denroy's homeland of Jamaica. In this period, three family members left the group. Once in Jamaica, Morgan Heritage began working with reggae producers Bobby Dixon and Lloyd James, resulting in the release of their second album Protect Us Jah (1997), followed by One Calling (1998), and the spiritually-inclined Don't Haffi Dread (1999). They released three compilation albums by "The Morgan Heritage Family and Friends", and a live album, Live in Europe!, recorded on their 2000 tour. Following the release of their 2001 album More Teachings... Morgan Heritage toured Europe again, and they later returned several times. Also in 2001 they took part in the Vans Warped Tour.

Their sixth studio album, Three in One, came out in 2003. They released two DVDs, "Live In London" and "Live Over Europe 2003", and their seventh studio album Full Circle was released in 2005. Their latest album, Mission In Progress, was released on 15 April 2008. It includes the singles "Faithful" and "Raid Rootz Dance".

After several years during which the members worked on solo projects, the band came together to release the single "The Return" in 2012, and indicated that a new album would be recorded after their 2012 European tour. The album, Here Come the Kings was released by VP Records in June 2013, followed by a tour of Europe.

Morgan Heritage have worked with many reggae bands and DJs, including Capleton, Junior Kelly, Luciano, Gentleman and Beres Hammond.

The group's 2015 album Strictly Roots won the Grammy Award in the Best Reggae Album category in 2016. The band later released the album Avrakedabra, which was nominated for another Grammy in 2018 for the album "Avrakedabra", and in 2019 received a second Grammy.

In February 2024, Morgan Heritage lead singer Peter "Peetah" Morgan died at the age of 46.

== Band members ==
- Una Morgan (1994–2019; 2025–present)
- Roy "Gramps" Morgan (1994–present)
- Memmalatel "Mr. Mojo" Morgan (1994–present)
- Jemere Morgan (2025–present)

== Past members ==
- Peter "Peetah" Morgan (1994–2024; deceased)
- Nakhamyah "Lukes" Morgan (1994–2019)

== Videos ==
- "Let's Make Up"
- "Don't Haffi Dread"
- "I'll Do Anything For You (Rebirth)" (with Denroy Morgan)
- "Saddle Up" (LMS + Morgan Heritage)
- "U've Got Me"
- "Tell Me How Come"
- "Faithful"
- "Liberation Riddim" (Morgan Heritage Family & Friends)
- "Raid Rootz Dance"
- "Nothing to Smile About"
- "Perfect Love Song"
- "Put It On Me"
- "Perform and Done"

== Albums ==
- Miracles (1994)
- Protect Us Jah (1997)
- One Calling (1998)
- Don't Haffi Dread (1999)
- Live In Europe! (2000)
- More Teachings (2001)
- Three In One (2003)
- Live In Amsterdam! (2003)
- Morgan Heritage Family and Friends, Vol. 1 (2004)
- Morgan Heritage Family and Friends, Vol. 2 (2005)
- Morgan Heritage Family and Friends, Vol. 3 (2005)
- Full Circle (2005)
- Live - Another Rockaz Moment (2006)
- Mission In Progress (2008)
- Journey Thus Far - Best of (2009)
- Here Come the Kings (2013), VP
- Strictly Roots (2015) Music Album
- Avrakedabra (2017), Cool To Be Conscious Music Group
- Loyalty (2019), CTBC Music Group/Membran 7 Empire

== Related acts ==
Members of the band have been involved in other projects. Peetah Morgan has released new music featuring his solo sound, including the songs "Stay Getting High", and "Let's Do This" (featuring Alaine), and recorded an album, "T.U.T. (The Undeniable Truth)".

Roy "Gramps" Morgan, CEO of Dada Son Entertainment, released his debut album as a solo artist, entitled Two Sides of My Heart. In 2009, he was featured in the India.Arie song "Therapy". His second solo album, Reggae Music Lives, was released in 2012.

In 2012, Mojo Morgan signed to Krian Music Group. He released his debut solo album in 2013.

Jemere Morgan, son of Roy "Gramps" Morgan, has also made a career in music, releasing his debut single "First Kiss" in August 2011 through Dada Son Entertainment. He recently toured in Europe with Peetah and Gramps Morgan as their opening act. He also toured with Morgan Heritage on their 'Here Come The Kings' tour in 2013.

Denroy Morgan, father of the Morgan Heritage band members, has released four albums of reggae music.

Other Morgan siblings have developed a more hip-hop influenced band called LMS, which often tours with Morgan Heritage.

In January 2019, after performing at the Wasafi Festival in Nairobi on New Year's Eve alongside, Kenyan singer Naiboi, they announced on their Instagram page that they would be working on a project together with the artiste.
