= Capleton =

Jamaican musician (born 1967)

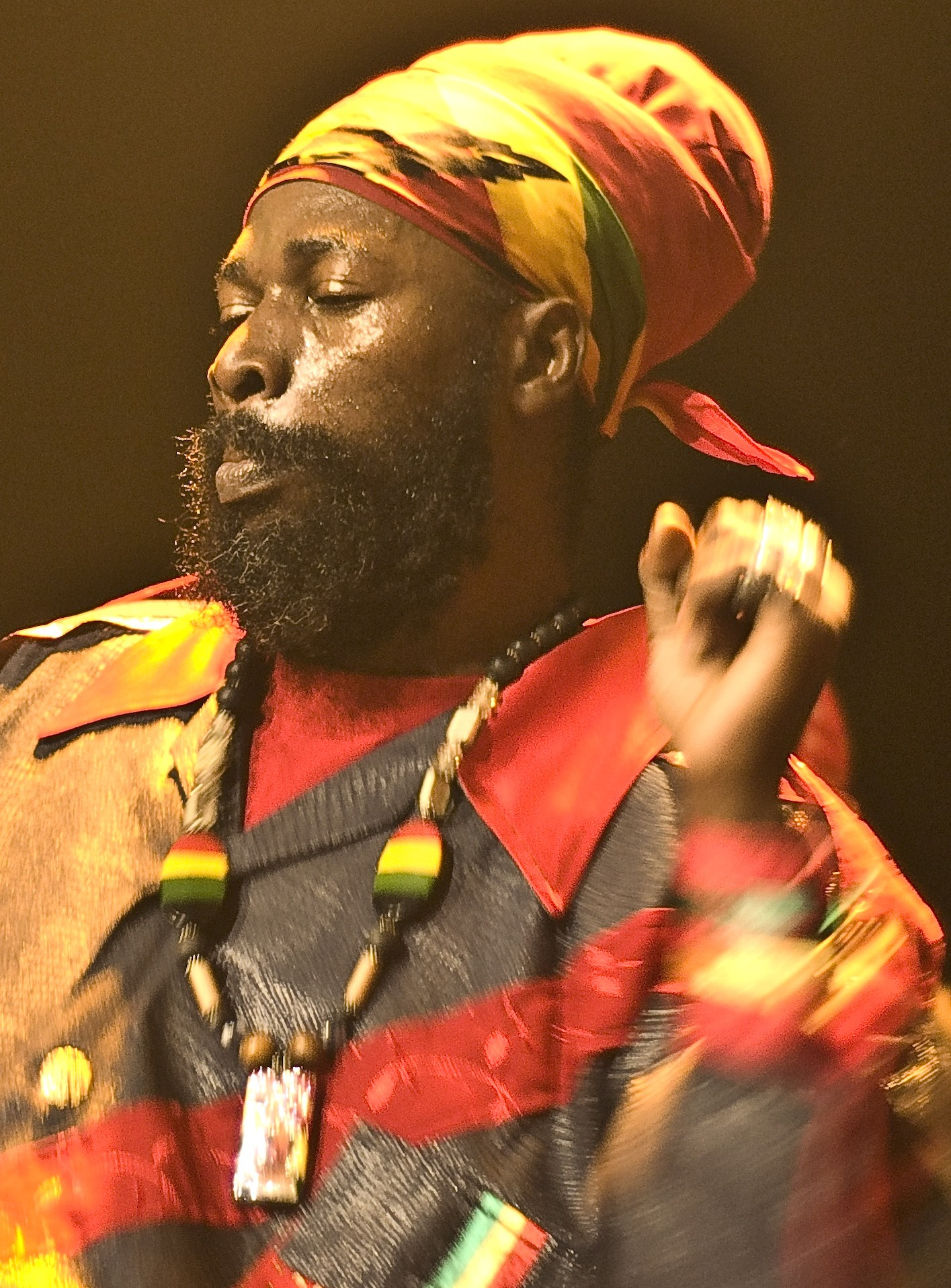
- Capleton performing in 2008

Background information
- Also known as: King Shango; The Fireman; The Prophet
- Born: Clifton George Bailey III; 13 April 1967 (age 59); Islington, Jamaica
- Genres: Reggae; roots reggae; dancehall
- Occupation: Musician
- Instrument: Vocals
- Years active: 1985–present
- Labels: VP; Suge; RAL; PolyGram; Rude Boy; Exterminator
- Website: capletonmusic.com

Clifton George Bailey III (born 13 April 1967), better known by his stage name Capleton, is a Jamaican reggae and dancehall musician. He is also referred to as King Shango, King David, The Fireman and The Prophet. His record label is called David House Productions. He is known for his Rastafari views expressed in his songs.

== Early life ==
Bailey was born in Islington in St. Mary in 1967. As a youth, he was given the surname of a popular St. Mary lawyer and friend of the family, Capleton, as a nickname by his relatives and friends. Capleton rejects the name given to him at birth. He now prefers "King Shango", given its roots in the Yoruba language. His sister is Aleen Bailey, 2004 Olympic gold medalist sprinter for Jamaica.

As a teenager, he sneaked out of his home to catch local dancehall acts, eventually leaving St. Mary for Kingston at the age of 18 to work on his career as a dancehall deejay.

== Career ==
=== Early career ===
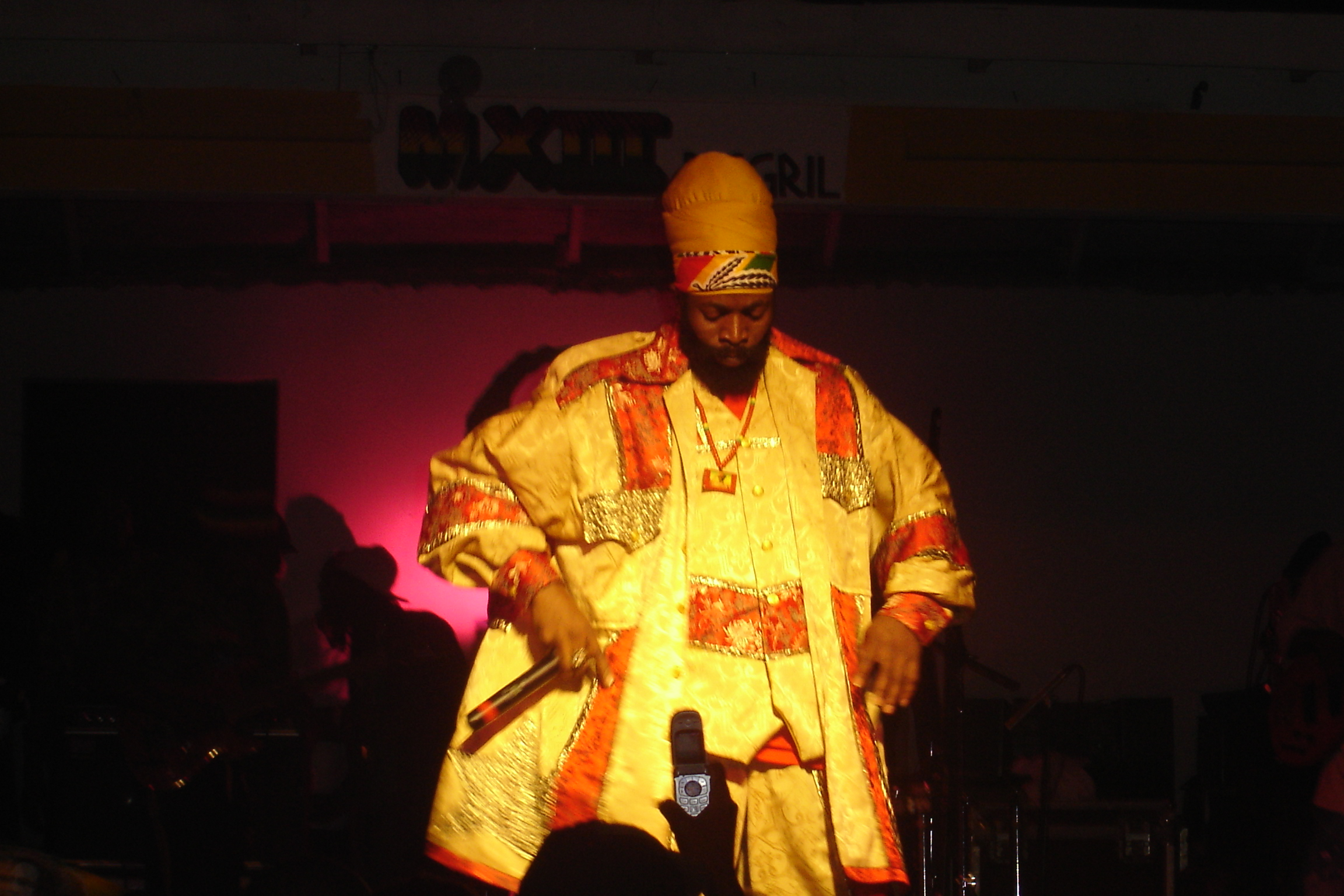
Capleton performing in Germany in 2006

In 1989, he got his first big international exposure. Stewart Brown, owner of a Toronto-based sound called African Star, gave the untested artist his first break, flying him to Canada for a stage show alongside Ninjaman and Flourgon.

When Capleton first arrived on the scene in the late 1980s, slackness and gun talk were the dominant lyrics in the dancehalls. The pre-Rasta Capleton had a string of hit songs from "Bumbo Red" to "Number One on the Look Good Chart" and "No Lotion Man".

He recorded the song that began to establish his significant place in dancehall, "Alms House" in 1992. The tune became a big hit in the dancehall, followed up immediately by "Music is a Mission" and the hit "Tour". By 1993, he was voicing tunes which became increasingly conscious, such as "Prophet" and "Cold Blooded Murderer".

Tunes such as "Tour" and "Wings of the Morning" earned him a deal with Russell Simmons' Def Jam Recordings, which culminated in the Prophecy and I-Testament albums of the mid-1990s.

=== Later career ===
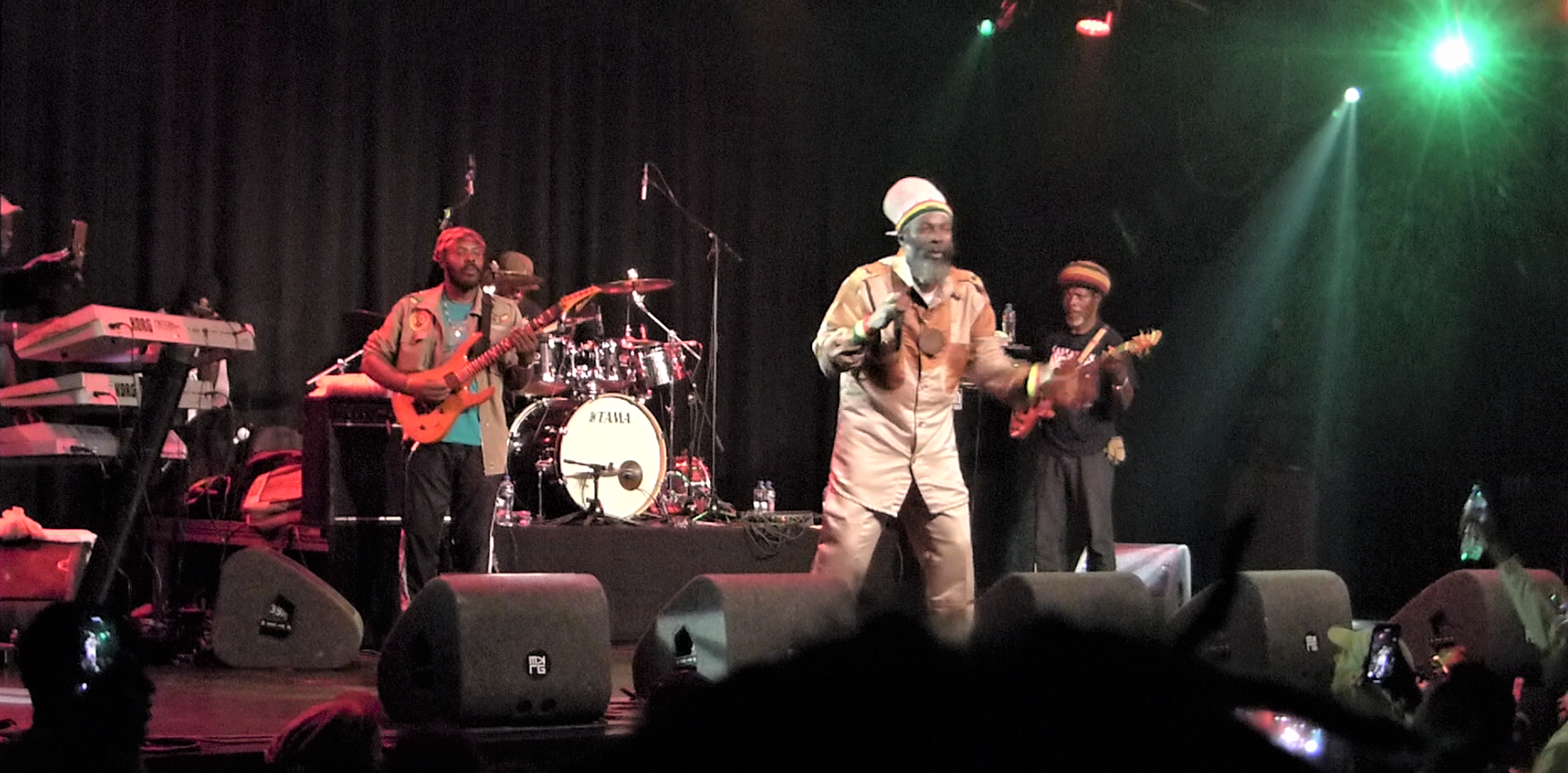
Capleton in Melkweg, Amsterdam

In 1999, Capleton headlined Reggae Sumfest's dancehall night, to much fanfare. The performance, which led to a subsequent headliner placement the following year, is credited with "re-bussing", or creating a comeback for, his career. The 1999–2000 period elicited a string of hits, many of which can be found on the album More Fire.

By 2004, some argued the quality of Capleton's music had been downgraded by over-proliferation on numerous riddims, while Capleton himself argued his continued recording over both dancehall and roots reggae riddims created balance in his musical output. Nonetheless, he scored hit singles over one of the most popular riddims of 2004, "That Day Will Come" over the Hard Times riddim.

After a hiatus from the label, Capleton returned to VP Records in 2010 with the release of I-Ternal Fire.

After headlining a U.S. tour which included Romain Virgo, Munga Honorable, and Kulcha Knox in the fall of 2010, Capleton embarked upon a tour of the African continent for late 2010 and early 2011. Stops included Gambia, Senegal, South Africa and multiple dates in Zimbabwe. In December 2012 the music Unite Cape Town International Reggae Festival saw Capleton, plus reggae and dancehall artists including Black Dillinger, and Blak Kalamawi.

Capleton's annual 'A St Mary Mi Come From' live show has raised funds for several charities since it was first staged in 2000, including local schools and hospitals.

== Religious views ==
Capleton makes reference to Bobo Ashanti, one of the various mansions of the Rastafari movement. Yet he frequently mentions there is no separation between the mansions of Rastafari as he sees it. He stated in an interview on TraceTV that he is a vegan, not consuming meat or dairy in any form, but he also rejects anything made from soya. He also touches on the subject of his lyrics regarding fire, saying they are metaphoric references of purification, not violence or murder.

Capleton has faced criticism for anti-gay lyrics in some of his songs though homosexuality remains illegal in his native Jamaica. His manager has argued that some of the controversial lyrics have been mistranslated and do not actually refer to gays. Capleton himself has admitted that through his Rastafari faith he believes that a homosexual lifestyle is not right, but has insisted that terms such as "burn" and "fire" are not to be understood in the literal sense "to go out and burn and kill people", but as a metaphor for "purification" and cleansing. However, Capleton has continued to sing songs that some see as anti-gay, causing the cancellation of a concert in Switzerland in 2008 and a United States tour in 2010.

== Discography ==
- Lotion Man – 1991
- Alms House – 1993
- Good So – 1994
- Prophecy – 1995
- I-Testament – 1997
- One Mission (compilation) – 1999
- Gold – 2000
- More Fire – 2000
- Final Assassin – 2000
- Still Blazin' – 2002
- Voice of Jamaica, Vol.3 – 2003
- Praises to the King – 2003
- Reign of Fire – 2004
- The People Dem – 2004
- Duppy Man (featured with Chase & Status)
- Free Up – 2006
- Hit Wit Da 44 Rounds – 2007
- Rise Them Up – 2007
- Bun Friend – 2008
- Yaniko Roots – 2008
- Jah Youth Elevation – 2008
- Liberation Time (featured with AZAD) (2009)
- I-Ternal Fire – (2010)
- Heights of Fire – (2026)
