= List of lovers rock artists =

This is a list of lovers rock artists. This includes artists who have either been very important to the genre, or have had a considerable amount of exposure (such as in the case of one that has been on a major label). Groups are listed by the first letter in their first name (not including the words "a", "an", or "the"), and individuals are listed by last name.

== A ==
- Jean Adebambo
- Toyin Adekale
- Marcia Aitken
- Alaine
- Ambelique
- Horace Andy
- Mike Anthony
- Antonio
- Aswad

== B ==
- Beshara
- Barry Biggs
- Barry Boom
- Ken Boothe
- Judy Boucher
- Dennis Bovell
- Dennis Brown
- Brown Sugar

== C ==
- Fil Callender
- Al Campbell
- Don Campbell
- The Chosen Few
- The Cool Notes

== D ==
- Carlene Davis
- Junior Delgado
- Errol Dunkley

== E ==
- Alton Ellis
- Hortense Ellis
- Junior English

== F ==
- Sharon Forrester

== G ==
- Boris Gardiner
- Deborahe Glasgow
- Marcia Griffiths

== H ==
- Audrey Hall
- Beres Hammond
- Trevor Hartley
- Josh Heinrichs
- John Holt
- Peter Hunnigale

== I ==
- The Instigators
- Gregory Isaacs

== J ==
- Tex Johnson
- Vivian Jones
- Junior Tucker

== K ==
- Janet Kay
- Pat Kelly
- Kofi
- Calvin King

== L ==
- Phillip Leo
- June Lodge
- Eddie Lovette
- Lukie D

== M ==
- Leroy Mafia
- Christopher Martin
- Louisa Mark
- Freddie McGregor
- Freddie McKay
- Bitty McLean
- Me and You
- Sugar Minott
- Gramps Morgan
- Junior Murvin

== N ==
- Pam Nestor

== P ==
- Frankie Paul
- Dawn Penn
- Maxi Priest

== R ==
- Danny Ray
- Winston Reedy
- Junior Reid
- Tarrus Riley
- Romain Virgo
- Samantha Rose
- T.T. Ross

== S ==
- Sanchez
- Dee Sharp
- Pluto Shervington
- Singing Melody
- Richie Stephens

== T ==
- The Tamlins
- Sylvia Tella
- Nicky Thomas
- Ruddy Thomas
- Carroll Thompson
- Tradition

== U ==
- Thriller U

== V ==
- Romain Virgo
- Vivian Jones

== W ==
- Wayne Wade
- Trevor Walters
- Caron Wheeler
- Ginger Williams
- Delroy Wilson
- Winsome
- Wayne Wonder
