= Caron Wheeler discography =

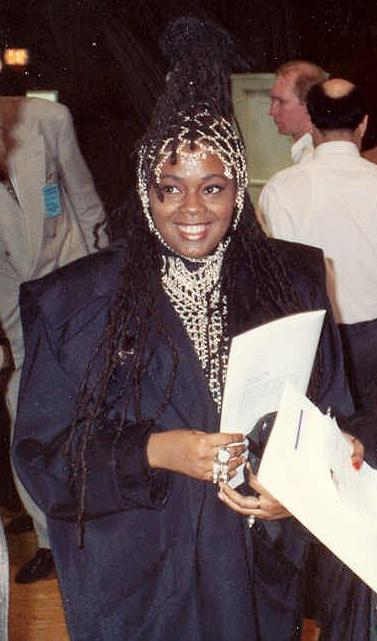
- Studio albums: 2
- Live albums: 1
- Compilation albums: 1
- Singles: 14

British singer and songwriter Caron Wheeler has released two studio albums, one live album, one compilation albums, and 14 singles (including 4 as a featured artist). She has sold over 6.6 million records collectively as a solo artist and, with Brown Sugar and Soul II Soul.

== Albums ==
=== Studio albums ===
List of studio albums, with selected chart positions, sales figures and certifications
Title	Album details	Peak chart positions						Certifications
Title	Album details	UK	AUS	NLD	SWE	US	US R&B	Certifications
UK Blak	Release date: 15 May 1990; Label: EMI; Format: CD, LP, digital download	14	128	75	43	133	30	BPI: Silver
Beach of the War Goddess	Release date: 23 February 1993; Label: EMI; Format: CD, LP, digital download	—	125	—	—	—	81	
"—" denotes items which were not released in that country or failed to chart.

=== Live albums ===
List of live albums
Title	Album details
Live at Duo Music Exchange	Release date: January 2006; Label: Universal / Soft Exchange; Format: CD/DVD, digital download

=== Compilation albums ===
List of compilation albums
Title	Album details
Remix Only for Japan	Release date: August 1991; Label: EMI; Format: CD, LP, digital download

== Singles ==
=== As lead artist ===
List of singles as lead artist, with selected chart positions and certifications, showing year released and album name
Title	Year	Peak chart positions									Certifications	Album
Title	Year	UK	AUS	GER	IRE	NLD	NZ	US	US R&B	US Dance	Certifications	Album
"Livin' in the Light"	1990	14	112	46	25	26	43	53	3	1		UK Blak
"UK Blak"	1990	40	—	—	—	50	—	—	44	—		UK Blak
"Blue (Is the Colour of Pain)"	1991	—	—	—	—	—	—	—	37	—		UK Blak
"Don't Quit"	1991	53	—	—	—	—	—	—	—	—		UK Blak
"I Adore You"	1992	59	—	—	—	—	—	—	12	—		Beach of the War Goddess
"In Our Love"	1993	—	—	—	—	—	—	—	61	—		Beach of the War Goddess
"Soul Street"	1993	—	184	—	—	—	—	—	—	—		Beach of the War Goddess
"Beach of the War Goddess"	1993	75	—	—	—	—	—	—	—	—		Beach of the War Goddess
"Star"	1999	—	—	—	—	—	—	—	82	—		Non-album single
"A New Day" (featuring Louie Vega and Jazzie B) (Note: "A New Day" features the members of Soul II Soul (consisting of Caron Wheeler and Jazzie B), but is credited under Caron Wheeler and Jazzie B.)	2016	—	—	—	—	—	—	—	—	—		Non-album single
"—" denotes items which were not released in that country or failed to chart.

=== As featured artist ===
List of singles as featured artist, with selected chart positions and certifications, showing year released and album name
Title	Year	Peak chart positions											Certifications	Album
Title	Year	UK	AUS	CAN	GER	IRE	NLD	NZ	SWI	US	US R&B	US Dance	Certifications	Album
"Keep On Movin'" (Soul II Soul featuring Caron Wheeler) (Note: Wheeler was credited as a featured vocalist, but she was a current member of Soul II Soul.)	1989	5	77	15	13	10	9	14	18	11	1	1	BPI: Silver; RIAA: Platinum	Club Classics Vol. One
"Back to Life (However Do You Want Me)" (Soul II Soul featuring Caron Wheeler)	1989	1	45	11	4	6	1	4	2	4	1	1	BPI: Gold; MC: Gold; RIAA: Platinum	Club Classics Vol. One
"Keep on Movin' (Remix)" (Soul II Soul featuring Caron Wheeler)	1996	31	—	—	—	—	—	—	—	—	—	—		Non-album single
"Just the Two of Us" (Toshinobu Kubota featuring Caron Wheeler)	1996	—	—	—	—	—	—	—	—	—	—	—		Sunshine, Moonlight
"Treat You" (Omar featuring Caron Wheeler)	2013	—	—	—	—	—	—	—	—	—	—	—		The Man
"—" denotes items which were not released in that country or failed to chart.

== Album appearances ==
Song	Year	Artist(s)	Album
"Kamen no yoru"	1988	Masami Tsuchiya (feat. Caron Wheeler and Naomi Osborne)	Horizon
"Too Many Tears"	1988	Masami Tsuchiya (feat. Caron Wheeler and Naomi Osborne)	Horizon
"Black Woman"	1989	Jungle Brothers (feat. Caron Wheeler)	Done by the Forces of Nature
"Just the 2 of Us"	1991	Toshinobu Kubota (feat. Caron Wheeler)	Kubojah: Parallel World I
"Pastime Paradise"	1992	Ray Simpson (feat. Caron Wheeler)	Ray
"No Room for Love"	1996	Dilba (feat. Caron Wheeler)	Dilba
"Someone Who Cares"	1997	Eric Gadd (feat. Caron Wheeler)	The Right Way
"You're Mine"	1997	Eric Gadd (feat. Caron Wheeler)	The Right Way
"Open"	2001	Da Beatminerz (feat. Caron Wheeler)	Brace 4 Impak
"Earth"	2002	Meshell Ndegeocello (feat. Caron Wheeler)	Cookie: The Anthropological Mixtape
"Trust"	2002	Meshell Ndegeocello (feat. Caron Wheeler)	Cookie: The Anthropological Mixtape
"Better by the Pound"	2002	Meshell Ndegeocello (feat. Caron Wheeler)	Cookie: The Anthropological Mixtape
"Criterion"	2002	Meshell Ndegeocello (feat. Caron Wheeler)	Cookie: The Anthropological Mixtape
"Lonely"	2003	Richard X (feat. Caron Wheeler)	Richard X Presents His X-Factor Vol. 1
"Another Star"	2003	Caron Wheeler	Conception - An Interpretation of Stevie Wonder's Songs
"Still Running"	2004	D'Influence (feat. Caron Wheeler)	D-Vas After Hours
"Candy Rain"	2008	Caron Wheeler	The World Sings Kubota

== Soundtrack appearances ==
Song	Year	Movie
"No Regrets"	1990	Three Men and a Little Lady
"Don't Quit"	1991	Career Opportunities
"I Adore You"	1992	Mo' Money
"Free Again"	1998	How Stella Got Her Groove Back

== See also ==
- Brown Sugar discography
- Soul II Soul discography
