= Antonio (singer) =

- Also known as: Singing Morris
- Born: Maurice Silvera; 10 October 1973 (age 52); Port Antonio, Portland, Jamaica
- Genres: Reggae
- Years active: Mid-1980s–present
- Labels: Jet Star, Sun Vibes

Maurice Silvera (born 10 October 1973), better known as Antonio, is a United Kingdom-based Jamaican reggae singer, primarily recording in the lovers rock style.

Born in Port Antonio, he began performing at the age of twelve, and went on to perform regularly on sound systems such as Mafia Five, Prince Ajax and Missile, initially working under the name Singing Morris. His first recording was "Woman a You Mi Want" for the Black Lion label in 1995. After touring Europe with the Jungle Brothers, he relocated to Birmingham, England in 1998, and began working under the name Antonio. His debut album, So Many Signs, was recorded at Cave studio in London and released in 2000 on Jet Star's Charm label. He since recorded primarily for European labels including the German Sun Vibes Records. His second album, with a working title of So Amazing, is due for release in June 2012.

== Discography ==
- So Many Signs (2000), Jet Star/Charm
- So Amazing (TBC)
