= Ginger Williams =

Ginger Williams may refer to:

- Ginger Williams (singer) (born 1953), Jamaican born British lovers rock singer
- James Williams (Welsh footballer) (1885–1916), Welsh footballer
- Virginia Williams (born 1978), American actress
