= Ambelique =

- Born: Owen George Anthony Silvera c. 1956; Kingston, Jamaica
- Genres: Reggae, lovers rock
- Years active: Late 1960s–present
- Labels: VP, Jet Star

Owen George Anthony Silvera (born c.1956), better known as Ambelique, is a Jamaican reggae singer, primarily working in the lovers rock genre.

== Biography ==
Born in Waltham Park, Kingston, Jamaica, Silvera began his career in the late 1960s, when he worked with Derrick Harriott's 'Musical Chariot' sound system as a deejay under the name Ramon the Mexican, also recording with Harriott's band The Crystallites on the album The Undertaker.

He relocated to The Bronx, New York City and joined Hugh Hendricks and the Buccaneers with whom he toured the United States. He continued to perform but supported himself working as a bank clerk in California. He resumed his music career in 1989 and began a working relationship with Sly & Robbie, with whom he recorded a string of singles, achieving commercial success in the 1990s and beyond.

In 2011, he contributed to the single "We'll Always Be There", in aid of the charity Food for the Poor, along with artist such as J.C. Lodge, Dobby Dobson, Glen Washington, Hopeton Lindo, Sharon Forrester, Barry Biggs, and The Melodians.

== Discography ==
- Sings the Classics (1997), VP
- Love's Got a Hold on Me (2000), Charm
- Shower Me with Love (2002), Angella
- Special Attention (2003), Charm
- Missing You (2003), Jet Star
- Sharing the Night (2008), Cousins
