= Macka B =

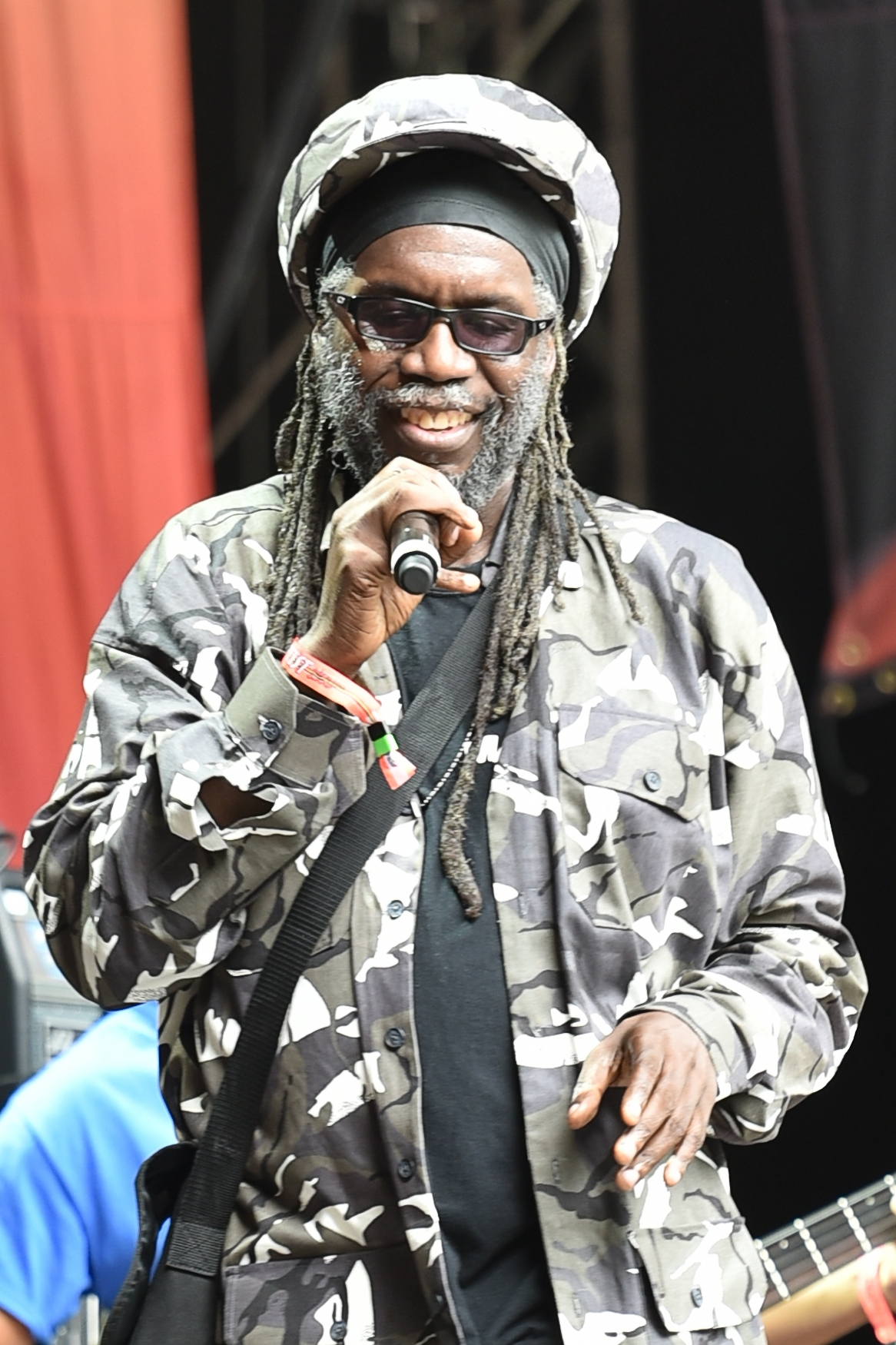
- Macka B at Ruhr Reggae Summer 2017 in Mülheim

Background information
- Born: Christopher MacFarlane; 2 February 1966 (age 60); Wolverhampton, England
- Genre: Reggae
- Years active: Early 1980s–present
- Labels: Ariwa, Jet Star, Pony Canyon
- Website: mackab.com

Christopher MacFarlane, better known as Macka B, (born 1966) is a British-born Jamaican reggae artist, performer and activist with a career spanning thirty years and one of Britain's most influential dancehall DJs.

As a practicing Rastaman, Macka B's music is based around the political and spiritual message of the religion, with an often light and humorous touch. Working with the Mad Professor, he combined dancehall and dub styles of reggae, although he has avoided a more commercial crossover approach. He takes his name from the Judean rebels against the Greeks, the Maccabees.

== Life ==
Born in Wolverhampton to Jamaican parents, as a child Macka B was influenced by the reggae of the Lord Barley sound-system playing at a blues party next to his parents' house; he also played violin and sang in the choir at school. He went on to take a technical apprenticeship at the Ever Ready factory. When the factory closed and he was laid off, he began to devote more time to practising his toasting skills, influenced by earlier Jamaican toasters U-Roy, I-Roy, Big Youth, and especially Prince Far I.

Soon Macka B formed the Exodus sound system with friends and became a Rastafarian. His 1982 trip to Jamaica galvanised his commitment to toasting and the following year he won a DJing competition. After this Macka B began to feature on the radio as well as perform with local band Pre-Wax, who had a hit with "Maggie's Letter". He became a regular performer on Birmingham's Jah Wasifa sound system. He had a weekly slot on the television programme Ebony in 1984. He approached Neil "The Mad Professor" Frasier with a view to recording and after submitting a tape of his work, the producer agreed to produce his first album, beginning a long association. Around the same time, a tape of his performance in a sound-system battle between the Jah Wasifa sound system and Saxon Studio International ended up with Fashion Records in London. The record label gave Macka B the opportunity to record his first solo single, "Bible Reader", which was released in 1985, the first of three singles for the label.

Macka B's first album, Sign of the Times, was released in 1986 on Mad Professor's Ariwa label. The album was well received and reached the top of the UK reggae album charts. Further television exposure followed on the ITV programme Club Mix. His next few albums were similarly acclaimed: We've Had Enough (1987), Looks Are Deceiving (1988). In 1988 Macka B visited Jamaica, where he worked with producer Black Scorpio on the tracks "Love It in Jamaica" and "Slow Down Driver".

Buppie Culture in 1989 produced the hit "Dread a Who She Love", a duet with female singer Kofi. Likewise, "Proud of Mandela" from Natural Suntan (1990) produced another reggae singles chart topper. In 1990 he appeared at the 'Solidarity' concert in Poland, along with the Twinkle Brothers.

Macka B won British Best Male DJ awards in 1991 and 1992. His 1993 record, Roots Ragga was a live album. Here Comes Trouble (1994) produced the international hit "Squeeze Me". "Road Rage" from the Suspicious album was popular on Australian youth radio station Triple J in 1998/9. He again worked with Mad Professor on Discrimination (1995). Roots & Culture (1999) mixed Macka B's hits with previously unreleased material. In 2004 he signed to the Jet Star label (Charm) label.

He also became the first Reggae artist to tour the former Yugoslavia (Slovenia, Croatia, Serbia). In 2012, he appeared as a special guest star on the track Jadna ja (Poor me) by the Serbian folk-world music-rock band Zlatopis.

He has toured and performed around the world since the 1980s alone and with other reggae stars such as Burning Spear, U-Roy, The Wailers, Lee Perry and many others.

== Personal life ==
Macka B follows the Rastafari ital diet, and is vegan. In 2012 he became a patron of The Vegan Society. He runs a YouTube channel where he regularly posts short toasts about the benefits of healthy eating.

== Discography ==
- Sign of the Times (1986), Ariwa
- We've Had Enough (1987), Ariwa
- Looks Are Deceiving (1988), RAS
- Buppie Culture (1989), Ariwa
- Natural Suntan (1990), Ariwa
- Peace Cup (1991), Ariwa
- Roots Ragga (live) (1992), Fotofon/Ar
- Jamaica, No Problem (1992), RAS
- Roots Ragga (live) (1993), Ariwa
- Here Comes Trouble (1994), Ariwa
- Discrimination (1995), Ariwa
- Hold on to Your Culture (1995), Ariwa
- Suspicious (1998), Ariwa
- Roots & Culture (1999), Ariwa
- Global Messenger (2000), Ariwa
- Roots Ragga, Vol. 2 (2002), Ariwa
- By Royal Command (2003), Jet Star
- Word, Sound & Power (2004), Charm
- Who Likes Macka B Music? (2005), Pony Canyon
- Live Tour 2007
- More Knowledge (2008), Humal
- Change The World (2012), Chinelo
- Never Played a 45 (2015), VP
- Health Is Wealth (2017), Greensleeves
- Warrior Style (2020), Ariwa

== Compilations ==
- Yemisi Riddim (2015), Oneness Records
