= The Cimarons =

British reggae band

- Origin: London
- Genres: Reggae, Conscious Roots Reggae, Dub
- Years active: 1967–present
- Labels: Trojan; Polydor; Virgin
- Members: Locksley Gichie; Franklyn Dunn; Michael Arkk (lead singer)
- Past members: Sonny Binns; Winston Reid (Reedy); Lloyd 'Jah Bunny' Donaldson; Maurice Ellis; Carl Levy; Carl Lewis

The Cimarons are a British reggae band formed in 1967. They were the UK's first self-contained indigenous reggae band.

== History ==
As Jamaican natives, they emigrated to London as teenagers. In 1962, Locksley Gichie, then age 13, moved to the UK.

In 1967, Locksley Gichie met Franklyn Dunn in a bus shelter in the rain and subsequently invited Dunn to the youth club in Tavistock Hall, on Tavistock Road, built around 1906, as a Sunday school, for the Methodist Church, High Street, Harlesden, Brent, north-west London.

They took the name, The Cimarons, after a popular American Western series, set in Oklahoma, Cimarron Strip (1967 CBS). The group consisted of Franklyn Dunn (bass), Carl Levy (keyboards), Locksley Gichie (lead guitar), Maurice Ellis (drums) and vocalist Carl Lewis.

In 1968, they played their first gig at Harlesden Cricket Club. Vocalist, Winston Reid (better known as Winston Reedy) joined in 1973. They were primarily session musicians at Trojan Records, and backed many artists, including Jimmy Cliff and Dennis Brown, and performed with Bob Marley in 1972. They performed at the Edinburgh Reggae Festival in 1973, where they also backed Nicky Thomas's performance of Syl Johnson's original, "Is It Because I'm Black". They appeared on Top of the Pops in multiple performances including with Ken Boothe in 1974. They were studio musicians and producers on Boothe's Everything I Own album on certain tracks. The band often appeared under aliases such as the Hot Rod All Stars or the Soul Messengers.

Their first album In Time, released on Trojan Records in 1974 featured a rendition of the O'Jays' "Ship Ahoy", "Utopian Feeling", a Johnny Arthey-arranged version of "Over the Rainbow," and "My Blue Heaven". Vulcan Records, one of the first independent foundation conscious roots reggae and dub labels in the UK and a sister label to the roots rock Grounation record label, released their second album On the Rock two years later, which was recorded both in Jamaica at Lee "Scratch" Perry’s Black Ark Studio, Joseph Hoo Kim's Channel One Studios and Randy Chin's recording studio and in England at London's Chalk Farm Studios. The album included a cover of Bob Marley's "Talking Blues" which charted in Jamaica at the number 1 spot for several weeks where it was released on Tommy Cowan's Talent Corp label. The album also featured a tribute to Paul Bogle, the leader of the 1865 Morant Bay Rebellion who was made a National Hero by the Jamaican government in 1969.

In the late 1970s when punk rock was in ascendance in England, The Cimarons regularly played with bands such as The Clash and Billy Idol's Generation X at a time when the Rock Against Racism movement catalysed and captured the zeitgeist. They switched to Polydor Records, releasing Live at the Roundhouse in 1978. Polydor released Maka the same year. During this period, they did a major British tour supporting Sham 69, who had just released their John Cale-produced debut single. Three more albums followed: Freedom Street, Reggaebility (an album of covers of songs owned by Paul McCartney's publishing company MPL, at the request of McCartney himself), and On the Rock Part 2. After the last of these, in 1983, they did not surface again until 1995 when Lagoon Records released People Say and Reggae Time, both compilations of earlier albums, followed by The Best of the Cimarons, released in 1999 on Culture Press. In the late 1970s and early 1980s, Lloyd 'Jah Bunny' Donaldson was active in the roots reggae and sound system scene, releasing records with Dennis Bovell's Matumbi and with Lincoln "Sugar" Minott, Winston "Tony Tuff" Morris, and Derrick "Bubbles" Howard's Conscious Roots band, The African Brothers, who released vocal and dub discomixes for Greensleeves Records. Winston Reedy went on to a prolific and active solo career, releasing records mostly in the lovers rock, dancehall and conscious roots reggae styles with Gregory Isaacs, Jackie Mittoo, Enos McLeod, Vin Gordon, Joseph Cotton, Mafia & Fluxy, and Dennis Alcapone.

Gichie and Dunn continue to perform as The Cimarons.

== Discography ==
=== Albums ===
- In Time (1974) Trojan
- On the Rock (1976) Vulcan
- Maka (1978) Polydor
- Live (1978) Polydor
- Freedom Street (1980) Virgin
- Reggaebility (1982) Hallmark
- On De Rock Part 2 (1983) Butt (recorded 1976)
- Harder Than The Rock (2025) A-Lone

=== Compilations ===
- People Say (1991) Lagoon (recorded 1974–76)
- Reggae Time Lagoon
- The Best of the Cimarons (1992) Culture Press
- Maroon Land (2001) Rhino
- Reggae Best (2004) Culture Press
- Reggae Masters (2007) Creon

=== Singles ===
- "Funky Fight" (1970) Big Shot
- "Oh Mammy Blue" (1971) Downtown
- "Holy Christmas" (1971) Downtown
- "Struggling Man" (1972) Horse (split 7-inch with The Prophets)
- "Snoopy vs. the Red Baron" (1973) Mooncrest (as The Hotshots) UK No. 4
- "Talking Blues" (No. 1 in Jamaica)
- "Check Out Yourself" Trojan
- "You Can Get It If You Really Want" (1974) Trojan
- "Dim the Light" (1976) Trojan
- "Over the Rainbow" Trojan
- "Harder Than the Rock" (1978) Polydor
- "Mother Earth" (1978) Polydor
- "Willin' (Rock Against Racism)"/"Truly" (1978) Polydor
- "Ready for Love" (1981) Charisma
- "With a Little Luck" (1982) IMP
- "Big Girls Don't Cry" (1982) Safari
- "How Can I Prove Myself to You" (1982)
- "Be My Guest Tonight" (1995)
- "Time Passage" Fontana

The Cimarons also backed several singers on Trojan Records singles, often credited on the B-side with an instrumental version of the A-side.
