= C. J. Lewis =

British reggae singer (born 1967)

- Born: Steven James Lewis; 1 February 1967 (age 59)
- Origin: Peckham, London, England
- Genres: Reggae
- Occupation: Singer
- Instrument: Vocals
- Years active: 1989–present

C. J. Lewis (born Steven James Lewis, 1 February 1967) is a British reggae singer. His biggest hit single was the 1994 cover version of "Sweets for My Sweet". The track was produced by Phillip Leo, as was his debut album, Dollars (UK No. 44). The vocals were performed by Samantha Depasois, a British vocalist who also sang on the tracks "Uptight (Everything's Alright)" and "Best of My Love", and provided the vocals for Dollars. Leo co-wrote original material on Dollars, including "Dollars" (UK No. 34) and "R to the A" (UK No. 34).

== Discography ==
=== Albums ===
Title	Album details	Peak chart positions			Certifications (sales thresholds)
Title	Album details	UK	NLD	NZ	Certifications (sales thresholds)
Dollars	Released: 1994; Label: MCA	44	83	16	
Rough 'N' Smooth	Released: 1995; Label: MCA	—	—	11	
Roadblock	Released: 1998; Label: CNR Music	—	—	—	
Feel My Vibe... The Best of C.J. Lewis	Released: 1998; Label: Universal	—	—	43	

=== Singles ===
Title	Year	Peak chart positions							Album
Title	Year	UK	AUS	BEL	FRA	IRE	NLD	NZ	Album
"Sweets for My Sweet"	1994	3	45	9	69	6	4	3	Dollars
"Uptight (Everything's Alright)"	1994	10	—	24	—	18	19	11	Dollars
"Best of My Love"	1994	13	—	28	—	—	—	11	Dollars
"Dollars"	1994	34	—	—	—	—	—	—	Dollars
"R to the A"	1995	34	—	—	15	—	49	6	Rough 'N' Smooth
"Rough 'N' Smooth"	1996	—	—	—	—	—	—	7	Rough 'N' Smooth
"Left & Right"	1996	—	—	—	—	—	—	31	Rough 'N' Smooth
"Roadblock"	1997	—	—	—	—	—	—	16	Roadblock
