= Winston Reedy =

Jamaican reggae singer (born 1950)

Winston Reedy (born 13 July 1950, Saint Catherine Parish, Jamaica) is a Jamaican reggae singer. Previously vocalist for the Cimarons from 1970, he is best known as a lovers rock vocalist with hits such as "Paradise in Your Eyes", "Moi Emma Oh" and, in particular, "Dim The Lights" (1983), which saw Reid crowned as Britain's best reggae singer three years in a row after he went solo.

Reed appeared alongside Janet Kay, and others on 31 December 2005, at the 'New Year's Eve Gala – Lovers Rock' event at The Banqueting Hall, Station Road, Brixton.

From the late 1970s onwards, Winston Reedy has been active in his solo career, releasing records mostly in the Lovers Rock, dancehall and conscious roots reggae style with Gregory Isaacs, Jackie Mittoo, Enos McLeod, Vin Gordon, Joseph Cotton, Mafia & Fluxy, and Dennis Alcapone, having recorded his work at Channel One Studios, Easy Street Studios, and with 'Crucial' Tony Phillips' Ruff Cutt.

In 2008, a long association with Jet Star Records culminated in the release of the Patrick Donegan-produced, Reality, on their Charm imprint.

In 2012, Reedy performed at the Respect Jamaica 50 series of concerts as part of a deejay special alongside conscious foundation artists, U Roy, Yellowman and Tappa Zukie, celebrating Jamaican independence day.

== Albums ==
- Dim the Light (1983)
- Crossover (1985)
- Love Affair
- Reality (2008)
- Lips And Chalis (2010)
- Make A Change (2012)
- Badaration (2013)

=== Compilations ===
- Love Light: The Best Of
- Gold (1994)
- Love Thing (2005)
- Mother Earth (2008)

=== Single ===
- "Ruff & Tuff" - Production: Two Flames Records (Spain) (2024)
