= Bitty McLean =

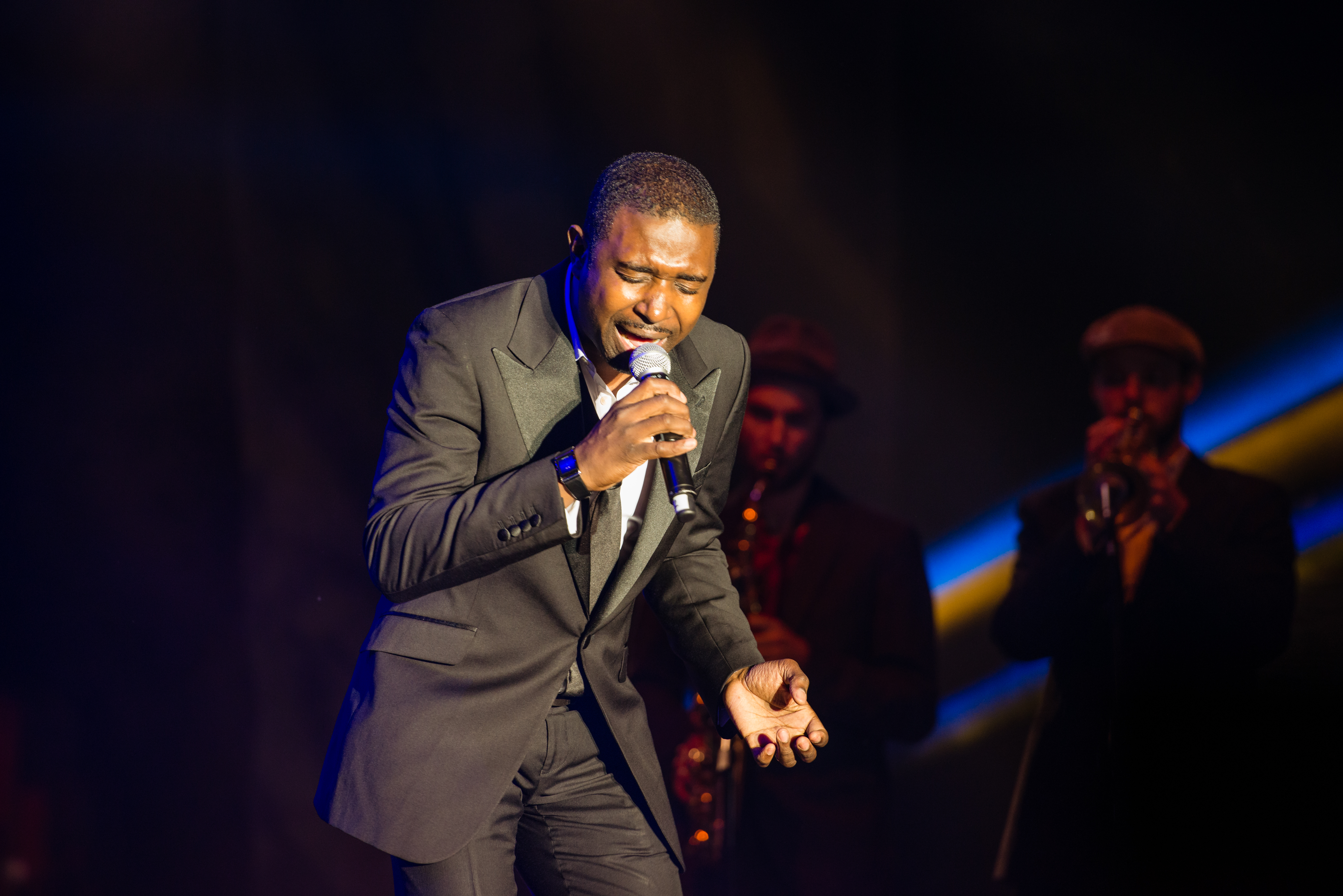
- Bitty MacLean at Ruhr Reggae Summer 2014

Background information
- Born: Delroy Easton McLean; 8 August 1972 (age 53); Birmingham, England
- Genres: Reggae, lovers rock, ragga
- Occupation: Singer
- Instrument: Vocals
- Years active: 1992–present
- Labels: Brilliant Records, Kuff Records, Peckings Records, TAXI, TABOU1
- Website: www.taxitabou1.bandcamp.com

Delroy Easton "Bitty" McLean (born 8 August 1972) is a British reggae, lovers' rock and ragga singer. He is best known for his three UK Top 10 hits in 1993 and 1994, including his debut offering "It Keeps Rainin' (Tears from My Eyes)".

== Career ==
The youngest of six children to Easton and Leonie (née Reynolds), Delroy McLean was nicknamed "Bitty" due to his small stature. As a teenager he performed with local sound systems, and after studying sound engineering at college, he was employed by UB40 as an engineer and producer, and occasionally also sang with the band.

He was most popular around the mid-1990s with cover versions of songs including the Shirelles' "Dedicated to the One I Love" (UK No. 6) and Fats Domino's "It Keeps Rainin' (Tears from My Eyes)" (1993), which was his biggest UK hit, peaking at No. 2. McLean's song "It Keeps Rainin' (Tears from My Eyes)" topped the charts in New Zealand and the Netherlands in 1993. McLean also played on three UK arena tours supporting UB40, Wet Wet Wet and Simply Red respectively.

In 2004, he released the album On Bond Street KGN. JA., which featured his vocals recorded over vintage Tommy McCook and Duke Reid-produced, Treasure Isle rhythms from the rocksteady era, most with new lyrics of his own, but also using David Ruffin's "Walk Away from Love" and David Gates' "Make It with You". He recorded a studio album in 2007, entitled Movin' On, with Sly and Robbie at their One Pop studios in Kingston, Jamaica. Movin' On was released on the Taxi / Silent River / TABOU1 label in Europe and the US, while JVC released it in Japan. McLean and Sly & Robbie toured Japan, Europe and Morocco in 2008 and 2009. In 2013, McLean released a new album, The Taxi Sessions, with Sly & Robbie, and a live DVD recorded with Sly & Robbie and the Taxi Gang, during their concert in Paris in May 2009. Also in 2013, McLean joined The Lee Thompson Ska Orchestra on vocals, for a cover of Desmond Dekker's "Fu Man Chu" (a single release for the band). He also joined them on stage for several shows, appeared in the official video that accompanied the single and, in May 2013, joined them on Later... with Jools Holland to perform the track.

In 2017, he and producer Guillaume Bougard traveled to Philadelphia to deliver lectures at the Westphal School of Music at Drexel University, consistently ranked as one of the top music programs in the US, to present Jamaican music production techniques, as well as to start working on a new soul music project in collaboration with New York based publishing house Reservoir. In 2018, he released the album Love Restart. The LP featured six extended mixes of previously unreleased tracks, while the CD edition features the same six tracks in their regular length plus five extra songs. The digital edition features the six extended mixes from the LP and the five other tracks from the CD. Produced with Sly & Robbie and Guillaume Bougard, and mastered at Abbey Road Studios, Love Restart came out on August 21, 2018 on TABOU1's bandcamp store and was distributed worldwide from September 2018. McLean toured Europe with Sly & Robbie in August 2018 to promote the new album. Following Robbie Shakespeare's death in December 2021, McLean put the soul project on the back burner and recorded an album over riddims produced by Dunbar and Shakespeare as a tribute to the latter. This 11 track album named Forward was released on April 14, 2023.

== Personal life ==
He is uncle to footballer Aaron McLean and singer Anthony, under the artist name of "McLean".

== Discography ==
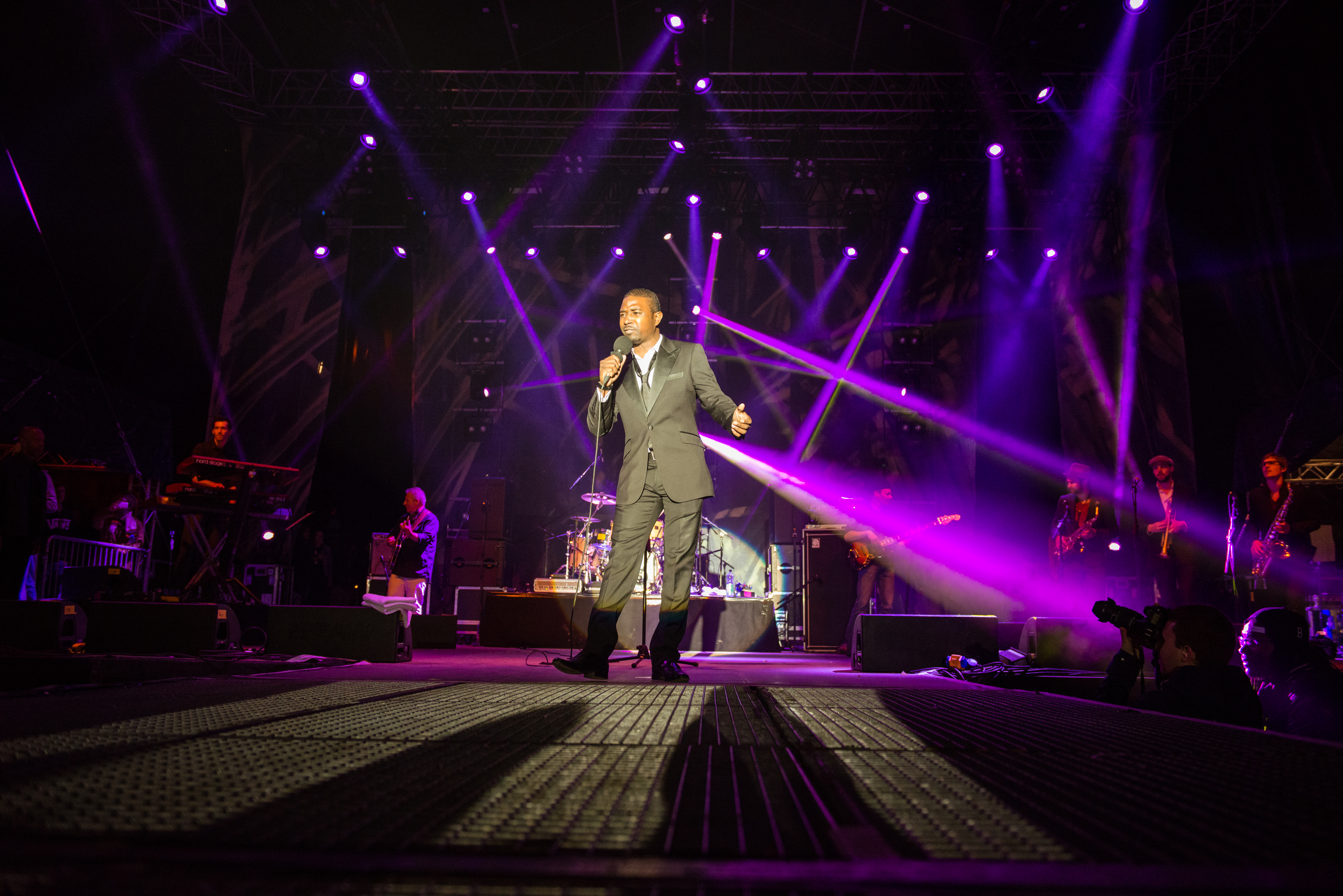
Bitty MacLean at Ruhr Reggae Summer 2014

=== Albums ===
- Just to Let You Know... (1994) – UK No. 19
- Natural High (1995) – UK No. 81
- Soul to Soul (2003)
- On Bond Street KGN. JA. (2005)
- Made in Jamaica (2007)
- Movin' On (2009)
- The Taxi Sessions (2013)
- Love Restart (2018)
- Forward (2023)

=== EPs ===
- Heart Mind Soul (2015)
- War Is Over/Rumours (2016)

=== Singles ===
- "It Keeps Rainin' (Tears from My Eyes)" (1993) – UK No. 2, AUS No. 83
- "Pass It On" (1993) – UK No. 35
- "Here I Stand" (1994) – UK No. 10
- "Dedicated to the One I Love" (1994) – UK No. 6
- "What Goes Around" (1994) – UK No. 36
- "Over the River" (1995) – UK No. 27
- "We've Only Just Begun" (1995) – UK No. 23
- "Nothing Can Change This Love" (1995) – UK No. 55
- "Natural High" (1996) – UK No. 63
- "She's Alright" (1996) – UK No. 53
- "Walk Away from Love" (2004)
- "The Real Thing" (2005)
- "Let Them Talk" (2006)
- "Got to Let Go" (2008)
- "Let Them Say" (2022)

== See also ==
- List of performers on Top of the Pops
- List of lovers rock artists
