= Winsome =

Winsome is a given name, and may refer to:

- Winsome Andante (1993-2019), a British sport horse
- Winsome Cripps (1931-1997), Australian sprinter
- Winsome Douglas (1919-2016), British embroiderer and teacher
- Winsome Earle-Sears (born 1964), Jamaican-American politician
- Winsome Evans (born 1941), Australian early music specialist
- Winsome Fanny Barker (23 September 1907 – 27 December 1994), South African botanist
- Winsome Hall Andrew 1905-1997), Australian architect
- Winsome McCaughey, Lord Mayor of Melbourne from 1988 to 1989
- Winsome Pinnock (born 1961), British playwright
- Winsome Sears (born 1964), American politician
- Winsome Sinclair (1965–2024), Jamaican-born American casting director and film producer
- Wincey Willis (born 1948), born Florence Winsome Leighton, British television personality and weather presenter
- Winsome Witch, fictional title character of an animated cartoon series

== See also ==
- "Winsome" (song), a 1984 reggae song by Half Pint covered in 1986 by the Rolling Stones as "Too Rude"
