= Mike Anthony (singer) =

British lovers rock singer

- Born: Lewisham, London, England
- Origin: England
- Genre: Reggae
- Instrument: Vocalist

Mike Anthony is a British lovers rock singer, who began his career in the late 1980s.

== History ==
Born Michael Sinclair to Jamaican parents in Lewisham, London, England.

Anthony's early recordings were produced by Barry Boom, and he had a reggae top ten hit with "Crash Crash", which was followed by further successes with "Glide Gently", "Cruising in Love", and "Open Your Heart". He moved on to Fashion Records and had another hit with "Still Your Number One", before topping the reggae chart for several weeks with a cover of David Ruffin's "Walk Away From Love". Further hits in the UK reggae chart followed throughout the 1990s and 2000s with songs such as "No Halfway Love", "Spread Love", "Sexy Eyes", "How Long", "Don't Play Games", and "Call Me". Along with Peter Hunnigale, Anthony has achieved virtual superstar status among lovers rock followers, and has appeared at Jamaica's Reggae Sunsplash festival.

== Album discography ==
- The Album, Juggling
- Short of Nothing (1992), Merger
- Back 4 More (1996), Gussie P
- Natural (2000), Gussie P
