= Gene Rondo =

- Born: Winston Lara; 28 May 1943; Greenwich Farm, Kingston, Jamaica
- Died: 12 June 1994 (aged 51) Hackney, London, England
- Genres: Reggae
- Years active: Late 1950s–mid-1980s
- Labels: Downtown, Trojan, Magnet,

Winston Lara (28 May 1943 – 12 June 1994), better known by his stage name Gene Rondo, was a Jamaican reggae singer. After first recording as part of the duo Gene & Roy in Jamaica, he relocated to London where he continued to record until the 1980s, including several album releases in the 1970s, both solo and as a member of The Undivided. He was sometimes credited as Gene Laro or Winston Laro.

== Biography ==
Born in Greenwich Farm, Kingston, Jamaica in 1943, Rondo entered the music business in the late 1950s, successfully competing in the Vere Johns Opportunity Hour talent content with his partner Satch. He recorded a single in Jamaica as part of the duo Gene & Roy ("Little Queenie"/"Squeeze Me"), before relocating to London in 1962, where he studied as a classical singer in Hammersmith.

In 1965 he formed the band Abashack, with whom he toured the UK, and went on to record singles on the Giant and Jolly labels of Stamford Hill-based R&B Records in 1968. He then recorded for Dandy Livingstone's Trojan Records sub-label Downtown, releasing several singles in 1969 and 1970. In 1970 he recorded his debut album, On My Way, for Trojan. He went on to record for Magnet Records, including contributing four tracks to the Reggae Desire album in 1974.

In 1972 he formed the pop-reggae band The Undivided (which later evolved into Undivided Roots), who released an album (Listen to the World) for Decca. He also recorded as a solo reggae vocalist for several UK-based producers including Clement Bushay, Dennis Harris (for whom he recorded duets with T.T. Ross), and Count Shelly. Rondo accompanied Susan Cadogan for her performance of "Hurt So Good" on Top of the Pops.

In the mid-1970s, Rondo adopted the Rastafari faith, and recorded more roots-oriented tracks such as "A Land Far Away" and "Give All the Parise to Jah". Rondo co-produced (with Bunny Lee) Delroy Wilson's Nice Times album in 1983 and contributed backing vocals to Alton Ellis's 25th Silver Jubilee album in 1984. He continued to record into the 1980s, and also set up the Roots Pool community centre and studio in North London. He was a major contributor to the British Reggae Artists Famine Appeal (BRAFA) and the charity single "Let's Make Africa Green Again", which raised funds for the Save the Children Fund. He continued to concentrate on community work in the latter half of the 1980s and early 1990s.

Rondo died from cancer in St Josephs Hospice, Hackney in June 1994. A memorial concert was held featuring artists such as Alton Ellis, Prince Lincoln, Justin Hinds, Dennis Alcapone, Owen Gray, and Carroll Thompson.

== Discography ==
=== Albums ===
- On My Way (1970), Trojan
- Memories (1977), Venture

=== Singles ===
- "Little Queenie"/"Squeeze Me" (1961), Magico – Gene & Roy
- "Grey Lies" (1968), Giant – with Herbie Gray and the Cool-Tans
- "Mary Mary"/"Baby Baby" (1968), Jolly
- "Lover's Question" (1969), Downtown
- "Sentimental Reason" (1969), Downtown
- "Spreading Peace" (1970), Downtown
- "Goodnight My Love" (1970), Downtown – credited to Winston Laro
- "I Need Your Love" (1970), Bread – credited to Gene Laro, B-side of "Susanne" by Del Davis
- "Happy Birthday Sweet Sixteen" (1972), Count Shelly
- "Wanna Be Like Daddy" (1972), Downtown
- "Each Moment" (1973), Magnet
- "Prisoner of Love" (1973), Magnet
- "This is Love" (1973), Magnet
- "Rebel Woman" (1974), Queen Bee
- "A Different World" (1974), RG
- "Valley of Tears" (1974), Magnet
- "Oh Sweet Africa" (197?), Magnet
- "Reggae Desire" (197?), Magnet
- "Jim Dandy" (1975), Jamatel
- "Impossible Dream" (1975), Faith
- "Declaration of Rights" (1975), Third World – B-side of "Buggis Mood" by Buggis
- "Little Things Mean A Lot" (1975), Dip – Gene Rondo & T.T. Ross
- "Miss Grace" (1975), Wild Flower – Gene Rondo & T.T. Ross
- "My Dream is Yours" (1975), Comedy International
- "If I Could Say What's on My Mind" (1975), Comedy International
- "Try Me" (197?), Dip
- "Ramblin' Man" (1976), Trojan
- "Domestic Affair" (1977), Third World
- "Time" (1978), Trans Universal – with the Star-Keys, B-side of Dennis Alcapone's "Truth & Rights"
- "Jah Jah Worker" (1978), Burning Sounds – with Militant Barry
- "Golden Love" (1977), Paradise
- "If I Would Say" (1979), Pentagon
- "In My Life" (1979), Jamaica Sound/RCA Victor
- "Since I Fell For You"/"If You Take My Love" (1979), Jamaica Sound
- "Something on My Mind" (197?), Jamaica Sound – Gene Laro & Dillinger
- "No One But You" (1985), Roots Pool
- "Miss Grace", Music Scene
- "Yah Mo Be There (Jah Will Be There)" (1987), BMDI

=== Compilation appearances ===
- Reggae Desire (1974), Magnet: "Pretty Blue Eyes", "This Is Love", "Mary Mary", "Oh Sweet Africa"
