= It Keeps Rainin' =

1961 song by Fats Domino

- Italian release picture sleeve

Single by Fats Domino

from the album I Miss You So
- B-side: "I Just Cry"
- Released: May 1961
- Recorded: December 28, 1960
- Length: 2:43
- Label: Imperial
- Songwriters: D. Bartholomew, A. Domino, R. Guidry
- Producer: Dave Bartholomew

Fats Domino singles chronology
"Fell in Love On Monday" (1961)	"It Keeps Rainin'" (1961)	"Let the Four Winds Blow" (1961)

"It Keeps Rainin'" is a song recorded by American singer-songwriter and pianist Fats Domino in 1961 and written by Domino, Dave Bartholomew and Bobby Charles. It was released in the US on Imperial Records and in the UK on London Records as the B-side of "I Just Cry". The song was covered by Bitty McLean in 1993, becoming a chart success in Europe and New Zealand.

== Overview ==
"It Keeps Rainin'" was one of the series of Bobby Charles songs that Fats Domino recorded along with songs such as "Walking to New Orleans". Originally Charles wrote it with different lyrics under the name "Little Rascal". Charles prepared a demo with a rhythm track and it was sent to Domino who was in Detroit for a show. Somehow the vocals were left off from the tape, and Domino wrote new lyrics to the rhythm track to complete the song “It Keeps Rainin’”. Charles claims that his lyrics were better, but his original version has not been released.

== Personnel ==
Personnel are taken from The Blues Discography 1943–1970 The Classic Years.

- Fats Domino – vocals, piano
- Clarence Ford – baritone saxophone
- Robert "Buddy" Hagans – tenor saxophone
- Lee Allen – tenor saxophone
- Dave Bartholomew – trumpet
- Roy Montrell – guitars
- Jimmy Davis – bass
- Cornelius "Tenoo" Coleman – drums

== Charts ==
Chart (1961)	Peak position
UK Singles (OCC)	49
US Billboard Hot 100	23
US Hot R&B/Hip-Hop Songs (Billboard)	18

== Bitty McLean version ==
"It Keeps Rainin' (Tears from My Eyes)"

Single by Bitty McLean

from the album Just to Let You Know...
- B-side: "True True True"
- Released: July 19, 1993
- Genre: Reggae; pop
- Length: 3:45
- Label: Brilliant!
- Songwriters: Fats Domino; Dave Bartholomew; Bobby Charles
- Producer: Bitty McLean

Bitty McLean singles chronology
"It Keeps Rainin' (Tears from My Eyes)" (1993)	"Pass It On" (1993)

Music video
- "It Keeps Rainin' (Tears From My Eyes)" on YouTube

British-Jamaican musician Bitty McLean covered the song as "It Keeps Rainin' (Tears from My Eyes)" and released it on July 19, 1993, from his debut album, Just to Let You Know... (1993). Produced by McLean, the single peaked at number two in the United Kingdom and was a big hit across Europe, reaching number one in the Netherlands. It also peaked at number one in New Zealand for seven weeks and was certified platinum for sales of over 10,000. The accompanying music video for "It Keeps Rainin' (Tears from My Eyes)" was directed by David Betteridge and first aired in July 1993.

=== Critical reception ===
Larry Flick from Billboard magazine wrote, "The British reggae invasion continues. Former UB40 backing vocalist McLean doesn't stray from that group's winning formula on his solo debut. This is easy-listening reggae, complete with a smooth backbeat and an aloof British vocal. File this between UB40 and Maxi-Priest." Troy J. Augusto from Cash Box described it as "lightweight pop-reggae", that "offers little innovation but enough awareness of what makes a good radio song to earn a few spins at urban and hit outlets." Caroline Sullivan from The Guardian viewed it as "imaginative". Pan-European magazine Music & Media commented, "Just like his "bosses" from UB 40 for whom he's backup singer on their current Elvis cover and album, Bitty has dived into rock 'n' roll's rich archives to return with a Fats Domino tune in a new spicy reggae identity." Mark Frith from Smash Hits deemed it "a clever, innovative record that was really catchy and a deserved big hit." Another Smash Hits editor, Tony Cross, said it "will keep you bogling till your bogle drops off."

=== Track listings ===
CD single, UK (1993)
No.	Title	Length
1.	"It Keeps Rainin'" (radio edit)	3:46
2.	"It Keeps Rainin'" (No Bitty mix)	3:46
3.	"True True True"	3:24

CD single, Scandinavia (1993)
No.	Title	Length
1.	"It Keeps Rainin'" (radio edit)
2.	"It Keeps Rainin'" (No Bitty mix)

CD maxi, Germany, Austria and Switzerland (1993)
No.	Title	Length
1.	"It Keeps Rainin'" (radio edit)	3:46
2.	"It Keeps Rainin'" (No Bitty mix)	3:46
3.	"True True True"	3:24

=== Charts ===
==== Weekly charts ====
Chart (1993–1994)	Peak position
Australia (ARIA)	83
Austria (Ö3 Austria Top 40)	5
Belgium (Ultratop 50 Flanders)	3
Europe (Eurochart Hot 100)	8
Europe (European Hit Radio)	18
Germany (GfK)	31
Iceland (Íslenski Listinn Topp 40)	2
Ireland (IRMA)	5
Netherlands (Dutch Top 40)	1
Netherlands (Single Top 100)	1
New Zealand (Recorded Music NZ)	1
Spain (AFYVE)	16
Sweden (Sverigetopplistan)	29
UK Singles (OCC)	2
UK Airplay (Music Week)	5

==== Year-end charts ====
Chart (1993)	Position
Belgium (Ultratop)	45
Europe (Eurochart Hot 100)	61
Iceland (Íslenski Listinn Topp 40)	36
Netherlands (Dutch Top 40)	14
Netherlands (Single Top 100)	30
New Zealand (RIANZ)	26
Sweden (Topplistan)	98
UK Singles (OCC)	24
UK Airplay (Music Week)	22

=== Certifications ===
Region	Certification	Certified units/sales
New Zealand (RMNZ)	Platinum	10,000^{*}
United Kingdom (BPI)	Silver	200,000^{^}
^{*} Sales figures based on certification alone.^{^} Shipments figures based on certification alone.

=== Release history ===
Region	Date	Format(s)	Label(s)	Ref.
United Kingdom	July 19, 1993	7-inch vinyl; 12-inch vinyl; CD; cassette	Brilliant!	
Australia	October 4, 1993	CD; cassette	Liberation; Brilliant!	

== Other covers ==
The song was released in September 28, 2025 under the title "It's Raining" by Dutch dj Ziggy in tha House.
