= Just to Let You Know... =

Studio album by Bitty McLean
- Released: 1993
- Genre: Reggae, reggae-pop
- Length: 43:44
- Label: Brilliant Records; Virgin Records
- Producer: Bitty McLean

Bitty McLean chronology
Just to Let You Know... (1993)	Natural High (1995)

Professional ratings
Review scores
Source	Rating
AllMusic	3/5 stars
The Encyclopedia of Popular Music	3/5 stars
The Observer	(favorable)
Select	1/5 medals
Smash Hits	3/5 stars

Just to Let You Know... is the debut album by the British/Jamaican reggae artist Bitty McLean, released in 1993 by Brilliant Records and re-released by Virgin Records in 1994. It reached number 19 on the UK Albums Chart.

Several singles from the album charted, including "It Keeps Raining" (UK #2), "Pass It On" (UK #35), "Here I Stand" (UK #10), "Dedicated to the One I Love" (UK #6) and "What Goes Around" (UK #36).

== Critical reception ==
The Independent wrote that "the result may not set the world on fire, but Bitty is nevertheless a welcome addition to the UK reggae scene."

== Track listing ==
1. "Here I Stand" (Justin Hinds) – 3:37
2. "What Goes Round (Comes Around)" (Bitty McLean) – 3:42
3. "True True True" (Ken Parker) – 3:22
4. "I've Got Love" (Bitty McLean) – 4:14
5. "Stop This World" (Leroy Sibbles) – 4:09
6. "It Keeps Raining" (Dave Bartholomew, Fats Domino, Robert Guidry) – 3:45
7. "Dedicated to the One I Love" (Ralph Bass, Lowman Pauling) – 3:53
8. "Forever Be Mine" (Bitty McLean) – 3:55
9. "Talkin' to the Wind" (Norman Whitfield) – 3:48
10. "Pass It On" (Jean Watt) – 5:04
11. "Pass It On (Reprise)" (Jean Watt) – 4:15
