= Kofi (musician) =

British lovers rock singer (born 1961)

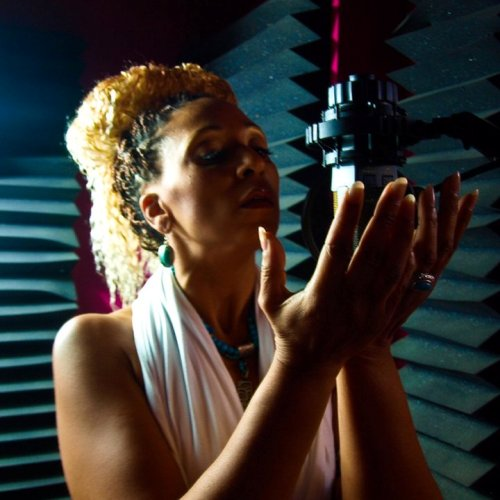

Background information
- Born: Carol Simms; 1961 (age 64–65); Lambeth, London, England
- Genres: Lovers rock, reggae, soul, R&B
- Occupations: Singer, songwriter, musician
- Years active: 1976–present
- Labels: Ariwa, Cousins, Koffe an Kreem
- Website: koffeankreem.com/kofi

Carol Simms, better known as Kofi, is a British lovers rock singer who was a member of the group Brown Sugar prior to embarking on a solo career.

== Early life ==
Simms was born in 1961 in Lambeth, South London, the third youngest of six children. With her Church Of God upbringing, and with the sound of everything from ska, reggae, jazz and soul emanating from the family home, Simms' love of music was enhanced, and after a brief flirtation with acting during which she attended drama school, her urge to make music began to dominate. At fourteen Simms wrote to the local newspaper, the South London Press, and an article about her wanting to become a singer was featured.

== Musical career ==
Simms first found success as a member of the Lovers rock trio Brown Sugar (which also featured Caron Wheeler and Pauline Catlin). The trio enjoyed unprecedented success, topping the UK reggae charts on three occasions. Brown Sugar's first chart-topper in 1977, "I'm in Love With a Dreadlocks", was also the first release on the new Lover's Rock record label formed by Dennis Harris, John Kpiaye and Dennis Bovell. The record label title became the adopted definition for the genre of music. Simms and Wheeler were re-united briefly in October 2005 at the Metropolitan Black Police Association's annual gala at The Barbican in London.

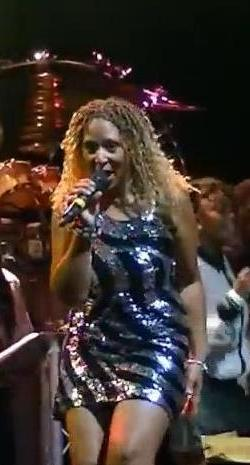
Live at The Giants of Lovers Rock event October 2012

Following the demise of Brown Sugar in the mid-1980s, Simms, under the moniker of Kofi, embarked on a solo career, initially with Mad Professor and releasing three albums on his Ariwa Sound label. She had hits on the British reggae charts with the reworking of Brown Sugar songs "I Am So Proud", "I'm in Love With a Dreadlocks" and "Black Pride", with new songs such as "Didn't I" (on which Kofi also played bass guitar), "Looking Over Love", and with a version of Al Green's "I'm Still in Love with You", a duet with John McLean."Proud of Mandela", a version of The Impressions' "I'm So Proud", a collaboration with Macka B, topped the British reggae charts in 1990. The 1988 British Reggae Industry Awards ceremony saw Kofi winning the awards for "Best Female Vocalist" and reaching number one with the songs "Didn't I" and "Black Pride". Kofi went on to achieve further awards in 1989, establishing her status as one of the queens of Lovers rock.

Kofi had been asked crossover into the soul/R&B market and she began to write some of her own work directly aimed at that genre of music. The opportunity arose through association with Jazzie B of Soul II Soul. Motown Records had engaged Jazzie B to establish a subsidiary label, Funki Dreds to which he was to find and sign artists in the UK; Kofi was signed to the new label and featured on the 1992 Soul II Soul Volume III – Just Right album with the tracks "Move Me No Mountain" and "Future". The only single release by Kofi during this period was in 1992 with the song "Step By Step".

During her time with Motown, Kofi was commissioned to work for a musical project put together by Disney/Buena Vista. The Simply Mad About the Mouse: A Musical Celebration of Imagination project was a musical tribute to some of the company's films, and as such they marked the occasion by featuring various artists to each take a famous song from one of their films and perform it in their own style. This included LL Cool J, Gipsy Kings, Michael Bolton and Billy Joel. Kofi's contribution to the project was her rendition of "Kiss The Girl" from the film The Little Mermaid.

Kofi went on to work more closely with producers Mafia & Fluxy. As well as the inclusion of songs on a number of compilation albums, in 2008 the album Rocking Eternally was released. The 2011 album Kofi & Friends showcased Kofi in a more roots reggae mood and sharing the album with established reggae artists: Freddie McGregor, Luciano, Michael Rose, George Nooks, Morgan Heritage and Earl Sixteen. During 2011, the film The Story of Lovers Rock, directed by Menelik Shabazz, was publicly released and featured Kofi in conversation and music from Brown Sugar.

In 2010 Kofi took up residency in Barbados performing various music styles to meet audience expectations at many hotels and locations around the island. 2012 saw her not only working with new producers, but also the release of a new EP, Sweetness & Thanks, and a number of singles in various genres. The album Rocking Eternally was also re-released.

Kofi performed as the closing act at The Giants of Lovers Rock event in 2012 alongside solo shows. The following year, appeared alongside Sanchez, John Holt and Frankie Paul at the Barbados Reggae Festival and also appeared at the St Lucia Jazz Festival in the same year.

During 2016 Kofi returned to the UK for an indefinite period to complete work on a new album and a number of singles which will reflect her various musical styles with songs in the Soul/R&B, Reggae and Jazz genres.

== Discography ==
=== Albums ===
- Black...With Sugar (1989, Ariwa)
- Wishing Well (1992, Ariwa)
- Friday's Child (1994, Ariwa)
- Rocking Eternally (2008, Cousins; 2012, Mafia & Fluxy)
- Kofi and Friends (2011, Cousins)

== Awards ==
- 1988 BRIA award for reaching number 1 with "Didn't I" and "Black Pride"
- 1988 BRIA award "Best Female Vocalist"
- 1989 BRIA award for reaching number 1 with "Dread A Who She Love" and "Proud of Mandela"
- 1989 Jamaica Gleaner Awards "Best British Female Singer"
- 1990 Entertainments Enterprise Annual Celebrity Awards "Best Female Singer" – for outstanding contribution to the entertainment industry
- 2009 BRIA "Reggae Achievement Award"
- 2011 HiCrEc Award "Best Female Vocalist"
