= Trevor Walters (singer) =

British lovers rock reggae singer (born 1961)

Trevor Walters (born 1961, London, England) is a British lovers rock reggae singer. His version of "Stuck on You" was a bigger hit on the UK Singles Chart than Lionel Richie's original.

== Discography ==
=== Albums ===
Year	Title
1985	Walters Gold with Love (Label: Adelphi Records – ADE LP 001)

=== Singles ===
Year	Title	UK Singles Chart
1981	"Love Me Tonight"	#27
1984	"Stuck on You"	#9
1984	"Never Let Her Slip Away"	#73
