= Ginger Williams (singer) =

Jamaican-born British lovers rock singer (born 1953)

- Born: 1953 (age 72–73); Jamaica
- Genres: Lovers rock
- Years active: Early 1970s–present
- Labels: Paradise, BB, Third World
- Formerly of: Green Mango

Ginger Williams (born 1953) is a Jamaican-born British lovers rock singer who was one of the earliest exponents of the genre.

== Career ==
Born in Jamaica in 1953, Williams moved with her family to London in 1962. She joined the group Green Mango in her mid-teens and embarked on a solo career after meeting producer Ronnie Williams. She worked with Williams on her debut single "I Can't Resist Your Tenderness", considered one of the earliest lovers rock releases, which reached number one on the British reggae charts. This was followed by "In My Heart There Is A Place", which was also a success on the reggae charts. She went on to work with producer Dennis Harris on "Tenderness" and began a long working relationship with Bill Campbell, releasing "Oh Baby Come Back", "I'll Still Love You", "I'm Just A Girl", and a duet they recorded together, "The Vow". Her debut album, Strange World, was released in 1977. She continued to have occasional hits on the reggae charts and in 1996 the compilation album The First Lady of Lovers Rock was released.

== Discography ==
=== Albums ===
- Strange World (1977), BB
- Love Me Tonight (1990), Cougar
- Cool Loving, B&B

Compilations

- I Can't Resist Your Tenderness, Rover - Ginger Williams and Various Artists
- Greatest Hits: The First Lady of Lovers Rock (1996), World Sound

=== Singles ===
- "I Can't Resist Your Tenderness" (1975), Paradise
- "Oh Baby Come Back", BB
- "I Still Love You" (1976), BB
- "The Vow" (1976), BB - with Bill Campbell
- "I'm Just a Girl", BB
- "In My Heart There's a Place", Paradise
- "Your Love Is Driving Me Crazy", Paradise
