= Livin' in the Light =

Single by Caron Wheeler

from the album UK Blak
- Released: 27 August 1990
- Recorded: 1990
- Genre: Electronica; soul
- Length: 5:44 (original version); 4:55 (remix version)
- Label: EMI
- Songwriters: Caron Wheeler; N. P. Hail
- Producers: Caron Wheeler; Afrika Baby Bam; Blacksmith

Caron Wheeler singles chronology
| "Livin' in the Light" (1990) | "UK Blak" (1990) |

Music video
- "Livin' in the Light" on YouTube

"Livin' in the Light" is a song by British singer-songwriter Caron Wheeler, released in August 1990 by EMI Records as the first single from her debut solo album, UK Blak (1990). Wheeler wrote the song with N. P. Hail, and produced it with Afrika Baby Bam and Blacksmith. Its lyrics describe people being dragged away from their culture and having to survive within a new surrounding. The song references slavery and reparations.

== Background ==
EMI Records released "Livin' in the Light" on 27 August 1990 as the lead single from UK Blak. The song spent a total of six weeks on the chart and peaked number 14 on the UK Singles chart. It was a number-one hit on the US Billboard Dance Club Songs chart, and achieved top-twenty peaks on several other countries' record charts. The song went on to sell over thirty-thousand copies worldwide. The success of the song invited Wheeler to perform on Top of the Pops in mid-1990.

== Critical reception ==
In his review of UK Blak, Alex Henderson from AllMusic described "Livin' in the Light" as a "riveting" and "moving" neosoul treasure. J.D. Considine from The Baltimore Sun remarked its "bass-heavy pulse". Bill Coleman from Billboard magazine wrote, "Produced by Afrika Baby Bam of the Jungle Brothers, lyrically uplifting cut shuffles down a funk/swing groove path somewhat similar to SIIS, though Wheeler's own unique sense of melody and vocal arrangements ultimately shine through. A smash." Andrew Mueller from Melody Maker said that Wheeler "has a perfectly splendid voice and sings some perfectly splendid things with it".

== Music video ==
A music video was shot for both the original version and the remix version of the song. The video for the original version of song features Wheeler performing the song in close-up frame shots. The imagery of the video showcases many African people in a new surrounding. As they learning to adapt to the new surrounding, many of them are shown on a beach with the sun shining on them. The video also features many different men in the water. Wheeler is also shown wearing a traditional reddish-orange outfit. The video for the remix version of the song features a similar video with the same settings and imagery.

== Formats and track listings ==
- UK single CD Single
1. Livin' In The Light (The Larger Than Light Mix) – 6:56
2. Livin' In The Light (Red Zone Mix) – 6:16
3. Livin' In The Light (The Sensual Mix) – 5:42
- UK Vinyl, 7" Single
1. Livin' In The Light (7") – 4:33
2. Livin' In The Light (The Original Story) – 4:55
- US Maxi-CD single
1. Livin' In The Light (Brixton Bass 12" Mix)
2. Meewonjammin'
3. Livin' In The Light (The Original Story)
4. Livin' In The Light (Single)
- European CD Single
1. Livin' In The Light (7") – 4:33
2. Livin' In The Light (The Original Story) – 4:55
3. Livin' In The Light (Brixton Bass Mix) – 8:52

== Charts ==
=== Weekly charts ===
| Chart (1990–1991) | Peak position |
|---|---|
| Australia (ARIA) | 112 |
| Belgium (Ultratop 50 Flanders) | 31 |
| Europe (Eurochart Hot 100) | 38 |
| Luxembourg (Radio Luxembourg) | 11 |
| Netherlands (Dutch Top 40) | 11 |
| Netherlands (Single Top 100) | 26 |
| New Zealand (Recorded Music NZ) | 43 |
| UK Singles (OCC) | 14 |
| UK Club Chart (Record Mirror) | 1 |
| US Hot Dance Club Play (Billboard) | 1 |
| US Cash Box Top 100 | 45 |
| West Germany (Official German Charts) | 46 |

=== Year-end charts ===
| Chart (1990) | Position |
|---|---|
| UK Club Chart (Record Mirror) | 8 |

== See also ==
- List of number-one dance singles of 1990 (U.S.)
