= Phillip Leo =

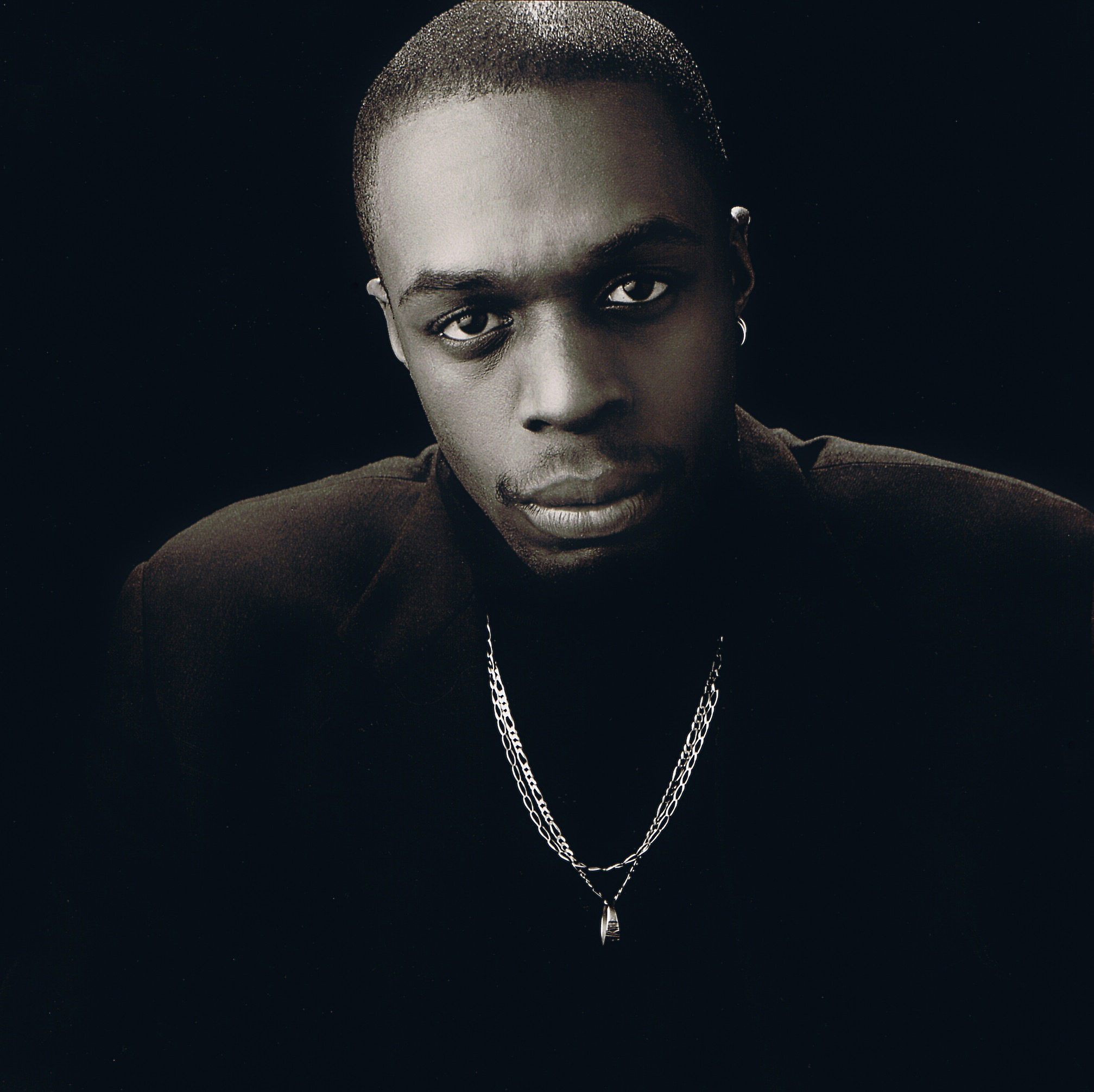

Background information
- Born: Philip Ernest Pottinger; 29 April 1967 (age 58); Greenwich, London, UK
- Origin: Peckham, South London
- Genres: Reggae, soul, R&B, reggae fusion
- Occupations: Singer, songwriter, record producer
- Instruments: Vocals, keyboards, guitar
- Years active: 1988–present
- Labels: Fashion, Finestyle, Breakin' Loose, Sharma Productions, EMI, Big Lion Productions
- Website: www.biglionproductions.com

Philip Ernest Pottinger (born 29 April 1967), known professionally as Phillip Leo, is a British reggae singer, songwriter and producer. He is the last of five children from South London who were born to Jamaican parents.

== Biography ==
Born in Greenwich, he played in the Sir Roger Manwood's School's steel band, and learned drums and keyboard. In February 1988 Phillip Leo signed with UK label Fashion Records as a singer/songwriter. By September of that year he had reached No. 6 in the UK Reggae Charts with his first single, "Rocking the Night Away"/"Food of Love".

Leo went on to establish himself as songwriter/producer, with a string of reggae hits by other Fashion acts, including the no. 1 hit single "Two Timing Lover" by Janet Lee Davis, "Crazy Feeling" by Peter Spence, "Lets Show the World" by Nerious Joseph, and producing the lovers duo Zuruchi's first single "Celebrate Our Love", winning Reggae Songwriter of the Year two consecutive years in row in 1989 and 1990. Leo also did sessions on drum programming, keyboards and backing vocals on a string of recordings by artists like Barry Boom, Nerious Joseph, and Cutty Ranks, and also producing two songs for the Sandra Cross album Foundation Of Love.

As an artist in his own right, Leo reached no. 2 with "I Wanna be Loved by You". He then produced the hit singles "Why do Fools Fall in Love", "Good Thing Going", and "Young, Gifted & Black", which were duets with DJ CJ Lewis. His debut album in January 1990, entitled Lover of Music, which included nine of his own original compositions, reached no. 3 in the Reggae Album Chart and featured top ten reggae singles "I'm Missing You", "We Belong Together" (duet with Marie Dawn) and debut single "Rocking The Night Away".

Leo began a writing partnership with bassist/songwriter Steve Bingham and together they wrote over 170 songs. This led to them forming the Breakin’ Loose record label. The first single entitled "Hypnotic Love", which included four entirely different mixes of the song featuring DJ CJ Lewis, and spent seven weeks at no. 1 in the UK Reggae Charts in 1993. "Hypnotic Love" remained in the chart for six months. This was followed by the single "Today", which had the same format of four mixes and was also the title track of his second album. "Today" reached no. 5 in the UK Reggae Chart and showcased the different genres Leo had expanded into, side A featured songs in the Soul/R & B genre while side B stayed within the reggae/lovers rock genres which Leo was known for.

After a string of releases, Leo was approached by EMI Records. He then signed as a recording artist. This led to two top 75 UK Singles Chart positions with "Second Chance" (no. 57) and "Thinking About Your Love" (no. 64) which featured the DJ Top Cat on the street versions. Whilst he was with EMI Records, Leo produced CJ Lewis’ album, Dollars, recorded for MCA Records, from which he had a no. 3 with "Sweets for My Sweet", and another two consecutive releases which reached the UK top twenty in the UK Singles Chart. The album went on to sell over 500,000 copies worldwide. Lewis's second album, Rough & Smooth, again produced by Leo, went platinum in Japan, and had a no.1 single taken from it called "R to the A" in France and sold over 1,000,000 copies worldwide. Leo then got his own record company Sharma Productions back on the road. His next release his third album entitled Just 4 U. The first single from the album, "Angel Heart"/"I Wanna be the One", sparked a lot of interest especially in Japan. This led to being asked to appear alongside other British and Jamaican reggae acts on Japansplash, a yearly event which takes place in different towns across Japan over the course of six weeks.

In 1997, a limited release of Phillip Leo's fifth album Down 2 Earth was circulated, from which the top ten reggae single "Summer Girl" featuring Glamma Kid was taken. Leo also embarked on more music production and remixing for other artists including Louchie Lou & Michie One, Carroll Thompson, Jack Radics, Japanese DJ Nahki, Judy Cheeks, Sean Mcguire, Musical Youth, Charlene Smith, Awesome, and Rick Clarke.

In May 2017, Leo's seventh album, Faithfully was released; the first single off the album was "Feel So Good" and the second was "Your Life". Space Dub 2 is a follow-up to Space Dub originally released in 1996. Just 4 U, Down 2 Earth and Space Dub have been reissued and remastered for digital download.

== Discography ==
=== Albums ===
Year	Album	Record label
1989	Lover of Music	Finestyle
1991	Today	Breakin' Loose
1996	Just 4 U	Sharma Productions
1996	Space Dub	Sharma Productions
1997	Love vs. Pain (Germany)	G.I.B. Music
1997	Down 2 Earth	Sharma Productions
2017	Faithfully	Big Lion Productions
2017	Space Dub 2	Big Lion Productions
2017	Just 4 U (digitally remastered)	Big Lion Productions
2017	Down 2 Earth (digitally remastered)	Big Lion Productions
2017	Space Dub (digitally remastered)	Big Lion Productions
2018	The Universe	Big Lion Productions
2018	Space Dub 3	Big Lion Productions
2019	New Horizon	Big Lion Productions
2020	Rolling River	Big Lion Productions
2021	The Best of Phillip Leo	Big Lion Productions

=== Singles and EPs ===
Year	Single	Record label
1989	"Rocking the Night Away" / "Food of Love"	Finestyle
1989	"I Wanna Be Loved By You"	Finestyle
1989	"Why Do Fools Fall in Love" (with C.J. Lewis)	Fashion Records
1989	"Good Thing Going" / "Stop Fooling Around" (with C.J. Lewis)	Fashion Records
1989	"I'm Missing You" / "Come On and Dance"	Finestyle
1989	"Run You Could a Run"	Fashion Records
1990	"One Night" / "We Belong Together" (with Marie Dawn)	Finestyle
1990	"One Life to Live"	Gussie P Records
1991	"Girl of My Dreams" / "One Life to Live"	Finestyle
1990	"Young Gifted & Black" (with C.J. Lewis)	Fashion Records
1991	"Mission Impossible" (with C.J. Lewis and Nerious Joseph)	Fashion Records
1991	"Hypnotic Love" (4 mixes)	Breakin' Loose
1992	"Today" (4 mixes)	Breakin' Loose
1992	"All Our Fathers Children" (featuring General Levy)	Fashion Records
1992	"Let Your Love Run Wild" (featuring C.J. Lewis)	Breakin' Loose
1993	"The Vibe Is Right" / "Remote Control"	Sharma Productions
1993	"So Alive" (with C.J. Lewis)	Sharma Productions
1994	"Second Chance"	EMI Records
1995	"Thinking About Your Love" (mixes featuring Top Cat)	EMI Records
1996	"Angel Heart" / "I Wanna Be the One"	Sharma Productions
1996	"Let Me Hold You" / "I Thank You"	Sharma Productions
1996	"No Temporary Love"	Pacific Sound Records
1997	"Summer Girl" (featuring Glamma Kid)	Sharma Productions
1998	"Sexafect"	Sharma Productions
2017	Your Life (EP)	Big Lion Productions
2023	Happy New Year (Auld Lang Syne) with Paul Phillips	Big Lion Productions
2023	2 Sides of the Story (EP)	Big Lion Productions

=== Remix releases ===
Year	Release	Record label
2017	Feel So Good (Remixes)	Big Lion Productions
2017	On My Own (The Remixes)	Big Lion Productions
2017	The Creators Children (The Remixes)	Big Lion Productions
2017	I Believe in Your Love (The Remixes)	Big Lion Productions
2017	Mellow Soul Moods (The Soul Remixes)	Big Lion Productions
2017	Dancehall Moods (The Dancehall Remixes)	Big Lion Productions
2017	Dance Moods (The Dance Remixes)	Big Lion Productions
2018	The Gift (Remixes)	Big Lion Productions
2018	Hold On (Remixes)	Big Lion Productions
2018	Love Your Life (Remixes)	Big Lion Productions
2018	Don't Judge Me (Remixes)	Big Lion Productions
2018	Escape (Remixes)	Big Lion Productions
2018	A Heart That's Pure (Remixes)	Big Lion Productions
2018	Dancehall Moods Volume 2 (The Dancehall Remixes)	Big Lion Productions
2018	Dance Moods Volume 2 (The Dance Remixes)	Big Lion Productions
2018	Mellow Soul Moods Volume 2 (The Soul Remixes)	Big Lion Productions
2019	Together We'll Abide (Remixes)	Big Lion Productions
2019	Times Will Change (Remixes)	Big Lion Productions
2019	The Border (Remixes)	Big Lion Productions
2019	The Future (Remixes)	Big Lion Productions
2019	Peaceful Party (Remixes)	Big Lion Productions
2019	Violation (Remixes)	Big Lion Productions
2020	Let Love Be Your Guide (Remixes)	Big Lion Productions
2020	Love Grows (Remixes)	Big Lion Productions
2020	Never Lose That Feeling (Remixes)	Big Lion Productions
2020	The Sun Will Shine (Remixes)	Big Lion Productions
2020	Heavens Beauty (Remixes)	Big Lion Productions
2020	A Losing Game (Remixes)	Big Lion Productions
2020	Dancehall Moods Volume 3 (The Dancehall Remixes)	Big Lion Productions
2020	Dance Moods Volume 3 (The Dance Remixes)	Big Lion Productions
2020	Mellow Soul Moods Volume 3 (The Soul Remixes)	Big Lion Productions
