= UK Blak =

Studio album by Caron Wheeler
- Released: 21 Oct 1990
- Studios: The Church Studios (London), Grove Studio (Ocho Rios, Jamaica), Calliope Productions (NYC), The Apollo Center (NYC), Red Buss Recording Studios, Livingstone Studio, Unit 3 studios
- Genres: Soul; R&B; new jack swing; electronica
- Label: EMI
- Producers: Afrika Baby Bam; Blacksmith; Mark Brydon; Jimmy "Senya" Haynes; Derek Johnson; Carl MacKintosh; Ray Simpson; Steely & Clevie; The Twilight Firm

Caron Wheeler studio album chronology
UK Blak (1990)	Beach of the War Goddess (1993)

Singles from UK Blak
- 1. "Livin' in the Light" Released: 27 August 1990; 2. "UK Blak" Released: 13 September 1990; 3. "Blue (Is the Colour of Pain)" Released: 21 January 1991; 4. "Don't Quit" Released: 5 May 1991

Professional ratings
Review scores
Source	Rating
AllMusic	4/5 stars
Robert Christgau	(dud)
Entertainment Weekly	A−
Los Angeles Times	2.5/4 stars

UK Blak is the debut studio album by British singer Caron Wheeler. It was released on 21 October 1990 by EMI Records. Recording sessions for the album took place from January 1990 to March 1990 at several studios, during the hiatus of her group Soul II Soul. As executive producer of the album, Wheeler took a wider role in its production, co-writing a majority of the songs, choosing which ones to produce and sharing ideas on the mixing and mastering of tracks. The album includes the single "Livin' in the Light", which reached the UK Top 20, plus three further singles, "UK Blak", "Blue (Is the Colour of Pain)" and "Don't Quit".

== Background ==
In 1990, Wheeler left Soul II Soul to pursue a solo career, and shortly after leaving the group she secured a contract with RCA/EMI Records. The album charted well in the UK Albums Chart with the help of the first single "Livin' in the Light".

In the album liner notes, it is said that "This album was made with loving thoughts of Martin Shure, and inspired by Skakti Gawain and Marvin Gaye."

== Track listing ==
UK Blak track listing
No.	Title	Writer(s)	Producer(s)	Length
1.	"UK Blak"	Caron Wheeler / Carl McIntosh	Carl McIntosh	4:22
2.	"Livin' in the Light (The Remix)"	Caron Wheeler / N. P. Hail	Blacksmith	4:35
3.	"Blue (Is the Colour of Pain)"	Caron Wheeler / Mark Brydon / A. Dust	Mark Brydon	4:56
4.	"No Regrets"	Caron Wheeler / Tim Atkins / Peter Trotman / Karl Atkins	Blacksmith	3:51
5.	"This Is Mine (featuring MC Mell"O")"	Caron Wheeler / Tim Atkins / Peter Trotman / Karl Atkins / M. Henry	Blacksmith	4:01
6.	"Don't Quit"	Jimmy Haynes	Jimmy "Senya" Haynes	4:22
7.	"Enchanted (featuring Raymond Simpson)"	Caron Wheeler / Raymond Simpson	Raymond Simpson	4:26
8.	"Never Lonely"	Caron Wheeler / Raymond Simpson / B.A. Bramble / S.D. Gaim	The Twilight Firm	4:10
9.	"Song for You"	Jimmy Haynes	Jimmy "Senya" Haynes	4:11
10.	"Somewhere"	Caron Wheeler / Derek Johnson	Derek Johnson	4:13
11.	"Proud"	Caron Wheeler / R. Guthrie / Wycliffe Johnson / Cleveland Browne	Wycliffe Johnson / Cleveland Browne	4:48
12.	"Kama Yo"	Caron Wheeler / B.A. Bramble / S.D. Gaim	The Twilight Firm	5:06
13.	"Jamaica"	Caron Wheeler / Wycliffe Johnson / Cleveland Browne	Wycliffe Johnson / Cleveland Browne	3:58
14.	"Livin' in the Light (The Original Story)"	Caron Wheeler / N. P. Hail	Afrika Baby Bam (The Jungle Brothers)	5:45
Total length:				62:40

== Personnel ==
- Caron Wheeler – lead vocals (All tracks), backing vocals (tracks 1–14), producer (tracks 1, 4–7), executive producer, vocal producer (1, 4–7), songwriter (1–14)
- Aniija – mbira
- Karl Atkins – keyboards (track 2), songwriter (track 4, 5)
- Tim Atkins – drum programming (track 2, 4, 5), songwriter (track 4, 5)
- Afrika Baby Bam – producer (track 2, 14), programming (14), songwriter (track 2, 14)
- Trevor Bedford – additional recording engineer (track 1)
- Rick Bell – saxophone (track 14)
- Blacksmith – producer (track 2, 4, 5)
- Bolaii Adeola Badeio – backing vocals (tracks 12)
- Boy George – songwriter (track 3)
- Brian Bramble – bass, drum programming, synthesizer programming (track 8, 12)
- Clevie Browne – drums and producer (track 11, 13), songwriter (track 13)
- Danny Browne – guitar (track 11, 13)
- Mark Brydon – producer and songwriter (track 3)
- Ray Carless – saxophone (track 8)
- Clinton Clarke – trombone (track 8)
- Colin – assistant recording engineer (track 2, 5)
- Victor Cross – keyboards (track 3)
- DJ Devastate – additional programming (track 8, 12)
- Pandit Dinesh – percussion (track 6, 8, 12)
- Adam Fuest – recording engineer (track 2, 4, 5, 8, 10–13)
- Roger Guthrie – saxophone (track 11)
- Lee Hamblin – recording engineer (track 6, 7)
- Jimmy "Senya" Haynes – producer and songwriter (track 9)
- Mickey Isley – assistant engineer (track 14)
- Derek Johnson – guitar (track 1, 5, 10)
- Wycliffe Johnson – keyboards, producer, songwriter (track 11, 13)
- Ben Jones – tape op (track 3)
- Mr. Lawnee – scratches (track 14)
- Gregg Mann – mixing (track 14)
- Carl McIntosh – producer and songwriter (track 1)
- MC Mell'O' – rap and songwriter (track 5)
- Dick "TCB" Meaney – assistant recording engineer (track 4, 6–13)
- Gordon Milne – recording engineer (track 1)
- Clifton "Bigga" Morrison – keyboards (track 1)
- Uncle Mike Jones – bass (track 14)
- Robert Power – recording engineer (track 14)
- Errol Reid – keyboards (track 7)
- Arabella Rodriguez – mixing (track 1, 3, 6, 7, 9)
- Dr. Shane Faber – keyboards and recording engineer (track 14)
- Ray Simpson – lead vocals, backing vocals, keyboards, drum programming (track 7)
- Simon Stirling – strings arrangement (track 6)
- Stephen Steward – recording engineer (track 11, 13)
- Stevie G – bass, drum programming, synthesizer programming (track 8, 12)
- Robert Sithole – flute (track 12)
- Towa Tei – producer (track 14)
- Henry "Buttons" Tenyue – brass (track 1)
- Patrick Tenyue – brass (track 1)
- Peter Trotman – bass (track 2, 4), songwriter (track 4, 5), vocal arrangement (track 5)
- The Twilight Firm – producer (track 1, 8, 12)
- Carl Ward – producer (track 7)
- Sheila Watts – harp (track 7)

== Charts and certifications ==
=== Weekly charts ===
Chart (1990/91)	Peak position
Australian Albums (ARIA Charts)	128
Dutch Albums Chart	75
Swedish Albums Chart	43
UK Albums Chart	14
U.S. Billboard 200	133
U.S. Top R&B/Hip-Hop Albums	30

=== Certifications ===
Region	Certification	Certified units/sales
United Kingdom (BPI)	Silver	60,000^{^}
^{^} Shipments figures based on certification alone.
