= Winsome Douglas =

British embroiderer and teacher

Winsome Douglas (or Douglass)
- Born: 1919; Hartlepool, England
- Died: 28 December 2016 (aged 96–97)
- Known for: teaching, embroidery, writing

Winsome Douglas (1919-2016) was a British embroiderer and teacher active in the United Kingdom in the 1950s and 1960s. She was born in Hartlepool in County Durham in 1919, and died at the age of 97 on 28 December 2016 in Hartlepool.

== Early life and education ==
An only child, Douglas' early life was spent primarily in the northeast of England. She attended the West Hartlepool High School for Girls. After leaving school, she gained a place at the St Hild's Women's Teacher Training College (now part of the University of Durham) where she graduated with a degree in geography.

== Teaching career ==
Much of Douglas' working life was dedicated to teaching in secondary schools in the Hartlepool area. Initially during the Second World War she taught pupils at the Dyke House School. Prior to retirement she taught at the Henry Smith Grammar School where she eventually became the deputy head of the school. This school closed in 1977 and was demolished in 1982.

== Artistic contributions ==
While teaching at Dyke House School, Douglas helped to set up the National Needlework Development Scheme (NDS). This initiative, a joint venture between the textiles industry and art colleges, sponsored by J & P Coats the Scottish thread manufacturer, lasted from 1934 to 1961. It aimed to raise standards of embroidery design and practice through reaching out to girls and women in schools, training colleges and the Women's Institute. On behalf of the NDS Douglas helped to acquire examples of high quality needlework and embroidery from around the world, to be used as demonstration pieces and teaching tools for adults and children. Douglas herself designed and created embroidery for the NDS. Her work includes vibrant and intricately embroidered panels, cushions and soft toys, which showcase her embroidery skills. Douglas frequently deployed bright, contrasting colours such as red, black and white, to depict stylised or unusual beasts, birds and fish in her designs.

When the NDS was disbanded in 1961, its vast collection of needlework of over 3,500 items was distributed among The National Museum of Scotland, The Victoria and Albert Museum in London and the 4 major Scottish art colleges - Edinburgh, Glasgow, Dundee and Aberdeen. Several examples of Douglas' creative output are now to be found in the collections of British public museums, art galleries, art colleges, and universities, including the Victoria and Albert Museum, Reading Museum and the Paisley Museum.

In December 2019, The University of Edinburgh College of Art held a special 2 month-long exhibition, entitled 'Touching Stitches', to show off items from its historic NDS collection of embroidery. The event was described as a display of inspiring pieces of needlework and textile art from the 17th to the 20th century. The exhibition showcases several of Douglas' intricate designs and finished pieces. One of these is a brightly coloured circular cushion; a description and photograph of it can be viewed on the University of Edinburgh website. This piece features bold, fantastical animals, embroidered in primary colours. A stitch analysis carried out in 2017 by the Edinburgh College of Art (ECA) showed that it contained 17 different types of embroidery stitches.

In addition to revealing rarely-displayed work, the exhibition highlights how Douglas' samples were used by ECA as a valuable teaching tool for groups of women, including refugees, prisoners and visually impaired.

== Writing career ==
Douglas wrote three books on embroidery techniques during her long life. The books, entitled 'Discovering Embroidery', 'Let me Embroider' and 'Embroidery' were published by Mills and Boon in the 1950s. A more specialised book entitled 'Toys for your Delight' was published in the 1960s.

These books were designed to inspire and educate others in the craft, by explaining and illustrating techniques of embroidery to the public. The books passed on the knowledge and skills gained through her own artistic endeavours and her experience in the Needlework Development Scheme to future generations of sewers and embroiderers.
