= Keep On Movin' (Soul II Soul song) =

1989 single by Soul II Soul

Single by Soul II Soul featuring Caron Wheeler

from the album Club Classics Vol. One
- Released: 6 March 1989
- Recorded: 1988
- Studio: Britannia Row (London)
- Genre: R&B; soul
- Length: 6:02 (album version); 3:38 (7-inch edit)
- Label: Virgin
- Songwriter: Jazzie B
- Producers: Jazzie B; Nellee Hooper

Soul II Soul singles chronology
"Feel Free" (1988)	"Keep On Movin'" (1989)	"Back to Life (However Do You Want Me)" (1989)

Music video
- "Keep On Movin" on YouTube

"Keep On Movin'" is a song by British soul and R&B band Soul II Soul. It was released as the second single from their debut album, Club Classics Vol. One (1989) (Keep On Movin' in the United States), in March 1989 by Virgin Records. It is one of two songs on the album that features British R&B singer Caron Wheeler (the other being "Back to Life (However Do You Want Me)"). "Keep On Movin'" is written by Jazzie B and produced by him with Nellee Hooper. It reached number five on the UK Singles Chart, number 11 on the US Billboard Hot 100, and topped three other Billboard charts. In October 1996, the song re-entered the UK Singles Chart at number 31, minus the sleeve credit to Wheeler, after its use in an episode of the highly popular series of Papa and Nicole commercials for the Renault Clio car on British television. Two different music videos were produced to accompany the song.

== Production ==
Produced by Nellee Hooper and Jazzie B, the song was originally to only feature Caron Wheeler as a guest vocalist on the song. After recording the song in 1988, Wheeler was added to the lineup of Soul II Soul. The song became the titled-track for the group's American release Keep on Movin'.

== Critical reception ==
Donald Ades from El Paisano complimented the song as "a refreshing rehash of the 70's soul/dance music explosion that promised for something more refreshing". Robert Hilburn from Los Angeles Times wrote that it's "an especially well-designed blend of optimistic lyric and understated, almost melancholy vocal (by Caron Wheeler) and instrumental arrangement." Another editor, Duff Marlowe, called it a "breezy, romantic composition". Forrest Green III from The Michigan Daily named "Keep On Movin'" "the single of the year by way of its power, range, and scope." He felt the beat is reminiscent of Eric B.'s "Paid in Full", "which is quickly becoming the blueprint for much of pop music", and also noted the song's "jazzy, semi-sweet piano groove and topped with violin undercurrents from the Reggae Philharmonic Orchestra — you've got something really delicious here. Featured singer Caron Wheeler's voice sounds like positivity in motion."

Pan-European magazine Music & Media described the song as "slow and sensuous R&B with more than a hint of the 70s. Good string arrangement in a Rose Royce vein. Big in the UK." Jerry Smith from Music Week said, "A lush, infectiously loping sound, it must be a massive hit." Another editor, Alan Jones, praised its "serene majesty". Malu Halasa, reviewer of British music newspaper Record Mirror, also found Wheeler's work as "extremely pleasant". William Shaw from Smash Hits wrote, "A fine example of one of those slow, slithery disco smoochers where not much happens really: violins twiddle a bit, a piano tinkles lazily, a woman sings here and there, and yet, somehow, the whole lot slips together effortlessly to make a supremely luxurious noise. Undoubtedly, this will become a bit of a popular favourite on the dancefloors."

== Retrospective response ==
In a 2019 retrospective review, Justin Chadwick from Albumism remarked Caron Wheeler's "soaring vocals atop a stirring confection of deep bass and piano flourishes". He found that the song's "offering a more broadly applicable clarion call to those in need of a little motivation in their lives." AllMusic editor Alex Henderson described "Keep On Movin'" as a "Chic-influenced gem". In 2009, Daryl Easlea for BBC constated that the song, "with its upbeat message and Norman Whitfield-inspired strings, made a star of vocalist Caron Wheeler." He remarked that "her authoritative, classic R&B voice sounding electrifyingly soulful." In another 2009 review, the Daily Vault's Michael R. Smith wrote that it "has an elegant, sweeping style that is set to a danceable beat."

"Keep on Movin'" is mentioned in the first chapter of Paul Gilroy's book The Black Atlantic: Modernity and Double Consciousness (1993). Gilroy uses this particular song because he considers the song emblematic of a black transatlantic conversation. The song is notable for its expansion across nation-states, being produced in England by a group of people with Caribbean ancestry but having also been remixed into a Jamaican dub format in the United States. Gilroy describes the song as an expression of "the restlessness of spirit which makes the diaspora culture vital." "Keep On Movin" made reference to racialized issues experienced by groups within the Diaspora. The song is sung by Caron Wheeler; and it was remixed into a dub format in the United States by Teddy Riley.

== Music videos ==
Two music videos exist for "Keep on Movin'", the first being the official video one and the second being an alternate video. The first music video premiered on various music video shows. The other music video was released online.

Official video

This video features Caron Wheeler in front of a piano before a pink backdrop in wearing a white dress-suit, performing the song. Cutscenes featuring the other members of Soul II Soul including Aitch B and Jazzie B were used in the video. Another scene with Wheeler and Jazzie B in black outfits also used. The video also features the use of a group dancing to choreography of the song. It was published on YouTube in June 2009. The video has amassed more than 12.4 million views as of September 2021.

Alternate video

The music video features Caron Wheeler wearing a red tribal jacket and head scarf with black top, performing the song against a black background. Jazzie B also appears wearing a green and yellow jacket. Singer and dancer Wunmi appears as one of the dancers in the video, wearing a red tribal jacket. Interspersed are some of the lyrics from the song. Later in the video, the group appears together dancing to the music with three violinists in the background.

== Live performances ==
Soul II Soul performed "Keep on Movin'" on various televised appearances, including the Top of the Pops, Soul Train, and Big World Cafe. Their performance from Top of the Pops aired on 16 March 1989. At the end of 1989, Wheeler later departed from the group. Their performance on Soul Train featured the debut performance of then-new member Marcia Lewis; who performed the lead vocals.

The song was included in the group's set list for their A New Decade Tour in 1990 and was performed early in the set on tour dates. Victoria Wilson-James, a recent addition to group, performed the lead vocals to the song during the tour. Wheeler also included the song during her solo tours. A live recording of the song was released on Wheeler's live CD/DVD Live at Duo Music Exchange, which featured her performing live in Tokyo, Japan. In 2007, Wheeler reunited with the group and performed the song at the Lovebox Festival. In December 2012, Soul II Soul (composed of Jazzie B and Caron Wheeler) performed the song on Later... with Jools Holland.

In December 2016, Soul II Soul released their live album Origins: The Roots of Soul II Soul which included a live recorded version on the song, sung by Wheeler.

== Impact and legacy ==
Paul Oakenfold named "Keep On Movin'" one of his favourites in Melody Maker in October 1994, saying, "This is a classic tune which affected me in the same way Massive Attack did. The first time I heard Club Classics Vol 1 I just played it non-stop. I couldn't take it out of my car cassette deck. It was so interesting then because the vast majority of club music was all uptempo and this just totally cut through everything."

Q Magazine ranked "Keep On Movin'" at number 277 in their list of the "1001 Best Songs Ever" in 2003.

Mixmag listed the song number 87 in its "100 Greatest Dance Singles Of All Time" list in 1996, adding, "'Keep On Movin'' was clearly a classic as soon as it came out in the early summer of 1989. The old soul vibe was glued on to the electronic swing and suddenly if you were British you could still be funky."

In BBC Radio’s 2008 listeners & DJs poll "The Greatest Ever Dance Record", "Keep On Movin'" came in at #6 after Michael Jackson's "Billie Jean", James Brown's "Sex Machine", Donna Summer's "I Feel Love", Derrick May's "Strings of Life" and Alison Limerick's "Where Love Lives".

The Daily Telegraph ranked "Keep On Movin'" #33 in their "Top 50 Dance Songs" list in 2015.

== Track listing ==
A-side

1. "Keep On Movin'" (Club Mix ft. Caron Wheeler) — 5:46
2. "Keep On Movin'" (Big Beat A Capella) — 3:32
3. "Keep On Movin'" (Nellee Hooper 7-inch) — 3:38

B-side

1. "Keep On Movin'" (Teddy Riley's Rubba Dub) — 5:59
2. "Keep On Movin'" (The First Movement) — 6:03
3. "Keep On Movin'" (Teddy Riley's Bonus Beats) — 5:54

== Charts ==
=== Weekly charts ===
1989 weekly chart performance for "Keep On Movin'"
Chart (1989)	Peak position
Australia (ARIA)	77
Austria (Ö3 Austria Top 40)	18
Belgium (Ultratop 50 Flanders)	22
Canada Top Singles (RPM)	15
Canada Dance/Urban (RPM)	1
Europe (Eurochart Hot 100)	16
France (SNEP)	46
Ireland (IRMA)	10
Italy Airplay (Music & Media)	8
Luxembourg (Radio Luxembourg)	4
Netherlands (Dutch Top 40)	6
Netherlands (Single Top 100)	9
New Zealand (Recorded Music NZ)	14
Switzerland (Schweizer Hitparade)	18
UK Singles (Official Charts)	5
US Billboard Hot 100	11
US 12-inch Singles Sales (Billboard)	1
US Dance Club Play (Billboard)	1
US Hot Black Singles (Billboard)	1
West Germany (GfK)	13

1996 weekly chart performance for "Keep On Movin'"
Chart (1996)	Peak position
Europe (Eurochart Hot 100)	74
Scotland (OCC)	41
UK Singles (Official Charts)	31
UK Dance (OCC)	6
UK R&B (OCC)	7

=== Year-end charts ===
Year-end chart performance for "Keep On Movin'"
Chart (1989)	Position
Netherlands (Dutch Top 40)	70
Netherlands (Single Top 100)	81
UK Singles (OCC)	64
US Billboard Hot 100	100
US 12-inch Singles Sales (Billboard)	1
US Dance Club Play (Billboard)	9
US Hot Black Singles (Billboard)	2
West Germany (Media Control)	48

== Certifications ==
Certifications and sales for "Keep On Movin'"
Region	Certification	Certified units/sales
United Kingdom (BPI)	Silver	200,000^{‡}
^{‡} Sales+streaming figures based on certification alone.
