= Peter Hunnigale =

British musician

- Also known as: Mr. Honey Vibes
- Born: 12 December 1960 (age 65); South London, England
- Genres: Lovers rock, roots reggae, dubplate
- Occupation: Singer-songwriter
- Instruments: Vocals, bass guitar
- Years active: 1982–present

Peter Hunnigale, also known as Mr. Honey Vibes (born 12 December 1960, South London, England) is a British reggae singer best known for his lovers rock and conscious roots reggae releases and discomixes.

== Biography ==
Hunnigale started his career as bass guitarist with the Vibes Corner Collective. In 1983, LGR Records issued his debut release as a singer, "Slipping Away", which was followed by "Got To Know You" on the Street Vibes label, a label that Hunnigale set up with Night Flight Band sound engineer and drummer, Fitzroy Blake, who had also been a member of the Street Vibes Collective and had produced Levi Roots, Maxi Priest, Trevor Hartley as well as working for Jet Star (record distribution company).

He topped the UK reggae chart in 1987 with "Be My Lady", which was followed by his debut album, In This Time. A string of hits followed, and he enjoyed another UK reggae number one with "Ragamuffin Girl", a combination Discomix single recorded with Tippa Irie. The single was also voted Best British Reggae Record by Echoes newspaper at the end of the year. He won a Best Newcomer award at the Celebrity Awards in 1987, and won Best British Reggae Album at the British Reggae Industry Awards the same year. The success of the single led to further combination work with Irie, including two albums – The New Decade on Island Records and Done Cook and Currie for Rebel MC's Junglist Drum and Bass Tribal Base label. The latter was produced by Hunnigale and he also played all the instruments on it.

He also recorded in Jamaica, with dubplate and roots reggae producer Gussie Clarke. Hunnigale's second solo album, Mr. Vibes, followed in 1992. In 1993, he again linked up with Tippa irie for the "Shouting For The Gunners" single, a celebration of the football club that they both supported, Arsenal FC.

1994 saw Hunnigale moving in a radically conscious, spiritually mystic, politically charged Roots reggae Rockers direction with Mr. Government and War on Babylon vocal and dub excursions, recorded with Neil "Mad Professor" Fraser. Mad Professor produced further dubs to Hunnigale's tunes, releasing them on his Black Liberation dub album series, some of which were played on Dubplate at Jah Shaka dances, securing a following amongst the serious roots reggae sound system fraternity. Hunnigale again linked with Irie in 1995 for a version of The Abyssinians' "Declaration of Rights" recorded for his Nah Give Up compilation. Nah Give Up won the Best Reggae Album MOBO Award in 1996, one of several awards Hunnigale won during the mid-1990s. He also recorded duets with Dennis Brown ("Cupid"), Lloyd Brown ("Lonely Girl"), and Janet Lee Davis ("We Can Work It Out"). In 1996, Hunnigale performed at Jamaica's Reggae Sunsplash festival. Towards the end of 1996, Hunnigale performed as part of Passion, along with Glamma Kid and Nerious Joseph, spending eight weeks at number one in the UK reggae chart with "No Diggity".

Hunnigale also performed in the reggae musical, Johnny Dollar.

== Discography ==
=== Albums ===
- In This Time (1987) Level Vibes (Peter Hunnigale & The Night Flight Band)
- The New Decade (1991) Mango (with Tippa Irie)
- Mr. Vibes (1992) Street Vibes
- Done Cook and Currie (1992) Tribal Base
- The Pacifists Sony
- Mr. Government (1994) Ariwa
- Silly Habits (1997) Down to Jam
- Genuine Saxon
- Back to the Old Skool vol. 1 (1998) Discotex
- Can't Stop (2002) Charm
- African Tears (2001) Charm
- Toe 2 Toe Vol VIII Jet Star
- Rhythm & Song (2006) Cousins
- Free Soul (2008) Peckings
- Pizza and Alcohol (2019), Jet Star

=== Compilations ===
- Nah Give Up (1995) Kalymazoo/Down to Jam
- Reggae Max (1996) Jet Star
- Reggae Max Part 2 (2006) Jet Star
