= T.T. Ross =

- Also known as: Silkie Davis; Liz Davis; Joan Ross; T.T. Rose; Maxine
- Born: Elizabeth Mayanna Terresa Zachariasz
- Origin: London, England
- Genres: Lovers rock
- Years active: 1969–1982
- Labels: Dip, Lucky, Polydor, Lover's Rock

T.T. Ross was a British lovers rock singer best known for her 1970s singles "Last Date" and "Imagine".

Ross began to record in 1970, initially as "Silkie Davis" or "Maxine", or as both halves of "Ruby & Gloria" (double-tracking her voice), amongst other pseudonyms. She first used the names "T.T.", then "T.T. Rose", and finally "T.T. Ross" on singles recorded as duets with Gene Rondo. All her work was in various styles of reggae.

Ross first found success on the British reggae charts in 1975 with "Last Date", produced by Dennis Harris and released on the Lucky label, one of the early releases in the lovers rock genre. The single was later licensed to Polydor Records. She had further success with a cover version of John Lennon's "Imagine" in 1978. One of few white singers in the genre at the time, she was known as 'The White Lady of Reggae'. She continued to record into the early 1980s.

== Discography ==
=== Albums ===
- T.T. Ross and Friends (1976), Third World
- Showcase Vol. 1, Lover's Rock (LR005)
- Mellow Mood (1980), Three Kings

=== Compilations ===
- Say You Wanna Be Loved (1997), Creole/Rhino

=== Singles ===
- "When Will I See You Again" (1974/5), Dip
- "Little Things Mean a Lot" (1975), Dip - Gene Rondo & T.T. Ross
- "Miss Grace" (1975), Wild Flower - Gene Rondo & T.T. Ross
- "Last Date" (1975), Lucky - also issued on Polydor Records
- "I am Sorry" (1975), Polydor
- "No Charge" (1975), Lucky
- "Single Girl" (1975), Dip
- "Baby Why" (1976), Lucky
- "Misty Blue" (1976), Lucky
- "Let the World Go Away" (1976), House of Eve
- "Taxation" (1976), Junior
- "Jealousy" (1977), Lucky
- "I Will" (1977), Lover's Rock
- "Imagine" (1978), Lover's Rock
- "No Charge" (1978), Lover's Rock (12")
- "Won't Mention It Again" (1978), Love Bird
- "Tonight Is the Night" (1978), Love Bird - Cassandra & T.T. Ross
- "He's Mine", Dione
- "Romeo" (1982), Love, Peace & Unity
- "When I Was a Little Girl" (2012), Attack
