= Beach of the War Goddess =

Studio album by Caron Wheeler
- Released: February 23, 1993
- Genre: R&B; soul; funk; pop
- Length: 60:48
- Label: EMI
- Producer: Heavy Love; Jimmy Jam and Terry Lewis; Mikie Bennett; The Twilight Firm; Get Set V.O.P.; Derek Johnson

Caron Wheeler chronology
UK Blak (1990)	Beach of the War Goddess (1993)	Live at Duo Music Exchange (2006)

Singles from Beach of the War Goddess
- 1. "I Adore You" Released: 13 October 1992; 2. "In Our Love" Released: 23 January 1993; 3. "Soul Street" Released: 10 August 1993; 4. "Beach of the War Goddess" Released: 13 September 1993

Professional ratings
Review scores
Source	Rating
AllMusic	4.5/5 stars
Calgary Herald	B+
Los Angeles Times	2.5/4 stars
Philadelphia Inquirer	3/4 stars

Beach of the War Goddess is the second studio album by British recording artist Caron Wheeler. The album was released on 23 February 1993 by EMI Records.

== Release and promotion ==
In collaboration with RCA Records, Beach of the War Goddess was released outside of Europe through EMI Records on 23 February 1993. The album spent five weeks on the Top R&B/Hip-Hop Albums' chart and peaked at number 81.

=== Singles ===
The album's lead single "I Adore You" was originally featured on the soundtrack to the film Mo' Money. "I Adore You" charted number 59 on the UK Singles chart and peaked at number 12 on Billboard's Hot R&B/Hip-Hop Songs' chart. "In Our Love" was released as the second single, peaking at number 61 on Billboard's Hot R&B Songs chart.

In August 1993, the album's third single "Soul Street" was released, but failed to chart. In September 1993, the fourth single "Beach of the War Goddess" was released and peaked at number 75 on the UK Singles chart.

== Track listing ==
No.	Title	Writer(s)	Producer(s)	Length
1.	"Respect to the Motherland"	Caron Wheeler; David Moore; Gary Bramble	Wheeler	0:58
2.	"In Our Love" (featuring Sibyl X)	Wheeler; Philip Whyte; Simon Harris; Sibyl X	Wheeler; Heavy Love	4:44
3.	"I Adore You"	Wheeler; Jimmy Jam; Terry Lewis	Wheeler; Jam; Lewis	4:42
4.	"Wonder"	Jazzie B; Wheeler; Will Mowat	Jazzie B; Wheeler	4:13
5.	"Gotta Give It Up"	Wheeler; Anthony Henderson; Courtland White; Mikie Bennett; Leroy Romans; Michael Spence	Derek Johnson; Wheeler; Bennett	4:12
6.	"Beach of the War Goddess"	Wheeler; Moore; Brian Bramble; Gary Bramble; Mark Batson; Maxine Crosby; Stephen Gaim	The Twilight Firm; Wheeler	5:51
7.	"Soul Street"	Wheeler; Mark Batson; Scott Batson	Get Set V.O.P.; Wheeler	5:23
8.	"Lite as a Feather"	Wheeler; Mark Batson; S. Batson	Wheeler	5:03
9.	"Need a Man"	Wheeler; Simon Harris; Simon Law	Heavy Love; Jimi Randolph; Wheeler	5:15
10.	"Father"	Wheeler; Mark Batson; S. Batson	Get Set V.O.P.; Wheeler	5:54
11.	"Naughty Eyes"	Wheeler; Henderson; White; Bennett; Romans; Spence	Bennett; Wheeler	4:35
12.	"Wind Cries Mary"	Jimi Hendrix	Johnson	5:12
13.	"Do You Care"	Wheeler; Keith Crouch	Crouch; Wheeler	5:26
14.	"Land of Life"	Wheeler; Johnson	Johnson; Wheeler	7:19
Total length:				60:48

== Charts ==
Chart performance for Beach of the War Goddess
Chart (1993)	Peak position
Australian Albums (ARIA Charts)	125
US Top R&B/Hip-Hop Albums (Billboard)	81
