= Caron Wheeler =

British singer-songwriter (born 1963)

Caron Wheeler OBE
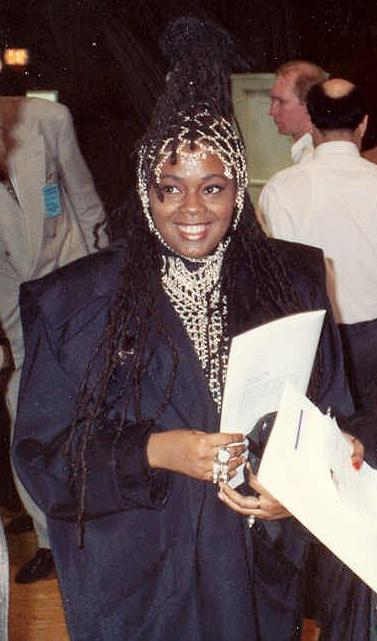
- Wheeler at the 1990 Grammy Awards
- Born: 19 January 1963 (age 63); Acton, London, England
- Occupations: Singer; songwriter; record producer; musician
- Years active: 1976–present
- Children: 1
- Musical career
- Genres: R&B; soul; pop; reggae
- Instruments: Vocals; piano
- Labels: Capitol; RCA; EMI

Caron Melina Wheeler OBE (born 19 January 1963) is a British singer, songwriter, record producer and musician. Born and raised in London, she performed in various singing competitions as a teenager and began her recording career as one of the founding members of Brown Sugar. She was also one of the founding members of the female backing vocalist group Afrodiziak. She officially rose to fame in the late 1980s as the lead singer of R&B group Soul II Soul. Managed by her bandmate, Jazzie B, the group became one of London's best-selling groups in the 1990s. Their debut album, Club Classics Vol. One (1989), which established them as a global success worldwide, earned two Grammy Awards and featured the UK and Billboard number-one singles "Keep On Movin'" and "Back to Life (However Do You Want Me)".

Following her exit from the group in 1990, she released her debut solo album, UK Blak (1990), which contained hits "Livin' in the Light", "UK Blak", and "Don't Quit". She continued her solo career with the release of her second album, Beach of the War Goddess (1993). Wheeler reunited with Soul II Soul in 1994, but left in 1995 due to creative differences. Throughout her career, she has performed on and off with Soul II Soul but officially rejoined them in 2013.

Described as a pioneer of the British soul scene, her musical repertoire is often characterized by themes of love, relationships, and empowerment, as well as black history. Her dynamic on-stage performances have led many critics to consider her one of the most effective singers in popular music. Throughout a career spanning 40 years, she has sold over 6 million records collectively as a solo artist and as a member of Soul II Soul. In June 2012, Wheeler was honoured with the Heritage Award from Performing Right Society along with the members of Soul II Soul.

== Career ==
=== 1976–1983: Brown Sugar ===
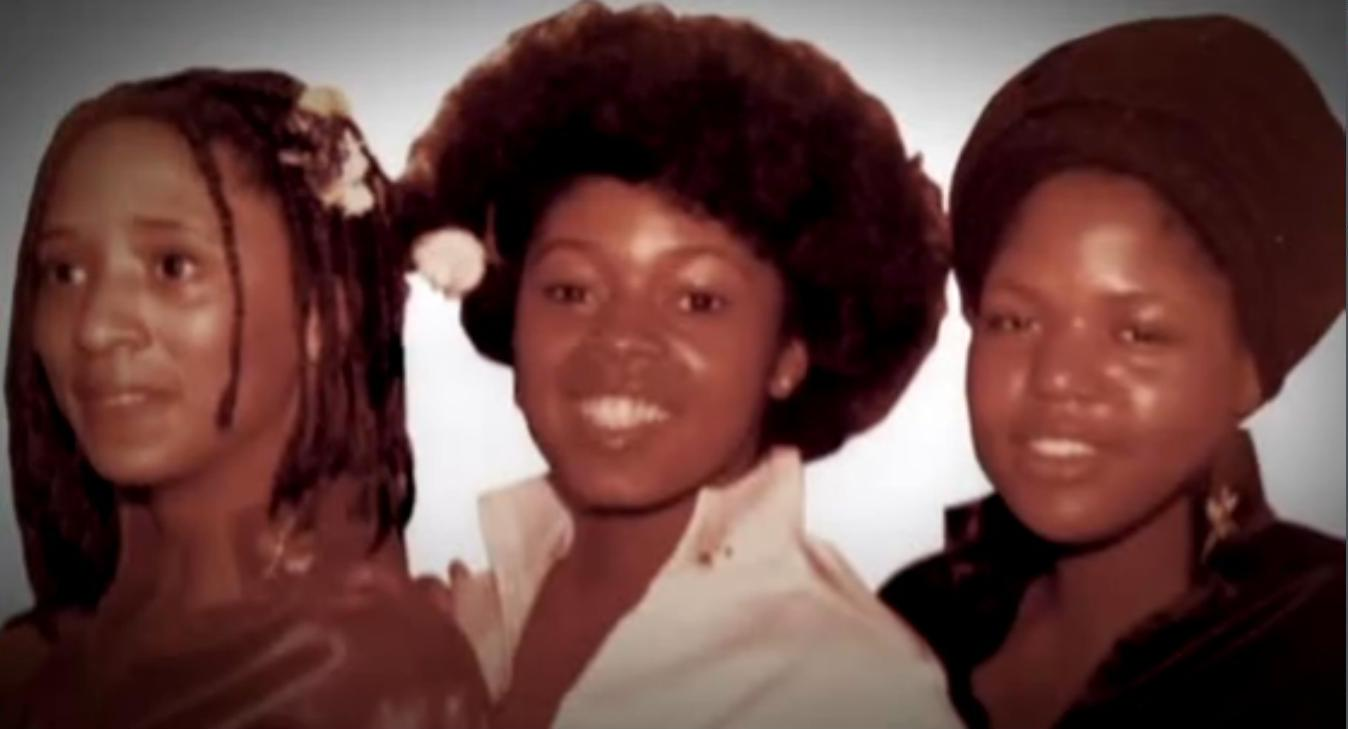
Carol Simms, Caron Wheeler, Pauline Catlin

Wheeler was born in England to Jamaican parents, and raised briefly in Jamaica. When Caron was in high school, she and childhood friend Pauline Catlin began performing together for fun. Inspired by female groups The Shirelles and The Ronettes whom they hoped to emulate, they began performing together professionally. In 1976, Wheeler and Catlin eventually entered and won a singing competition at the Bali Hai nightclub in London. Catlin and Wheeler later added Carol Simms and the women began performing as Brown Sugar.

In 1977, Brown Sugar released their major label debut song "I'm in Love with a Dreadlocks". The song was a massive hit with sound system owners and reggae lovers and went on to reach the top spot in the British reggae charts. Their self-titled album was scheduled to be released in 1977, but was shelved after the group disbanded due to the mistreatment by their recording label, Lover's Rock. In 1978, Caron reunited with Brown Sugar and embarked on a tour with Dennis Brown. Following the tour, the group released a series of singles: "Our Reggae Music", "Confession Hurts", "Dreaming of Zion", and "I am So Proud" in 1979. After releasing their final single "Go on Now" in 1983, the group disbanded to further pursue solo careers.

=== 1982–1988: Afrodiziak ===
In 1982, Wheeler met Claudia Fontaine, an English backing vocalist from Bethnal Green, London, England. They formed a duo known as Afrodiziak. The duo only performed as session vocalists for other singers, most notably for Elvis Costello on his album Punch the Clock in 1983. Afrodiziak later toured as backing vocalists for Elvis Costello during his UK tour in 1983. After the tour, they became a group by adding singer Naomi Thompson. The group would go on to contribute background vocals for many artists including Heaven 17, Special AKA, Howard Jones, Japan, Aswad, Sam Brown, and Julia Fordham. The duo also backed The Jam on their last ever TV performance on The Tube in 1982. In 1988, Wheeler withdrew from the group.

=== 1988–1990: Soul II Soul ===
In 1988, Wheeler met Jazzie B who asked her to become one of the founding members of Soul II Soul. At the time, the group consisted of Jazzie B, Caron Wheeler, Rose Windross, Doreen Waddell, Jazzie Q, Aitch Bee, and Nellee Hooper. The group began recording their first album in 1988. The following year, the group released their debut album, Club Classics Vol. One. The album spawned the major hits "Keep on Movin'" and "Back to Life (However Do You Want Me)", which featured Wheeler as lead vocalist and sold over one million copies worldwide each. The album established the group as a viable act in the music industry, with huge sales and winning the group a Soul Train Music Award for Best R&B/Urban Contemporary Album, Group, Band, or Duo, and two Grammy Awards for Best R&B Instrumental Performance for "African Dance", and Best R&B Performance by a Duo or Group with Vocal for "Back to Life (However Do You Want Me)".

In 1988, she sang backing vocals in the Erasure's song "Chains of Love".

In March 1989, Caron performed "Keep on Movin'" with Soul II Soul on Top of the Pops. She continued to tour with the group throughout the year but left Soul II Soul to begin recording her solo album.

=== 1990–1993: UK Blak and Beach of the War Goddess ===
In early 1990, Wheeler secured a recording contract with EMI. Her first solo album UK Blak was released on 15 May 1990. The album sold 60,000 copies in the UK, entered the UK Albums chart at number 14, and has since sold 100,000 copies worldwide. The album's lead single, "Livin' in the Light", became Caron's first number-one single as a solo artist in the US. The album also featured the singles "UK Blak", "Blue (Is the Colour of Pain)", and "Don't Quit", which also charted on UK singles chart.

In 1992, Wheeler returned to the studio and began recording her second album. She also recorded her lead vocals on a song entitled "Take Me Higher", which was featured on Soul II Soul's album Volume III Just Right. In October 1992, the album's lead single "I Adore You" was released with moderate success. The song was also featured on the soundtrack to the movie Mo' Money in July 1992. In February 1993, she released Beach of the War Goddess. Wheeler's second album also spawned the singles: "In Our Love", "Soul Street", and "Beach of the War Goddess".

=== 1994–1996: Return to Soul II Soul ===
In 1994, Wheeler was asked to rejoin Soul II Soul, for the recording of their fourth studio album Volume V: Believe. The line-up now consisted of Jazzie B, Charlotte Kelly, and Penny Ford. During the recording sessions, Wheeler and Jazzie B struggled with creative differences. Wheeler felt the group should have been producing more contemporary songs and not just replicating the old sound. However, the band retained the songs she had co-written but with other vocalists recording over her lead vocals. Wheeler was supposed to appear as the lead vocalist on the album's lead single "Love Enuff", but she opted not to finish the song. Fellow Soul II Soul member Penny Ford sang lead vocals with Wheeler only performing background vocals on the song. Wheeler ultimately left the group before the release of the album, but her lead vocals were still present on the songs "Ride On" and "Sunday".

In 1995, Wheeler recorded "Just the Two of Us" as a duet with Japanese singer Toshinobu Kubota for his album Sunshine, Moonlight. The song peaked at number 30 on Japan's Oricon Singles Chart. In 1996, a remix of "Keep On Movin'" was released and charted at number 31 on the UK singles chart.

=== 1997–2004: Music production ===
In 1997, Wheeler provided guest vocals on the song "You're Mine" for Eric Gadd's album The Right Way. In 1999, Wheeler released a single "Star", which peaked at number 82 on Billboard's Hot R&B/Hip-Hop Songs' chart. In 2001, Wheeler recorded the song "Open" with Pete Rock on the American hip hop production team Da Beatminerz's album Brace 4 Impak. In 2002, Wheeler was featured on Meshell Ndegeocello's Cookie: The Anthropological Mixtape.

In 2003, she performed the track "Another Star" to the Stevie Wonder tribute album Conception – An Interpretation of Stevie Wonder's Songs. She was featured on the song "Lonely" for Richard X's album, Richard X Presents His X-Factor Vol. 1.

In 2004, Wheeler released her live album Live at Duo Music Exchange. The album was recorded in Tokyo, Japan, and features live performances of her songs with various collaborators, including her musical director at the time, Maximina Juson, Da Beatminerz, and others. The live show also features songs Wheeler recorded during her time with Soul II Soul.

=== 2007–present: Return to Soul II Soul ===
In 2007, Wheeler reunited with Soul II Soul, at the time consisting of Jazzie B, Aitch Bee, and MC Chickaboo. The group began performing at local nightclubs and music festivals. In February 2009, Wheeler toured with the group in Australia where they performed at the Playground Weekender Festival. In July 2009, she received the Lifetime Achievement Award from the Lovers Rock Gala Awards.

In 2010, Soul II Soul reunited for a reunion tour with the lineup consisting of Jazzie B, Caron Wheeler, Rose Windross, Kym Mazelle, Charlotte Kelly, Aitch B, and MC Chickaboo. Following the conclusion of the tour, Wheeler briefly departed from the group. In June 2012, Wheeler was present with the members of Soul II Soul when they received the honorary PRS Heritage Plaque Award. She also performed with the group during the ceremony. They unveiled a plaque in Brixton, London, at the location where they played their first gig in 1991.

In 2013, Wheeler officially returned to Soul II Soul and began touring again with the group as the lead vocalist. During her interview with Jools Holland, Wheeler stated that she would be recording new music with Soul II Soul.

In 2016, Soul II Soul released a single "A New Day", featuring Louie Vega, which is credited to Caron Wheeler and Jazzie B. In November 2016, the group released a live album titled Origins: The Roots of Soul II Soul. In 2017, Wheeler made an appearance on her former Soul II Soul colleague Simon Law's album Look to the Sky on the lead single "Morning Love".

Wheeler was appointed Officer of the Order of the British Empire (OBE) in the 2023 Birthday Honours for services to music.

== Personal life ==
Wheeler attended Kingsdale Foundation School in south London in the late 70s. In 2004, Wheeler gave birth to her daughter Asha Star.

== Discography ==
- UK Blak (1990)
- Beach of the War Goddess (1993)

== Awards and nominations ==
=== Competitive ===
American Music Awards

Year	Nominee / work	Award	Result
1990	"Keep on Movin'"	Favorite Soul/R&B Single	Nominated
1990	"Back to Life (However Do You Want Me)"	Favorite Dance Single	Nominated

Brit Awards

Year	Nominee / work	Award	Result
1990	"Back to Life (However Do You Want Me)"	Best British Single	Nominated

Grammy Awards

Year	Nominee / work	Award	Result
1990	"Back to Life (However Do You Want Me)"	Best R&B Performance by a Duo or Group with Vocal	Won
1990	"African Dance"	Best R&B Instrumental Performance	Won

Juno Awards

Year	Nominee / work	Award	Result
1991	"Back to Life (However Do You Want Me)"	Best International Single of the Year	Nominated

Soul Train Music Awards

Year	Nominee / work	Award	Result
1990	"Keep on Movin'"	Best R&B/Urban Contemporary Song of the Year	Won
1990	"Keep on Movin'"	Best R&B/Urban Contemporary Single, Group, Band, or Duo	Won

=== Honorary ===
Lovers Rock Gala Awards

- 2009: Lifetime Achievement Award

PRS for Music Heritage Awards

- 2012: Lifetime Achievement Award (with Soul II Soul)

== See also ==
- List of Billboard number-one dance club songs
- List of artists who reached number one on the U.S. Dance Club Songs chart
- Kingsdale Foundation School
