= Brown Sugar (group) =

English vocal group

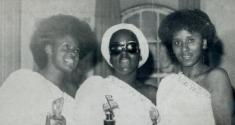
- Caron Wheeler – Pauline Catlin – Carol Simms

Background information
- Origin: London, England
- Genres: Reggae, lovers rock
- Years active: 1976–1983
- Labels: Lover's Rock, Studio 16, Decca
- Past members: Pauline Catlin; Caron Wheeler; Carol Simms

Brown Sugar was a British, London-based female vocal group who formed in 1976. The members were Pauline Catlin, Caron Wheeler and Carol Simms. Although short lived, the trio were influential and topped the British Reggae Chart on three occasions.

== History ==
Catlin and Wheeler attended the same school and often sang together for fun with Catlin coaching Wheeler in the art of harmonies. Inspired by many of the groups and artistes from the 1960s and early 1970s, they practised diligently together and went on to win a singing competition at the Bali Hai nightclub that stood next door to the Streatham Ice Rink in London. Bali Hai was synonymous with reggae music in the mid-1970s with one of the top-ranking sound systems in South London, Soferno B, taking a residence in the club on Sunday nights. The singing contest was organised circa 1976 by Castro Brown, a relative of Jamaican singer Dennis Brown, and the same partnership went on to establish a reggae record store and record label in South West London.

Catlin came across an article in the local press about a young girl named Carol Simms who wanted to be a singer and could play the piano. She made contact with her and they agreed to meet. Catlin convinced Simms to join her and Wheeler to form a singing trio, mirroring the American black girl groups of the 1960s like The Shirelles, The Crystals, The Ronettes and The Chantels. Catlin's mother came up with the name "Brown Sugar" as she said their skin tones were a natural shade of brown just like sugar or molasses from the Caribbean.

The group was recruited to the newly formed record label instigated by Dennis Harris, John Kpiaye and Dennis Bovell. Dennis Harris chose 'Lover's Rock' as the name of the record label, taken from the title of an Augustus Pablo track. The record label title became the adopted name for the genre of music.

Brown Sugar's first release in 1977 (and the first on the Lover's Rock label) was "I'm in Love with a Dreadlocks", written by guitarist John Kpiaye. The song married a rootsy theme with the sentiments of a love song. It was a hit with sound system owners and reggae lovers, and went on to reach the top spot in the British reggae charts. Further releases included a version of the Barbara Lewis 1963 Billboard chart-topper "Hello Stranger", and "Black Pride", a song penned by Kpiaye that celebrated black skin.

Following disillusionment with how the members were treated by their record label, the group temporarily separated. Let down by those who should have guided them, they were too young to appreciate the intricacies of the music business and the vast potential a music career could offer them. After the group's departure from the label, Harris released "Free", followed by "Forever My Darling" and "Do You Really Love Me". Catlin continued to record with her sister Carolyn and as Pauline from Brown Sugar. Wheeler and Simms (adopting the stage name of Kofi) went on to pursue solo careers.

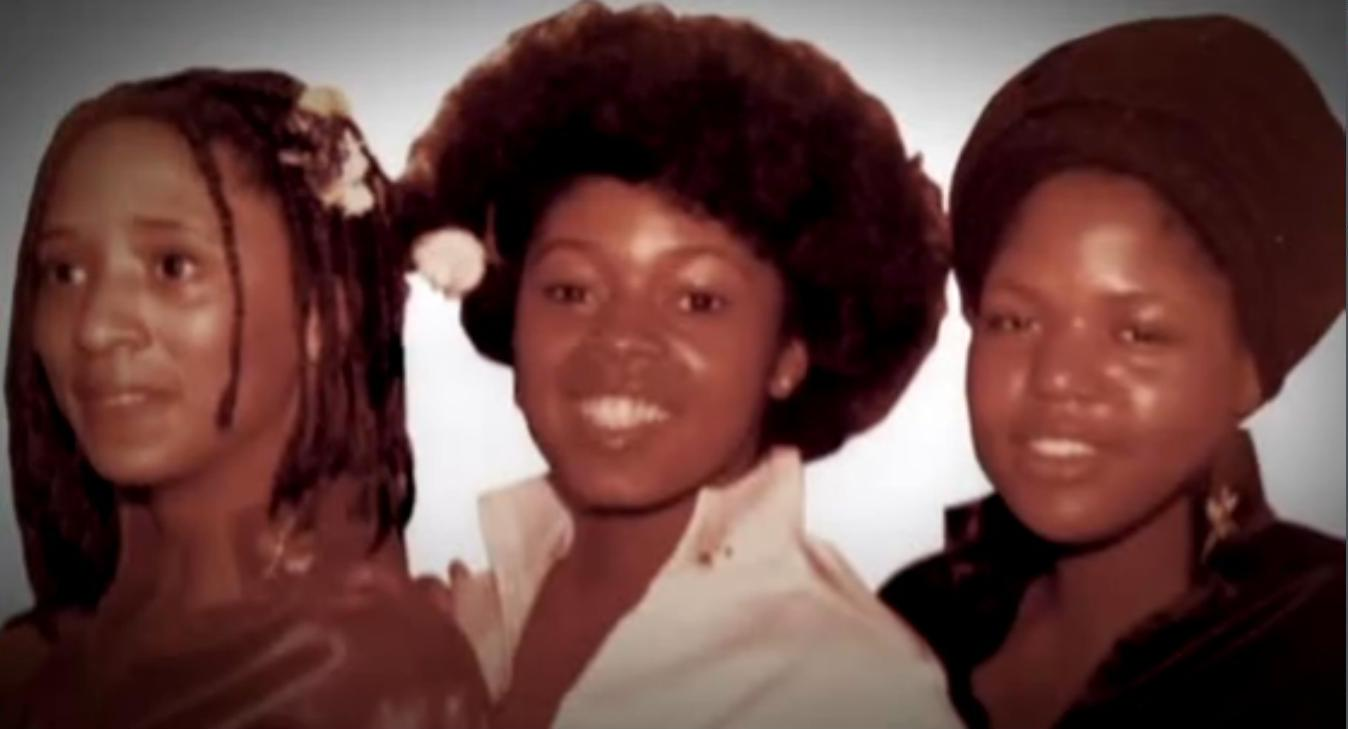
Carol Simms – Caron Wheeler – Pauline Catlin

In 1978 Brown Sugar reunited and embarked on a UK tour with Dennis Brown. Working with Studio 16 producer Winston Edwards, and inspired by Pat Kelly's hit "I Am So Proud", the trio released their own version of the Impressions' classic on the Decca/Studio 16 label in 1979. Other releases included "Our Reggae Music", "Confession Hurts", "Dreaming of Zion", and a rendition of John Holt's song "You And Your Smiling Face". They had another hit in 1983 with "Go Now".

The group won numerous awards including a Black Echoes magazine prize for 'Best Vocal Group', and performed with and supported many artists including Aswad and Janet Kay.

Wheeler and Catlin also worked as backing vocalists in the mid-1980s on recordings such as Keith Douglas's "Cool Down Amina".

After Brown Sugar, Wheeler went on to achieve mainstream success with Soul II Soul. Simms continued with a successful solo career and also worked with Soul II Soul for a brief period in 1992. During the 1980s Catlin began performing on the gospel circuit with a group called "Chosen" and in 2012 she relaunched a solo career under the moniker of Shezekiel.

The story of the group was partly related in the 2011 film The Story of Lovers Rock, directed by Menelik Shabazz. The film also featured music from Brown Sugar.

== Discography ==
=== Albums ===
- Brown Sugar (1977), Eve (unreleased)
- I'm In Love With A Dreadlocks (Brown Sugar And The Birth Of Lovers Rock 1977-80) (Soul Jazz, 2018)

=== Singles ===
- "I'm in Love with a Dreadlocks" (1977), Lover's Rock (7") – B-side "Dreadlocks a Sugar" by Jonny One Star
- "I'm in Love with a Dreadlocks"/"Loving Dreadlock" (1977), Rama (7")
- "Hello Stranger" (1977), Lover's Rock (7")
- "Black Pride" (1977), Lover's Rock (7")
- "Do You Really Love Me" (1978), Lover's Rock (7")
- "For Ever My Darling" b/w "Free" and "Albatross (Afro Connection)" (1978), Lover's Rock (12")
- "Our Reggae Music" (1979), Studio 16 (12")/Decca (7")
- "Confession Hurts" (1979), Studio 16
- "I am So Proud" (1979), Studio 16 – credited to Pauline & the Brown Sugar
- "Black Is The Colour"/"Hello Stranger" (1980), African Drums Music (12")
- "You and Your Smiling Face" (1981), Studio 16 (12")
- "Dreaming of Zion" (1981), Studio 16 (12")
- "Run Away Love" (198?), Studio 16 (12")
- "Go Now" (1983), El Jay – credited to Caron Wheeler/Brown Sugar
- "Hello Stranger", Ariwa
