= Lovers rock =

Style of reggae music noted for being romantic

- Stylistic origins: Rocksteady; reggae; soul; rhythm and blues
- Cultural origins: 1970s in London, England
- Typical instruments: Bass guitar; electric guitar; drum kit; keyboard; horn section
- Derivative forms: Reggae fusion

Other topics
- Music of Jamaica - List of reggae fusion artists

Lovers rock is a style of reggae music noted for its romantic sound and content. While love songs had been an important part of reggae since the late 1960s, the style was given a greater focus and a name in London in the mid-1970s.

== History ==
The roots of lovers rock lie in the last days of the rocksteady era and early days of reggae, with Jamaican and American singers such as Ken Boothe, Johnny Nash and John Holt enjoying international hits with versions of well-known love songs.

A style suited to the London reggae scene, lovers rock represented an apolitical counterpoint to the conscious Rastafarian sound dominant in Jamaica at the time, a continuation of the soulful and commonly love-themed rocksteady style, based on singers like Alton Ellis, who were not very optimistic about the rise of Rastafarian reggae. It combined the smooth soul sounds of Chicago and Philadelphia soul with rocksteady and reggae bassline rhythms. Rooted in the sound systems of South London, the style had particular appeal amongst women and produced many female stars including Carroll Thompson. Louisa Mark was aged 14 when she had a major lovers rock hit with her version of Robert Parker's "Caught You in a Lie" in 1975. This engendered the distinctive young girl female sound associated with early lovers rock.

Simplicity formed in 1975 and released their first hit "To Be in Love" produced by Lloyd Coxsone; the B-side was the Emotions' US R&B song, "A Feeling Is a Feeling". They were talent-spotted by Neville King who produced their UK reggae chart hit "Black Is Our Colour". This was followed by the husband and wife production team of Dennis and Eve Harris who then had a big hit with T.T. Ross's "Last Date". Dennis Harris then set up a new record label, Lover's Rock, at his South East London Studio on Upper Brockley Road along with John Kpiaye and Dennis Bovell, which gave the new genre a name.

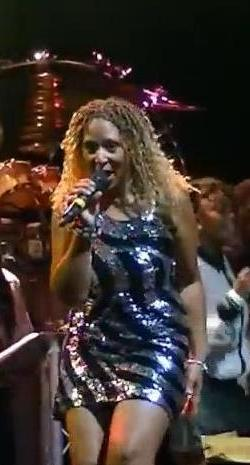
Kofi performing at the Giants of Lovers Rock event, 2012

South London trio Brown Sugar (including a young Caron Wheeler, later of Soul II Soul) pioneered a subgenre, 'conscious lovers', with songs such as "I'm in Love with a Dreadlocks" (1977) and "Black Pride". Others who released records in this subgenre included the Battersea singer Winsome and Kofi. Lovers rock became a staple of London's sound systems such as Chicken Hi-Fi, Success Sound, and Soferno B.

Seminal punk-rock-reggae crossover band the Clash popularised the term 'Lovers Rock', introducing it to a wider mainstream audience, by including a song called "Lover's Rock" on their 1979 signature double LP, London Calling.

Neil "Mad Professor" Fraser became a key lovers rock producer, working with Deborahe Glasgow, while Bovell produced one of the genre's biggest hits, Janet Kay's "Silly Games", which reached number 2 in the UK Singles Chart in 1979. Although noted for the preponderance and youth of its female exponents, the new style produced male stars as well, including Honey Boy Martin, Trevor Walters, Honey Boy, and Winston Reedy. The trend also saw the emergence of many male groups, including Tradition, The Investigators and the Birmingham group Beshara, who in 1981, had the emotive reggae chart hit "Men Cry Too".

Subsequently, numerous well-established Jamaican acts attempted the new sound. Most successful among these were Gregory Isaacs, Dennis Brown, Sugar Minott, and later Freddie McGregor. Brown's "Money in My Pocket" (#14 in 1979) and Minott's "Good Thing Going" (#4 in 1981) were both successful hits on the UK Singles Chart.

Other lovers rock singers were Junior Murvin, Beres Hammond, Horace Andy, Kofi, Sanchez, Samantha Rose, and Marcia Aitken.

The popularity of lovers rock continued through the next decade. In the 1980s, the Fashion label was successful with UK audiences, and the Revue label had a chart-topper in 1986 with Boris Gardiner's "I Wanna Wake Up with You".In 1986, Maxi Priest got together with Drummie Zeb, Brinsley Forde and Tony Gad of Aswad, chanteuse Carroll Thompson, (aka "Queen of Lovers Rock" ),Barry Boom, Mafia & Fluxy and Trevor Hartley of Burning Rockers with Godwin Logie on the mixing desk to create their own version of Van Morrison’s track "Crazy Love", which was released as a single, and also featured on Priest’s second album, Intentions, also released in 1986. Maxi Priest also gained lovers rock hits with his 1988 version of the Cat Stevens hit, Wild World (song) and "Close to You" in 1990.

Throughout the 1980s and continuing into the 1990s up to the present time, artists such as Mike Anthony, Trevor Hartley, Peter Hunnigale, Don Campbell (musician), Bitty Mclean, Peter Spence and Donna Marie attained significant breakthroughs with the musical form, and continue to enjoy success with the genre, and several British stars performed at Reggae Sunsplash.

== Influence ==
The genre of lovers rock has heavily influenced the R&B, hip hop and pop music scenes since its peak in the 1960s and 1970s. Songs incorporating a mixture of love and romance, politics and reggae-inspired sounds have become an accepted trend in music. Steve McQueen's Lovers Rock film (with Dennis Bovell in a minor role), released in December 2020, chronicled a night at a 1980 blues party in West London in which lovers rock music played a central part in both the storyline and soundtrack.

Lovers rock has been heavily constructed in line with romantic sound and themes. Lisa Palmer's "Men Cry Too: Black Masculinities and the Feminisation of Lovers Rock in the UK" discusses the lyrical contents found within this genre, which are notable due to how they shaped its gendering and politicization. For instance, the song "Men Cry Too/Man a Reason" was important because it "captured the sense of loss, longing, and vulnerability that was part of black male life in Britain, but was and remains frequently overshadowed by the notion that black masculinity within the British roots reggae music scene is constructed upon the paradigm of political resistance and protest detached from emotional or erotic expression" (Palmer 128).

Lovers Rock, a studio album by Sade, draws inspiration from the Lovers rock genre.

== Politics ==
Because the majority of its audience were women, and it tended to have a romantic influence in sound and lyrics, lovers rock was often seen as intrinsically apolitical, whereas roots reggae and the black masculinity associated with it had clear political messages of emancipation and liberation. While not as explicitly politically conscious as other subgenres of reggae, lovers rock was indeed political, however, “never [steering] too far away from the politics of romantic love and heartbreak”.

Lovers rock, being indigenous to Britain with strong Jamaican influences, emerged with regard to the cultural and political environments of the time for Caribbean people in the United Kingdom. It engaged with politics for the female face of the genre, as well as for the male-dominated production and ownership of the genre. It portrayed patriarchal discourses through its creation of politically contentious erotic spaces that challenged racism, while also encapsulating the struggles of gendered oppression dealt with by women. Though much more subtle than other politically outspoken music, lovers rock did portray its own stance on the political climate of Britain in the mid-1970s.

Lovers rock, moreover, was an indicator of social change and cultural changes within Black and Caribbean communities living in the UK. As opposed to the singularity espoused by reggae music, lovers rock, encouraged people to engage with one another in hopes of finding a love interest. This allowed for new dynamics of sex and gender, with women having more personal autonomy on the dance floor and a choice of who to engage or not engage romantically with.

There's a "faulty logic follow(ing) dominant perceptions within wider patriarchal cultures that love is not political and is ultimately female work" (Palmer 117). "While there remains much to celebrate within lovers rock’s historical legacy, sentimentality has given way to tackling the more challenging question of how black Britons are now imagining new discourses on black freedom that take seriously the gendered and erotic entanglements that shape and define our visions of black liberation," (Palmer 129). In an anti-black world that constantly places black people in a separate category as human, anything fighting against these notions is a push towards liberation. Love is the quintessential human feeling and by expressing it, the artists of lovers rock and other black genres are showing the humanity of black people and pushing towards liberation.

The genres of Brit funk and lovers rock also displayed an interesting interrogation of a black African diaspora that received far less attention from mainstream music society; its portrayals of black diasporic identities in the United Kingdom at the time are unlike any other culture in the history of black music. Strachan states that being black and British, much like the thesis of "The Black Atlantic", involves quite a bit of maneuvering as far as identities go. The identities went far beyond that of just Black Brits, as well as the musical influences. Much like how lovers rock and Brit funk have allowed for many genres to interact that never would have, many of these identities were introduced to each other for the first time. Though the genres were very much framed apolitically, as these tracks were the ones that received radio time, there was still a deep emphasis on the identity of the artists and listeners as marginalized in every sense. Many tracks displayed this, as well as artist interviews, but these received far less airtime.

According to sociologist Lisa Amanda Palmer, the patriarchal structures within lovers rock dictated female success as men were often the DJs and producers in that space. She cites the experience of Carroll Thompson, who created her own company (in which she maintained complete creative control of her projects) because she was tired of the sexist and prejudice attitudes within the industry. She also argues that these patriarchal structures are inherently harmful to both men and women. Pointedly, this gendering neglects the men who were allowed to be emotionally expressive and vulnerable within the context of lovers rock such as Beshara’s 1981 track “Men Cry Too” which highlighted the emotions that consumed Black British men. Furthermore, this gendering creates a tension between political protest and the emotional/erotic. Additionally, it places femininity in opposition to Black political protest. The gendering of Black diasporic music is commonplace, but lovers rock makes it clear that Black femininity is not inherently oppositional to Black power. Ultimately, Palmer asserts that lovers rock and roots reggae are not oppositional, but instead demonstrate the many forms of Black expression in a period of extreme racialization and prejudice.

== See also ==
- List of lovers rock artists
