= Jet Star (record distribution company) =

British record distribution company

- Parent company: Phoenix Music International
- Founded: 1978
- Founder: Carl Palmer
- Genre: Reggae, dancehall, ragga, jungle
- Country of origin: United Kingdom
- Official website: www.jetstar.co.uk

Jet Star (formally Jet Star Phonographics Ltd.) is a British record distribution company that grew out of Pama Records in 1978. It was one of the largest distributors of reggae music, the company claimed that it was "the world's largest reggae distributors".

== History ==
Jet Star was formed in 1978 by the Palmer Brothers, who had previously run Pama Records. The new company began releasing records on its Charm label. The Reggae Hits series was started in 1984 and became the world's longest-running series of reggae compilations. Further series' of album releases followed, such as the specialist ‘Just Ragga’ and ‘Pure Lovers’ titles alongside the ground-breaking ‘Jungle Hits’ series. This saw Jet Star showcasing exciting underground styles to the mainstream public for the very first time. The ‘Reggae Gold’ series, launched with collections featuring Chaka Demus & Pliers, Beenie Man, Capleton and the late Garnett Silk, are considered among the best introductions to the artists featured.

In 2008, Jet Star went into administration and was sold to Phoenix Music International Ltd who continue to distribute the Jet Star label digitally.
