= Soul II Soul discography =

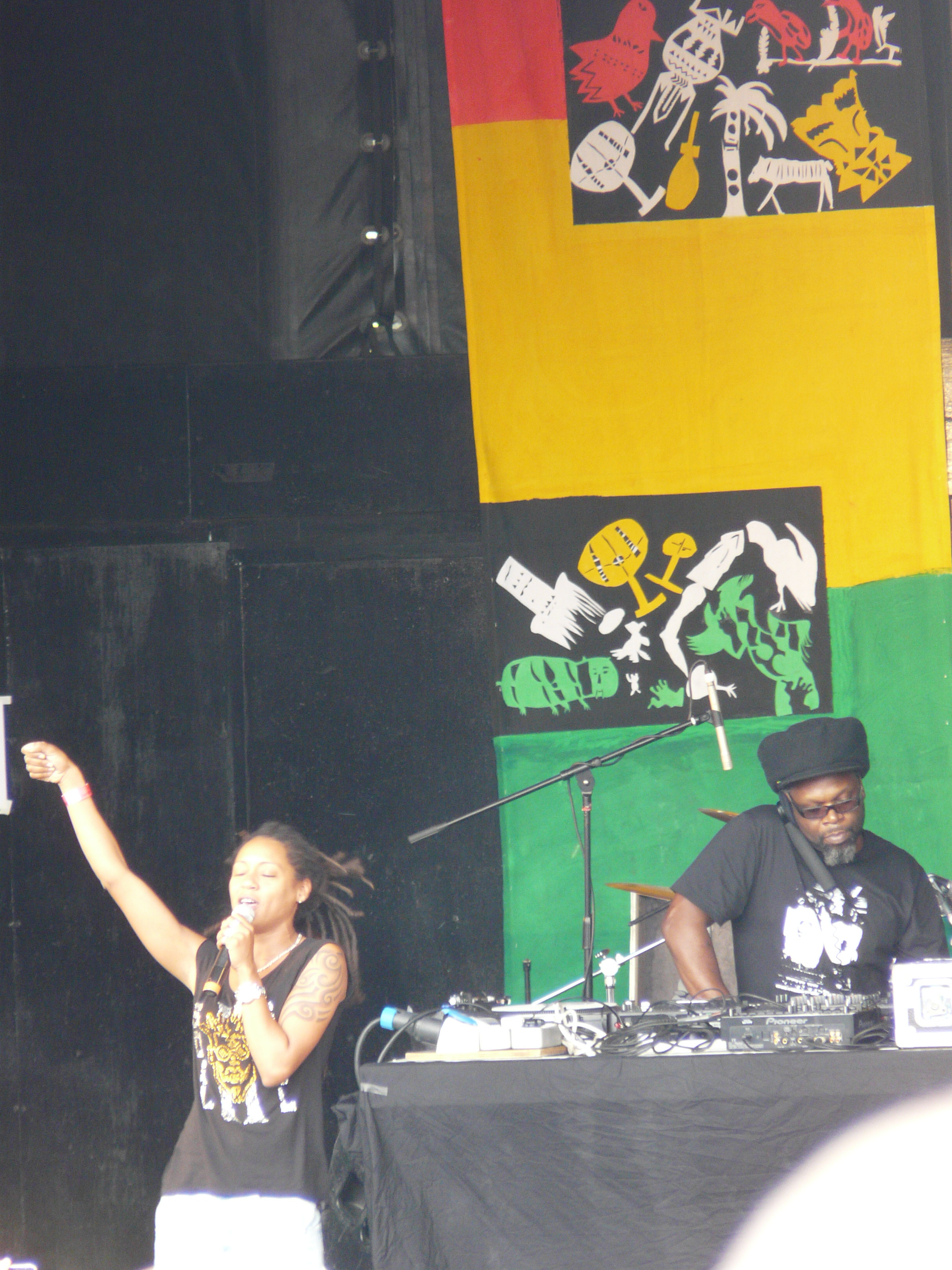
- Soul II Soul feat MC Chickaboo, Lambeth Country Show 2010, Brockwell Park
- Studio albums: 5
- Live albums: 2
- Compilation albums: 2
- Singles: 18
- Video albums: 1
- Music videos: 18

British musical group Soul II Soul has released five studio albums, two compilation albums, two live albums, and 18 singles.

Soul II Soul released their debut album Club Classics Vol. One in April 1989 and it peaked at number 1 on the UK Albums Chart. It peaked at number 14 on the US Billboard 200 albums chart and earned a 2× platinum certification in the United States by the Recording Industry Association of America (RIAA). The album's top singles, "Keep On Movin'" and "Back to Life (However Do You Want Me)", reached number one on the Billboard R&B chart and were certified platinum by the RIAA. Second album, Vol. II: 1990 – A New Decade, was released in May 1990. Their subsequent releases after their debut album were not as successful in the US, but their second release peaked at number 1 on the UK Albums chart. The first and second single, "Get a Life" and "A Dreams a Dream", charted in the top ten on the UK Singles Chart.

The group's third album, Volume III Just Right, was released in April 1992 and reached number three on the UK Albums Chart. The lead single "Joy" reached number 4 in the UK and the follow-up single "Move Me No Mountain" charted at number 31. In November 1993, a greatest hits compilation titled Volume IV The Classic Singles 88–93 was released. After a three-year hiatus working on solo projects, the group reunited to record their fourth studio album, Volume V Believe, released in July 1995. The album reached number thirteen in the UK. Two singles were released from the album: "Love Enuff" and "I Care". The first two singles charted in top twenty in UK. A final studio album, Time for Change, was released in September 1997 following their split. As of 2016, they have sold over ten million records worldwide.

== Albums ==
=== Studio albums ===
List of studio albums, with selected details, chart positions and certifications
Title	Album details	Peak chart positions								Certifications
Title	Album details	UK	AUS	CAN	GER	NL	NZ	US	US R&B /HH	Certifications
Club Classics Vol. One^{[A]}	Release date: 10 April 1989; Label: 10, Virgin	1	38	7	13	16	8	14	1	BPI: 3× Platinum; MC: Platinum; RMNZ: Gold; RIAA: 2× Platinum
Vol. II: 1990 – A New Decade	Release date: 21 May 1990; Label: 10, Virgin	1	9	29	15	9	4	21	14	BPI: Platinum; ARIA: Gold; MC: Gold; RIAA: Gold
Volume III Just Right	Release date: 13 April 1992; Label: 10, Virgin	3	17	63	29	25	13	88	32	BPI: Gold
Volume V Believe	Release date: 31 July 1995; Label: 10, Virgin	13	71	—	77	78	—	—	67	
Time for Change	Release date: 1 September 1997; Label: Island	80	175	—	—	—	—	—	—	
"—" denotes a recording that did not chart or was not released in that territory.

- ^{A} Club Classics Vol. One was released as Keep on Movin' in North America..

=== Live albums ===
List of live albums, with selected details
Title	Album details
A New Decade: Live from Brixton Academy	Release date: 22 September 1990; Label: Virgin
Origins: The Roots of Soul II Soul	Release date: 9 December 2016; Label: Metropolis London Music
Live at Roundhouse	Release date: 23 May 2025; Label: Funki Dred Records

=== Compilation albums ===
List of compilation albums, with selected chart positions and certifications
Title	Album details	Peak chart positions			Certifications
Title	Album details	UK	AUS	NZ	Certifications
Volume IV The Classic Singles 88–93	Release date: 15 November 1993; Label: 10, Virgin	10	193	48	BPI: Platinum
Classic Masters	Release date: 1 April 2003; Label: Virgin	—	—	—	
"—" denotes a recording that did not chart or was not released in that territory.

== Singles ==
List of singles, with selected chart positions and certifications
Title	Year	Peak chart positions										Certifications	Album
Title	Year	UK	AUS	CAN	GER	IRE	NL	NZ	US	US R&B /HH	US Dance	Certifications	Album
"Fairplay" (featuring Rose Windross)	1988	63	—	—	—	—	—	—	—	—	—		Club Classics Vol. One
"Feel Free" (featuring Do'reen)	1988	64	—	—	—	—	—	—	—	—	—		Club Classics Vol. One
"Keep on Movin'" (featuring Caron Wheeler)	1989	5	77	15	13	10	9	14	11	1	1	BPI: Silver; MC: Gold; RIAA: Platinum	Club Classics Vol. One
"Back to Life (However Do You Want Me)" (featuring Caron Wheeler)	1989	1	45	11	4	6	1	4	4	1	1	BPI: Platinum; GLF: Gold; MC: Gold; RIAA: Platinum; RMNZ: Gold	Club Classics Vol. One
"Jazzie's Groove"	1989	—	—	—	—	—	—	—	—	6	3		Club Classics Vol. One
"Get a Life" (featuring Marcia Lewis)	1989	3	38	84	6	6	2	5	54	5	9	BPI: Silver	Vol. II: 1990 – A New Decade
"A Dreams a Dream" (featuring Victoria Wilson-James)	1990	6	27	—	15	12	6	8	85	19	3		Vol. II: 1990 – A New Decade
"People" (featuring Marcia Lewis)	1990	—	90	—	46	—	17	49	—	44	3		Vol. II: 1990 – A New Decade
"Missing You" (featuring Kym Mazelle)	1990	22	166	—	—	24	74	—	—	29	39		Vol. II: 1990 – A New Decade
"Joy" (featuring Richie Stephens)	1992	4	41	—	21	11	19	18	—	14	—		Volume III Just Right
"Move Me No Mountain" (featuring Kofi)	1992	31	96	—	—	—	62	40	—	33	29		Volume III Just Right
"Just Right" (featuring Rick Clarke)	1992	38	160	—	—	—	—	—	—	—	—		Volume III Just Right
"Wish" (featuring Melissa Bell)	1993	24	141	—	—	—	—	27	—	—	—		Volume IV The Classic Singles 88–93
"Love Enuff" (featuring Penny Ford)	1995	12	76	—	74	—	—	—	—	61	35		Volume V Believe
"I Care" (featuring Charlotte Kelly)	1995	17	—	—	—	—	—	—	—	—	—		Volume V Believe
"Keep on Movin'" ('96 Remixes)	1996	31	—	—	—	—	—	—	—	—	—		—N/a
"Represent"	1997	39	—	—	—	—	—	—	—	—	—		Time for Change
"Pleasure Dome"	1997	51	—	—	—	—	—	—	—	—	—		Time for Change
"—" denotes a recording that did not chart or was not released in that territory.

== Other appearances ==
List of other appearances by Soul II Soul
Song	Year	Album
"Kiss the Girl"	1991	Simply Mad About the Mouse
"Free Again"	1998	How Stella Got Her Groove Back
