= Volume IV The Classic Singles 88–93 =

Greatest hits album by Soul II Soul
- Released: 1993
- Length: 63:37
- Label: Virgin
- Producer: Jazzie B; Nellee Hooper

Soul II Soul chronology
| Volume III Just Right (1992) | Volume IV The Classic Singles 88–93 (1993) | Volume V Believe (1995) |

Professional ratings
Review scores
| Source | Rating |
|---|---|
| AllMusic | 4.5/5 stars |
| Select | 2/5 medals |

Volume IV The Classic Singles 88–93 is the first greatest hits album by British group Soul II Soul, released in 1993. Along with the band's biggest hit singles released up to 1993, the album also includes one new song, "Wish".

== Track listing ==
1. "Back to Life (However Do You Want Me)" – 3:50
2. "Keep On Movin'" – 3:39
3. "Get a Life" – 3:42
4. "A Dreams a Dream" – 4:12
5. "Missing You" – 4:53
6. "Just Right" – 3:53
7. "Move Me No Mountain" – 3:24
8. "People" – 3:52
9. "Fairplay" – 3:58
10. "Jazzie's Groove" – 5:03
11. "Wish" – 4:26
12. "Joy" – 4:12
13. "Keep On Movin'" (Mafia & Fluxy Mix) – 5:03
14. "Fairplay" (Ethnic Boys Mix) – 5:34
15. "Back to Life" (Bonus Beats) – 3:26

== Personnel ==
Adapted from AllMusic.

- Melissa Bell – performer, primary artist
- Dave Darlington – mixing engineer
- Eugene Eugenius Ellis – engineer
- Kenny "Dope" Gonzalez – mixing
- Nellee Hooper – producer
- David James – art direction
- Jazzie B – producer
- Marcie Lewis – performer
- Kym Mazelle – performer
- Richie Stephens – performer
- Caron Wheeler – performer
- Rose Windross – performer

== Charts ==
=== Weekly charts ===
Weekly chart performance
| Chart (1993–94) | Peak position |
|---|---|
| New Zealand Albums (RMNZ) | 48 |
| UK Albums (OCC) | 10 |

=== Year-end charts ===
Year-end chart performance
| Chart (1993) | Position |
|---|---|
| UK Albums (OCC) | 52 |

== Certifications ==
Certifications and sales
| Region | Certification | Certified units/sales |
|---|---|---|
| United Kingdom (BPI) | Platinum | 300,000^{^} |
^{^} Shipments figures based on certification alone.
