= Efua Baker =

- Birth name: Efua Baker
- Born: c. 1967; Ghana
- Occupations: Singer; songwriter; fitness expert; personal trainer
- Labels: Virgin

Efua Baker (/ˈɛfwə/ EF-wə; born c. 1967 in Ghana) is a British celebrity fitness expert and trainer who also had a music career in the 1990s.

== Career ==
In 1993, Baker, then known as just Efua, released three singles: "Down Is the Drop", "Strawberry Boy", and "Somewhere". "Somewhere" was her biggest hit, reaching the top 50 in the UK, and the top 20 in Australia. "Strawberry Boy" charted on the US Billboard Bubbling Under R&B/Hip-Hop Singles chart. An album, Dream Juice, was released in June 1993 in the US, and in November 1993 in Australia.

Prior to releasing her own music, Efua worked as a model and a dancer, and appeared in a number of music videos for other artists, including Clive Griffin's "The Way We Touch" and "Don't Make Me Wait", Lil Louis's "I Called U", Soul II Soul's "A Dreams a Dream", and one of the two videos filmed for Maxi Priest's "Close to You". In 1996, she appeared in Yazz's music video for "Good Thing Going". In 2019, Baker appeared in the music video for FKA Twigs' "Cellophane".

Baker's best known work as a fitness expert was on the BBC One programme Fat Nation - the Big Challenge in late 2004.

== Personal life ==
She is married to music producer and Soul II Soul frontman Jazzie B, and they are parents to actress Jessye Romeo and footballer Mahlon Romeo.

== Discography ==
=== Albums ===
Album	Detail	Peak chart positions
Album	Detail	AUS
Dream Juice	Released: 1993; Label: Virgin Records	140

=== Singles ===
Year	Single	Peak chart positions			Album
Year	Single	UK	AUS	US R&B/ Hip-Hop Bubbling Under	Album
1993	"Down Is the Drop" (European release)	87	–	–	Dream Juice
1993	"Strawberry Boy"	–	–	8	Dream Juice
1993	"Somewhere"	42	16	–	Dream Juice
1994	"Down Is the Drop" (Australian release)	–	122	–	Dream Juice
"–" denotes releases that did not chart or were not released in that country.
