= Out of Karma =

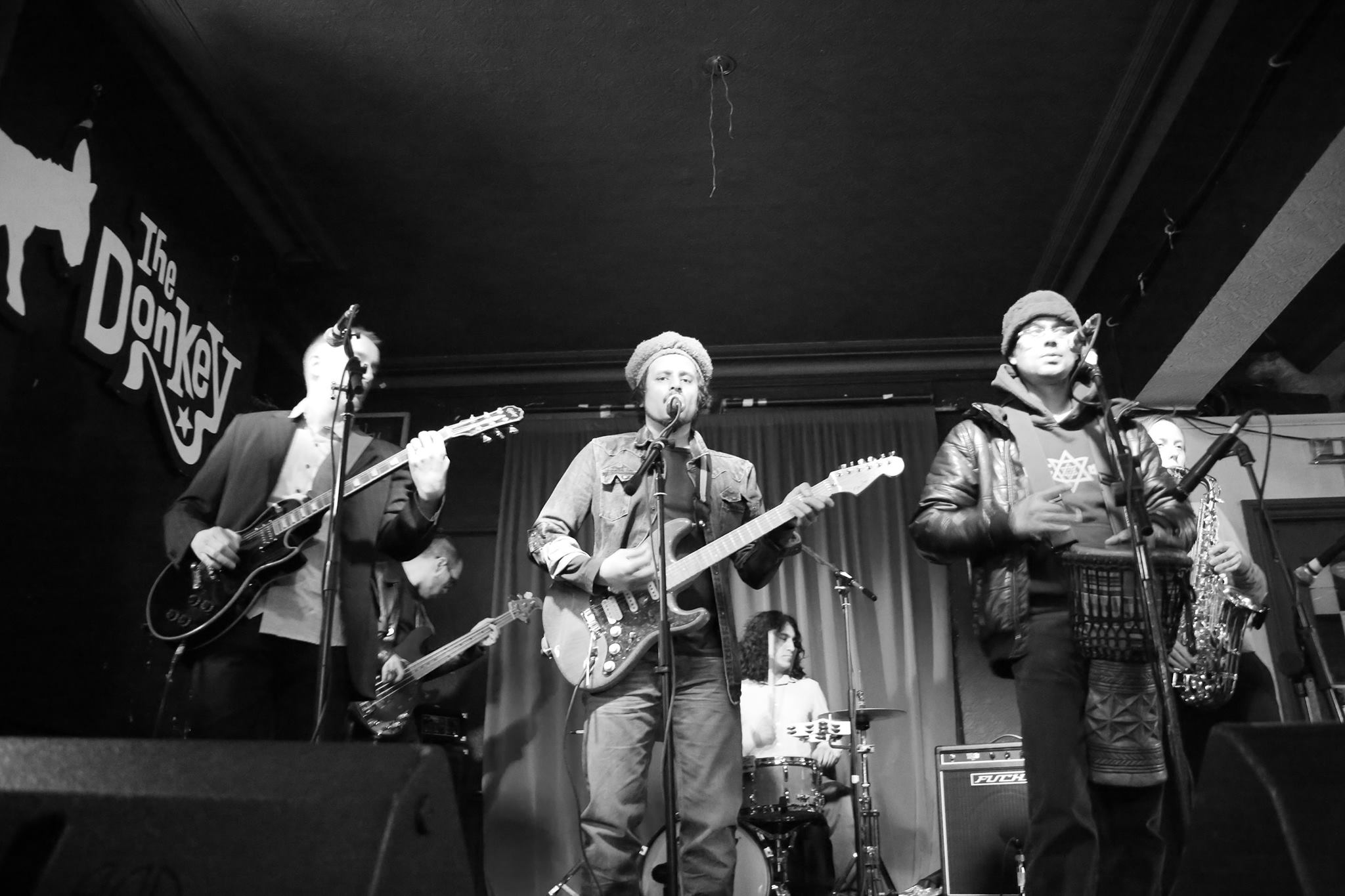
- Out of Karma live at The Donkey, Leicester, March 2016

Background information
- Origin: Leicester, Leicestershire, England
- Genres: World, Jazz, Reggae, Funk rock
- Years active: 2004 – present
- Members: Joseph Macwan; Ameer Hosseinbucus; Pascal Pereira; Dan Marsden; Alex Bogle; Additional support from: Chris Topham; Suraj Kika; Malcolm D’Sa; Katherine Friedmann
- Website: http://www.outofkarma.com/

Out of Karma is a band formed in Leicester, UK. The core line up consists of singer songwriter Joseph Macwan, Ameer Hosseinbucus providing the beats and Pascal Pereira on bass and Alexandra Bogle on backing vocals.

Described as a blend of World, Jazz Reggae and Soul, reflecting the band's heritage with sounds and flavours evoking India, Africa, the Indian Ocean Islands and Europe, the band's first single "Hero" was well received and appeared on the "Brown Punk" record label created by Tricky of Massive Attack and Chris Blackwell of Palm Pictures/Island Records. Jazzie B of Soul II Soul being a fan of their “..great new music” invited Out of Karma to perform at Victoria Park London in front of 80 000 fans .

In September 2017, Out of Karma released 'This Life' - a single and video single which was also the title track of an EP the band released later that year.

In May 2018, the band released a video single for 'Gunshot', a re-worked and re-released track from the 'This Life EP' (due for release in summer 2018). The video reflects current events in the war in Syria and was released in protest of the continual international bombing of the now war torn nation. Singer songwriter Joseph Macwan described the song as portraying "the vile nature of 'Gunshot' in all its manifestations, whether it be in the streets of Syria, West Virginia, London, Compton, Kingston...". The band released a video for every track on the EP to create a visual representation of the story that 'This Life' tells.

February 2020 saw the release of the bands next single "Crazy Times" video single a critique of social media obsessiveness followed in November of that year with "Sanctified" a beautiful love song. video single

The release of "Sliding Souls" video single. in May 2021 reflected on lost times with the worldwide pandemic and ensuing madness of social isolation. The song exposed the band to a wider audience, and became the BBC single of the week later that month.

2022 saw the release of four new song: "We've Found A Better Way", "Green and Pleasant Land" a song which reflects upon the dehumanising experience of having to seek refuge in a new land, "Gethsemane" and "Trouble In My Soul" featuring the drumming of Wilburn Anthony 'Squidly' Cole.

In 2023 the band released "Riding Time" and "Infotainment" video single which went on to become the BBC Track of the week.

2024 and 2025 saw the release of "Walk on Clouds" video single, "Amazing Grace" and "Sleepwalking" video single which again became BBC Track of the week.

The band are currently recording new songs for release in 2026.
