= Into My World =

Into My World may refer to:

- "Into My World", a 1996 song by Audioweb
- "Into My World", a 2000 song by Melissa Bell and Dazz
- "Into My World", a 2018 song by Exo from Countdown
