= MC Chickaboo =

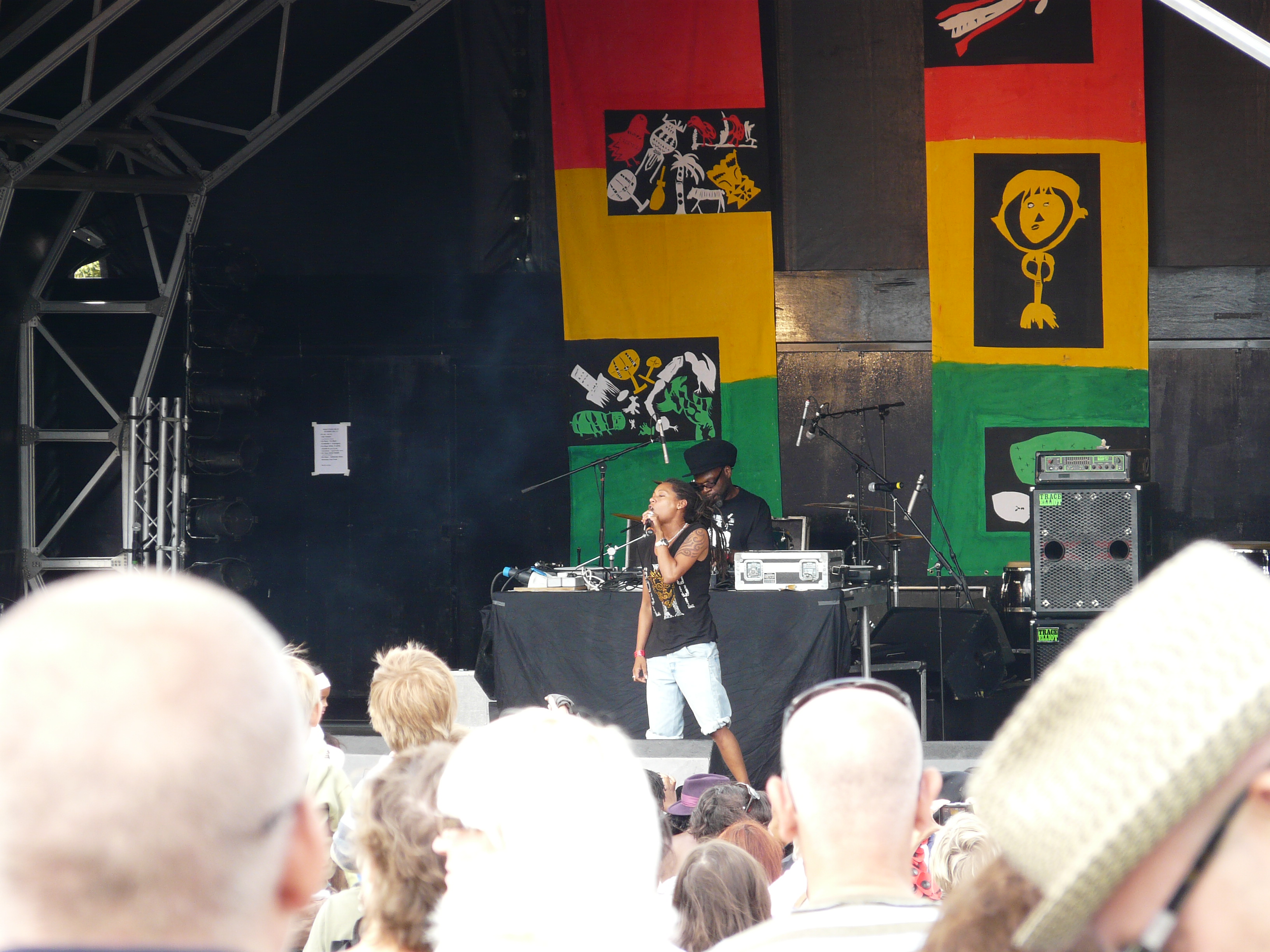
- MC Chickaboo, Lambeth Country Show 2010, Brockwell Park, London

Background information
- Born: Jeanine Green
- Origin: London, England
- Genres: Electronic

MC Chickaboo is an English rapper. In 2002, her collaboration with Timo Maas', "Shifter", went to number one on the Billboard Hot Dance Music/Club Play chart.

MC Chickaboo started out in Birmingham in 1992 with GE Real working the big raves such as Fantasia, Dreamscape and Jungle Fever. Whilst working in the electronic music scene, Chickaboo collaborated with producers including DJ Dazee, DJ Craze, Jumping Jack Frost, DJ Storm, DJ Bailey, Goldie and Afrika Bambaata.

Chickaboo exploded into the breakbeat scene and before long was working with top producers and DJs alike including Timo Maas, Rennie Pilgrem and Superstyle Deluxe, among others. She is the frontwoman for Rennie Pilgrem's band TCR Allstars who have performed at a number of festivals and clubs including Glade, Glastonbury and Fabric. It was with Rennie Pilgrem and BLIM she won "best song" at Breakspoll 2006.

She has written, performed and recorded vocals for many producers including: Timo Maas, Rennie Pilgrem, General Midi, Suda (Faithless), Bitches Brew, Jeans Jacques Smoothie, Stabilizer, Superstyle Deluxe and BLIM. In 2004, Chickaboo started working with the original Funky Dred Jazzie B OBE and regularly tours with the Soul II Soul Sound System, which includes festivals, intimate parties, corporate events and the Back II Life festival in Antigua, as well as having supported artists like Alicia Keys, Mary J. Blige and Blondie.

== See also ==
- List of number-one dance hits (United States)
- List of artists who reached number one on the US Dance chart
