= Vol. II: 1990 – A New Decade =

Studio album by Soul II Soul
- Released: 21 May 1990
- Recorded: 1989–90
- Genre: Electronica; R&B; new jack swing
- Length: 46:23
- Label: Virgin
- Producer: Jazzie B.; Nellee Hooper

Soul II Soul chronology
Club Classics Vol. One (1989)	Vol. II: 1990 – A New Decade (1990)	Volume III Just Right (1992)

Singles from Vol. II: 1990 – A New Decade
- 1. "Get a Life" Released: 27 November 1989; 2. "A Dreams a Dream" Released: 1990; 3. "Missing You" Released: 12 November 1990; 4. "People" Released: 1990

Vol. II: 1990 – A New Decade is the second album by British musical collective Soul II Soul. Released in 1990, it contains three UK hits: "Get a Life", which reached No. 3 in the UK singles chart (No. 54 on the US Billboard Hot 100), "A Dreams a Dream", which made No. 6 (No. 85 on the Hot 100), and "Missing You", which reached No. 22. The album reached No. 1 in the UK Albums Chart in May 1990.

Vol. II was recorded following the departure of Caron Wheeler (the Soul II Soul collective's best known singer). Guest performers on this album include singers Kym Mazelle, Lamya, Marcia Lewis, and Victoria Wilson-James, saxophonist Courtney Pine and New York hip-hop scenester Fab 5 Freddy.

== Critical reception ==
Professional ratings
Review scores
Source	Rating
AllMusic	4/5 stars
Chicago Tribune	3.5/4 stars
Entertainment Weekly	A
Los Angeles Times	2/5 stars
NME	9/10
Record Mirror	3/5
Rolling Stone	3/5 stars
The Rolling Stone Album Guide	3.5/5 stars
Sounds	4/5 stars
The Village Voice	A−

Reviewing Vol. II for Spin, Nathaniel Wice found Soul II Soul's music successful at communicating positivity "in a sly, critical way." "Soul II Soul's harmony," he wrote, "works because it is part of a movement defined in adversity to racism, materialism and Britain's attempts to regulate parties."

== Track listing ==
No.	Title	Writer(s)	Length
1.	"Get a Life"	Trevor Beresford Romeo; Hayden Maclaren Browne	3:42
2.	"Love Come Through"	Romeo; Michael McEvoy; Lamya Almugheira	4:30
3.	"People"	Romeo; Browne	4:55
4.	"Missing You"	Romeo; Simon Law; Kym Mazelle	5:24
5.	"Courtney Blows"	Romeo; Browne	4:33
6.	"1990 A New Decade"	Romeo; Tony Campbell	4:01
7.	"A Dreams a Dream"	Romeo; Law	5:37
8.	"Time (Untitled)"	Romeo; Browne	6:05
9.	"In the Heat of the Night"	Romeo; Browne	3:39
10.	"Our Time Has Now Come"	Romeo; Browne; Campbell	3:57

== Personnel ==
- Jazzie B – musical director, co-producer, mixing, vocals on "Get a Life" & "Our Time Has Now Come"
- Nellee Hooper – co-producer, mixing
- Tony "Dobie" Campbell – assistant producer
- Howard Bernstein – engineer
- Marcia Lewis – vocals on "Get a Life", "People"
- Philip "Daddae" Harvey – vocals on "Get a Life"; guitars/percussion/keyboards (uncredited)
- Lamya Hafidh Sultan Al-Mugheiry – lead vocals on "Love Come Through" & "In the Heat of the Night"; background vocals on "Missing You"
- Kym Mazelle – vocals on "Missing You"
- Courtney Pine – saxophone on "Courtney Blows"
- Pinise Saul – vocals on "1990 A New Decade" & "Our Time Has Now Come"
- Sonti Mndebele – vocals on "1990 A New Decade" & "Our Time Has Now Come"
- Nomsa Caluza – vocals on "1990 A New Decade" & "Our Time Has Now Come"
- Bambi Fazakerley – vocals on "1990 A New Decade" & "Our Time Has Now Come"
- Victoria Wilson-James – vocals on "A Dreams a Dream"
- Fred "Fab 5 Freddy" Brathwaite – vocals on "Our Time Has Now Come"
- Simon Law – keyboards (uncredited)
- Michael McEvoy – piano on "People", "A Dreams a Dream" & "Time"; keyboards on "Love Come Through" & "Missing You"

== Charts ==
=== Weekly charts ===
Chart (1990)	Peak position
Australian Albums (ARIA)	9
Austrian Albums (Ö3 Austria)	15
Dutch Albums (Album Top 100)	9
German Albums (Offizielle Top 100)	15
New Zealand Albums (RMNZ)	4
Swedish Albums (Sverigetopplistan)	12
Swiss Albums (Schweizer Hitparade)	14
UK Albums (OCC)	1
US Billboard 200	21
US Top R&B/Hip-Hop Albums (Billboard)	14

=== Year-end charts ===
Chart (1990)	Position
German Albums (Offizielle Top 100)	95
New Zealand Albums (RMNZ)	43
US Top R&B/Hip-Hop Albums (Billboard)	56

== Certifications ==
Region	Certification	Certified units/sales
Australia (ARIA)	Gold	35,000^{^}
Canada (Music Canada)	Gold	50,000^{^}
United Kingdom (BPI)	Platinum	300,000^{^}
United States (RIAA)	Gold	500,000^{^}
^{^} Shipments figures based on certification alone.

== See also ==
- List of number-one albums from the 1990s (UK)
