= Volume III Just Right =

Studio album by Soul II Soul
- Released: 13 April 1992
- Genre: R&B
- Length: 41:54
- Labels: Ten; Virgin
- Producer: Jazzie B

Soul II Soul chronology
Vol. II: 1990 – A New Decade (1990)	Volume III Just Right (1992)	Volume IV The Classic Singles 88–93 (1993)

Singles from Volume III: Just Right
- 1. "Joy" Released: 23 March 1992; 2. "Move Me No Mountain" Released: 1 June 1992; 3. "Just Right" Released: 14 September 1992

Volume III Just Right is the third album by the English music collective Soul II Soul, released in April 1992 through Ten and Virgin Records. Its first single was "Joy".

The album peaked at No. 3 on the UK Albums Chart and No. 88 on the Billboard 200. "Mood" was nominated for the Grammy Award for Best R&B Instrumental Performance.

== Production ==
The album was produced by Jazzie B, who also rapped on three of the tracks. Jazzie used several male vocalists on the album, including Richie Stephens.

Gary Barnacle played flute on Just Right; Snake Davis played saxophone. Caron Wheeler sang on "Take Me Higher". "Move Me No Mountain" is a cover of the song made famous by Love Unlimited.

== Critical reception ==
Professional ratings
Review scores
Source	Rating
Calgary Herald	A
Robert Christgau	(dud)
The Encyclopedia of Popular Music	3/5 stars
Entertainment Weekly	C+
The Indianapolis Star	3/4 stars
Los Angeles Times	3/4 stars
(The New) Rolling Stone Album Guide	3/5 stars
USA Today	2.5/4 stars
The Virginian-Pilot	2/4 stars

Entertainment Weekly wrote that "Jazzie has returned to the low-key feel of his first album with little deviation, except that he has turned to male singers, instead of his usual stable of divas, to revive his by-now-stale formula." Trouser Press lamented that the collective had "devolved from a groundbreaking, if creatively unreliable, soul collective to a not particularly exciting R&B act." The Gazette considered the album "background music at best," writing that "this is when groovy becomes generic."

Rolling Stone noted that "the Seventies-obsessed string arrangements on Just Right are piquant and precise." The Indianapolis Star stated that "Jazzie B. and his 'sound system' turn in a confident, entertaining and well-plotted blend of R&B, jazz, African and dance influences." The Calgary Herald praised the "rich vocals, big fat beats, choral interludes, soul grooves and African wind instrumentals." The Virginian-Pilot called the album "sluggish buppie pop with some vaguely hip elements grafted on," writing that it "offers little but a desperate pandering to the Quiet Storm."

== Track listing ==
Volume III Just Right track listing
No.	Title	Length
1.	"Joy"	4:31
2.	"Take Me Higher"	4:49
3.	"Storm"	3:36
4.	"Direction"	3:47
5.	"Just Right"	3:00
6.	"Move Me No Mountain"	4:40
7.	"Intelligence"	5:17
8.	"Future"	4:35
9.	"Mood"	3:48
10.	"Everywhere"	3:51
Total length:		41:54

== Charts ==
Chart performance for Volume III Just Right
Chart (1992)	Peak position
Australian Albums (ARIA)	17
Austrian Albums (Ö3 Austria)	24
Dutch Albums (Album Top 100)	25
German Albums (Offizielle Top 100)	29
New Zealand Albums (RMNZ)	13
Swedish Albums (Sverigetopplistan)	33
Swiss Albums (Schweizer Hitparade)	19
UK Albums (Official Charts)	3
US Billboard 200	88
US Top R&B/Hip-Hop Albums (Billboard)	33
