= Club Classics Vol. One =

Studio album by Soul II Soul
- Released: 10 April 1989
- Recorded: 1988–1989
- Studios: Addis Ababa (London); Lillie Yard (London); Britannia Row (London)
- Genre: R&B
- Length: 44:54
- Label: Virgin
- Producers: Jazzie B; Nellee Hooper

Soul II Soul chronology
Club Classics Vol. One (1989)	Vol. II: 1990 – A New Decade (1990)

Singles from Club Classics Vol. One
- 1. "Keep On Movin'" Released: 6 March 1989; 2. "Back to Life (However Do You Want Me)" Released: 30 May 1989

Club Classics Vol. One (released as Keep On Movin' in North America) is the debut studio album by British musical collective Soul II Soul. It was released on 10 April 1989 through Virgin Records. The album featured the group's hit singles "Keep On Movin'" and "Back to Life (However Do You Want Me)", the latter of which was a UK number-one hit and the fifth best-selling single in the UK that year. The album also reached number one and was certified triple platinum by the British Phonographic Industry for sales in excess of 900,000 copies.

In the United States, the album reached the Top 20 and was certified double platinum by the Recording Industry Association of America for sales in excess of two million copies. The single "Back to Life" was also a Top 10 hit in the US and was certified platinum. It found stronger success with R&B music listeners in the US, as the album went to No. 1 on the Top R&B Albums chart, and the title track and "Back to Life" were number-one R&B hit singles.

== Critical reception ==
Professional ratings
Review scores
Source	Rating
AllMusic	4.5/5 stars
Chicago Tribune	4/4 stars
Los Angeles Times	4/5 stars
Muzik	5/5 stars
NME	8/10
Record Mirror	5/5
Rolling Stone	4.5/5 stars
The Rolling Stone Album Guide	4/5 stars
Spin Alternative Record Guide	7/10
The Village Voice	B+

The Sunday Times noted that "there are traces of dubbed reggae, jazz flute, orchestral strings and Zulu harmonies here, as well as the more obvious delights of Caron Wheeler's gospel-soul vocals and the metronomic itch of the percussion loops."

Record Mirror's Tim Jeffery called the album "a beautifully pure statement of underground soul" and stated that by "embracing elements of hip hop, reggae, soul and African, Soul II Soul have created a distinctively British sound that reflects the experience and cosmopolitan urban culture of anew generation of black youth."

Alex Henderson, in a retrospective review for AllMusic, commented that the musical influences ranged from "Chic to hip hop to African music", and that the album was "among the most rewarding R&B releases of 1989."

== Legacy ==
In 2004 Q placed Club Classics Vol. One at number 28 in its list of the 50 Greatest British Albums Ever. In 2006, the magazine placed the album at number 34 in its list of "40 Best Albums of the 1980s". In 2012, Slant Magazine placed the album at number 100 on its list of the best albums of the 1980s. In 2024, Uncut included "Club Classics Vol. One" in their list of "The 500 Greatest Albums of the 1980s".

In late April 2021 Sky Arts included the album in episode two of its newly released Classic Albums series. The hour long broadcast featured newly released interviews with the band members and friends including Trevor Nelson.

== Track listing ==
No.	Title	Writer(s)	Length
1.	"Keep On Movin'" (featuring Caron Wheeler)	Trevor Beresford Romeo	6:00
2.	"Fairplay" (featuring Rose Windross)	Romeo, Nellee Hooper, Rose Windross	5:55
3.	"Holdin' On"	Romeo, Simon Law	4:13
4.	"Feeling Free" (Live Rap)	Romeo	4:13
5.	"African Dance"	Romeo, Law	6:00
6.	"Dance"	Romeo, Law	3:40
7.	"Feel Free" (featuring Do'reen)	Romeo, Hooper	5:00
8.	"Happiness" (featuring Do'reen)	Romeo, Hooper	5:30
9.	"Back to Life" (Accapella) (featuring Caron Wheeler)	Romeo	3:12
10.	"Jazzie's Groove"	Romeo, Hooper	3:12

10th Anniversary edition bonus tracks
No.	Title	Writer(s)	Length
11.	"Ambition" (Rap)	Romeo	3:49
12.	"Keep On Movin'" (Big Beat Accapella)	Romeo	3:36
13.	"Back to Life (However Do You Want Me)"	Romeo, Wheeler, Law, Hooper	3:52
14.	"Jazzie's Groove" (Piano Version)	Romeo, Hooper	4:04
15.	"Back to Life (However Do You Want Me)" (One World Remix)	Romeo, Wheeler, Law, Hooper	6:34
16.	"Keep On Movin'" (M Beat Bonus Mix)	Romeo	4:23

== Charts ==
=== Weekly charts ===
Chart (1989)	Peak position
Australian Albums (ARIA)	38
Austrian Albums (Ö3 Austria)	11
Dutch Albums (Album Top 100)	16
German Albums (Offizielle Top 100)	13
New Zealand Albums (RMNZ)	8
Swedish Albums (Sverigetopplistan)	8
Swiss Albums (Schweizer Hitparade)	12
UK Albums (Official Charts)	1
US Billboard 200 Keep On Movin'	14
US Top R&B/Hip-Hop Albums (Billboard) Keep On Movin'	1

=== Year-end charts ===
Chart (1989)	Position
Dutch Albums (Album Top 100)	43
German Albums (Offizielle Top 100)	57
New Zealand Albums (RMNZ)	44
US Billboard 200 Keep On Movin'	62
US Top R&B/Hip-Hop Albums (Billboard) Keep On Movin'	27

Chart (1990)	Position
New Zealand Albums (RMNZ)	49

== Certifications ==
Region	Certification	Certified units/sales
Canada (Music Canada)	Platinum	100,000^{^}
Netherlands (NVPI)	Gold	50,000^{^}
New Zealand (RMNZ)	Gold	7,500^{^}
United Kingdom (BPI)	3× Platinum	900,000^{^}
United States (RIAA)	2× Platinum	2,000,000^{^}
^{^} Shipments figures based on certification alone.

== See also ==
- List of UK Albums Chart number ones of the 1980s
- List of Billboard number-one R&B albums of 1989
