= Tom Stephan =

American house music producer and DJ

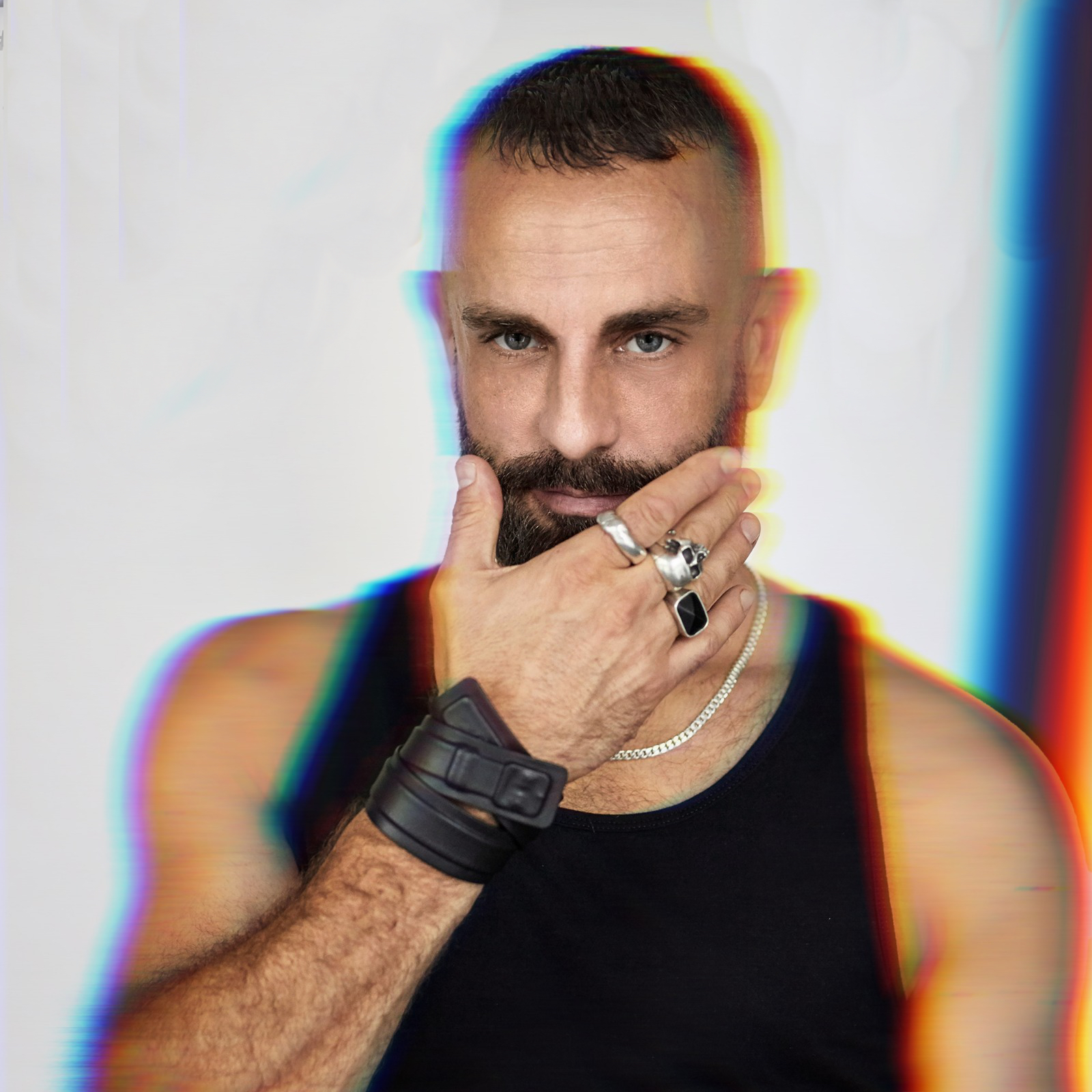

Background information
- Born: June 6, 1970 (age 56); Olean, New York, U.S.
- Genres: House
- Occupations: Disc jockey, record producer
- Years active: 1994–present
- Website: tomstephan.com

Tom Stephan (born June 6, 1970) is an American house music, producer, DJ and film director. He was born in New York, United States. He is also known as Superchumbo.

== Biography ==
In 1990, Stephan relocated to London, England and studied film at the London Film School where he directed 21st Century Nuns. The short documentary featured an interview by British artist, film-maker and AIDS activist Derek Jarman.

== Discography ==
=== Original productions ===
- Bart Skils ft Superchumbo - All Over My Body [Drumcode DC246] 2021
- David Tort & Tom Stephan - Music’s In Me [HoTL Records] 2017
- Tom Stephan & Danny Verde ft Rowetta - Feel It [Get Down] 2016
- Superchumbo & D. Ramirez - Shake It Baby [Slave Recordings] 2005
- Superchumbo - Wowie Zowie Album [Twisted America] 2005
- Superchumbo featuring Celeda - Dirtyfilthy [Twisted America] 2004
- Superchumbo - This Beat Is [Twisted America] 2003
- Superchumbo feat. Sylvia Mason-James - Irresistible! [Twisted America] 2002
- Superchumbo & Victoria Wilson-James - The Revolution [Twisted America] 2001
- Tracy & Sharon - Terrific / Filthy Hetero [Flesh UK/Omnisonus FR] 1994

=== Remixes ===
- Sting - If You Love Somebody Set Them Free (Tom Stephan Mix) [A&M] 2019
- Lenny Kravitz - Low (Tom Stephan Mix) [BMG] 2018
- Beyonce - Partition (Tom Stephan Mix) [Columbia] 2014
- Seductive - Take Control (Tom Stephan Mix) [Spinnin] 2010
- Oscar G. - What You Need (Tom Stephan Mix) [Nervous] 2010
- Fierce Ruling Diva - You Gotta Believe (Superchumbo mixes) [React /Tommy Boy] 2002
- Basement Jaxx - Get Me Off (Superchumbo 'Supergetoff' Remix) [XL] 2002
- Missy Elliott - Get Ur Freak On (Superchumbo's Superfreakon Remix) [Elektra] 2002
- Kylie Minogue - Can't Get You Out Of My Head (Superchumbo Mixes) [Parlophone] 2001
- Tina Turner - When The Heartache Is Over (Superchumbo's Crystal Mix) [DMC] 2000
- Pet Shop Boys - New York City Boy (Superchumbo Remixes) [EMI] 1999

=== DJ mix albums ===
- Nervous Nitelife [Nervous Records] 2009
- Asseteria - Live from NYC [Nervous Records] 2008
- Let’s Go Chumbo [ChumboMundo] 2006
- Roger Sanchez / Tom Stephan - Afterdark Vol.1 [Stealth] 2005
- Nite:Life 018 - These Beats Are... [NRK] 2004
- Superchumbo - Get the Lead Out! [Twisted] 2002
- Superchumbo - Leadhead [Loaded] 2002
- Soundworx - Session Two [Soundworx UK] 2001
- Drag Addict [Hut Recordings] 1996
- Just a Drag…Queen [Omnisonus FR] 1995

=== Productions ===
- Kevin Aviance - Join In The Chant [Wave] 1999

=== Co-productions ===
- Robbie Williams - There Are Bad Times Just Around The Corner [KALA] 1999

=== Performer ===
- Rufus Wainwright – Tiergarten (additional programming) [Geffen] 2007
- Pet Shop Boys - Integral (additional vocals) [Parlophone] 2007
- Pet Shop Boys - Screaming (additional keyboards) Psycho Motion Picture Soundtrack [Geffen] 1998

=== Number one US Billboard Dance singles ===
- Sting - "If You Love Somebody Set Them Free" 2019
- Lenny Kravitz - "Low" 2018
- HiFi Sean ft Crystal Waters - "Testify" 2017
- Yoko Ono - "Hell in Paradise" 2016
- Robin S & DJ Escape - "Shout it Out Loud" 2016
- Beyonce - "Partition" 2014
- Beyonce - "Pretty Hurts" 2014
- Ono - "Angel" 2014
- Ono - "Walking on Thin Ice" 2013
- Shakira – "Did It Again" 2010
- Kristine W - "Be Alright" 2009
- Africanism - "Hard" 2006
- Superchumbo - "Dirtyfilthy" 2004
- Seal - "Get it Together" 2003
- Superchumbo - "This Beat Is" 2003
- Murk - "Believe" 2003
- Kylie - "Can't Get You Out of My Head" 2002
- Fierce Ruling Diva - "You Gotta Believe" 2002
- Superchumbo - "Irresistible" 2002
- Pet Shop Boys - "NYC Boy" 1999
