= Daddae =

English musician (1964–2024)

Philip Harvey (28 February 1964 – 10 September 2024), known as Daddae Harvey or only Daddae, was a British guitarist, percussionist, keyboardist and composer formerly with The Funki Dreds, who later became Soul II Soul. He was one of the founding members of the group and co-wrote some of the tracks on their albums. They had a No. 1 UK hit with "Back to Life (However Do You Want Me)".

Of Daddae Harvey’s work with Soul II Soul, Music & Media wrote that the sounds were "cool… and supremely self-assured," whilst People Magazine wrote of the "drums, congas and bass ( that ) underpins delicate instrumentation and the combined vocals of Jazzy B. rapping and Marcia Lewis and Daddae Harvey singing,"whilst Spin observed that "Soul II Soul's harmony works because it is part of a movement defined in adversity to racism ( and ) materialism."

In 1997, Daddae teamed up with Joey "Words, Sounds & Power" Jay ( of Great Tribulation sound ) and Norman Jay to produce the roots reggae dub reggae album I n I Deal With Roots on High On Hope-Good Times record label, under the collective appellation, The Truth, which was successful with Jah Shaka followers. The album reworked drum and bass structures and production techniques from King Tubby, Prince Alla ( Great Stone ), Hugh Mundell ( Run Revolution A Come ), Yabby You, Count Ossie and The Mystic Revelation of Rastafari, ( Brother Samuel Clayton's poem on Respected Man ), Big Youth's iconic Screaming Target album, as well as sampling the bass line from Brent Dowe and The Palmer Brothers Step it Out of Babylon. The record also features conscious mic-chanting from Mama Ashaki, roots reggae artist, poet, and selector known for her performances in the UK reggae and dub poetry scene, Ras Kafency and Afrikan Simba.

Harvey was born in London, England on 28 February 1964, and died on 10 September 2024, at the age of 60.
