= Missing You (Soul II Soul song) =

1990 single by Soul II Soul

Single by Soul II Soul featuring Kym Mazelle

from the album Vol. II: 1990 – A New Decade
- Released: 12 November 1990
- Genre: R&B; house
- Length: 4:53
- Label: 10
- Songwriters: Jazzie B; Kym Mazelle; Simon Law
- Producers: Jazzie B; Nellee Hooper

Soul II Soul singles chronology
"People" (1990)	"Missing You" (1990)	"Joy" (1992)

Music video
- "Missing You" on YouTube

"Missing You" is a song by British R&B band Soul II Soul, released in November 1990 by 10 Records as the fourth and last single from their second album, Vol. II: 1990 – A New Decade (1990). It features American singer-songwriter Kym Mazelle on lead vocals and Lamya on background vocals. Mazelle co-wrote the lyrics with Jazzie B and Simon Law and the song was produced by Jazzie B and Nellee Hooper. It became a top-20 hit in Luxembourg and a top-30 hit in Ireland and the UK. Outside Europe, it peaked at number nine in Zimbabwe, number 39 on the US Billboard Dance Club Play chart and number 166 in Australia. The accompanying music video was shot in black-and-white, depicting Mazelle and Jazzie B dancing together on a dancefloor.

== Critical reception ==
Alex Henderson from AllMusic described "Missing You" as a "sleek urban/dance/neo-soul groove". Bill Coleman from Billboard magazine named it one of the "special moments" from the album. Another Billboard editor, Larry Flick, found that it places guest diva Kym Mazelle within a down-tempo R&B/house groove, saying, "A tad slow for peak-hour play, but just perfect for early-a.m. sets." Ernest Hardy from Cashbox complimented the chorus of the song. Pan-European magazine Music & Media felt it's "somewhat similar" to their 1989 hit "Keep On Movin'", noting further that this is "another strong contender from the masters of club music."

Selina Webb from Music Week called it "a safe bet", complimenting Mazelle's "strident soul vocal and loads of sophisticated groove techniques." She added that "this will chart highly". Paolo Hewitt from NME remarked that "House chanteuse" Kym Mazelle "hits the highs" on the track. A reviewer from People Magazine named it one of the "winners" of the album, on which Mazelle "gets to belt it out". Tom Doyle from Smash Hits described it as an "ace tune", that sounds "a bit" like "Keep On Movin'". He concluded that it "definitely deserves to be a single".

== Track listings ==
- 12-inch single (Remix), UK and Europe (1990)
1. "Missing You" (Remake) – 6:36
2. "Missing You" (Blow Mr Hornsman Blow Mix) – 6:34
3. "Missing You" (Thumpin' Bass Mix) – 5:32
- CD single, UK (1990)
1. "Missing You" (The Healer Mix) – 4:53
2. "Missing You" (The Thumpin' Bass Mix) – 4:48
3. "Missing You" (Album Version) – 5:24
4. "People" (Club Mix) – 4:51
- CD maxi, Japan (1991)
1. "Missing You" (Thumpin' Bass Mix) – 4:47
2. "Missing You" (The Healer Instrumental) – 5:04
3. "Missing You" (Humanity Mix) – 5:09
4. "Jazzie's Groove" (Jazzie's 12") – 5:05

== Charts ==
=== Weekly charts ===
Chart (1990)	Peak position
Australia (ARIA)	166
Ireland (IRMA)	24
Luxembourg (Radio Luxembourg)	19
Netherlands (Single Top 100)	74
UK Singles (OCC)	22
UK Airplay (Music Week)	11
US Dance Club Play (Billboard)	39
US Hot R&B Singles (Billboard)	29
Zimbabwe (ZIMA)	9

=== Year-end charts ===
Chart (1990)	Position
UK Club Chart (Record Mirror)	36

== Release history ==
Region	Date	Format(s)	Label(s)	Ref.
United Kingdom	12 November 1990	7-inch vinyl; 12-inch vinyl; CD; cassette	10	
Australia	19 November 1990	7-inch vinyl; 12-inch vinyl; CD; cassette	10; Virgin	
Japan	21 January 1991	CD	10; Virgin	
