= People (Soul II Soul song) =

Single by Soul II Soul featuring Marcia Lewis

from the album Vol. II: 1990 – A New Decade
- Released: 1990
- Genre: Downtempo; funk; soul
- Length: 3:50
- Label: Virgin
- Songwriters: Beresford "Jazzie B" Romeo; Hayden Maclaren Browne
- Producers: Nellee Hooper; Beresford "Jazzie B" Romeo

Soul II Soul singles chronology
"A Dreams a Dream" (1990)	"People" (1990)	"Missing You" (1990)

Music video
- "People" on YouTube

"People" is a song by British R&B band Soul II Soul, released in 1990 as the third single from their second album, Vol. II: 1990 – A New Decade (1990). It features singer Marcia Lewis, who had performed on their previous single, "Get a Life". The song was a notable hit, peaking at number ten in Italy, number 16 in the Netherlands and number 46 in Germany. It is one of the few songs by the band not to chart in the UK. It reached number three on the Billboard Hot Dance Club Play chart in the US.

== Critical reception ==
Greg Sandow from Entertainment Weekly remarked that the band "sometimes [are] in a more lighthearted mood", as on the song, "where, to the pulse of a house-music beat, comments on crowds passing in the street evoke a vision of the humanity all of us share." Paolo Hewitt from NME said, "It is only on "People", with its trite melody and even triter lyrics that the group show a rare lack of quality control". Nathaniel Wice from Spin felt the best hooks come in "People", "an interpretation of urban life in the Soul II Soul style—bright, lively and melodic."

== Track listing ==
- 7", UK (1990)
1. "People" – 3:50
2. "Feelin' Free" – 4:14
- 12", UK & Europe (1990)
1. "People" (12" Mix) – 5:35
2. "People" (Alternate # 2) – 9:25
- CD single, UK & Europe (1990)
1. "People" (7" Mix) – 3:50
2. "People" (12" Mix) – 5:35
3. "People" (Alternate #2) – 9:25
- CD maxi, Europe (1990)
1. "People" (7" Mix) – 3:50
2. "People" (LP Version) – 4:55
3. "People" (12" Mix) – 5:35
4. "People" (Alternate #1) – 5:26
5. "People" (Acappella) – 4:56

== Charts ==
Chart performance for "People"
Chart (1990)	Peak position
Australia (ARIA)	90
Europe (Eurochart Hot 100)	97
Finland (Suomen virallinen lista)	12
Germany (Official German Charts)	46
Italy (Musica e dischi)	10
Netherlands (Dutch Top 40)	16
Netherlands (Single Top 100)	17
New Zealand (Recorded Music NZ)	49
US Hot Dance Club Play (Billboard)	3
US Hot R&B/Hip-Hop Songs (Billboard)	44
