= Victoria Wilson-James =

American-born English singer-songwriter

- Also known as: The Glamazon
- Born: Gary, Indiana, United States
- Genres: House; pop; dance; electronic
- Occupations: Singer, songwriter, record producer
- Years active: 1987–present
- Labels: Epic, Sony, Virgin
- Formerly of: The Shamen, Soul II Soul, Avitas
- Website: victoriawilsonjames.com

Victoria Wilson-James is an American-born English singer, songwriter and record producer. Born and raised in Gary, Indiana, she performed in various theatre plays and musicals as a teenager. Following the release of her debut single "I Want You in My Movie", she was recruited by Jazzie B to join a newly reformed line-up of R&B group Soul II Soul. Managed by her bandmate, Jazzie B, the group became one of London's best-selling groups of all time. Their second album, Vol. II: 1990 – A New Decade (1990), which achieved gold-status in the US and UK, featured the top-charting single "A Dreams a Dream" with Wilson-James on lead vocals.

Following her exit from the group at the end of 1990, she released her debut solo album, Perseverance (1991), which contained hits "Through" and "Bright Lights". In 1993, she joined the Shamen and continued performing and recording with them until their disbandment in 1999. In 1997, she released her second album Colorfields, which featured one of her signature hits "Reach 4 the Melody". Wilson-James has also appeared in various theatre musicals including The Wiz (2001), Purlie (2004), and Lush Life (2005). She formed a duo called Avitas and released an album titled A Course in Miracles in September 2005.

In June 2012, Soul II Soul received the honorary Heritage Award from Performing Right Society, which Wilson-James also received despite not being able to attend. In March 2013, she released her third album titled The Rapture.

== Early life ==
Wilson-James attended the Los Angeles Academy of Performing Arts, where she graduated with a degree in Theatre Arts. She also attended Phil Moore's Singers Workshop in Hollywood.

== Career ==
In 1988, she released her first single "I Want You in My Movie" on Risin' Records. In 1990, Jazzie B recruited Wilson-James to join British music group Soul II Soul after the departure of their previous members. In May 1990, Soul II Soul released the second single "A Dreams a Dream", which featured Wilson-James on lead vocals; from their album Vol. II: 1990 – A New Decade. The song peaked in the top-ten of the UK Singles Chart. In the same month, Soul II Soul released their second album Vol. II: 1990 – A New Decade, which peaked at number one on the UK Albums Chart. The album also became certified gold-status in the United Kingdom. Wilson-James also toured with the group in the summer of 1990. One of their concerts was recorded at Brixton Academy and released in September 1990 titled A New Decade: Live from Brixton Academy. Following the conclusion of the tour, she left to pursue a solo career.

In late 1990, she began recording her first album, which would be produced by fellow Soul II Soul member Jazzie B and composer and musical director Michael J McEvoy. On March 26, 1991, she released her first album Perseverance, which peaked at number 55 on Billboard's R&B Albums chart. In March 1991, the album's lead single "Through" was released and peaked at number 22 on Billboard's Hot R&B/Hip-Hop Songs chart. She also promoted the album by performing on various musical variety shows including The Party Machine with Nia Peeples, Soul Train, The Word, and Video Soul. In July 1991, she released the second single "Bright Lights", which peaked at number 83 on the R&B Songs chart. The album's final single "One World" was released in late 1991.

In 1993, she became the front woman for techno-pop band the Shamen. In 1995, they released their first album together called Axis Mutatis, which peaked at number 27 on the UK Albums Chart. The album spawned the singles "Destination Eschaton" and "Transamazonia", which peaked in the top-thirty of the UK Singles Chart. The final single "Heal (The Separation)" peaked at number 31 on the UK Singles Chart.

In 1997, Wilson-James released a single titled "Reach 4 the Melody". Her second album Colorfields was released in 1997 on the Dance Pool recording label. In 1998, she re-joined the Shamen for their final album titled UV. Their last single "Universal" was released before their amicable split in 1999. In 1999, she returned to musical theatre and played Roxy, a role created for her, in the UK musical Oh What a Night!. In 2001, she played the role of "Glinda", the good witch of the South, in the UK production of The Wiz.

In 2001, she appeared on Superchumbo's single "The Revolution", which peaked at number 43 on the Dance Club Songs chart. The song also peaked at number 37 on the Hot Dance Maxi-Singles Sales chart. In 2002, she was featured on Mr. C's single "Circles of Love" from his debut album Change. In 2004, Wilson-James starred as "Greta" in the film Road to Damascus, directed by Chris Munro. In the same year, she played the role of "Missy Judson" in the musical Purlie.

In early 2005, Wilson-James starred in the theatre musical Lush Life, where she play the role of Ella Fitzgerald and the Cop. Again, her performance garnered excellent reviews. In June 2005, she collaborated with Ralph Falcon on the song "Swim" for the compilation album Café Mambo Ibiza 2005. In 2005, Wilson-James created a musical duo called Avitas, with musician Kinan Atassi. As Avitas, they released an album called A Course in Miracles in September 2005. The album featured the singles "Re-Creation" and "Cantate".

In March 2007, she released a two-disc compilation album titled Indestructible, which spawned the single "Yo' Freek". She was also featured on Ralph Falcon's single "I Need Someone", which peaked at number two on the U.S. Dance chart after spending twenty-six weeks on the chart.

In June 2013, she released her third album The Rapture. The album spawned the singles "Never Stop", "Deep in Vogue", "Say It Ain't So", and "Red Lipstick". In November 2016, Wilson-James starred in her one-woman show called "Perseverance".

In November 2017, Wilson-James released a single titled "Pray". The song is part of "P.R.A.Y. (Project Resonance Ascension Yantra)" and was released as a free download on her SoundCloud page.

== Discography ==
=== Studio albums ===
Title	Album details	Peak chart positions	
Title	Album details	US R&B /HH	UK Dance
Perseverance	Released: March 26, 1991; Label: Epic	55	3
Colorfields	Released: 1997; Label: Dance Pool, Sony Germany	—	—
The Rapture	Released: June 13, 2013; Label: Victoria Wilson James Music	—	—

=== Compilation albums ===
Title	Album details
Indestructible	Released: March 26, 2007; Label: Thirteen Records

=== Singles ===
List of singles as lead artist, with selected chart positions and certifications, showing year released and album name
Title	Year	Peak chart positions				Album
Title	Year	US R&B /HH	SCO Dance	UK	UK Dance	Album
"I Want You in My Movie"	1988	—	14	—	—	Non-album single
"Through"	1991	22	—	77	11	Perseverance
"Bright Lights"	1991	83	—	—	—	Perseverance
"One World"	1991	—	—	—	—	Perseverance
"Transcendental Rhythm"	1993	—	—	—	—	Non-album single
"Boogie Wonderland"	1993	—	—	—	—	Non-album single
"Reach 4 the Melody"	1997	—	—	72	—	Colorfields
"Find the Child"	1997	—	—	—	—	Colorfields
"Fandango"	2000	—	—	—	—	Non-album single
"Dare to Dream"	2004	—	—	—	—	Indestructible
"Yo' Freek"	2007	—	—	—	—	Indestructible
"Never Stop"	2009	—	—	—	—	The Rapture
"Red Lipstick"	2012	—	—	—	—	The Rapture
"Increase the Pressure"	2012	—	—	—	—	The Rapture
"Deep in Vogue"	2012	—	—	—	—	The Rapture
"Say It Ain't So"	2013	—	—	—	—	The Rapture
"—" denotes a recording that did not chart or was not released in that territory.

List of singles as a featured artist, with selected chart positions and certifications, showing year released and album name
Title	Year	Peak chart positions				Album
Title	Year	US	US Dance	EU	UK	Album
"A Dreams a Dream" (Soul II Soul featuring Victoria Wilson-James)	1990	85	3	13	6	Vol. II: 1990 – A New Decade
"The Revolution" (Superchumbo featuring Victoria Wilson-James)	2001	—	43	— (Note: "The Revolution" did not enter the Eurochart Hot 100, but peaked at number 21 on the Music & Media European Dance Traxx chart.)	— (Note: "The Revolution" did not enter the UK Singles Chart, but peaked at number 1 on the Music Week UK Cool Cuts Chart and number 10 on the UK Club Chart Top 40.)	Non-album single
"Circles of Love" (Mr. C featuring Victoria Wilson-James)	2002	—	—	—	—	Change
"I Need Someone" (Ralph Falcon featuring Victoria Wilson-James)	2007	—	2	—	—	Non-album single
"Control" (Ralph Falcon featuring Victoria Wilson-James)	2009	—	—	—	—	Non-album single
"Alien" (House of Wallenberg featuring Victoria Wilson-James)	2016	—	—	—	—	Non-album single
"—" denotes a recording that did not chart or was not released in that territory.

== Filmography ==
List of acting performances in film
Year	Title	Role	Notes
2004	Road to Damascus	Greta	Lead role

List of acting performances in theatre
Year	Title	Role	Notes
1999	Oh What a Night!	Roxy	Lead role
2001	The Wiz	Glinda	Supporting role
2004	Purlie	Missy Judson	Lead role
2005	Lush Life	Ella Fitzgerald, the Cop	Lead role
