= Move Me No Mountain =

1974 single by Love Unlimited

"Move Me No Mountain" is a song written by American songwriters Jerry Ragovoy and Aaron Schroeder. It was originally recorded in 1974 by Love Unlimited, a group organized and produced by Barry White. In 1975, Ragovoy arranged and produced a recording of the song by American singer Dionne Warwick. Warwick's version used a slightly different melody in the song's chorus than the melody sung by Love Unlimited, and this variation has been used on subsequent recordings of the song. In 1980, American singer Chaka Khan recorded a version of the song with production by Arif Mardin.

== Soul II Soul version ==
"Move Me No Mountain"

Single by Soul II Soul featuring Kofi

from the album Volume III Just Right
- Released: June 1, 1992
- Genre: Dance-pop; soul; gospel; house
- Length: 3:25
- Label: 10
- Songwriters: Jerry Ragovoy; Aaron Schroeder
- Producer: Jazzie B

Soul II Soul singles chronology
"Joy" (1992)	"Move Me No Mountain" (1992)	"Just Right" (1992)

Music video
- "Move Me No Mountain" on YouTube

"Move Me No Mountain" was covered by British musical collective Soul II Soul and released in June 1992 by 10 Records as the second single from their third album, Volume III Just Right (1992). It was produced by Jazzie B and features British singer Kofi (Carol Simms) on lead vocals and American singer Penny Ford on background vocals. The song was a top-10 hit in Greece and Portugal, peaking at number seven and ten, respectively. In the UK, it reached number 31 on the UK Singles Chart and number six on the Music Week Dance Singles chart. Outside Europe, it peaked at number 29 on the US Billboard Dance Club Play chart and was a top-40 hit in New Zealand. The accompanying black-and-white music video features Kofi performing behind and in front of a waterfall.

=== Critical reception ===
Larry Flick from Billboard magazine complimented the "silky tones" of new vocalist Kofi, that empowers the song, "a hearty mix of the act's signature nouveau soul and state-of-the-charts house beats." John Martinucci from the Gavin Report declared it as a "laid back house-flavored track with Kofi's smooth vocals", adding that former Snap! member Penny Ford assists with the background vocals. The Stud Brothers of Melody Maker found it "all-too-slick" and the vocals delivered "sweetly but dispassionately". Andy Beevers from Music Week named it Pick of the Week in the category of Dance and a "standout" of the album. He also complimented the song as "an obvious choice" featuring "sweet soulful vocals".

Dele Fadele from New Musical Express wrote, "...you can still rely on them for well-tailored grooves and universal sentiments. With new discovery Kofi's warm, earthy voice jousting against a string arrangement, 'Move Me No Mountain' makes a case for long, languid summers and the resurrection of "Soul"." Orla Swift from Record-Journal described it as "gospel-inflected", naming it one of the album's "strongest cuts". Miranda Sawyer from Select felt it "skips along very nicely — sweet lovers' rock vocals (from reggae star Kofi) soaring over Soul II Soul's effortlessly clubby beat." Another Select editor, David Lubich, remarked that the song shows "a glimpse of vocal talent". Tom Doyle from Smash Hits was less enthustiastic, giving it two out of five.

=== Track listing ===
- 12-inch single, UK (1992)
1. "Move Me No Mountain" (Club Mix)
2. "Move Me No Mountain" (Hackney E9 Mix)
3. "Move Me No Mountain" (Dub)
4. "Move Me No Mountain" (Removed Club Mix)
5. "Move Me No Mountain" (Dum Dum Dub)
- CD single, UK (1992)
1. "Move Me No Mountain" (Album Edit) – 3:25
2. "Move Me No Mountain" (Club Mix) – 4:22
3. "Move Me No Mountain" (Radio Mix) – 2:56
4. "Move Me No Mountain" (Hackney E9 Mix) – 4:06
5. "Move Me No Mountain" (Dub) – 3:38
6. "Move Me No Mountain" (Removed Club Mix) – 6:23
7. "Move Me No Mountain" (Dum Dum Dub) – 5:18

=== Charts ===
==== Weekly charts ====
Weekly chart performance for "Move Me No Mountain"
Chart (1992)	Peak position
Australia (ARIA)	96
Europe (Eurochart Hot 100)	99
Europe (European Dance Radio)	2
Greece (Virgin)	7
Netherlands (Dutch Top 40 Tipparade)	13
Netherlands (Single Top 100)	62
New Zealand (Recorded Music NZ)	40
Portugal (AFP)	10
UK Singles (OCC)	31
UK Airplay (Music Week)	20
UK Dance (Music Week)	6
UK Club Chart (Music Week)	2
US Dance Club Play (Billboard)	29
US Hot R&B Singles (Billboard)	33

==== Year-end charts ====
Year-end chart performance for "Move Me No Mountain"
Chart (1992)	Position
UK Club Chart (Music Week)	77

=== Release history ===
Release dates and formats for "Move Me No Mountain"
Region	Date	Format(s)	Label(s)	Ref.
United Kingdom	June 1, 1992	7-inch vinyl; 12-inch vinyl; CD; cassette	10	
Australia	July 6, 1992	CD; cassette	10	
Japan	July 17, 1992	Mini-album	10; Virgin Japan	
