= Charlotte (singer) =

British singer-songwriter and producer

Charlotte Kelly
- Born: Charlotte Kelly; Coventry, England
- Genres: Dance; R&B; pop; rock; house; soul
- Occupations: Singer; songwriter; musician; record producer
- Instruments: Vocals; piano; keyboards; guitar
- Years active: 1990–present

Charlotte Kelly (born 1976) is a British singer-songwriter, composer, arranger, and record producer. Kelly rose to fame in the mid-1990s as one of the lead singers of British R&B group Soul II Soul, one of London's best-selling groups of all time. She performed lead vocals on their single "I Care" for their fourth studio album Volume V: Believe (1995). She continued to record and perform with the group until the release of their final studio album Time for Change (1997). During their hiatus, Kelly released her debut solo album Just Another Girl (1998), which sold exclusively in Japan. She released her second album Charlotte (1999), which included dance hit "Skin".

Kelly reunited with the group in 2010 for their Reunion Tour. Following the conclusion of the tour, Kelly continued to perform with the group as the lead singer. In 2013, she left the group to pursue her solo career.

Her work has earned her several awards and nominations, including three United Nations Music Aid Awards, a UK Songwriting Contest Award and Unisong International Song Award. Kelly has also received the Heritage Award from Performing Right Society along with the members of Soul II Soul.

== Early and personal life ==
Charlotte Kelly was born in Coventry, England, to Michelle Kelly and Tony Kelly in either 1976 or 1977. Her parents were the former owners of a record store named "Moonshine" in Lower Ford Street, Hillfields, Coventry. She also has a two sisters and a brother. Kelly was born blind at birth with no sight at all in her left eye and virtually none in her right eye. At a young age, Kelly knew she wanted become a singer after listening to the music being played in her parents' record store.

She has 2 children.

== Career ==
=== 1992–93: Beginnings ===
Kelly started her career as a singer at the age of sixteen when she signed her first record contract with Big Life Records. In 1993, Kelly released her first single titled "Sugar Tree". The music video debuted on ITV Chart Show in October 1993. In 1994, she released two singles titled "Climb My Stairs" and "All of Your Love". Later that year, she was introduced to Jazzie B (of Soul II Soul) who would produce her next single titled "Queen of Hearts". The song featured background vocals from Lamya (of Soul II Soul).

=== 1994–1997: Soul II Soul and career breakthrough ===
After releasing this demo, Kelly toured as a background singer for Soul II Soul. She was later asked to become a full-time member and one of the lead vocalist of the group. In August 1995, Soul II Soul released their fourth studio album, entitled "Volume V: Believe". The album charted at number 13 on the UK Albums chart. The album's second single "I Care", which features lead vocals by Kelly, peaked at number 17 on the UK Singles chart. Kelly also sings lead vocals on songs "Don't You Dream" and "Pride".

In 1997, Soul II Soul released their fifth studio album, entitled "Time for Change". Kelly performed lead vocals on the titled-track "Time for Change". Later that year, Kelly left Soul II Soul pursue her solo career. She signed a new recording contract with Parlophone Rhythm Series.

=== 1998–2000: Just Another Girl and Charlotte ===
In February 1998, Kelly released the single "Be Mine". The single charted at number 59 on the UK Singles chart. In November 1998, Charlotte released her first album Just Another Girl exclusive in Japan.

In February 1999, "Skin" was released as the lead single from her upcoming second album. The song peaked at number 1 on Billboard's Club Play chart and number 56 on the UK Singles chart, selling over 40,000 copies worldwide. In June 1999, the album's second single "Someday" peaked at number 74 on the UK Singles chart. Kelly's remix project "Remixed to Infinity" was also released exclusively to Japan. The album features a total of eight songs that were remixed from three original songs: "Skin", "Someday", and "Be Mine".

In September 1999, Kelly released her self-titled second studio album "Charlotte". The album's final single "Don't Be Afraid of the Dark" was released in 2000 and peaked at number 11 on Billboard's Dance chart.

=== 2002–2010: Songwriting competitions and music production ===
In 2002, Kelly released a song "Golden Gate (Lovin' You)", which was featured on the WMC Allstars compilation album. In 2004, Kelly participated in the USA Songwriting Competition. She entered up to four songs and won first prize in the R&B category for her song "Cheeky". In 2006, she participated in UK Songwriting Competition and won first prize in R&B category. She also entered in the Pop category where she received second place. In the same year, Kelly also entered in the Music Aid Awards where she received first place in two categories: "Best UK Female Artist" and "Best UK Songwriter".

In 2010 Charlotte co-wrote the topline to UK number 1 single "Good Times", performed by Roll Deep. This earned Charlotte her first UK number 1.

=== 2010–2013: Return to Soul II Soul ===
In 2010, the former members of Soul II Soul reunited for a reunion tour. Following the reunion tour, Kelly rejoined the group as the lead vocalist. The group performed the annual Rewind Festival in 2012. In June 2012, the members of Soul II Soul received the honorary PRS Heritage Plaque award. In November 2013, Kelly left the group again to focus on her solo career.

=== 2013–present: Solo career ===
In 2013, Kelly released a single titled "Somebody's Baby". In 2014, Kelly released three singles: "Tell the Sun", "All Coming Back", and "Sonic Sex".

== Discography ==
Albums

- Just Another Girl (1998)
- Remixed to Infinity (1999)
- Charlotte (1999)

Singles

Title	Year	Chart positions		Album
Title	Year	UK	US Dance	Album
"Sugar Tree"	1993	—	—	Non-album singles
"Climb My Stairs"	1994	—	—	Non-album singles
"All of Your Love"	1994	—	—	Non-album singles
"Queen of Hearts"	1994	54	—	Non-album singles
"It's Alright"	1994	—	—	Non-album singles
"I Care" (with Soul II Soul)	1995	17	—	Volume V: Believe
"Be Mine"	1998	59	—	Just Another Girl
"Skin"	1999	56	1	Charlotte
"Someday"	1999	74	4	Charlotte
"Don't Be Afraid of the Dark"	2000	—	11	Charlotte
"Breaking Me Apart" (featuring Sunship)	2012	—	—	Non-album single
"Somebody's Baby"	2013	—	—	Charlotte
"Tell the Sun" (with Sunship)	2014	—	—	Non-album singles
"All Coming Back"	2014	—	—	Non-album singles
"Sonic Sex"	2014	—	—	Non-album singles
"Love Shines" (Richard Wessex featuring Charlotte Kelly)	2016	—	—	Non-album singles
"Love on the Rox" (with Sunship)	2017	—	—	Missing in (East) Action

== Awards and nominations ==
=== USA Songwriting competition ===
Year	Nominee / work	Award	Result
2004	"Cheeky"	Best R&B Song	Won
2004	"Symphony"	Best R&B Song	Nominated
2004	"Raining in Heaven"	Best R&B Song	Nominated
2004	"Spook"	Best R&B Song	Nominated
2005	"I Need You That Way"	Best R&B Song	Nominated
2005	"Come On"	Best R&B Song	Nominated

=== UK Songwriting competition ===
Year	Nominee / work	Award	Result
2006	"I Need You That Way"	Best R&B, Hip-Hop, Rap Song	Won
2006	"Come On"	Best R&B, Hip-Hop, Rap Song	Nominated
2006	"Raining in Heaven"	Best Pop Song	Nominated
2006	"Better with You"	Best Pop Song	Nominated

=== United Nations Music Aid Awards ===
Year	Nominee / work	Award	Result
2006	Charlotte Kelly	Best UK Female Artist	Won
2006	Charlotte Kelly	Best UK Songwriter	Won
2009	Charlotte Kelly	Best Female Solo Artist	Won

=== Unisong International Song Contest ===
Year	Nominee / work	Award	Result
2007	"I Need You That Way"	Best R&B, Hip-Hop, Rap Song	Won
2007	"Symphony"	Best R&B, Hip-Hop, Rap Song	Nominated

== See also ==
- List of number-one dance hits (United States)
- List of artists who reached number one on the US Dance chart
