= Joy (Soul II Soul song) =

1992 single by Soul II Soul

Single by Soul II Soul featuring Richie Stephens

from the album Volume III Just Right
- Released: 23 March 1992
- Genre: Funk; R&B
- Length: 4:13
- Label: 10
- Songwriters: Jazzie B; Will Mowat
- Producer: Jazzie B

Soul II Soul singles chronology
"Missing You" (1990)	"Joy" (1992)	"Move Me No Mountain" (1992)

Music video
- "Joy" on YouTube

"Joy" is a song by British musical collective Soul II Soul, released on 23 March 1992 by 10 Records as the first single from their third album, Volume III Just Right (1992). The song, co-written and produced by Jazzie B, features Jamaican singer and producer Richie Stephens and was a hit in Europe. It peaked within the top-10 in Greece and the UK, and also became a top-20 hit in Ireland, Italy and the Netherlands. Outside Europe, it reached number four in Zimbabwe, number 18 in New Zealand, and number 41 in Australia.

== Critical reception ==
Larry Flick from Billboard magazine described the song as a "slinky funk/Contemporary R&B jam that is enlivened by jazz-spiced flutes and plush string fills. Though far from the act's best material, track is head-and-shoulders above typical urban and pop radio fodder." He added that remixes by Brand New Heavies "kick hard and should inspire club play". Andy Kastanas from The Charlotte Observer deemed it "a much more mainstream sound than ever before, this new track typifies their usual sound." Marisa Fox from Entertainment Weekly noted that "Jamaica's Richie Stephens breathes some steam" into the dance-hall-style "Joy".

James Hamilton from Music Week's RM Dance Update called it a "lurching jiggly" track, "throatily wailed by Richie Stephens through gospel-style girls hypnotically chorusing "joy, it's a new sensation, new vibration rockin' the nation"". Cary Darling from Orange County Register said that sung by Stephens and backed by a gospel choir, the song "recaptures the motion and emotion" of "Keep on Movin'". Orla Swift from Record-Journal viewed it as "soulful". Sylvia Patterson from Smash Hits named it the "jolliest tune" of the album.

== Track listings ==
- 12-inch single, US (1992)
1. "Joy" (New Vibrations mix) – 6:43
2. "Joy" (Spag 'N Joy dub) – 5:19
3. "Joy" (radio mix) – 4:12
4. "Joy" (12-inch club mix) – 5:49
5. "Joy" (BNH mix) – 5:10
6. "Joy" (GNL Peace version) – 5:19
- CD single, Europe (1992)
1. "Joy" (radio mix) – 4:13
2. "Joy" (Brand New Heavies remix) – 5:12
3. "Joy" (album mix) – 4:32
4. "Joy" (club mix) – 5:50
5. "Joy" (instrumental dub mix) – 3:49

== Charts ==
=== Weekly charts ===
Chart (1992)	Peak position
Australia (ARIA)	41
Belgium (Ultratop 50 Flanders)	24
Europe (Eurochart Hot 100)	11
Europe (European Dance Radio)	1
Germany (GfK)	21
Greece (Virgin)	3
Ireland (IRMA)	11
Israel (Israeli Singles Chart)	19
Italy (Musica e dischi)	12
Netherlands (Dutch Top 40)	15
Netherlands (Single Top 100)	19
New Zealand (Recorded Music NZ)	18
Sweden (Sverigetopplistan)	29
Switzerland (Schweizer Hitparade)	21
UK Singles (Official Charts)	4
UK Airplay (Music Week)	1
UK Dance (Music Week)	3
UK Club Chart (Music Week)	1
US Hot R&B Singles (Billboard)	14
US Maxi-Singles Sales (Billboard)	13
Zimbabwe (ZIMA)	4

=== Year-end charts ===
Chart (1992)	Position
Europe (European Dance Radio)	5
UK Singles (OCC)	94
UK Airplay (Music Week)	48
UK Club Chart (Music Week)	25

== Release history ==
Region	Date	Format(s)	Label(s)	Ref.
United Kingdom	23 March 1992	7-inch vinyl; 12-inch vinyl; CD; cassette	10	
Japan	1 April 1992	Mini-CD	10	
Australia	20 April 1992	12-inch vinyl; CD; cassette	10	
