= A Dreams a Dream =

1990 single by Soul II Soul

Single by Soul II Soul

from the album Vol. II: 1990 – A New Decade
- B-side: "Courtney Blows"
- Released: 23 April 1990
- Genre: Soul-jazz
- Length: 4:13 (single version); 5:38 (album version)
- Label: 10
- Songwriters: Jazzie B; Simon Law
- Producers: Jazzie B; Nellee Hooper

Soul II Soul singles chronology
"Get a Life" (1989)	"A Dreams a Dream" (1990)	"People" (1990)

Music video
- "A Dreams a Dream" on YouTube

"A Dreams a Dream" (no apostrophe in "Dreams" [sic]) is a song by British musical collective Soul II Soul, released in April 1990 by 10 Records as the second single from the collective's second album, Vol. II: 1990 – A New Decade (1990). The song features American-born British singer Victoria Wilson-James and received favorable reviews from music critics. It was written by Jazzie B and Simon Law, and produced by the first with Nellee Hooper. The song reached number one in Greece, number six on the UK Singles Chart and was a top-10 hit also in Finland, Italy, Luxembourg, the Netherlands and Norway.

== Critical reception ==
Alex Henderson from AllMusic described the song as "haunting". Bill Coleman from Billboard magazine named it one of the "special moments" from Vol. II: 1990 – A New Decade. He also called it a "seductive, sleaze-speed club track with house overtones [that] is (gratefully) less derivative of previous efforts. Vocals by Victoria Wilson-James excite." Ernest Hardy from Cash Box complimented its "operatic touch". Ian Gittins from Melody Maker wrote, "It's no 'Back to Life', never so entrancing or alluring, but still there's that loping, dance-compulsory beat which lets them get away with anything before Jazzie muzzles in to growl his hopeful, dreamy creed." David Giles from Music Week stated, "All the trademarks are there — shuffling rhythm, sweeping strings and wailing female vocals — and these should ensure another substantial hit for Jazzie B and his crew."

A reviewer from The Network Forty described it as "Jazzy B's soul-jazz-African-operatic single". Paolo Hewitt from NME remarked Wilson-James' "operatic technique". Davydd Chong from Record Mirror felt that only one track from the album, 'A Dreams a Dream', "warded off the bite of the critic, with a garland of garlic and a majestic arrangement." Tom Doyle from Smash Hits complimented the singer's voice as "marvellous". Adam Higginbotham from Select viewed the song as "insubstantial fluff". Steven Daly from Spin concluded, "'Dream' won't dictate this summer's tempo the way 'Movin'' did last year, but this gentle house sway will nonetheless build a little birdhouse in your soul. (In case you were concerned, yes, Jazzie manages to stop by for his usual lecture.)"

== Chart performance ==
"A Dreams a Dream" was successful on the charts in Europe, reaching number one in Greece and the top 10 in Finland, Italy, Luxembourg, the Netherlands, Norway and the UK. In the latter country, the song peaked at number six on the UK Singles Chart as well as number one on both the UK Dance Singles chart and the UK Club Chart. Additionally, it was a top-20 hit in Austria, Belgium, West Germany, Ireland, Sweden and Switzerland. On the Eurochart Hot 100, it reached number 13 in May 1990. Outside Europe, "A Dreams a Dream" peaked at number three on the US Billboard Dance Club Play chart, numbers eight and 27 in New Zealand and Australia, and number 12 in Israel.

== Track listings ==
- 7-inch, UK (1990)

A. "A Dreams a Dream" — 4:08
B. "A Dreams a Dream" (instrumental) — 4:08

- 12-inch, Greece (1990)

A1. "A Dreams a Dream" (A Night at the Opera mix) — 5:45
B1. "A Dreams a Dream" (club dub) — 4:25
B2. "Courtney Blows" — 4:32

- 12-inch vinyl, US (1990)

A1. "A Dreams a Dream" (A Night at the Opera mix) — 5:45
B1. "A Dreams a Dream" (club dub) — 4:25
B2. "Courtney Blows" — 4:32

- 12-inch single, Australia (1990)

A1. "Dreams a Dream" (A Night at the Opera mix)
B1. "Get a Life" (12-inch mix)
B2. "Back to Life" (12-inch mix club)

- CD single, UK (1990)
1. "A Dreams a Dream" — 4:13
2. "A Dreams a Dream" (A Night at the Opera mix) — 5:49
3. "A Dreams a Dream" (club dub) — 4:28
4. "Courtney Blows" — 4:33
- CD single, Europe (1990)
1. "A Dreams a Dream" — 4:13
2. "A Dreams a Dream" (A Night at the Opera mix) — 5:49
3. "A Dreams a Dream" (club dub) — 4:28
4. "Courtney Blows" — 4:33
- Cassette single, US (1990)
1. "A Dreams a Dream" (7-inch A)
2. "A Dreams a Dream" (7-inch B)

== Charts ==
=== Weekly charts ===
Chart (1990)	Peak position
Australia (ARIA)	27
Austria (Ö3 Austria Top 40)	16
Belgium (Ultratop 50 Flanders)	20
Europe (Eurochart Hot 100)	13
Finland (Suomen virallinen lista)	7
Ireland (IRMA)	12
Israel (Israeli Singles Chart)	12
Italy (Musica e dischi)	10
Luxembourg (Radio Luxembourg)	2
Netherlands (Dutch Top 40)	10
Netherlands (Single Top 100)	6
New Zealand (Recorded Music NZ)	8
Norway (VG-lista)	7
Sweden (Sverigetopplistan)	19
Switzerland (Schweizer Hitparade)	14
UK Singles (Official Charts)	6
UK Dance (Music Week)	1
UK Club Chart (Record Mirror)	1
US Billboard Hot 100	85
US 12-inch Singles Sales (Billboard) with "Courtney Blows"	1
US Dance Club Play (Billboard) with "Courtney Blows"	3
US Hot Black Singles (Billboard)	19
US Cash Box Top 100	81
West Germany (GfK)	15

=== Year-end charts ===
Chart (1990)	Position
Netherlands (Dutch Top 40)	78
Netherlands (Single Top 100)	80
UK Club Chart (Record Mirror)	10
US 12-inch Singles Sales (Billboard)	20
US Dance Club Play (Billboard)	44

== Release history ==
Region	Date	Format(s)	Label(s)	Ref.
United Kingdom	1990	7-inch vinyl; 12-inch vinyl; CD; cassette	10	
Australia	30 April 1990	7-inch vinyl; 12-inch vinyl; cassette	10	
Japan	6 June 1990	CD	10; Virgin	
