= Melissa Bell (singer) =

English singer (1964–2017)

- Born: Euphemia Imelda Ewen; 5 March 1964
- Origin: London, England
- Died: 28 August 2017 (aged 53)
- Genres: R&B; dance; soul
- Occupations: Singer; songwriter
- Instruments: Vocals; piano
- Years active: 1991–2017
- Label: Anditone Records

Melissa Bell (5 March 1964 – 28 August 2017) was an British singer. From 1993 to 1996, Bell was one of the lead singers of British R&B act Soul II Soul, with whom she released a single titled "Wish". She also created her own band called Soul Explosion, which started in 1999. Bell also worked with Liza Minnelli, Whitney Houston, and Stevie Wonder.

== Early life ==
Euphemia Imelda Ewen was born on 5 March 1964 in London. Her parents Ivy (née Dooley) and Ivan Ewen were born in Jamaica and immigrated to London on a Spanish ship called TN Begoña (ex-Vassar Victory), a famous WWII-era Victory ship converted into a popular migrant liner in the 1950s-70s for the Spanish Line. According to her autobiography Heart and Soul: The Emotional Autobiography of Melissa Bell, her mother was half Jamaican and half Irish and her father was half Jamaican and half Indian. She has three half siblings: Frances from her father's previous relationship, and Sonia and Danny from her mother's previous relationship. Bell was a graduate of Southwark College in the London Borough of Southwark. She worked in customer service for Marks and Spencer from 1982 until 1991.

== Career ==
In 1987, she was featured on Bobby E and the Midi City Crew's single "Walk on the Wild Side". In 1991, she appeared on the song "The Dancer" from the Bingoboys' album The Best of Bingoboys. She released her debut single "Reconsider" in 1992, which received major radio play. In the same year, she released another single titled "Crystal Clear".

In 1993, Bell joined British musical group Soul II Soul after Jazzie B heard her single "Reconsider" and asked her to join the group. She recorded a single called "Wish", which was released on their greatest hits album Volume IV The Classic Singles 88–93 in 1993. The single peaked at number 24 on the UK Singles Chart. Following the success of the song she was invited to perform it on Top of the Pops while heavily pregnant with her son,

She continued to record and tour with the group as one of their featured singers. In 1995, she performed lead vocals on the song "Be a Man" on their fourth studio album Volume V: Believe. In 1996, she departed from the group to continue her solo career.

In 1997, Bell released four singles: "Rumbled Sex", "Surrender", "Mixed Up", and "Nothing Gonna Stop Me Now"; which featured Potential Bad Boy. In 1999, she formed a new soul band called Soul Explosion. In 2000, she released two singles "Into My World" and "Love's in Need of Love Today" with a group called Dazz. In 2002, she released another single, "(No More) Searching".

In June 2010, she released her autobiography Heart and Soul: The Emotional Autobiography of Melissa Bell.

== Personal life ==
Bell was married to David Burke (born 1954), whom she divorced in 1992 and she was the mother of four children including singer Alexandra Burke. She suffered from diabetes mellitus. She also suffered kidney failure, and struggled to attend many of her daughter's live performances during her time on The X Factor. On 29 August 2017, her daughter Alexandra announced the death of the singer; her family asked for privacy.

During BBC1's The One Show on 25 November 2020, Burke confirmed the proceeds of her 2020 Christmas record "Silent Night", which features the voice of her mother, would all go to The Melissa Bell Foundation. The foundation supports aspiring youngsters wishing to attend the Sylvia Young Theatre School.

== Discography ==
Singles

- 1991: "Walk on the Wild Side" (Bobby E and the Midi City Crew featuring Melissa Bell)
- 1992: "Reconsider"
- 1992: "Crystal Clear"
- 1993: "Wish" (with Soul II Soul)
- 1997: "Rumbled Sex"
- 1997: "Surrender"
- 1997: "Mixed Up"
- 1997: "Nothing Gonna Stop Me Now" (featuring Potential Bad Boy)
- 2000: "Into My World" (with Dazz)
- 2001: "Love's in Need of Love Today" (with Dazz)
- 2002: "(No More) Searching"
- 2009: "Innocent Till Proven Guilty"
