= Get a Life (Soul II Soul song) =

1989 single by Soul II Soul

Single by Soul II Soul

from the album Vol. II: 1990 – A New Decade
- Released: 27 November 1989
- Genre: Rap; dance; soul; R&B
- Length: 3:43
- Label: Virgin
- Songwriters: Hayden "Aitch B" Browne; Beresford "Jazzie B" Romeo
- Producers: Nellee Hooper; Beresford "Jazzie B" Romeo

Soul II Soul singles chronology
| "Back to Life (However Do You Want Me)" (1989) | "Get a Life" (1989) | "A Dreams a Dream" (1990) |

Music video
- "Get a Life" on YouTube

"Get a Life" is a song by British musical collective Soul II Soul, released in November 1989 by Virgin Records as the first single from the collective's second album, Vol. II: 1990 – A New Decade (1990). The song's vocals were performed by Marcia Lewis, and it was written by Hayden "Aitch B" Browne and Beresford "Jazzie B" Romeo, while the latter produced it with Nellee Hooper. It gained success in Europe, reaching number one in Greece, number two in the Netherlands, and number three in the UK. "Get a Life" also became a top-10 hit in Austria, Finland, Ireland, Italy, Luxembourg, Norway, Sweden, and West Germany. Outside Europe, it peaked at number four in Zimbabwe and number five in New Zealand. In the UK, the single sold over 200,000 copies and was certified silver.

== Critical reception ==
The song received positive reviews from music critics. J.D. Considine from The Baltimore Sun felt "there are allusions to Philly soul in the way the bluesy 'Elevate your mind' chorus is played off against a lush string arrangements, echoes of reggae in the deep thump of the bass, and definite African undercurrents to the use of conga and shekere — even if the rest of the drum sound is straight hip-hop." Bill Coleman from Billboard magazine named it a "familiar groove that's infectious nonetheless". Hannsjörg Riemann from German Bravo gave it three out of three, stating that the band already have the next hit with "Get a Life". He wrote further, "The thing, which was spiced up with a loud, rather undisciplined school children's choir in the background, should become a long-running hit this carnival."

Forest Green III from The Michigan Daily opined that the song is a "constant stimulation, basically an ingenious engaging piece of rap/dance/soul/R&B fusion." He added that "helping the euphoric power of the piece are various references to the earlier singles, another perfectly crafted techno beat, a bit of the old 'Feel Free' piano; flutes and strings humming in and out of the groove, and a female singer"." Pan-European magazine Music & Media called it "cool, breezy, funky, simple and effective. Effortlessly seductive and supremely self-assured." People Magazine noted that "a roiling bottom of drums, congas and bass underpins delicate instrumentation and the combined vocals of Jazzy B. rapping and Marcia Lewis and Daddae Harvey singing." Tom Doyle from Smash Hits complimented Lewis' singing voice as "marvellous". Nathaniel Wice from Spin wrote, "The underground club scene's party line is dance music. This is expressed perfectly in 'Get a Life'. The mellow, satisfied rap explains the title's imperative: 'Implement your ideas, put them in motion.... Be an asset to the collective', while a child chorus nags 'What's the meaning of life?' and Marcia Lewi's voice soars over the classical-sounding synth oceans, 'Let your body take control.'"

== Track listing ==
- CD single, UK and Europe (1989)
1. "Get a Life" (7-inch version) – 3:43
2. "Get a Life" (club mix) – 4:31
3. "Keep On Movin'" (Teddy Riley remix) – 6:00
4. "Jazzie's Groove" (new version) – 5:03
- CD single, US (1989)
1. "Get a Life" (12-inch mix) – 4:48
2. "Get a Life" (Bonus Beats) – 3:46
3. "Get a Life" (club mix) – 4:28
4. "Fairplay" (12-inch mix) – 5:55
- CD single, Japan (1990)
1. "Get a Life" – 3:44
2. "Jazzie's Groove" (new version) – 5:04
3. "Back to Life" (club mix) – 7:40
4. "Keep On Movin'" (club mix) – 5:51

== Charts ==
=== Weekly charts ===
| Chart (1989–1990) | Peak position |
|---|---|
| Australia (ARIA) | 38 |
| Austria (Ö3 Austria Top 40) | 8 |
| Belgium (Ultratop 50 Flanders) | 14 |
| Canada Top Singles (RPM) | 84 |
| Canada Dance/Urban (RPM) | 11 |
| Europe (Eurochart Hot 100) | 2 |
| Finland (Suomen virallinen lista) | 7 |
| Greece (IFPI) | 1 |
| Ireland (IRMA) | 6 |
| Israel (Israeli Singles Chart) | 11 |
| Italy (Musica e dischi) | 8 |
| Italy Airplay (Music & Media) | 4 |
| Luxembourg (Radio Luxembourg) | 3 |
| Netherlands (Dutch Top 40) | 3 |
| Netherlands (Single Top 100) | 2 |
| New Zealand (Recorded Music NZ) | 5 |
| Norway (VG-lista) | 5 |
| Sweden (Sverigetopplistan) | 7 |
| Switzerland (Schweizer Hitparade) | 12 |
| UK Singles (Official Charts) | 3 |
| UK Club Chart (Record Mirror) | 1 |
| US Billboard Hot 100 | 54 |
| US 12-inch Singles Sales (Billboard) with "Fairplay" | 2 |
| US Dance Club Play (Billboard) with "Fairplay" | 9 |
| US Hot Black Singles (Billboard) | 5 |
| US Cash Box Top 100 | 54 |
| West Germany (GfK) | 6 |
| Zimbabwe (ZIMA) | 4 |

=== Year-end charts ===
| Chart (1989) | Position |
|---|---|
| UK Singles (OCC) | 48 |

| Chart (1990) | Position |
|---|---|
| Belgium (Ultratop) | 78 |
| Europe (Eurochart Hot 100) | 59 |
| Germany (Media Control) | 60 |
| Netherlands (Dutch Top 40) | 22 |
| Netherlands (Single Top 100) | 54 |
| New Zealand (RIANZ) | 46 |
| UK Club Chart (Record Mirror) | 28 |
| US 12-inch Singles Sales (Billboard) | 36 |
| US Hot R&B Singles (Billboard) | 89 |

== Certifications ==
| Region | Certification | Certified units/sales |
|---|---|---|
| United Kingdom (BPI) | Silver | 200,000^{^} |
^{^} Shipments figures based on certification alone.
