= Doreen Waddell =

- Also known as: Do'reen
- Born: Doreen Tess Waddell; 10 July 1965; Hove, East Sussex, England
- Died: 1 March 2002 (aged 36) Shoreham, West Sussex, England
- Genres: R&B; dance
- Instrument: Vocals
- Years active: 1988–2002
- Formerly of: Soul II Soul

Doreen Tess Waddell (10 July 1965 – 1 March 2002), also known by her stage name Do'reen, was a singer who worked with Soul II Soul, the KLF, T-Funk, and the Phunklawds.

== Music career ==
=== Soul II Soul ===
Waddell sang lead vocals on Soul II Soul's "Feel Free" and "Happiness (Dub)", and backing vocals on other tracks, on their debut album Club Classics Vol. One (1989).

=== KLF ===
She sang backing vocals on the KLF's "Justified and Ancient (All Bound for Mu Mu Land)" (1991).

=== Beat Publique ===
In 1992, Waddell released "Realise" as part of the Beat Publique, which also featured Lunarci and Gary Masters. At the time, she was reportedly working with music producer Peter Harder on her solo career.

=== D'Influence ===
Her solo career included a collaboration with D'Influence on "Ain't Gonna Walk In Your Shadow No More".

== Death ==
Waddell was killed on 1 March 2002 in Shoreham-by-Sea. After being challenged by staff in Tesco at the Holmbush Shopping Centre on suspicion of shoplifting goods, including children's items, she ran through a rear fire exit and attempted to cross the A27 nearby. She was hit by three drivers, dying instantly at the age of 36. She left a four-year-old son.
