= Back to Life (However Do You Want Me) =

1989 song by Soul II Soul

Single by Soul II Soul featuring Caron Wheeler
- Released: 30 May 1989
- Studio: Britannia Row (London)
- Genre: House; proto-jungle; club
- Length: 3:52
- Label: Virgin
- Songwriters: Jazzie B; Caron Wheeler; Nellee Hooper; Simon Law
- Producers: Jazzie B; Nellee Hooper

Soul II Soul singles chronology
"Keep On Movin'" (1989)	"Back to Life (However Do You Want Me)" (1989)	"Get a Life" (1990)

Music video
- "Back to Life (However Do You Want Me)" on YouTube

"Back to Life (However Do You Want Me)" is a song by British R&B band Soul II Soul featuring the Reggae Philharmonic Orchestra. It is an alternate version of a song that appears on their debut album, Club Classics Vol. One (1989) (titled Keep On Movin' in the United States), and was released as its second single on 30 May 1989 by Virgin Records. It is one of two songs on the album featuring British singer Caron Wheeler, along with "Keep On Movin'". Wheeler co-wrote the lyrics with Jazzie B, Nellee Hooper and Simon Law, while Jazzie B and Hooper produced the song.

"Back to Life" gained success in both North America and Europe, topping the charts in Luxembourg, the Netherlands and the United Kingdom and peaking at number four in the United States. Its accompanying music video, directed by Monty Whitebloom & Andy Delaney, of Big TV!, sees the group performing in a forest. Soul II Soul won their first Grammy Award for Best R&B Performance by a Duo or Group with Vocal with the song in 1990. It was later included on a tenth-anniversary edition of the album.

== Origin ==
This song is said by its writer and singer, Caron Wheeler, to have been written about a near death experience in which she nearly passed on but was sent "back to life" to fulfill the rest of her mission on Earth, saying:

"Back to Life" came about from my own pain and I nearly died... I nearly died and literally came back to life and I was mad, because where I had gone in between that was so wonderful... but I basically didn't pass over at that point... I was mad, I was like, "Why do you want me here? However do you want me? What do you need from me?" You know, I was talking to my creator, but it sounds like a party song on the record...

== Production ==
The album version of the song was an a cappella which was remixed and re-recorded before being released as a single. Two new versions were produced — the first taking the original recording with instrumentation added, and the second was a re-working of the song with new lyrics and chorus (also adding "However Do You Want Me" to the title). It was the second version that became most popular. In a 2012 interview with British newspaper The Guardian on how "Back to Life" was made, producer Jazzie B said:

Everything about this single was magic. We weren't trying to follow any trend or fit into any category – we were just doing our own thing. ... Its shuffling beats were a cross between reggae and what was to become known as hip-hop: breakbeats and electronic sound. Caron Wheeler's vocal, coming over these very heavy bass beats, was the icing on the cake. ... We also had the Reggae Philharmonic Orchestra on the track, and the RPO became a key part of our sound. ... We often look to America for our influences, but this was a moment that put British music back on the map. It also came out at a special time in the industry's history – just before digital took over and everything seemed to fall apart.

For a time, the album was packaged together with a mini CD single including the new versions of the song.

== Critical reception ==
Robert Hilburn from Los Angeles Times wrote, "Another classy and imaginative dance-floor soundscape from the London team that gave us 'Keep On Movin''. The album version is mostly a cappella (and it's fine), but the 7-inch single is even more seductive." Another Los Angeles Times editor, Duff Marlowe, remarked that the "gorgeously arranged", a cappella "Back to Life", "shows that the sound-system concept not only works, but also may be an effective way of presenting a wide range of talent." Jerry Smith from Music Week praised it as another "totally mesmerising killer track" from the "dance floor stylists", adding, "Hard beats and Caron Wheeler's silky vocals will ensure heavy chart action once more." Pat Sharp for Smash Hits named it Single of the Fortnight, writing, "Brilliant. I don't have to listen to this one. I know it really well already. I much prefer it to 'Keep On Movin''." He concluded, "This one is miles better. I've been playing this one for a while. It's really simple and tuneful." It went on to win the group their first Grammy Award for Best R&B Performance by a Duo or Group with Vocal in 1990.

=== Retrospective response ===
In a 2019 retrospective review, Justin Chadwick from Albumism wrote in his review of Club Classics Vol. One, "While 'Keep on Movin'' lit the fuse for the group's ascendance across radio and the sales charts, another Wheeler blessed composition kept the flame burning bright. Originally—and in retrospect, somewhat incredulously—included on the album in stripped-down, acapella form, 'Back to Life' further illuminated Wheeler's vocal prowess as she sang about seeking romantic clarity, with the drums borrowed from Graham Central Station's 'The Jam' kicking in at the 2:40 mark. In short order following the album's release, the song was reworked into a more robust midtempo groove, its instant earworm appeal and unforgettable hook (How ever do you want me, how / How ever do you need me) all but ensuring its ubiquity throughout the summer of 1989."

AllMusic editor Alex Henderson named it a "Chic-influenced gem". In a 2009 review, Daryl Easlea for BBC praised its "swooning chorus and churning beat". In 2015, Eric Harvey from Pitchfork wrote, "The mainstream got a taste of house music that was stately and groovy, not dripping with acid, and which sounded fantastic amid clubbish contemporaries like Black Box's 'Ride on Time', Technotronic's 'Pump Up the Jam', Janet Jackson's 'Miss You Much', and Lisa Stansfield's 'All Around the World'."

== Chart performance ==
"Back to Life (However Do You Want Me)" peaked at number one on both the US Billboard Dance Club Play chart and the Canadian RPM Dance chart. It reached number four on the Billboard Hot 100, becoming Soul II Soul's only top-10 hit in the United States. In the United Kingdom, it reached number one on the UK Singles Chart for four weeks in June and July 1989. In Europe, it peaked at number one in Luxembourg and the Netherlands as well as on the Eurochart Hot 100. The single entered the top 10 in Belgium, Greece, Ireland, Sweden, Switzerland and West Germany. It was also a top-20 hit in both Austria and Finland. In Oceania, it peaked at number four in New Zealand and number 45 in Australia. "Back to Life (However Do You Want Me)" earned a gold record in Canada and Sweden, a silver record in the UK, and a platinum record in the US.

== Music video ==
The music video for "Back to Life (However Do You Want Me)" was directed by Monty Whitebloom and Andy Delaney, of Big TV! and was shot in Epping Forest. Wheeler's former-Afrodiziak member and friend Claudia Fontaine sings and dances to the song along with Jay Curley (Jayzik Azikiwe) throughout the video.

The video starts with an opening silhouette of the group dancing in a forest and proceeds with repeated close-up shots of Wheeler singing "Back to life, back to reality". While Wheeler sings the first verse, video shots of the other Soul II Soul members and the band are shown. Another scene is shown on a rooftop during early sunrise as the group parties and dances to the song. Close to the end of the video, the group is shown dancing at night on the same rooftop. Wheeler closes out the song as she sings and dances to the song. The video was later made available by Vevo on YouTube in 2009, and by August 2025, it had generated more than 110 million views.

== Live performances ==
Wheeler performed "Back to Life (However Do You Want Me)" on various televised appearances, including the Arsenio Hall Show, Rockopop, and Later... with Jools Holland. At the end of 1989, Wheeler later departed from the group. When Soul II Soul performed the song at 1990 Soul Train Music Awards, Marcia Lewis; a new addition to the group, performed the lead vocals.

The song was included in the group's set list for their A New Decade Tour in 1990 and was performed late in the set on tour dates. Lamya, a later addition to group, performed the lead vocals to the song during the tour. Wheeler also included the song during her solo tours. A live recording of the song was released on Wheeler's live CD/DVD Live at Duo Music Exchange, which featured her performing live in Tokyo, Japan. In 2007, Wheeler reunited with the group and performed the song at the Lovebox Festival. In August 2012, Soul II Soul performed the song at the Rewind Festival in Remenham, Berkshire, with Charlotte Kelly singing lead vocals.

In December 2016, Soul II Soul released their live album Origins: The Roots of Soul II Soul which included a live recorded version on the song, sung by Wheeler.

== Impact and legacy ==
In 1991, "Back to Life (However Do You Want Me)" was awarded a BMI College Radio Award and one of BMI's Pop Awards, honoring the songwriters, composers and music publishers of the song. VH1 ranked it number 50 in its list of the "100 Greatest Dance Songs" in 2000. Q Magazine ranked it number 534 in their list of the "1001 Best Songs Ever" in 2003. Slant Magazine ranked the song number 57 in its list of the "100 Greatest Dance Songs" in 2006. The Guardian featured "Back to Life (However Do You Want Me)" on its "A History of Modern Music: Dance" in 2011. In 2015, the song was voted by the British public as the nation's 18th favourite 1980s number one in a poll for ITV. In 2022, Rolling Stone magazine included it in their list of "200 Greatest Dance Songs of All Time".

=== Accolades ===
Year	Publisher	Country	Accolade	Rank
2000	VH1	United States	"100 Greatest Dance Songs"	50
2003	Q	United Kingdom	"100 Songs That Changed the World"	67
2003	Q	United Kingdom	"1001 Best Songs Ever"	534
2005	Bruce Pollock	United States	"The 7,500 Most Important Songs of 1944–2000"	*
2005	Pitchfork	United States	"The 200 Best Songs of the 1980s"	119
2005	Q	United Kingdom	"50 Greatest British Tracks"	38
2005	Süddeutsche Zeitung	Germany	"1020 Songs 1955–2005"	*
2006	Slant Magazine	United States	"100 Greatest Dance Songs"	57
2010	Groove	Germany	"Die 100 wichtigsten Tracks der letzten 20 Jahre"	*
2011	The Guardian	United Kingdom	"A History of Modern Music: Dance"	*
2011	Max	Australia	"1000 Greatest Songs of All Time"	517
2015	ITV	United Kingdom	"The Nation's Favourite 80s Number One"	18
2013	Robert Dimery	United States	"1,001 Songs You Must Hear Before You Die"	*
2019	Billboard	United States	"Billboard's Top Songs of the '80s"	212
2019	Max	Australia	"1000 Greatest Songs of All Time"	853
2020	Slant Magazine	United States	"The 100 Best Dance Songs of All Time"	41
2022	Rolling Stone	United States	"200 Greatest Dance Songs of All Time"	182

(*) indicates the list is unordered.

== Track listings ==
- UK basic single
1. "Back to Life (However Do You Want Me)" (album version) – 3:48
2. "Back to Life (However Do You Want Me)" (instrumental) – 4:23
- UK 12-inch single
1. "Back to Life (However Do You Want Me)" (club mix) – 7:37
2. "Back to Life (However Do You Want Me)" (Jam on the Groove) – 5:08
3. "Back to the Beats" – 4:38
- US maxi-single
1. "Back to Life" (12-inch mix) – 7:37
2. "Back to Life" (a capella intro version) – 3:29
3. "Back to Life" (LP version) – 3:50
4. "Back to Life" (Jam & The Groove) – 5:08
5. "Back to Life" (Bonus Beats) – 4:38

== Charts ==
=== Weekly charts ===
Chart (1989–1990)	Peak position
Australia (ARIA)	49
Austria (Ö3 Austria Top 40)	13
Belgium (Ultratop 50 Flanders)	4
Canada Retail Singles (The Record)	1
Canada Top Singles (RPM)	11
Canada Dance/Urban (RPM)	1
Europe (Eurochart Hot 100)	1
Finland (Suomen virallinen lista)	14
Greece (IFPI Greece)	2
Ireland (IRMA)	6
Israel (Israeli Singles Chart)	2
Italy Airplay (Music & Media)	2
Luxembourg (Radio Luxembourg)	1
Netherlands (Dutch Top 40)	1
Netherlands (Single Top 100)	1
New Zealand (Recorded Music NZ)	4
Sweden (Sverigetopplistan)	3
Switzerland (Schweizer Hitparade)	2
UK Singles (Official Charts)	1
US Billboard Hot 100	4
US 12-inch Singles Sales (Billboard)	1
US Dance Club Play (Billboard)	1
US Hot Black Singles (Billboard)	1
West Germany (GfK)	4

=== Year-end charts ===
Chart (1989)	Position
Belgium (Ultratop)	42
Canada Dance/Urban (RPM)	2
Europe (Eurochart Hot 100)	19
Israel (Israeli Singles Chart)	31
Netherlands (Dutch Top 40)	7
Netherlands (Single Top 100)	18
Switzerland (Schweizer Hitparade)	8
UK Singles (OCC)	5
US 12-inch Singles Sales (Billboard)	2
US Dance Club Play (Billboard)	3
US Hot Black Singles (Billboard)	11
West Germany (Media Control)	30

Chart (1990)	Position
US Billboard Hot 100	42

=== Decade-end charts ===
Chart (1990–1999)	Position
Canada (Nielsen SoundScan)	55

== Certifications ==
Region	Certification	Certified units/sales
Canada (Music Canada)	Gold	50,000^{^}
New Zealand (RMNZ)	Gold	15,000^{‡}
Sweden (GLF)	Gold	25,000^{^}
United Kingdom (BPI) Sales since 2004	Platinum	600,000^{‡}
United Kingdom (BPI) 1989 physical sales	Silver	200,000^{^}
United States (RIAA)	Platinum	1,000,000^{^}
^{^} Shipments figures based on certification alone.^{‡} Sales+streaming figures based on certification alone.

== Cover versions ==
In 1991, English singer-songwriter George Michael covered "Back to Life" live during his Cover to Cover tour. In 2019, American singer and songwriter Hilary Roberts covered the song, her version reaching number one on the US Dance Club Songs chart.

== Samples ==
The song samples:

Graham Central Station – The Jam: drum track

Songs that have sampled this song include:

- Maxi Priest – "Close to You"
- Big Boi – "Shutterbugg"
- The Game – "However Do You Want It"
- Sean Kingston - "Back 2 Life (Live It Up)"
- Burna Boy - "Update"
- Little Mix - "Bounce Back"

== In popular culture ==
An a cappella version was featured in the opening scene of the 1998 film Belly. The song was also featured in the Opening Ceremony of the 2012 London Olympics, as part of an extended dance sequence involving popular British songs from the 1960s through the 2010s.

== See also ==
- List of Billboard number-one dance songs of 2019
