= Soul II Soul =

British musical collective

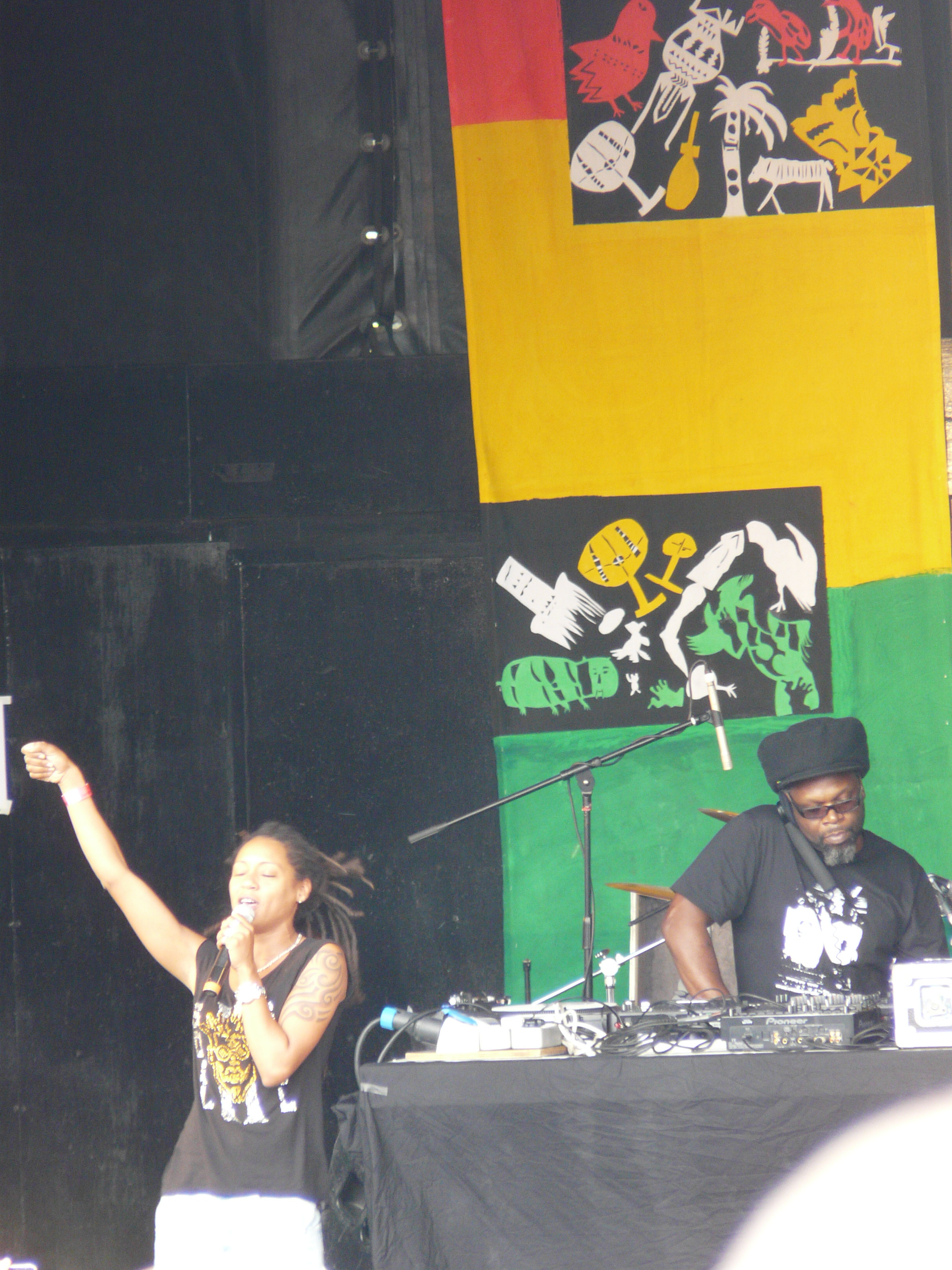
- Soul II Soul performing at the Lambeth Country Show in Brockwell Park in 2010

Background information
- Origin: London, England
- Genres: Soul; neo soul; dance; R&B; rap; British soul; reggae rock
- Years active: 1988–1998; 2007–present
- Labels: Virgin; EMI
- Members: Jazzie B; Charlotte Kelly
- Past members: Simon Law; Rose Windross; Doreen Waddell; Caron Wheeler; Marcia Lewis; Victoria Wilson-James; Lamya Al-Mugheiry; Kym Mazelle; Jazzi Q; Nellee Hooper; Melissa Bell; Aitch Bee; Penny Ford; Daddae; Gota Yashiki
- Website: soul2soul.co.uk

Soul II Soul are a British musical collective formed in London in 1988. They are best known for their two major hits: 1989's UK number five and US number eleven "Keep On Movin'", and its follow-up, the UK number one and US number four "Back to Life". They have won two Grammy Awards, and have been nominated for five Brit Awards, twice for Best British Group.

== Career ==
The group initially attracted attention as a sound system some years prior to 1988, run by founder Jazzie B, playing at nights including their own at the Africa Centre, London. Though the venue's capacity was limited to approximately 300 people, weekly attendance often exceeded that number, with crowds gathering outside. According to Jazzie B, speaking in an interview featured in What Do You Call It? From Grassroots to the Golden Era of UK Rap (2024), the growing popularity of the nights drew increasing attention: “All the controversy that went with it only made it more popular.”

By 1988, the official lineup was Jazzie B, Caron Wheeler, Nellie Hooper, Simon Law, Doreen Waddell, Rose Windross, Daddae, Aitch B, and Jazzie Q. They released their first single, "Fairplay", with Rose Windross on lead vocals, recorded at the Africa Centre. where the collective hosted a regular Sunday-night residency. The song charted at number 63 on the UK Singles Chart, while their follow-up single "Feel Free", which featured Doreen on lead vocals, charted at number 64.

The weekly club night, having grown ever more popular, moved to the much larger The Fridge Nightclub in Brixton, South London, where it would remain well into the 1990s. The collective used the venue to test their musical composites on the dance floor. Together with an eclectic mix of “Funki Dredd" – "A happy face, a thumpin' bass, for a lovin' race!" – themed club classics that combined British, Caribbean, African, and African American influences. One night in 1988, the residency hosted a personal appearance by the nascent rap group N.W.A. who were briefly in the UK promoting their album Straight Outta Compton. A plaque now commemorates the collective's significant influence on the original venue, which closed in 2010 but which was subsequently renamed and reopened as the Electric Brixton.

During the late 1980s, Jazzie B and several other members of the group became involved in the local pirate radio station movement. Jazzie B hosted a show on KISS-FM.

In March 1989, their label released the group's single "Keep on Movin'", featuring Caron Wheeler on lead vocals. The song became a success and also sold over one million copies in the US. The following month, the group's first album Club Classics Vol. One was released. The album peaked at number one on the UK Albums Chart and sold over four million copies worldwide. The group's next single, "Back to Life", became their biggest hit, hitting the top five on the US Hot 100 and number one on the UK Singles chart. The single went on to win the group their first Grammy Award for Best R&B Performance by a Duo or Group with Vocal in 1990. The group would continue to see some UK success but "Back to Life" would be the second and last US hit for the group.

In late 1989, Waddell and Windross departed from the group. Marcia Lewis, a cousin of Jazzie B, joined the group. The single "Get a Life", which featured Lewis on lead vocals, charted at number three on the UK Singles chart. The song also sold over 60 thousand copies in the United Kingdom. Lewis' debut performance came on Top of the Pops when she performed alongside Caron Wheeler and Jazzie B.

=== 1990: Volume II A New Decade and lineup changes ===
In early 1990, Wheeler officially left the group to pursue her solo career. To fill out the group's dynamic, Jazzie B turned to a few singers he had performed with in the past. This led to the brief addition of Kym Mazelle, Lamya, and Victoria Wilson-James to the new lineup. With a new official lineup, the group released their second album, Vol. II: 1990 – A New Decade, which peaked at number one on the UK Albums Chart.

The album's second single "A Dreams a Dream", which features Victoria Wilson James on lead vocals, performed well on the chart. The album's third single "People", featuring Lewis on lead vocals, garnered moderate success on the charts but managed to achieve success on the Dance charts. The album's final single "Missing You", featuring Kym Mazelle on lead vocals, also performed well on the charts. In the mid-1990s, the group toured throughout the United Kingdom. One of their concerts at Brixton Academy was recorded live and released in September 1990, titled A New Decade: Live from Brixton Academy. After the conclusion of the tour, Wilson-James, Mazelle, Lewis left the group to pursue solo careers.

=== 1991–1993: Volume III Just Right and another lineup change ===
In 1991, Soul II Soul was in need of lead vocalists for the recording of their third album. During recording sessions, Jazzie B recruited guest singers Richie Stephens, Kofi, Penny Ford, Rick Clarke, along with the re-addition of Caron Wheeler to record on the album.

In April 1992, Soul II Soul released their third album, Volume III Just Right. The album's lead single, "Joy", performed by Stephens, reached the top ten on the UK Singles Chart. The follow-up single "Move Me No Mountain", performed by Kofi on lead vocals, achieved moderate success in the UK. The third single, "Just Right", suffered the same fate, relegating the album to limited and moderate sales figures.

The group toured for a brief time throughout 1993. In November 1993, the group released their greatest hits album Volume IV The Classic Singles 88–93. The album spawned the single "Wish", which featured the new addition to the group Melissa Bell on lead vocals.

=== 1994–1997: Volume V Believe, lineup changes, Time for Change ===
In 1994, Soul II Soul prepared to record their fourth album. Despite her career as an established solo artist, Caron Wheeler once again joined the group and committed to the recording of the group's upcoming album. During the record sessions, Wheeler and Jazzie B struggled with creative difficulties for the production of the album. This ultimately led to Wheeler leaving the group again during the recording of the song "Love Enuff". Now without an official lead singer for the group, Jazzie B was left to recruit a few singers once more. Penny Ford, background vocalist on the group's single "Move Me No Mountain", officially became a member of the group. Charlotte Kelly, a background vocalist from the group's previous tour, was also recruited to join the group. Melissa Bell and Lamya also contributed vocals to the forthcoming album.

In January 1995, Soul II Soul and Isaac Hayes also performed "Papa Was a Rollin' Stone" live on French TV show Taratata, with Kelly on lead vocals. In June 1995, Soul II Soul released the single "Love Enuff". The single retained the use of Wheeler's pre-recorded background vocals and Penny Ford on lead vocals. The song invited Soul II Soul to perform on Top of the Pops with Ford performing lead vocals. In August 1995, Soul II Soul released their fourth studio album, Volume V Believe. The album's second single "I Care", which features Charlotte on lead vocals, charted at number 17 on the UK Singles Chart.

In August 1997, the group released their fifth studio album, Time for Change. The album featured the singles "Represent" and "Pleasure Dome".

=== 1998–2006: Disbandment and aftermath ===
In 1997, Daddae teamed up with Joey Jay and Norman Jay to produce the roots reggae dub reggae album "I n I Deal With Roots" under the collective appellation, The Truth, which was successful with Jah Shaka followers. The album reworked drum and bass structures and production techniques from King Tubby, Prince Alla,Yabby You, Big Youth's iconic Screaming Target album, as well as sampling bass lines from The Palmer Brothers Step it Out of Babylon In 1998, the group officially disbanded with each member pursuing solo careers. Following their disbandment, several members including Wilson-James, Mazelle, Lamya, and Kelly would release solo albums which would each garner success, respectively. Marcia Lewis and Kym Mazelle would also go on to become educators. In 1999, Kelly released her self-titled debut album, which spawned the number-one Dance chart single "Skin". The group often reunited and performed for a few selected dates over the course of their hiatus.

In March 2002, Doreen Waddell, who had been living in Hove following her departure, died at 36 after being hit by three cars while she was fleeing from a shoplifting incident. In July 2002, Lamya released her solo debut album Learning from Falling, which spawned the number-one Dance chart single "Empires (Bring Me Men)".

=== 2007–2012: Reunion ===
In 2007, Soul II Soul reformed at the Lovebox Festival in Victoria Park, London. The lineup consisted of Caron Wheeler, Jazzie B, Aitch B, with the new addition of MC Chickaboo. In December 2008, a radio programme about Soul II Soul was broadcast on BBC Radio 4. In January 2009, Lamya died of a heart attack.

The Soul II Soul Sound System featuring Caron Wheeler toured Australia nationally in February 2009. They performed at the Playground Weekender Festival near Sydney. Soul II Soul performed live at the Yasalam free concerts in conjunction with the 2009 Formula 1TM Etihad Airways Abu Dhabi Grand Prix celebrations in October 2009.

In 2010, Soul II Soul reunited for their reunion tour with the lineup consisting of Jazzie B, Caron Wheeler, Rose Windross, Kym Mazelle, Charlotte Kelly, Aitch B, and MC Chickaboo. The group toured until the end of 2011. Following the tour, Kelly and Wheeler performed on-and-off as the featured vocalists for Soul II Soul. In 2012, Soul II Soul performed at the Lovebox Festival in which Kelly performed as the featured vocalist. In June 2012, Soul II Soul received the honorary PRS Heritage Plaque award. Jazzie B, Wheeler, Daddae, Mazelle, Kelly, Aitch B were among the members present. They also performed during the ceremony. In August 2012, Soul II Soul (Jazzie B, Jazzi Q, Aitch B, Caron Wheeler, and MC Chickaboo) performed at Channel 4's "House Party". In December 2012, Soul II Soul performed "Keep on Movin'" and "Back to Life (However Do You Want Me)" on Later... with Jools Holland with Caron Wheeler as the lead vocalist. They also confirmed to be working on a new album.

=== 2013–present: Later years ===
In April 2013, Jazzie B and Charlotte Kelly launched the Soul II Soul "Classics" Collection at Harvey Nichols in London, England. The Classics Collection features T-shirts and sweatshirts with Soul II Soul's Funky Dred logo. In the same year, Kelly left the group again and Wheeler rejoined. In 2014, Soul II Soul performed at the Lovebox Festival.

In 2016, Soul II Soul released a single, "A New Day", credited to Caron Wheeler, which features production from Jazzie B and Louie Vega. Soul II Soul released their live album Origins: The Roots Of Soul II Soul on 9 December 2016.

In May 2017, Soul II Soul performed at Electric Brixton, with Caron Wheeler and Charlotte Kelly as the lead vocalists.

On 28 August 2017, Melissa Bell died after suffering from kidney failure.

The group appeared on Jools' Annual Hootenanny on New Year's Eve in 2017.

== Members timeline ==
=== Current members ===
- Jazzie B – co–lead vocals, turntables (DJ), rapper, producer, programming (1988–present)
- Charlotte Kelly – lead vocals (1994–1997, 2008, 2010–2013, 2017–present)

=== Touring and session musicians ===
- Ellen Blair – violin (1988–present)
- Gota Yashiki – programming (1988)
- Nellee Hooper – producer, programming (1988–1997)
- Simon Law – producer, keyboards, drums (1988)
- Emma "S.E.L." Louise – backing vocals (2007–2017)
- Samantha Pennells – backing vocals (2007–2017)
- Jody Findley – backing vocals (2007–2017)
- MC Chickaboo – turntables (DJ), rapper (2007–2018)
- Gill Morley – violin (2007–present)
- Nadine Caesar – backing vocals, co–lead vocals (2018–present)
- Nikisha Reyes – backing vocals (2018–2020)
- Tanya Edwards – backing vocals (2018–2020)

=== Former members ===
- Doreen Waddell – co–lead vocals (1988; died 2002)
- Rose Windross – co–lead vocals (1988), (2010–2011)
- Jazzi Q – turntables (DJ) (1988–1990), (2012)
- Caron Wheeler – lead vocals (1988–1990), (1992), (1995), (2007–2010), (2013–2019)
- Aitch Bee – turntables (DJ) (1988–1995), (2007), (2012)
- Nellee Hooper – producer (1988–1992)
- Daddae – co–lead vocals, turntables (DJ), rapper, producer (1988–1995; died 2024)
- Marcia Lewis – lead vocals (1989–1990)
- Lamya Al-Mugheiry – co–lead vocals (1990)
- Victoria Wilson-James – co–lead vocals (1990)
- Kym Mazelle – co–lead vocals (1990), (2010–2011)
- Penny Ford – lead vocals (1992–1995)
- Melissa Bell – co–lead vocals (1993–1995; died 2017)

== Awards and nominations ==
Award	Year	Nominee(s)	Category	Result	Ref.
American Music Awards	1990	Themselves	Favorite Soul/R&B Band/Duo/Group	Nominated	
American Music Awards	1990	Themselves	Favorite Soul/R&B New Artist	Nominated	
American Music Awards	1990	Themselves	Favorite Dance New Artist	Nominated	
American Music Awards	1990	"Back to Life (However Do You Want Me)"	Favorite Dance Song	Nominated	
American Music Awards	1990	"Keep On Movin'"	Favorite Soul/R&B Song	Nominated	
Brit Awards	1990	Themselves	British Group	Nominated	
Brit Awards	1990	Themselves	British Breakthrough Act	Nominated	
Brit Awards	1990	Club Classics Vol. One	British Album of the Year	Nominated	
Brit Awards	1990	"Back to Life (However Do You Want Me)"	British Single of the Year	Nominated	
Brit Awards	1991	Themselves	British Group	Nominated	
Grammy Awards	1990	Themselves	Best New Artist	Nominated	
Grammy Awards	1990	"Back to Life (However Do You Want Me)"	Best R&B Performance by a Duo or Group with Vocal	Won	
Grammy Awards	1990	"African Dance"	Best R&B Instrumental Performance	Won	
Grammy Awards	1993	"Mood"	Best R&B Instrumental Performance	Nominated	
Ivor Novello Awards	1990	"Back to Life (However Do You Want Me)"	Best Contemporary Song	Nominated	
Ivor Novello Awards	1990	"Back to Life (However Do You Want Me)"	The Best Selling "A" Side	Nominated	
NAACP Image Awards	1989	Keep On Movin'	Outstanding Album	Nominated	
Q Awards	2015	Club Classics Vol. One	Classic Album	Won	
Soul Train Music Awards	1990	Club Classics Vol. One	Best R&B/Urban Contemporary Album – Group, Band, or Duo	Won	
Soul Train Music Awards	1990	"Keep On Movin'"	Best R&B/Urban Contemporary Single – Group, Band, or Duo	Won	
Soul Train Music Awards	1990	"Keep On Movin'"	Best R&B/Urban Contemporary Song of the Year	Won	
Soul Train Music Awards	1990	Themselves	Best R&B/Urban Contemporary New Artist	Nominated	

== Discography ==
- Club Classics Vol. One (1989)
- Vol. II: 1990 – A New Decade (1990)
- Simply Mad About The Mouse (1991)
- Volume III Just Right (1992)
- Volume V: Believe (1995)
- Time For Change (1997)

== See also ==
- List of number-one dance hits (United States)
- List of artists who reached number one on the US Dance chart
