= Kym Mazelle =

American singer (born 1960)

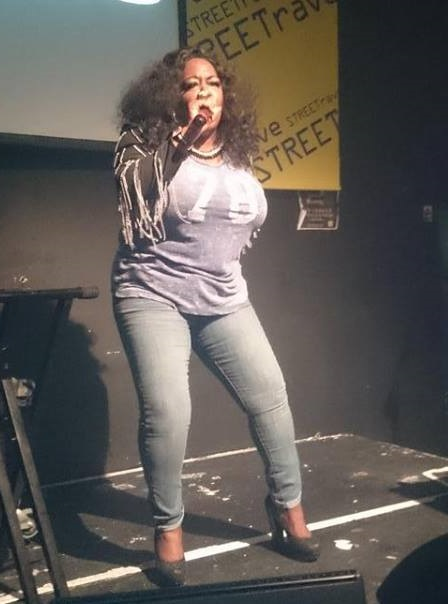
- Mazelle in 2014
- Born: Kymberly Grigsby; August 10, 1960 (age 66); Gary, Indiana, U.S.
- Occupations: Singer; songwriter
- Years active: 1986–present
- Musical career
- Genres: House; R&B; dance; soul; pop; gospel
- Instrument: Vocals
- Labels: Capitol; EMI
- Website: officialkymmazelle.com

Kym Mazelle (born Kymberly Grigsby; August 10, 1960) is an American singer. Credited as "The First Lady of House Music", she is regarded as a pioneer of house music in Europe. Her music combines R&B, soul, funk, house music, dance, and pop.

== Biography ==
=== Early life ===
Mazelle was born in Gary, Indiana. She lived on the same street as the Jackson family and knew Michael Jackson's mother and uncle. In 1981, she attended Mundelein College in Chicago. In 1982, she transferred to Columbia College Chicago, where she graduated with a bachelor's degree in Arts and Entertainment Media Management in 1986. During college, she worked part-time as an intern and secretary at Lyric Opera of Chicago.

=== Career ===
In 1987, she worked with record producer Marshall Jefferson (as House To House) on the single "Taste My Love", released on Police Records label. In 1988, she released the single "Useless (I Don't Need You Now)", a hit on the club charts which reached at No. 53 on the UK singles chart. Her next release, "Wait," a duet with Robert Howard from The Blow Monkeys in 1989, peaked at No. 7 in the UK. In 1989, Mazelle's debut album Crazy was released in the UK and featured the single "Love Strain". With the single "Was That All It Was" returned Mazelle to the UK Top 40 and "Useless (I Don't Need You Now)" was remixed by Norman Cook.

In 1990, Mazelle joined British music group Soul II Soul. Her lead vocals on the single "Missing You" on their second album Vol. II: 1990 – A New Decade achieved major success worldwide. She also toured with the group throughout the year and their concert DVD A New Decade: Live from Brixton Academy was released in September 1990. In 1991, Parlophone Records repackaged Mazelle's debut album as Brilliant!! with remixes of her singles, two new tracks and remixes of "No One Can Love You More Than Me" and "Crazy 'Bout The Man". Mazelle also appeared as "Pattie Roman" on the show Trainer, a sitcom originating from Great Britain. In 1992 Kym had a hit with Rapination also known as the Rapino Brothers with “Love me the right way” This was a euro piano house sound and was a popular hit in the U.K. particularly the club scene.

In 1994, she scored a No. 13 hit in the UK with a cover on "No More Tears (Enough Is Enough)", with Jocelyn Brown. Two years later, in 1996, Mazelle released a cover version of the song "Young Hearts Run Free", which appeared in the 1996 Baz Luhrmann film William Shakespeare's Romeo + Juliet and also appeared on the director's remix album Something for Everybody. The soundtrack went triple platinum in the United States of America. The success of the single re-invited Mazelle to perform on Top of the Pops.

She has appeared on two live albums by Maceo Parker, Life on Planet Groove and My First Name is Maceo. Mazelle released her second album The Pleasure Is All Mine in June 2004 and undertook a tour in the UK. The album spawned two singles: "Love Magic" and "On My Own". In 2005, Mazelle took part in the British version of the reality TV show, Celebrity Fit Club. In April 2007, she appeared in the Ray Charles's tribute show "I Can't Stop Loving You".

In July 2010, Mazelle joined the cast of UK theatre production of Smokey Joe's Cafe. She also appeared on the BBC Television series, Celebrity MasterChef. In September 2010, she released an extended play titled Destiny.

She headlined Liverpool Pride on August 6, 2011. On November 3, 2011, she headlined Prince Charles's Prince's Trust Ambassador Ball in Glasgow and helped to raise £93,000.00 for the charity on the night. On April 6, 2013, her appearance on The Voice UK was broadcast on the BBC. In 2017, Mazelle embarked on her 30th Anniversary Tour, celebrating thirty years in the music industry.

== Discography ==
=== Albums ===
- Crazy / Brilliant! (1989)
- The Pleasure Is All Mine (2004)
- Destiny (2010)

=== Compilations ===
- Brilliant!! (1991) – European remix compilation, with 3 new tracks
- The Gold Collection (1996)

=== Singles ===
==== Solo singles ====
Single	Year	Peak chart positions									Album
Single	Year	US	US Dance	AUS	BEL	FRA	GER	NED	NZ	UK	Album
"Useless (I Don't Need You Now)"	1988	—	13	—	—	—	—	—	—	53	Crazy (UK/EUR); Brilliant! (US/CAN)
"Wait!" (duet with Robert Howard)	1989	—	—	—	20	—	26	32	—	7	Crazy (UK/EUR); Brilliant! (US/CAN)
"Got to Get You Back"	1989	—	—	—	—	—	57	—	—	29	Crazy (UK/EUR); Brilliant! (US/CAN)
"Love Strain"	1989	—	—	—	—	—	—	—	—	52	Crazy (UK/EUR); Brilliant! (US/CAN)
"Was That All It Was"	1990	—	—	—	—	—	—	—	—	33	Crazy (UK/EUR); Brilliant! (US/CAN)
"Don't Scandalize My Name"	1990	—	22	—	—	—	—	—	—	—	Crazy (UK/EUR); Brilliant! (US/CAN)
"Useless (I Don't Need You Now)" (Norman Cook Remix)	1990	—	—	—	—	—	—	—	—	48	Brilliant! (European remix compilation)
"No One Can Love You More Than Me" (Boilerhouse Remix)	1991	—	—	—	—	—	—	—	—	62	Brilliant! (European remix compilation)
"Woman of the World"	1991	—	—	—	—	—	—	—	—	—	Trainer — OST
"Love Me the Right Way" (with Rapination)	1993	97	—	—	—	—	—	—	—	22	Non-album single
"No More Tears (Enough Is Enough)" (duet with Jocelyn Brown)	1994	—	—	48	46	—	—	—	—	13	Non-album single
"Gimme All Your Lovin'" (duet with Jocelyn Brown)	1994	—	—	—	—	—	—	—	—	22	Non-album single
"Love Me the Right Way '96" (with Rapination)	1996	—	20	—	—	—	—	—	—	55	Non-album single
"Young Hearts Run Free"	1996	—	—	11	—	29	88	—	16	20	Romeo + Juliet — OST
"Have a Nice Day"	1997	—	—	—	—	—	—	—	—	—	Non-album single
"A Place in My Heart"	1998	—	—	—	—	—	—	—	—	—	Non-album single
"Love Magic"	2004	—	—	—	—	—	—	—	—	—	The Pleasure Is All Mine
"On My Own"	2005	—	—	—	—	—	—	—	—	—	The Pleasure Is All Mine
"Here Comes the Light"	2010	—	—	—	—	—	—	—	—	—	Destiny
"Can You Feel It" (with Junior and Sinitta)	2021	—	—	—	—	—	—	—	—	—	non album single
"—" denotes releases that did not chart or were not released.

==== As featured artist ====
Single	Year	Peak chart positions					Album
Single	Year	US R&B	US Dance	IRE	NED	UK	Album
"Taste My Love" (House to House featuring Kym Mazelle)	1987	—	—	—	—	—	Non-album single
"Missing You" (Soul II Soul featuring Kym Mazelle)	1990	29	39	24	74	22	Vol. II: 1990 – A New Decade
"Love Me or Leave Me" (Kamasutra presents Kym Mazelle)	1995	—	—	—	—	—	Non-album single
"Searching for the Golden Eye" (Motiv-8 and Kym Mazelle)	1996	—	—	—	—	40	Non-album single
"Free, Gay & Happy" (Paradise People featuring Kym Mazelle)	1997	—	—	—	—	—	Non-album single
"Truly" (Peshay featuring Kym Mazelle)	2000	—	—	—	—	55	Miles from Home
"Perhaps" (Sunray featuring Kym Mazelle)	2001	—	—	—	—	—	Non-album single
"Dance Little Dreamer" (Infinito featuring Kym Mazelle)	2001	—	—	—	—	—	Non-album single
"Feel Like Dancin'" (House Bros. featuring Kym Mazelle)	2003	—	—	—	—	—	Non-album single
"Change" (Yann Vedra featuring Kym Mazelle)	2014	—	—	—	—	—	Non-album single
"Lovin'" (David Morales presents The Face featuring Kym Mazelle)	2015	—	—	—	—	—	Non-album single
"—" denotes releases that did not chart or were not released.

== Filmography ==
=== Television ===
Year	Title	Role	Episode	Refs
1991	Trainer	Pattie Roman	"A Question of Loyalty"	
1991	Trainer	Pattie Roman	"Business or Pleasure"	

== Tours ==
- A New Decade Tour (1990) (with Soul II Soul)
- 25 Year Anniversary Tour (2011–12) (with Soul II Soul)
- Kym Mazelle 30th Anniversary Tour (2017)
