= Jazzie B =

British DJ (born 1963)

Jazzie B OBE
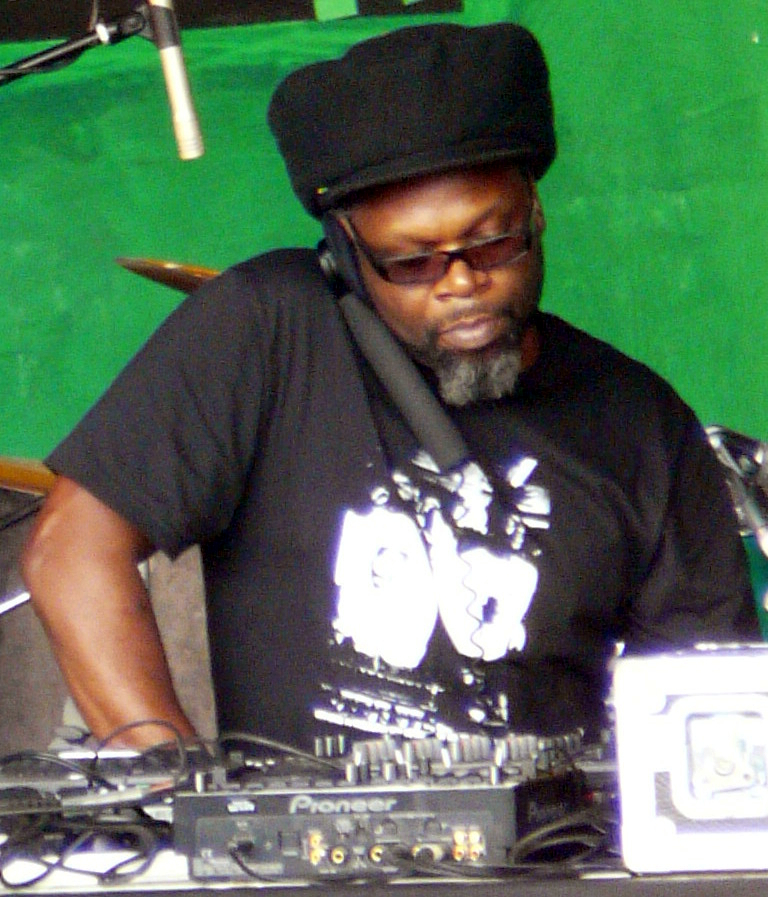
- Jazzie B with Soul II Soul in Brockwell Park
- Born: Trevor Beresford Romeo; 26 January 1963 (age 63); Hornsey, London, England
- Other name: The Funki Dred
- Occupations: DJ; music producer
- Musical career
- Website: jazzieb.co.uk

Trevor Beresford Romeo OBE (born 26 January 1963), better known as Jazzie B, is a British DJ and music producer. He is the founder of music collective Soul II Soul.

== Life and career ==
Jazzie was born in London UK to parents of Antiguan descent in Hornsey, London, the ninth of 10 children, several of whom began running sound systems in the 1960s and 1970s. At the age of 18, Jazzie was working for cockney pop/skiffle musician Tommy Steele, as a tape operator. He had his first gig in 1977 working with friends under the Rastafari name Jah Rico. He changed their working name to Soul II Soul in 1982. Soul II Soul was originally an umbrella name for several of his projects - the sound system, a clothing line and Camden record shop, a record imprint, as well as the group itself.

From 1985 to 1989, Jazzie and Soul II Soul held nights at the Africa Centre in Covent Garden. The Soul II Soul track "Fairplay" was recorded there just before the group started to find wider success. The nights at the Africa Centre would be celebrated in the 2003 compilation, Soul II Soul At The Africa Centre.

In March 1991, he launched the label Funki Dreds and signed the singers Lady Levi and Kofi to the label. At this time, he would also host a show on then pirate radio station Kiss FM, which would continue through its legal licence and until 1997. From 2009 to 2012, Jazzie B hosted the "Back 2 Life" radio show on BBC London 94.9, which he then brought to Mi-Soul since 2014.

Jazzie B has produced and remixed tracks for those including Incognito, Maxi Priest, James Brown, Kym Mazelle, Cheryl Lynn, Teena Marie, Johnny Gill, Ziggy Marley, Nas, Destiny's Child, and his wife Efua Baker.

He is a founding director of the Featured Artists Coalition.

== Honours ==
In 2002, he was listed first in the Business category of the "100 Great Black Britons" list.

He was appointed Officer of the Order of the British Empire (OBE) by Elizabeth II in the 2008 New Year Honours.

In May 2008, he was awarded the first Inspiration award at the Ivor Novello Awards, for being "a pioneer" and "the man who gave black British music a soul of its own".

On 7 February 2024, at the 26th annual Mobo Awards, he was awarded the Lifetime Achievement Award after more than 40 years in the music business. On accepting the award, he cited those who went before from the Windrush generation.

== Discography ==
=== Compilation albums ===
- Jazzie B Presents Soul II Soul at the Africa Centre (Casual, 2003)
- Jazzie B Presents School Days: Life Changing Tracks From The Trojan Archives (Trojan, 2008)
- Masterpiece (Ministry of Sound, 2008)

== Personal life ==
He is married to recording artist and fitness expert Efua Baker, and they are parents to two children, Mahlon Romeo who played professional football for Cardiff City up to July 2024, and actress Jessye Romeo.
