= Best of Me (Maxi Priest album) =

- European album cover

Greatest hits album by Maxi Priest
- Released: 1991
- Labels: 10 Records; Charisma; Virgin
- Producers: Mikey Bennett; Geoffrey Chung; Augustus "Gussie" Clarke; Clifton Dillon; Sly Dunbar; Nellee Hooper; Jazzie B; Willie Lindo; J.P. "Bluey" Maunick; Paul Robinson; Robbie Shakespeare; Handel Tucker; Drummie Zeb

Maxi Priest chronology
Bonafide (1990)	Best of Me (1991)	Fe Real (1992)

Alternative cover
- International album cover

Best of Me is a greatest hits album by English reggae vocalist Maxi Priest, released in 1991. The album mostly contains Priest's biggest hit singles up to 1991, including the US Billboard Hot 100 number one single, "Close to You". The majority of the tracks are from his first four studio albums: You're Safe (1985), Intentions (1986), Maxi (1987) and Bonafide (1990).

== Critical reception ==
Professional ratings
Review scores
Source	Rating
AllMusic	4.5/5 stars

In a review for AllMusic, Jose F. Promis gave Best of Me four and a half out of five stars, describing it as "timeless, breezy, and thoroughly engaging". Promis also described the album package as featuring "great pictures, song lyrics, and detailed liner notes".

== Track listing ==
No.	Title	Writer(s)	Length
1.	"Wild World"	Cat Stevens	3:36
2.	"In the Springtime"	Max Elliott; Paul Robinson; C. Henry	4:08
3.	"Should I"	Elliott; Robinson	3:34
4.	"Close to You"	Elliott; Gary Benson; Winston Sela	5:29
5.	"How Can We Ease the Pain" (Adam Moseley Mix; featuring Beres Hammond)	Elliott; Raymond Simpson	5:12
6.	"Let Me Know"	Elliott; Angus Gaye; Tony Robinson	3:33
7.	"Housecall" (with Shabba Ranks)	Elliott; Mikey Bennett; Rexton Gordon; Brian Thompson; Clifton Dillon	3:58
8.	"Just a Little Bit Longer"	Handel Tucker	3:37
9.	"Caution"	Elliott; P. Robinson; David Emmanuel; Peter St. Aubyn	4:52
10.	"Some Guys Have All the Luck"	Jeff Fortang	3:35
11.	"I Know Love" (featuring Tiger)	Elliott; Bennett; Norman Jackson	4:39
12.	"Strollin' On"	Elliott; P. Robinson	3:19
13.	"Best of Me"	Elliott; Peter Hunnigale	3:08
14.	"Crazy Love"	Van Morrison	4:37
15.	"Woman in You"	Elliott; J.P. Maunick; Andy Scott; Simpson	4:57
16.	"Peace Throughout the World" (with Jazzie B)	Elliott; Maunick	4:00

== Personnel ==
Producers

- Mikey Bennett (track 7)
- Geoffrey Chung (tracks 4, 13)
- Augustus "Gussie" Clarke (tracks 8, 11)
- Clifton Dillon (track 7)
- Sly Dunbar (tracks 1, 4, 5, 10, 13)
- Nellee Hooper (track 16)
- Jazzie B (track 16)
- Willie Lindo (tracks 1, 5, 10)
- J.P. "Bluey" Maunick (track 15)
- Paul Robinson (tracks 2, 3, 9, 12)
- Robbie Shakespeare (tracks 1, 5, 10)
- Handel Tucker (tracks 4, 13)
- Drummie Zeb (tracks 6, 14)

Other production

- Executive producer: Erskine Thompson
- Project co-ordination by Erskine Thompson and Sue Thompson
- Compiled and edited by Crispin Murray
- Mastered by Gordon Vicary at The Townhouse, London

== Charts ==
Chart (1991–92)	Peak position
Australian Albums (ARIA)	122
UK Albums (Official Charts)	23

== Certifications ==
Region	Certification	Certified units/sales
United Kingdom (BPI)	Gold	100,000^{^}
^{^} Shipments figures based on certification alone.
