= Bonafide (Maxi Priest album) =

Studio album by Maxi Priest
- Released: 29 June 1990
- Recorded: 1989−90
- Studios: Music Works Recording Studio, Penthouse Studios and Mixing Lab Studio (Kingston, Jamaica); Groove Music (Ocho Rios, Jamaica); Livingston Studios, Roundhouse Studios, Lillie Yard Studio, Terminal 24 Studios, Britannia Row Studios, First Protocol Studios and Maison Rouge Studios (London, England); The Pink Museum (Liverpool, England)
- Genres: Reggae fusion; pop; R&B; soul
- Length: 53:07
- Label: Charisma
- Producers: Phil Bodger; Geoffrey Chung; Augustus "Gussie" Clarke; Peter D.; Sly Dunbar; Donovan Germain; Nellee Hooper; Jazzie B; Carlton Ogilvie; Handel Tucker

Maxi Priest chronology
Maxi / Maxi Priest (1987)	Bonafide (1990)	Best of Me (1991)

Singles from Bonafide
- 1. "Close to You" Released: 8 July 1990; 2. "Peace Throughout the World" Released: 1990; 3. "Human Work of Art" Released: December 1990; 4. "Just a Little Bit Longer" Released: 1991; 5. "Space in My Heart" Released: 1991

Professional ratings
Review scores
Source	Rating
AllMusic	2/5 stars
Chicago Tribune	2.5/4 stars
Robert Christgau	C+
The Encyclopedia of Popular Music	3/5 stars
The Rolling Stone Album Guide	3/5 stars

Bonafide is the fourth studio album by the English pop/reggae singer Maxi Priest. It was released in 1990 by Charisma Records. The album peaked at number 47 on the Billboard 200 in the United States, while its biggest hit, "Close to You", was a smash, peaking at number one that year.

Three other singles were issued: "Human Work of Art" ("Close to You"'s predecessor, which did not chart in the US), "Just a Little Bit Longer" (a minor hit at 62) and "Space in My Heart" (failed to chart). However, the success of "Close to You" (a gold single on 30 October 1990) drove the album to gold status, which it received on 30 January 1991 by the Recording Industry Association of America.

== Critical reception ==
The AllMusic review by Ron Wynn stated: "Priest scored a #1 pop hit with 'Close to You' from this album, which is more pop/R&B with a reggae touch than it is real reggae." The Los Angeles Times wrote that the album "avoids the scattershot syndrome that often afflicts projects with multiple producers." The Milwaukee Sentinel called Bonafide a "tour de force" and "smooth, seductive, stylistic and very, very addictive."

== Track listing ==
No.	Title	Writer(s)	Length
1.	"Just a Little Bit Longer"	Handel Tucker	4:23
2.	"Close to You"	Max Elliott; Gary Benson; Winston Sela	5:25
3.	"Never Did Say Goodbye"	Elliott; Ian Green; Jean-Paul Maunick	4:05
4.	"Best of Me"	Elliott; Peter Hunnigale	3:38
5.	"Space in My Heart"	David Austin; Elliott	3:41
6.	"Human Work of Art"	Michael Leeson; Peter Vale	4:09
7.	"Temptress"	Mikey Bennett; Hopeton Lindo	5:06
8.	"Peace Throughout the World" (featuring Jazzie B)	Elliott; Maunick	4:38
9.	"You"	Elliott; Benson; Sela	4:29
10.	"Sure Fire Love"	Elliott; Phil Radford; Peter Yellowstone	3:54
11.	"Life"	Elliott; Paul Robinson	4:15
12.	"Prayer for the World"	Jimmy Scott; Frank Musker	5:17

== Personnel ==
- Maxi Priest – vocals, backing vocals (3)
- Handel Tucker – keyboards (1–4, 10–12), drum programming (1), arrangements (1–4, 10–12), bass (2), keyboard bass (11)
- Robbie Lyn – keyboard bass (1), synthesizers (7), keyboards (9)
- Peter D. Rose – keyboards (3, 12), keyboard bass (3), drums (3, 12), drum programming (3, 12)
- Martyn Phillips – keyboards (5, 8)
- Carlton "Bubblers" Ogilvie – keyboards (6), drums (6), drum programming (6), arrangements (6)
- Danny Browne – acoustic piano (7), keyboards (7), guitars (7)
- Leo Grant – keyboards (9, 11)
- Stanley Andrew – guitars (6)
- Leroy "Mafia" Heywood – bass (1, 4, 6, 9, 10, 12)
- Wycliffe "Steely" Johnson – bass (7)
- Robbie Shakespeare – bass (12)
- Sly Dunbar – drums (2–4, 10–12), drum programming (2–4, 10–12), arrangements (2–4, 10–12)
- Nellee Hooper – drums (5, 8), drum programming (5, 8), arrangements (5, 8)
- Cleveland "Clevie" Browne – drums (7)
- Erskine Thompson – vibraphone (3)
- Luís Jardim – percussion (5, 8)
- Rass Brass – horns (1)
- Ray Carless – saxophones (4)
- Dennis Rollins – trombone (4)
- Barbara Snow – trumpet (4)
- Howard Ball – violin (5)
- Bill Benham – violin (5)
- Dean Fraser – vocal arrangements (1, 7), horns (9)
- Geoffrey Chung – arrangements (2–4, 10–12)
- Jazzie B – arrangements (5, 8), DJ (8)
- The Music Works Crew – arrangements (7)
- Brian and Tony Gold – backing vocals (1, 7)
- Nadine Sutherland – backing vocals (1, 12)
- Paul Robinson – backing vocals (2–4, 10, 11)
- Janice Hoyle – backing vocals (4)
- Beverley Skeete – backing vocals (4, 6, 10)
- Claudia Fontaine – backing vocals (5)
- Cleveland Watkiss – backing vocals (5)
- Donald Campbell – backing vocals (6)
- Toyin Adekale – backing vocals (8)
- Derrick Cross – backing vocals (8)
- Kimberley James – backing vocals (8)
- Pam Hall – backing vocals (12)
- J.C. Lodge – backing vocals (12)
- Stanley "Stanrick" Ricketts – backing vocals (12)
- Gavin "Fullness" Sant – backing vocals (12)
- Junior Tucker – backing vocals (12)

Reggae Philharmonic Orchestra on "Close to You"

- Mykell Riley – string contractor
- Ellen Blair, Pamela Crawford, Ivan Hussey, Stephen Hussey, Sara Lorwenthal, Yolisa Phahle and John Taylor – string players

=== Production ===
- Maxi Priest – executive producer, additional production (9, 10)
- Erskine Thompson – executive producer
- Augustus "Gussie" Clarke – producer (1, 7)
- Geoffrey Chung – producer (2–4, 10–12)
- Sly Dunbar – producer (2–4, 10–12)
- Handel Tucker – producer (2–4, 10–12)
- Phil Bodger – additional production (2, 3, 11)
- Peter D. Rose – additional production (3)
- Nellee Hooper – producer (5, 8)
- Beresford "Jazzie B" Romero – producer (5, 8)
- Carlton Ogilvie – producer (6), additional production (7)
- Paul Rabiger – additional production (7)
- Donovan Germaine – producer (8)
- Leroy "Mafia" Heywood – additional production (9, 10)
- Stylorouge – art direction, design
- Eamon J. McCabe – photography
- Level Vibes Ltd. – management

Technical

- Sylvester Gordon – recording (1, 7)
- Courtney Small – recording (1, 7)
- Paul Rabiger – mix engineer (1, 4, 6, 9, 12), mixing (4, 6, 7, 12), remix engineer (7), remixing (9), recording (12)
- Jeremy Allom – recording (2–4, 10–12)
- Phil Bodger – mixing (2, 3, 11), mix engineer (2, 3, 11)
- Dominic Robson – recording (3)
- Peter D. Rose – mixing (3, 12)
- Nellee Hooper – mixing (5, 8)
- Jazzie B – mixing (5, 8)
- Guy Fixsen – recording (6)
- Marcus Lindsey – recording (6)
- Carlton Ogilvie – mixing (7)
- Ruddy Thomas – recording (9)
- Steven Stanley – mixing (10)
- William Stuart – recording (12)
- Leo Grant – mix assistant (2, 12), mix engineer (10)

== Charts ==
=== Weekly charts ===
Weekly chart performance for Bonafide
Chart (1990)	Peak position
Australian Albums (ARIA)	25
Austrian Albums (Ö3 Austria)	25
Canada Top Albums/CDs (RPM)	12
Dutch Albums (Album Top 100)	42
European Albums (Music & Media)	37
German Albums (Offizielle Top 100)	32
New Zealand Albums (RMNZ)	8
Swedish Albums (Sverigetopplistan)	11
UK Albums Chart	11
US Billboard 200	47

=== Year-end charts ===
Year-end chart performance for Bonafide
Chart (1990)	Position
Canada Top Albums/CDs (RPM)	64
Swedish Albums (Sverigetopplistan)	49

== Certifications ==
Region	Certification	Certified units/sales
Canada (Music Canada)	Gold	50,000^{^}
United Kingdom (BPI)	Gold	100,000^{^}
United States (RIAA)	Gold	500,000^{^}
^{^} Shipments figures based on certification alone.
