= Fe Real =

Studio album by Maxi Priest
- Released: 1992
- Genre: Reggae
- Label: Charisma

Maxi Priest chronology
Best of Me (1990)	Fe Real (1992)	Man with the Fun (1996)

Fe Real, stylized as fe Real, is the fifth studio album by the English musician Maxi Priest, released in 1992. It was nominated for a Grammy Award for "Best Reggae Album". The title character of Terry McMillan's novel How Stella Got Her Groove Back listens to the album while on vacation in Jamaica.

The album peaked at No. 60 on the UK Albums Chart, at No. 130 on the Australian ARIA Chart, and at No. 191 on the Billboard 200.

== Production ==
The album was recorded in Jamaica, England, and the United States. Many producers worked on the album, including Sly Dunbar. Junior Giscombe toasted on "Make My Day".

== Critical reception ==
Professional ratings
Review scores
Source	Rating
AllMusic	2/5 stars
The Encyclopedia of Popular Music	2/5 stars
MusicHound World: The Essential Album Guide	1.5/5 stars
The Philadelphia Inquirer	3.5/4 stars

The Philadelphia Inquirer wrote: "Built on a subtle foundation of reggae dance-hall riddems, Priest rides the Caribbean groove and never allows it to become monotonous—rare for the genre." Rolling Stone considered "Hard to Get" "the best of the reggae-tinged tracks." The Atlanta Journal-Constitution praised the "infectious mix of reggae and R&B arrangements."

== Singles ==
Three singles were released from the album. The first single was "Groovin' in the Midnight", which reached number 50 in the UK Singles Chart and number 63 on the US Billboard Hot 100. The second single from the album was "Just Wanna Know", released as a double A-side with the song "fe Real", which features British singer-songwriter Apache Indian. Despite sharing the same title, "fe Real" wasn't included on Priest's album of the same name, but is included on Apache Indian's debut album, No Reservations. The double A-sided single reached number 33 in the UK Singles Chart. "One More Chance" was the third single released from the album, reaching number 40 in the UK.

== Track listing ==
No.	Title	Writer(s)	Length
1.	"Can't Turn Away"	Max Elliott; Gary Benson; Winston Sela	5:02
2.	"Promises"	Elliott; J.P. Maunick; Richard Bull	4:02
3.	"Just Wanna Know (U.K. Mix)"	Elliott; Raymond Simpson; Mikey Bennett	3:50
4.	"Groovin' in the Midnight"	Elliott; Bennett; David Morales; Handel Tucker	4:58
5.	"Make My Day"	Elliott; Junior Giscombe	4:54
6.	"Ten to Midnight"	Elliott; Bennett; Michael Spence; Ip So Facto	4:24
7.	"One More Chance"	Elliott; Simon Law; Trevor Davy; Lee Hamblin	5:25
8.	"Sublime"	Mick Leeson; Peter Vale	5:35
9.	"Amazed Are We"	Elliott; Annabel Lamb; Andy Scott; Sylvester Nathaniel	4:47
10.	"Hard to Get"	Elliott; Tony Stephenson; Dwight Pinkney; Trevor Ropers	6:20
