= No Reservations (Apache Indian album) =

Studio album by Apache Indian
- Released: January 1993
- Studio: Tuff Gong, Kingston, Jamaica; Unknown studio, New York City, New York, United States
- Genre: Ragga; bhangra; reggae; dancehall; dance; electronic
- Length: 60:49
- Label: Mango; Island; PolyGram
- Producer: Simon and Diamond; Bobby Digital; Phil Chill; Sly Dunbar

Apache Indian chronology
No Reservations (1993)	Make Way for the Indian (1995)

Singles from No Reservations
- 1. "Arranged Marriage" Released: January 1993; 2. "Chok There" Released: March 1993

No Reservations is the debut studio album by British-Asian musician Apache Indian, released in January 1993 by Island Records and their subsidiary Mango. The musician and singer recorded the album primarily in Jamaica's Tuff Gong studios with producers including Simon and Diamond, Bobby Digital, Phil Chill and Sly Dunbar. It follows, and includes, Apache Indian's 1990–91 singles – "Move Over India", "Chok There" and "Don Raja" – which saw him pioneer a fusion of Jamaican ragga and Indian bhangra later known as bhangramuffin.

The album showcases Apache Indian's fusion of ragga and dancehall beats and basslines with bhangra and other forms of Indian music, such as filmi, with songs delivered in a fusion of English, Punjabi and Jamaican patois that the musician called "Indian patois". He sought to write about topics that were traditionally undiscussed in Asian communities, such as alcoholism, AIDS, the caste system and arranged marriages, and the controversial nature of the lyrics drew criticism and protest from castes. The singer named the record with reference to Indian reservations and is depicted on the artwork before a mixture of Jamaican and Indian iconography, reflecting his mix of musical styles.

On release, No Reservations drew acclaim from music critics, who saw its fusion of ragga and bhangra modes as innovative, and it reached number 36 on the UK Albums Chart. "Arranged Marriage", issued as the album's official lead single, was the musician's breakthrough success in his home country, reaching number 16 on the UK Singles Chart. Apache Indian was particularly successful in India, where the album sold over 500,000 copies and is certified triple platinum. No Reservations has been credited for helping popularise ragga music and British-Asian pop, and was shortlisted for the 1993 Mercury Prize, while Apache Indian received four nominations at the 1994 Brit Awards.

== Background ==
Born Steven Kapur to an Indian migrant family, Apache Indian was raised in Handsworth, a multiracial neighbourhood in Birmingham home to reggae bands Steel Pulse and UB40. He grew up enjoying roots reggae artists like Bob Marley and Burning Spear, and interest in reggae grew larger when introduced to sound system culture by a British-Caribbean man, Sheldon, who ran the local Siffa sound system. Kapur began chatting with numerous systems, and grew out dreadlocks in his teens. He later said he was the only Indian he knew who enjoyed reggae, saying "There was just something about the music. Regardless of what anybody said, it was for me." However, as Kapur would later explain, it was common for Asians in Birmingham to "[pick up] things from the black kids 'cus they're living together. So you hear reggae in schools and in the streets, but you also hear traditional Indian music as well." Kapur took part of his stage name from Super Cat or the "Wild Apache", a Jamaican reggae musician who is also of Indian descent, and who was Kapur's musical idol.

Kapur developed his own musical style in 1990, when he visited a cousin's recording studio in Birmingham to record "Move Over India", featuring his own lyrics, dance beats and tabla. The musician modelled the song on the popular "Shank I Sheck" riddim and wrote lyrics around the theme of translation, with the song providing "rudimentary lessons in Punjabi and patois". Although he did not intend to release the song, he changed his mind when his friends enjoyed it and pressed a few private copies for himself, local pirate station PRCL and nearby reggae shops. An official release followed on Sure Delight Records, and it reached number one in Britain's reggae and bhangra charts, where it stayed for six weeks. The song was also popular in Jamaica, sold over 500,000 copies on the Indian subcontinent and was heavily bootlegged in Canada. Kapur credits the single for helping solidify young Asian aesthetic, combining Asian, white and black fashions.

"Move Over India" and Apache Indian's subsequent singles saw him fuse Indian bhangra and Jamaican reggae, earning him the media title The Originator of Bhangra-Muffin, a combination of the words bhangra and raggamuffin, although the singer did not care for the term. Bhangra had become popular in the UK in the mid-1980s and was, according to Timothy D. Taylor, the first music to "develop a strong Anglo-Asian identity", particularly, argued Brooke Wentz of Vibe, when young practitioners began introducing influences of hip hop to make bhangra more danceable than the original, folk-based form, with Apache Indian proving innovative for introducing reggae to the genre. Apache Indian explained he initially received criticism from the Indian community, who saw him, as he described it, as a "traitor to the community" for working in reggae, a genre that was seen as "violent and drug-related", but that attitudes changed when he expressed his Indian pride. Similarly, he said "the black community felt I was using reggae to make a lot of money" but changed their minds upon discovering his genuine love of the genre.

The translation themes of "Move Over India" carried over into its proposed follow-up, "Come Follow Me", which featured Birmingham MC Mickey G, but the single was cancelled after the song had been heavily bootlegged. Instead, Apache Indian's next two singles, both for Sure Delight, were "Chok There" and "Don Raja". Aided mostly by pirate radio airplay, both singles continued Kapur's success in topping the UK's bhangra and reggae charts. In 1991, The British Reggae Industry Awards awarded Kapur with the award for Best Male Newcomer. Although none of his singles had reached the national pop charts, they attracted the attention of Island Records, who signed him in early 1992. Marc Marot of Island said they judged Apache Indian "just from those singles [...] We felt that he had commercial possibilities regardless of where he came from and what background he had." After signing to Island, he made a national television appearance in the UK on Blue Peter.

== Recording ==
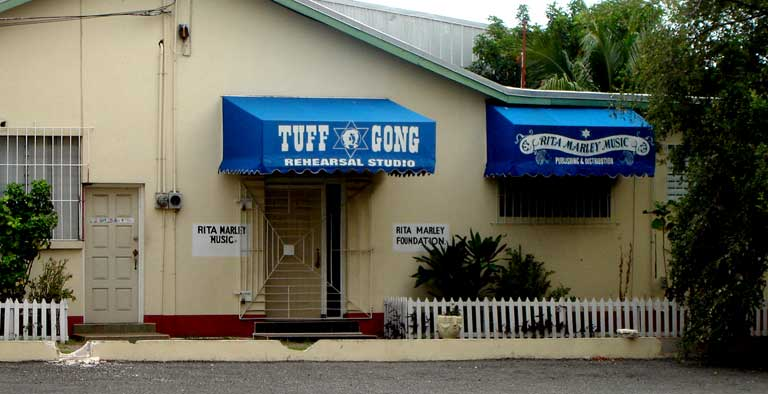
Tuff Gong, the Kingston studio that part of No Reservations was recorded in

According to Apache Indian's manager, Mambo Sharma, "so much thought" went into recording No Reservations because, as the singer's debut album, it had to introduce listeners to his work effectively. Apache Indian travelled to Bob Marley's Tuff Gong Studios in Kingston, Jamaica, to record part of No Reservations. He collaborated with numerous reggae stalwarts, including Sly Dunbar, Robert Livingston and Bobby Digital, who all provided riddims for the album, as well as vocalists Frankie Paul and Maxi Priest. Most of the album, however, was produced by Simon & Diamond, with production credits for Phill Chill on "Fix Up", Bobby Digital on "Guru" and Dunbar on "Magic Carpet", with Livingston providing mixing and additional production on "Fix Up". Apache Indian and Trevor Wyatt acted as executive producers, while Phill Chill mixed "Arranged Marriage".

According to writer Les Back, Apache Indian's decision to record in Jamaica with local reggae luminaries was partly an attempt to legitimise his fusion of reggae with bhangra, while journalist Dave Cavanagh said the "slew of the island's big names" helped endorse the album's ragga elements. Although Kapur enjoyed working with reggae musicians, he made a conscious decision to "separate from the Jamaican music scene," according to Wentz, with Kapur explaining that he made an effort "to lean more towards my people." Part of the album was also recorded in New York City. No Reservations incorporates electronic production and digital sampling, which combined with Kapur's toasting and affinity for sound systems, situates the music in what writer Carla J Maier calls "the clubs and the recording studios in which he works, while at the same time being part of a globalized and digitalized music culture." Kapur's earlier singles, including "Move Over India" and "Chok There", reappear on the album.

== Composition ==
=== Music ===
On No Reservations, Apache Indian uses beats and basslines familiar to reggae and dancehall, incorporates styles and samples of bhangra, Hindi filmi music and Indian classical music to represent his Indian identity, and sings in a ragga style, resulting in what writer John Connell describes as "a contemporary Anglo-Indian fusion". Although described as primarily a bhangra album, critic Ken Hunt argues that the album is not bhangra itself but rather a "bhangra-related dance music." J. Poet of Trouser Press similarly felt the record to primarily showcase Kapur as a raggamuffin deejay, while Caroline Sullivan of The Guardian observed that Kapur uses Indian instruments and subject matter to flavour a "macho" ragga style derived from Super Cat. Apache Indian considered his style to be "first, and foremost, street music", explaining: "My stuff is all about the fusion of cultures and styles. I grew up with black and white people, my music is part of the people around me". The sounds of sitar and "hard-edged" tabla permeate the record. David Vlado Moskowitz considers No Reservations to be more mainstream than Kapur's earlier releases, while Eamon Carr of the Evening Herald, who considers the album to fuse "club styles, cultures and funky beats", emphasises the "ear for a commercial hook".

The album opens with the sound of a "hail of bullets", a "gangster stance" familiar to reggae and rap which is deflated by Kapur's boast that he is "hotter than vindaloo curry". The re-appearing "Chok There" fuses bhangra and ragga rhythms, notably using a pronounced dhol drum riddim, and features sitar and percussion breaks. Despite its challenging subject matter, "Aids Warning" is among the album's poppiest songs. Considered the record's most Indian-styled track, with its sampled usage of Indian filmi music and tabla, "Arranged Marriage" opens with a dancehall-style introduction with Indian instrumentation, namely a dhol drum, a flute hook line and tabla. Taylor writes that although reggae dominates the song, the "distant sounds of India", like the aforementioned instruments and "vocalise of Indian film music", as well as its "folklike ululations", flitter among "the edges". Also features is synthesised harmonium, an instrument popular in South Asian religious music. "Don't Touch", a duet with Frankie Paul, features what Cavanagh describes as an "unadulterated JA sound", while he described "Come Follow Me" as a "barely-reggae, acoustic guitar-based Indian tour guide"

=== Lyrics ===
I am on a mission. Music can be very, very powerful. I will use it as my tool, I get thousands of letters from people, they want me to talk about their problems in my music [...] I have covered AIDS, alcohol, arranged marriage and the caste system. I am prepared to take the hassle aimed at me for dealing with these issues in my music. Asian people haven't had a voice. I don't think I can change people's minds but perhaps I can make a start."

— Apache Indian, 1993

The album's lyrics, written by Apache Indian, feature social commentary and themes of social realism. Colin Larkin wrote that the record moved Kapur "away from the frothier elements of his distinctive ragga-reggae and towards the role of social commentator and Anglo-Asian representative." The songs are "relevant to Indian youth identity in Britain," according to Connell, while writer Steve Tilley says they deal with concerns typical to Asian youth, and they discuss racism, AIDS, arranged marriages, divorce, alcoholism, drugs, the caste system and bridging black-Asian hostilities, often taking a cautionary stance. References to the Taj Mahal, Amritsar, Gandhi and Ravi Shankar also feature.

Many of the issues Kapur raises on the album were traditionally undiscussed within Asian communities, with the singer intending to discuss things "that haven't been talked about before". He commented that religious upbringing in Asian communities left numerous subjects "that need to be discussed among the Asian community – like arranged marriages, and AIDS... I'm not saying that we're going to solve the problem, I just want to bring them out in the open for discussion". The controversial themes proved threatening to Indian, who was told by several people that he should avoid discussing such issues, and he hired security wherever he travelled. His bodyguard, Kid Milo, explained to Sullivan in March 1993: "The Indian community don't take kindly to his singing about street things. They feel he should keep certain subjects within the community. The castes get offended and they stick together. We had a bomb threat at a record-signing the other day, and they petrol-bombed a club he was appearing at in Toronto."

Kapur sings on the album in a mix of English, Jamaican and Punjabi patois, with songs generally being "dancehall Jamaican English in style," cramming words and slangs from other communities. He uses words from the three patois interchangeably, often in reference to the "sonic geography of his influences", as on "Chok There", in which he references Karachi, New York, Kingston and London. According to Raoul Granqvist, Apache Indian's style takes everyday words from Punjabi and dancehall cultures and uses them "interchangeably and in elaborate combinations," resulting in what Kapur calls "Indian patios", described by Granqvist as an "urban lingua franca which provides a suture between communities while acknowledging specificities of their African and south Asian roots."

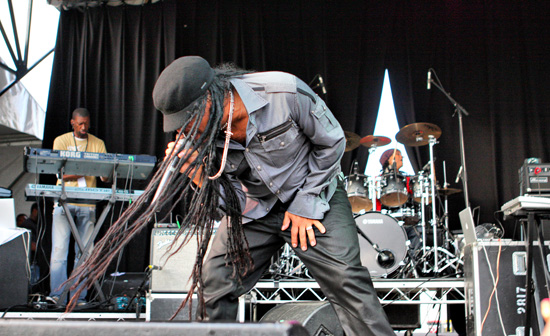
Reggae singer Maxi Priest (2011), sings Punjabi lyrics on "Fe Real".

"Chok There", whose titles translates to "raise the floorboards" in Punjabi, is chanted using English and Jamaican patois, and sees the singer assume the persona of Don Raja, a dreadlocked Indian raggamuffin who "bring a new stylee" and "a different fashion". "Fe Real", a cover of a Super Cat song, is a duet with reggae singer Maxi Priest, who recorded his Punjabi lyrics to the song at Tuff Gong. On the song, Kapur refers to himself as an Arawak Indian. The singer wrote "Aids Warning" after people with AIDS came to him admitting they "didn't know what to do or how to deal with it". Kapur explained: "Whoever addresses these issues – problems of caste – must take on board the hassle." "Move Over India" was written in tribute to India, at a time when he had never visited but felt he knew the country well from Indian films, and he toasts on the song over off-beats. On "Badd Indian", Kapur's fuses the bombastic boasts of dancehall with another vernacular tradition from the Caribbean, Trinidadian "robber talk", and sees the singer adopt the mask of a Native American, a popular masquerade at the Trinidad and Tobago Carnival. "Don Raja" has been interpreted as an ironic urge to "subvert colonialist stereotyping," particularly with its lyrics "Don Raja a come! Straight from Delhi on magic carpet! With a million watts of hockey stick!".

"Arranged Marriage", among the most contentious songs, is sung in Jamaican patois and Punjabi deals with arranged marriages, a tradition known to cause tribulation among British-Asian youth. Granqvist says the song best exemplifies the album's exploration of masculinity and young Asian men's issues; they write that although the narrator takes the song through an arranged marriage, and features a seemingly bravado refrain in "Me want gal to look after me", the song is inverted by the line "But when is the right time to tell my girlfriends?", which echoes how other young Asian men in the UK develop relationships with women "and then have to reckon with the family marriage arrangements." Kapur felt that white listeners would miss the song's irony, adding "That is the truth for a lot of Asian people. I am not against arranged marriages but people have to realise that growing up in places like Birmingham, London or Toronto young people are going to have relationships". The last line, "Me want arrange marriage from me mum and daddy", drew particular complaints from older Asian listeners. Although the narrator's wife does not speak on the song, a woman is occasionally heard singing wordlessly in the style of Indian film music. Roger Chamberland said this singing provides the song with its strongest "South Asian ambience".

== Title and artwork ==
The No Reservations album cover combines the flags of India and Rastafari.

Described by author Rainer Emig as a punning statement on "segregation and integration", the title No Reservation references Indian reservations. This allusion to Native American culture is consistent with Kapur's stage name and the lyrics of songs "Fe Real" and "Badd Indian", as well as later album titles Make Way for the Indian (1995) and Wild East (1997). Natalie Sarrazin interprets the names Apache Indian and No Reservation as "signifying not only political resistance, but making light of the idea that all people of colour are lumped together in one category". George Lipsitz observed that due to Kapur's stage name and the album title, several listeners speculated that the singer was a Native American himself. Apache Indian recalled that his confluence of British, American and Native American cultures became "a problem" when No Reservations was released, as Native Americans "were fighting for no reservations at the time. But it was good in a kind of way because it helped the album. They identified with it in a way."

Immi Dread Cally designed the album artwork using photography of Kapur by Kate Garner. The album cover reflects Apache Indian's mix of musical styles, depicting him depressed in clothes that combine elements from Rastafarian and American hip-hop fashions with British-Asian street style. The singer's haircut, credited to Jon the Man of Curtis, represents, as Maier describes it, "a trend in the early 1990s among South Asians to wear artfully shaved hairstyles." Behind the singer is a paper-cut backdrop showing the Indian and Rastafarian flags, although the latter is distorted and only truly represented by its usage of red, gold and green. The back cover features a collage depicting Indian rupees and Jamaican dollars, and maps of Jamaica and Punjab, India.

== Release and promotion ==
"The combination of irresistible beats, volatile, timely messages, and matinee-idol looks have made this 26-year-old immigrants' son larger than he could have possibly imagined before he got into the bhangra biz three years ago."

— Brooke Wentz, Vibe

After Apache Indian's signing to Island, the label planned a promotional push for the singer. In 1992, "Fe Real" was released by Maxi Priest's label Virgin Records as a double A-side with his song "Just Wanna Know". It became Apache Indian's first hit single, reaching number 33 on the UK Singles Chart in November 1992. To promote the song together, Kapur and Priest undertook a short tour singing live vocals over backing tracks; the first performance was in Peterborough, known for its small Afro-Caribbean and South Asian communities.

His first single for Island, "Arranged Marriage" was released in January 1993. Thousands of bootleg cassette copies of the single were seized by Island in their struggle to persuade the British Asian community, who favoured cassettes, to change formats; the label nonetheless released an official cassette edition containing extended remixes. The song was playlisted by BBC Radio 1 and numerous regional radio stations, and the radio support proved crucial to Apache Indian's breakthrough in the UK. It entered the UK charts at number 27, between Little Angels and Paul McCartney, and Steven Wells of NME noted that "In such company, Apache's ecstatic mix of bhangra, ragga and North African music burns itself into the average pop fan's brain like acid." The song ultimately peaked at number 16, where it stayed for two weeks, and the singer performed it on Top of the Pops with tabla player Pandit Dinesh. According to Sullivan, Kapur became "the first Asian on Top of the Pops in years". The song's impact on the Indian community in the UK was compared to the impact of Khaled's rai song "Didi" (1992) on France's North African community.

Although it was speculated that Island would re-establish Bob Marley's Tuff Gong label, with Kapur as its first signing, No Reservations instead saw release on Mango Records, an Island subsidiary that was known for its worldbeat releases. However, the album proved to be one of several releases, alongside Chaka Demus & Pliers' Tease Me (1993) and singles by Angelique Kidjo, that saw the label build a reputation "as an essential source for left-of-centre dance music," according to Larry Flick. The album was released in January 1993, and reached number 36 on the UK Albums Chart, staying on the chart for two weeks and becoming Kapur's only charting album. "Chok There" was re-released as the record's second official single, having already become a UK club hit. It reached number 30 in the UK in March, and was Kapur's biggest hit in Jamaica, where his music was popular on sound systems. Apache Indian's success coincided with the rise of ragga in the British mainstream, and he is credited alongside artists like Shinehead, Shaggy, Snow, Shabba Ranks, Bitty McLean, Inner Circle and Chaka Demus & Pliers for launching this development.

Apache Indian was particularly successful in India, and he capitalised on the release of No Reservations there, where it was issued by PolyGram India, with a major tour that ensured heavy media exposure and airplay, in the process became the label's first British-Asian success. He first played in the country in June 1993, at the Andheri Sports Complex in Bombay to a crowd of 17,000. Kapur reflected that upon his first visit to the country, he was "treated like a superstar", adding: "I was asked to meet the Prime Minister, which I did. I met Sonia Gandhi, Rajiv Gandhi's widow... nobody meets her. By the time I left India, they were calling me the 'Gandhi of Pop'." Within three months, the album had been certified double platinum in India, and by November, it had sold over 200,000 there. Apache Indian's celebrity was huge by this point; MTV Asia played his videos in rotation, his face adorned at least 23 billboards in Bombay, while his cultural reach spread to advertisements for butter with a slogan riffing on Kapur's stage name. As of November 1998, the album had sold over 500,000 copies in India, and it is certified triple platinum.

== Critical reception ==
Professional ratings
Review scores
Source	Rating
AllMusic	3/5 stars
Encyclopedia of Nineties Music	4/5 stars
Select	4/5 stars
Smash Hits	3/5 stars

No Reservations received acclaim from music critics. A reviewer for Music & Media called the album a "veritable feast of talent", praising its ragga beats and considering the heavy usage of sitar to make Apache Indian's roots "ever-present, making for a delightful deviation from the usual reggae formula". Penny Kiley of Liverpool Echo said that by "rooting ragga in Asian lifestyle and sounds", No Reservations pioneered an effective new style of music. David Belcher of The Herald similarly said the album's melding of "Afro-Caribbean ragga groovery" with "lilting Anglo-Asian electro bhangra and rap pungency", as well as Kapur's hybrid patois and use of irony, resulted in a "brilliant new dancefloor mode".

Anita Naik of Smash Hits complimented the catchiness, loudness and outspoken nature of the album, noting that even those who dislike club music "will subconsciously grind away to it". David Cavanagh of Select considered the "Asian ragga" album to be more "consistently good" than many general ragga albums, applauding its wide array of styles and topics and singling out "Arranged Marriage" for being the "most original" song. In their review, New Internationalist wrote that the record was a breakthrough and counted Kapur among "the most interesting manifestations of musical cross-cultures to date." While considering him to continue the lineage of Midlands-based multicultural pop from UB40 and the ska of 2 Tone Records, they felt this did not explain the whole of his appeal, admiring his self-confident, "sardonic gleam" and "effortless slide between dialects [that] comes across as an eminently sensible response to his particular street culture."

Andrew Balkin wrote a negative review for Kingston Informer, writing that although several songs feature "some great messages", "you have to understand the lyrics before you can even figure out what they are". Nonetheless, they considered the 15 track total to ensure "value for money". In a retrospective review, Ken Hunt of AllMusic felt the album was a "remarkable debut", although qualified his praise by observing how several songs had already appeared on the "Don Raja" maxi-single. In his book Back to the Miracle Factory (2003), Paul Williams wrote that the album's "charming" hybrid language exemplified how both dancehall and rap "are in some ways the rediscovery of the power of the word, that is, of the sound of the word, direct mumbo-jumbo transcending side issues like content". Although praising "the rhythm of the language, the flow of word-sounds and the very personal consciousness this rhythm/flow/story communicates", he felt the musical content was less interesting.

== Legacy ==
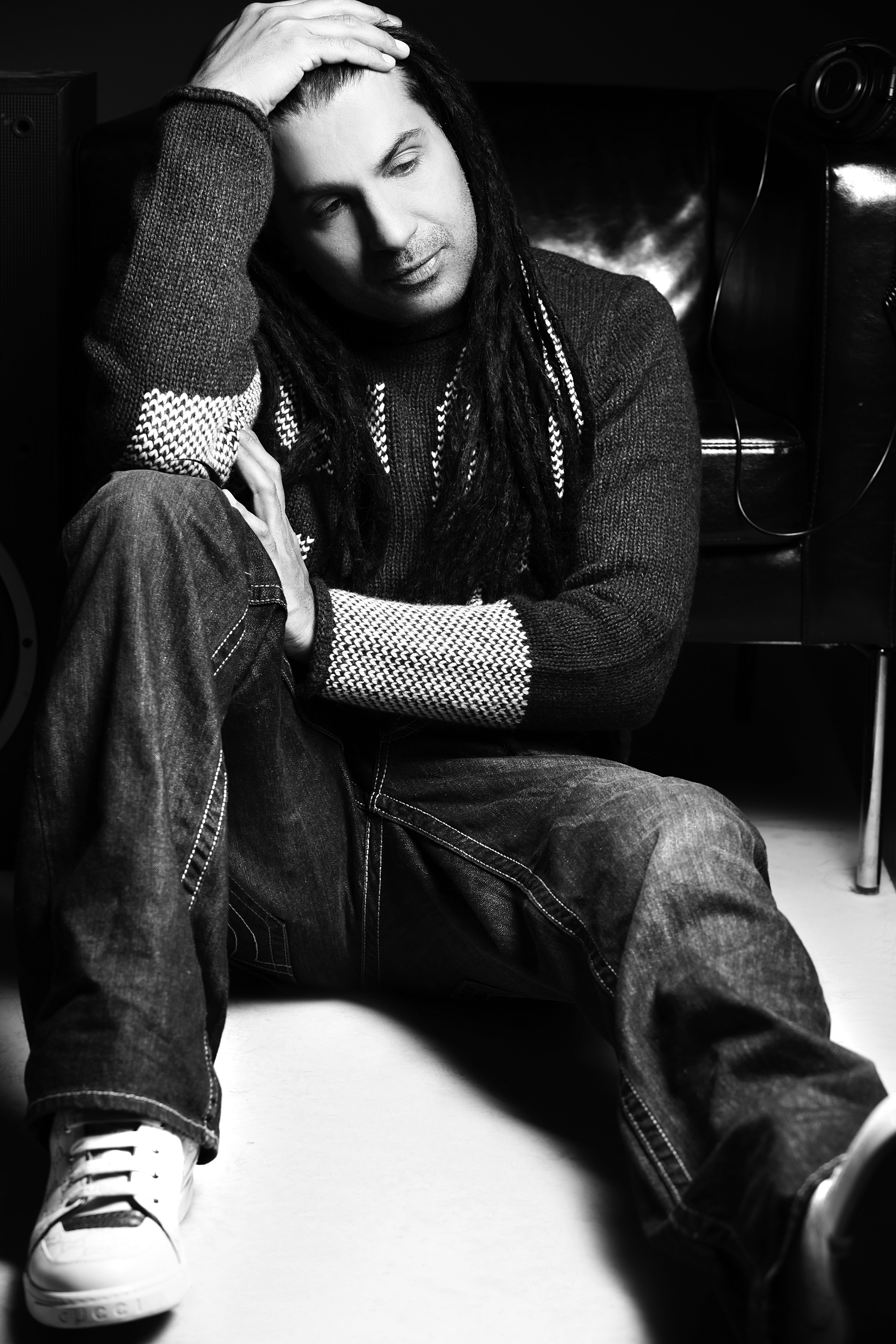
Apache Indian (pictured 2015) received a Mercury Prize nomination for No Reservations.

With the success of No Reservation and its singles, Apache Indian was described as the first pop star to hail from the UK's Asian-Indian community, with Carr crediting him for "pushing the boundaries further back" following the crossover success of UK-based Indian pop band Monsoon a decade earlier. Wells argued that, as Monsoon "were one hit-wonders" and Betty Boo and Bomb the Bass "escape the average Brit's definition of 'Asian'," Apache Indian was truly "Britain's first Asian pop star", whereas Tilley described Apache Indian as "quite possibly the first true international Asian pop star". Jonathan Kramer observed that Apache Indian's appeal varied worldwide, saying that his strong sales in Toronto were due to young Indian Canadians viewing the use of bhangra as "a respect for Indian traditions," whereas the singer had a rebel image in India, whilst in England, his music "became an important icon of unity between Afro-Caribbean and Afro-Asians".

No Reservations was nominated for the 1993 Mercury Prize for best UK album of the year. According to Sharma, the nomination "came totally out of the blue". The album drew 2-1 with Stereo MCs' Connected as second favourite to win, behind eventual winners Suede. Apache Indian received four nominations at the 1994 Brit Awards: Best British Male Solo Artist, Best British Newcomer, Best British Dance Act and Best British Single for "Boom Shack-A-Lak", the latter found on his Nuff Vibes EP, the follow-up to No Reservations which reached number five on the UK Singles Chart. According to author Rehan Hyder, the album's commercial success and Mercury Prize nomination largely increased media interest in Asian musicians.

Thom Duffy of Billboard credits No Reservations for helping bring ragga music into "the international pop mainstream". Maier said the album was innovative for making "some unprecedented musical connections", although felt its fusion of ragga and bhangra could not be expanded on. Moskowitz wrote that the record secured Apache Indian's standing and "artfully illustrated his ability to make a mark in reggae music", while Williams felt that other British-Asian youth discovered "some pride of their own" through Kapur's promotion of cultural pride on the album. As No Reservations was PolyGram India's first British-Asian success, it ensured "great potential" in India for future such crossovers; Nyay Bhushan of Billboard wrote that Kapur's success "reinforced the importance of an artist's personal effort to promote a product", a challenge the label would later face with Talvin Singh's OK (1998). The book Fusion of Cultures? (1996) highlights the album for showing how "music lends itself most easily to cross-over experimentation."

== Track listing ==
All tracks composed and arranged by Apache Indian

1. "Don Raja (Prelude)" – 0:24
2. "Chok There" – 4:25
3. "Fe Real" (featuring Maxi Priest) – 5:04
4. "Fix Up" – 4:26
5. "Aids Warning" – 4:33
6. "Guru" – 3:50
7. "Wan' No Me" – 4:09
8. "Come Follow Me" – 4:43
9. "Don't Touch" (featuring Frankie Paul) – 4:06
10. "Arranged Marriage" – 4:33
11. "Drink Problems" – 4:29
12. "Movie Over India" – 4:04
13. "Magic Carpet" – 4:01
14. "Badd Indian" – 4:33
15. "Don Raja" – 4:22

== Personnel ==
Adapted from the liner notes of No Reservations

- Apache Indian – executive production
- Trevor Wyatt – executive production
- Simon and Diamond Duggal – production (tracks 1–3, 5, 7–12, 14, 15)
- Phil Chill – production ("Fix Up"), mixing ("Arranged Marriage")
- Bobby Digital – production ("Guru")
- Sly Dunbar – production ("Magic Carpet")
- Robert Livingston – additional production ("Fix Up"), mixing ("Fix Up")
- Maxi Priest – vocals ("Fe Real")
- Frankie Paul – vocals ("Don't Touch")
- Immi Dread Cally – design, art direction
- Kate Garner – photography
