= Fashion Records =

UK-based record label

- Founded: 1980; 46 years ago
- Founder: John MacGillivray; Chris Lane
- Genre: Reggae, Roots Reggae, Jungle Music, Ragga, Dubplate, Dancehall, Digital Reggae, Dub
- Country of origin: United Kingdom
- Location: London

Fashion Records is a British independent record label, publishing reggae music.

Founded in mid 1980, Fashion Records is one of the more successful UK-based reggae labels, and one of only a few British reggae labels to release records that were produced in their own recording studio.

The label was the brainchild of John MacGillivray and Chris Lane, a couple of reggae disciples and acolytes, and was a spin-off from MacGillivray's Dub Vendor record store. The first Fashion record release reached the top of the UK reggae chart in 1980, being Dee Sharp's "Let's Dub It Up". For the next decade both British reggae musicians, and Jamaican citizens travelling in Britain were recorded by the label and these included Keith Douglas, Carlton Manning (of Carlton and The Shoes), Alton Ellis, Carlton Lewis and Johnnie Clarke amongst others.

== History ==
=== Studio opening ===
In 1982 in the basement of the new Dub Vendor store located in Clapham Junction, Fashion Records opened up a four-track studio, which was Lane's 'A-Class' dub-cutting facility upgraded. Fashion became a pivotal point for the emergence of the British MC culture and they provided an outlet for several MCs such as Papa Face, Laurel & Hardy, Pato Banton, Bionic Rhona, Macka B and Asher Senator. Paul Robinson (of One Blood) and Maxi Priest being regular patrons of the dub cutting facility, with Robinson in the guise of Barry Boom experiencing a few hit records with Fashion. Lane meanwhile supplied guitar and percussion tracks for Maxi Priest's 'Caution' band, as well as sound engineering You're Safe, Priest's 1985 debut album.

Smiley Culture had a big reggae success in 1984 on Fashion Records with his track "Cockney Translation", which was then upstaged as his follow-up "Police Officer" climbed to number 12 in the UK singles chart, causing his appearance on BBC's Top of the Pops. By the middle of the 1980s Fashion were at the heart of supporting music's move to ragga and dance-hall genres, with Barry Boom's conscious Roots and Culture dubplate, "Wicked Shall Fall" aka "Crack of the Whip," proving much in demand on the Jah Shaka sound system in UK in the mid 1980s. The studio was then able to employ both Gussie P, and later Frenchie as audio engineers, and subsequently both became producers with their own respective labels, Sip-A-Cup and Maximum Sound.

Fashion was also recording lovers rock numbers around this time from Michael Gordon and Coptic Roots chanter Nerious Joseph, who released “Sensi Crisis” ( a take on a contemporaneous Thriller U Taxi label dub for Sly & Robbie), tunes which were released on Fine Style, an imprint of Fashion. Singer Winsome had some success too with her releases "Am I The Same Girl", "Born Free" and "Super Woman" (with Tippa Irie). Another female act, Janet Lee Davis (aka Shako Lee) was a Fashion label scoop in 1990, releasing her take on Keith and Enid’s highly popular 1959 blues dance R&B tune, “Worried Over You.” Janet Lee Davis returned to the label in 2005, with her take on the Ras Michael and The Sons of Negus tune, "None A Jah Jah Children."

Fashion also worked with various Jamaican musicians, including Junior Delgado, Joseph Cotton ("No Touch The Style"), Alton Ellis, Leroy Gibbons,Carlton and The Shoes, Frankie Paul, Little John (musician), Delroy Wilson, Al Campbell, "God's Son" Glen Brown and Augustus Pablo.

=== New studio ===
By 1988, the label had developed enough to afford to open a new 16 track set up at A-Class Studio in Forest Hill, London. The following two years brought further reggae chart success for Fashion Records signings with Janet Lee Davis ("Two Timing Lover") and Cutty Ranks ("The Stopper") both hitting number one. A cross-over on to the UK singles chart was Louchie Lou & Michie One's cover of the Isley Brothers', "Shout", which was licensed to London Records. General Levy's output was also leased to London.

=== 1990s ===
Fashion continued with UK reggae chart hits plus successful releases in both Jamaica and the US. Their artists by then included Peter Hunnigale, Sanchez, General Degree, Cutty Ranks and Janet Lee Davis. They also supplied the vocals to the UK garage hit "RipGroove" (Double 99 featuring Top Cat). The studio was also busy with production projects for other companies, and amongst other artists who recorded with Fashion were Michie One & Louchie Lou ("The Crickets Sing for Ana Maria"), Sayoko ("Sistren" with Michie One & Louchie Lou), and Phillip Leo ("Summer Girl" with Glamma Kid).

In early 1997, the A-Class Studio was again relocated and completely rebuilt, and the label was soon busy again working on new singles and albums with Janet Lee Davis, Starkey Banton, Alton Ellis, The Dub Organiser, Neville Morrison, Ras Harry Chapman, Mykal Roze, and Sandeeno. The album Starkey Banton Meets The Dub Organiser, Powers Youth was a breakthrough on the UK roots scene of the late 90's, experimenting with the new technology of the time to weave in structures and techniques from classical 70s roots albums, fusing them with contemporary digital beats out of London to create fresh sounds, an example being their take on Black Uhuru's "I Love King Selassie I", which, in contrapuntal motion, merges Michael Rose's vocal melody from the original tune with the bassline from "Natural Mystic." A contemporaneous parallel example of such experimentation from the same year (1997) was Soul II Soul Daddae Harvey’s release with Joey "Words, Sounds & Power" Jay ( of Great Tribulation sound ), the album I n I Deal With Roots.

=== 2000s ===
From 2000 the label became inactive and no new projects were undertaken; however, there were plans for a re-release schedule which will make much of Fashion's back catalogue available again. The first albums were released on 19 March through Believe Digital. This included nine Fashion albums and a new compilation album Fashion in Finestyle – Significant Hits Volume One. The relaunch saw articles appearing in Dummy Mag, Echoes, The Wire and United Reggae. MacGillivray and Lane appeared on David Rodigan's radio show on Kiss FM to talk about the relaunch and to play some of their favourite Fashion tracks.

=== Remixes ===
In April 2012, an exclusive limited edition 12" from Nice Up! Records was released called "Inna Nice Up!" The track listing included "Who's Gonna Make The Dance Ram" (Serial Killaz remix) and "Nice Up The Session" (Dub Pistols remix).

== Labels ==
Various labels were owned by Fashion Records:

- Fine Style
- Top Notch
- Arthur Daley International
- Rubble Music
- Hi-Fashion
- Dub Organiser

== Other sources ==
- The Rough Guide to Reggae, Rough Guides, 1997, First edition, p. 348, ISBN 978-1858282473
