= Apache Indian (musician) =

British singer-songwriter and reggae DJ (born 1967)

Apache Indian BEM
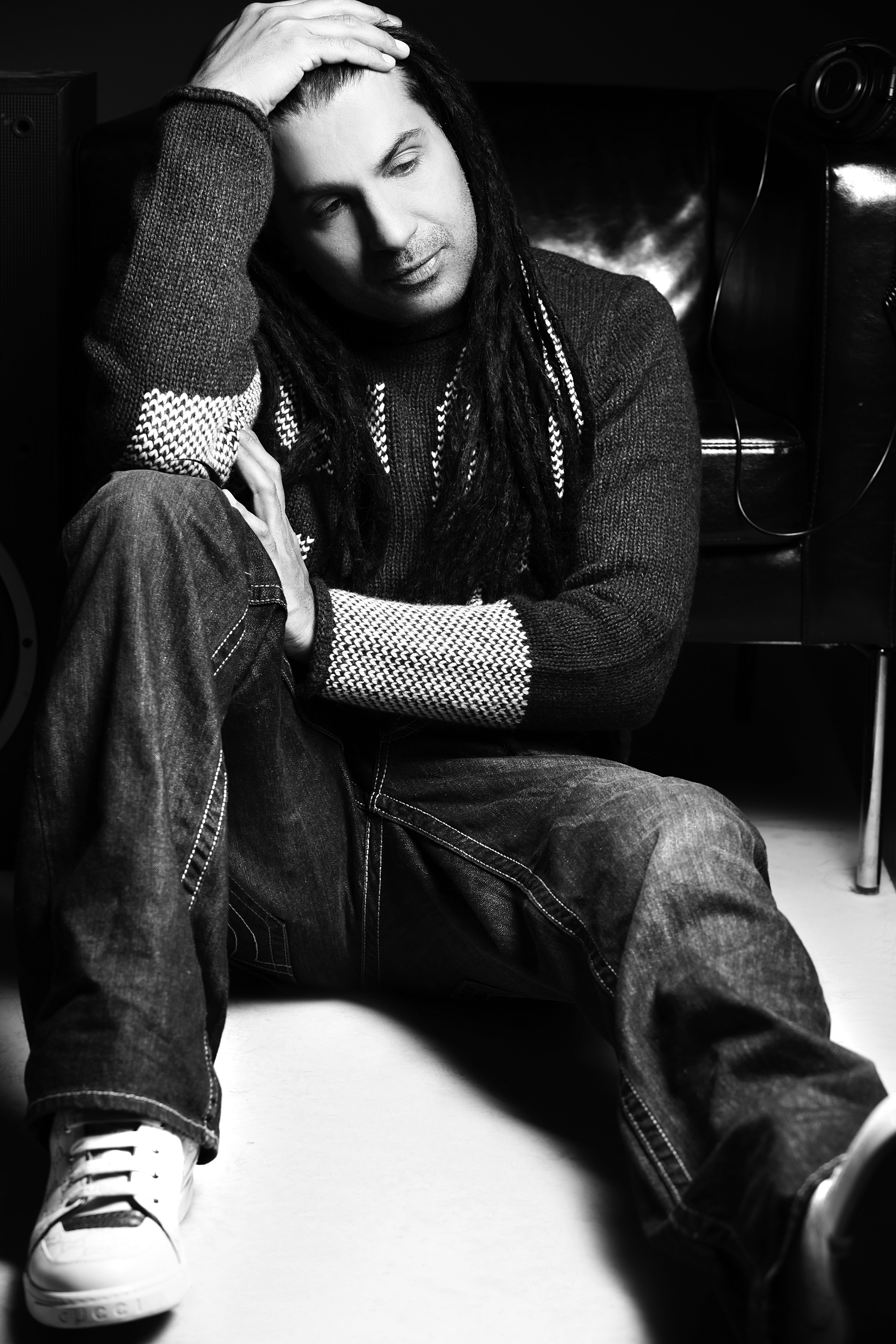
- Kapur in 2015

Background information
- Born: Steven Kapur; 11 May 1967 (age 58); Handsworth, Birmingham, England
- Genres: Bhangramuffin; reggae fusion; Eurodance
- Occupations: Singer; songwriter
- Instruments: Vocals
- Years active: 1980–present
- Labels: Island; PolyGram; Universal Music

Steven Kapur BEM (born 11 May 1967), known by the stage name Apache Indian, is a British singer-songwriter and reggae DJ, who had a series of hits during the 1990s. He is best known for the 1993 song "Boom Shack-A-Lak".

== Life and career ==
Born into a family of Punjabi Indians, Kapur was raised in Handsworth, Birmingham, a racially mixed area with large Black and Asian communities, and home of reggae bands such as Steel Pulse. By the early 1980s, he was working with local sound systems and grew dreadlocks. By the mid-1980s, he had begun to make a name for himself as a dancehall deejay. Kapur recorded his first single in 1990, "Movie Over India", under the moniker Apache Indian, and it was picked up by the reggae distributor Jet Star. The track mixed ragga and bhangra sounds and was popular among audiences of both genres. Two further singles followed in a similar vein, "Chok There" and "Don Raja", bringing him to the attention of major labels, and in 1992, he signed with Island Records.

With the collaboration of his cousins Simon & Diamond, Kapur introduced a new hybrid sound of bhangra called bhangragga, or bhangramuffin, with his 1993 debut album, No Reservations, recorded in Jamaica and produced by Simon & Diamond, Phil Chill, Robert Livingston, Bobby Digital, and Sly Dunbar. This was followed by Make Way for the Indian (produced by Sly & Robbie, the Press, Mafia & Fluxy, Pandit Dineysh, and Chris Lane), which featured rapper Tim Dog and spawned the hit "Boom Shack-A-Lak". By 1997, Kapur had parted ways with Island, and his next album, Real People, was released by Warner Bros. Sweden.

His single "Om Namaha Shivaya" is included on the 2004 Putumayo World Music compilation album World Reggae, a collection of reggae tracks performed by artists from around the world.

In 2013, he sang a song on the soundtrack of the Indian film Iddarammayilatho. That year, he released the album It Is What It Is through Universal India. Its first single, "Celebrate", was a collaboration with Canadian pop singer Raghav and producer Jim Beanz.

In 2018, Kapur co-hosted the Brit Asia TV Music Awards with Preeya Kalidas.

Kapur performed during the closing ceremony for the 2022 Commonwealth Games in Birmingham.

== Apache Indian Music Academy ==
In November 2013, Kapur opened the Apache Indian Music Academy at South and City College, in his hometown of Handsworth.

== Accolades ==
Apache Indian was nominated for an Ivor Novello Award for best contemporary song for "Arranged Marriage" as well as for a Mercury Music Prize for his debut album, No Reservations, in 1993. He was also nominated for the Central Britain Media and Arts Asian Jewel Award in 2004. He received an award at the Asian Media Awards for his talk show Real Talk in 2013, and a year later, he was decorated with the event's Lifetime Achievement Award. In 2021, he was awarded the British Empire Medal for services to music and young people.

=== Awards ===
- British Reggae Industry Awards – Best Newcomer (1990)
- UK Asian Music Awards – Best International Success (2003)
- UK Asian Music Awards – Outstanding Achievement (2005)
- UK Asian Music Awards – Lifetime Achievement Award (2011)
- Brit Asia TV Music Awards – Lifetime Achievement Award (2014)
- 2021 New Year Honours – British Empire Medal for services to music and to young people (2021)

== Discography ==
Apache Indian has sold over 11 million albums worldwide.

=== Studio albums ===
Year	Album	Label	UK
1993	No Reservations	Island Records	36
1995	Make Way for the Indian	Island/Universal Music	—
1996	No Problem	Love Birds	—
1997	Real People / Wild East	Warners Sweden/Sunset Records	—
2000	Karma	Sunset Records	—
2005	Time for Change	Explorer Recording Company	—
2007	Sadhu – The Movement	Smash Records	—
2013	It Is What It Is	Universal Music India/Sunset Entertainment Group	—
2017	In Ja...	Sunset/Universal India	—
2018	On the Weekend	Sunset Entertainment Group	—
2020	What's Not to Love	Sunset Entertainment Group	—
"—" denotes releases that did not chart.

=== EPs ===
Year	Album	Certifications
1993	Nuff Vibes	BPI: Silver
2012	Home Run	
2016	Apache Indian	

=== Singles ===
Year	Single	Peak positions								Certifications	Album
Year	Single	UK	IRE	NED	BEL (FLA)	GER	AUT	AUS	NZ	Certifications	Album
1991	"Movie Over India"	—	—	—	—	—	—	—	—		No Reservations
1991	"Chok There"	—	—	—	—	—	—	—	—		No Reservations
1992	"Don Raja"	—	—	—	—	—	—	—	—		No Reservations
1992	"Arranged Marriage"	16	—	—	—	—	—	—	—		No Reservations
1992	"Fe' Real" (with Maxi Priest)	33	—	—	—	—	—	—	—		Fe Real
1993	"Chok There" (reissue)	30	—	—	—	—	—	—	—		No Reservations
1993	"Boom Shack-A-Lak"	5	8	10	24	32	13	34	19		Nuff Vibes
1993	"Movin' On" (charity single)	48	—	—	—	—	—	—	—		non-album single
1994	"Wreckx Shop" (with Wreckx-n-Effect)	26	—	—	—	—	—	—	—		Hard or Smooth
1995	"Make Way for the Indian" (with Tim Dog)	29	—	—	—	—	—	—	—		Make Way for the Indian
1995	"Raggamuffin Girl" (with Frankie Paul)	31	—	—	—	—	—	—	—		Make Way for the Indian
1997	"Lovin' (Let Me Love You)"	53	—	—	—	—	—	—	—		Real People
1997	"Real People"	66	—	—	—	—	—	—	—		Real People
2005	"Om Numah Shivaya" (tsunami charity single)	—	—	—	—	—	—	—	—		Time for Change
2005	"The Israelites" (with Desmond Dekker)	—	—	—	—	—	34	—	—		Time for Change
"—" denotes releases that did not chart or were not released.
