= Laurel and Hardy (disambiguation) =

Laurel and Hardy refers to the comedy film duo. It may also refer to:

- Laurel and Hardy filmography
- Laurel and Hardy (TV series)
- Laurel and Hardy music
- Laurel and Hardy (play)
- The All New Adventures of Laurel & Hardy in For Love or Mummy
- Laurel & Hardy (reggae)
- The Laurel-Hardy Murder Case
