= Origene =

Australian electronic dance band

- Origin: Melbourne, Victoria, Australia
- Genres: Electronic; dance
- Years active: 2002–2005
- Labels: 2Q; Ministry of Sound; Tommy Boy Silver; Bandung; Armada
- Past members: Brian Canham; Ben Grayson; Matilda White

Origene were an Australian electronic and dance music group formed in 2002 by Brian Canham (of Pseudo Echo) on keyboards, Ben Grayson (of the Bamboos) on keyboards, computers and Matilda White on lead vocals. Their debut single, "Suddenly, Silently" (March 2002) reached No. 51 on the ARIA singles chart. Canham and Grayson also produced the group's work. Their second single, "Sanctuary" (August 2002), reached No. 13 on Billboard's Dance Radio Airplay chart in 2004.

== History ==
Brian Canham of Pseudo Echo had met Ben Grayson at a nightclub in Melbourne in the late 1990s. Grayson had learnt jazz and classical piano; he ran his own recording studio and developed associated computer technology. Canham is Pseudo Echo's founding mainstay lead singer and main songwriter; during their hiatuses his side projects included dance/pop music groups and producing other artists. Grayson, on keyboards, joined Pseudo Echo in late 1999; he was a founding organist of funk music group, the Bamboos in 2000.

Canham and Grayson began writing ambient music as a side project, Origene. They were joined by Matilda White on lead vocals by 2002. Canham named the group, Origene, in homage to Jean-Michel Jarre's "Oxygène (Part IV)" (January 1977). Origene's debut single, "Suddenly, Silently" was issued in March 2002, which peaked at No. 51 on the ARIA singles chart. The group were signed with Ministry of Sound, which included that track on their compilation, Club Nation America (September 2002).

Their second single, "Sanctuary" (August 2002) appeared in the ARIA Club, Dance and Hitseekers charts. It was issued as their first international single in 2004, which peaked on Billboard's component chart: Dance Radio Airplay, at No. 13. Their third single, released in 2003, is a cover version of Maxi Priest's "Close to You". "Design", their fourth and final single, appeared in 2005. As well as working with Origene, Canham performed with Pseudo Echo and Grayson continued with the Bamboos.
