= No Reservations =

No Reservations may refer to:

- Anthony Bourdain: No Reservations, a television series hosted by Anthony Bourdain
  - No Reservations: Around the World on an Empty Stomach, a 2007 book by Anthony Bourdain based on his TV series
- No Reservations (film), a 2007 film starring Catherine Zeta-Jones and Aaron Eckhart
- No Reservations (Blackfoot album), 1975
- No Reservations (Apache Indian album), 1993
