= Make Way for the Indian =

Studio album by Apache Indian
- Released: 1995
- Genre: Reggae, bhangra
- Label: Island

Apache Indian chronology
No Reservations (1993)	Make Way for the Indian (1995)	Real People (1997)

Make Way for the Indian is an album by the English musician Apache Indian, released in 1995.

The title track peaked at No. 29 on the UK Singles Chart. "Boomshackalak" was a hit in the United States.

== Production ==
The album was produced in part by Mafia & Fluxy. "Armagideon Time" is a cover of the Willie Williams song; "Born for a Purpose" was originally by Dr Alimantado. Frankie Paul, Sly and Robbie, and Tim Dog contributed to the album. Apache Indian chose to produce a sound more rooted in reggae than in bhangra.

== Critical reception ==
Professional ratings
Review scores
Source	Rating
AllMusic	4.5/5 stars
The Encyclopedia of Popular Music	3/5 stars
MusicHound World: The Essential Album Guide	3/5 stars
Select	3/5 medals

Trouser Press wrote that "Apache uses a more folkloric bhangra sound with his dancehall and adds elements of roots reggae, jungle, hip-hop, R&B, rock steady and rock." The Independent called the album "a more diversely accessible set than his debut [that] finds Apache coming close to jungle on 'Who Say?'" The Times considered it to be "fresh, strong and entirely credible... Indian's gruff growl really comes into its own on 'Born for a Purpose', a rumbling reggae groove freighted with a hard-hitting declamation of self-belief that gradually mutates into a wickedly soulful chorus."

The Guardian determined that "accessibility remains paramount ... and clearly contributed to the muddled musical identity evident here." The Washington Informer thought that "this Indian West Indian brother has a smooth dancehall sound that is as refreshing as a cool Ginger Beer." The Orange County Register deemed the album "a stylish mix of reggae, hip-hop and Indian lyrical consciousness, especially on the title track and 'Ansa Dat'."

AllMusic wrote that "'Boba' is one of the most explicitly bhangra-based songs he has recorded, and it's one of the best things on the album."

== Track listing ==
No.	Title	Length
1.	"Make Way for the Indian"
2.	"Armagideon Time"
3.	"Boba"
4.	"Raggamuffin Girl"
5.	"I Pray"
6.	"Ansa Dat"
7.	"Born for a Purpose"
8.	"Back Up"
9.	"Right There"
10.	"Who Say?"
11.	"Boomshackalak"
