= Smiley Culture =

British reggae singer and DJ (1963–2011)

- Mid-1980s publicity photo
- Born: David Victor Emmanuel; 10 February 1963; South London, England
- Died: 15 March 2011 (aged 48); Warlingham, Surrey, England
- Cause of death: Suicide by stabbing
- Occupations: Singer, deejay, television presenter
- Musical career
- Genres: Reggae, dancehall
- Instrument: Vocals
- Years active: Late 1970s–early 1990s
- Labels: Fashion, Polydor

David Victor Emmanuel (10 February 1963 – 15 March 2011), better known as Smiley Culture, was a British reggae singer and DJ known for his "fast chat" style. During a relatively brief period of fame and success, he produced two of the most critically acclaimed reggae singles of the 1980s. He died on 15 March 2011, aged 48, during a police raid on his home. An inquest found that his death was a suicide. Campaigners and his family have expressed scepticism about the official verdict and the police version of events.

== Biography ==
Emmanuel was raised in Stockwell, south London, the son of a Jamaican father and Guyanese mother. He was educated at Tulse Hill School. His "Smiley" nickname was gained due to his method of chatting up girls at school – he would ask them for a smile. Prior to his recording career he worked as a DJ with many of London's reggae sound systems, most often with the Saxon Studio International system, where he met and worked with a number of other reggae artists, including Maxi Priest, Papa Levi and Tippa Irie.

Signed to the London-based reggae record label Fashion Records, his first single "Cockney Translation" (1984) was a Jamaican's guide to the East End dialect: "Cockneys have names like Terry, Arfur and Del Boy/We have names like Winston, Lloyd and Leroy". The song mixed cockney dialect with London's version of Jamaican patois, translating between the two. Simon Reynolds has often cited this song in his writings, arguing that it presaged the creation of a new hybrid accent in which white South Londoners would adopt many terms of black origin. The song's lyric was later used in schools as an example of how immigration has affected the English language. Smiley Culture popularised the "fast chat" style of deejaying that had originated with Jamaican deejays such as Ranking Joe, and was developed further by British toasters, particularly those on the Saxon sound system such as Peter King.

Emmanuel had chart success with his next single, "Police Officer", released towards the end of 1984. This was the supposedly autobiographical tale of how Emmanuel was arrested for the possession of cannabis, but then let off in return for an autograph when the policeman recognised him as a famous reggae artist. In spite of the subject matter – and possibly because mid-1980s radio station bosses in the UK did not understand the terms "ganja" and "sinsemilla" – the single was a Top 20 hit, selling 160,000 copies, and earned Emmanuel two appearances on BBC's flagship music programme, Top of the Pops. The record, although humorous, did have a serious aspect, in that it highlighted the way black people are unfairly treated by the police. He recorded a session for Janice Long's BBC Radio 1 show in December 1984, and was featured on the covers of Echoes, Record Mirror, and the NME in early 1985. The success of "Police Officer" prompted a re-release of "Cockney Translation". It picked up considerable airplay on BBC Radio One and sold over 40,000 copies in total, but only reached the lower end of the UK Singles Chart. His success led to an appearance at the Reggae Sunsplash festival in Jamaica in 1985.

After this he signed to major label Polydor, but his work for them – including the album Tongue in Cheek, and the accompanying single "Schooltime Chronicle" – did not replicate the chart success of "Police Officer". He also hosted the Channel 4 television show Club Mix in 1986 and 1987.

In 1986, Emmanuel made a cameo appearance in the film Absolute Beginners. He also featured in a television advertising campaign for "on line" accounts by NatWest in 1986.

Culture has been identified as a major influence by later black British musicians such as DJ Luck and MC Neat, and Roots Manuva, the latter describing him as a "Britrap pioneer". "Cockney Translation" was one of the choices of novelist and poet Michael Rosen when he appeared on BBC Radio 4's Desert Island Discs.

In 2010, Emmanuel told The Guardian that after his career in music he began investing in diamond mining, and by 2010 had gold and diamond mine concessions in several countries including Ghana, Uganda, Liberia, Kenya, and the Congo.

== Arrest ==
After being arrested in July 2010, he was charged with conspiracy to supply cocaine, and on 28 September he appeared at Croydon Magistrates' Court in London. His trial was due to begin on 21 March 2011.

== Death ==
On 15 March 2011, Emmanuel died from a self-inflicted stab wound, while the police were searching his house on Hillbury Road Warlingham, Surrey. His death came an hour and a half after officers arrived with a search warrant relating to the import of Class A drugs into the UK. A post-mortem examination revealed that he had died from a single stab wound to the heart. He is survived by his mother, son, daughter, sister and three brothers.

His death was investigated by the Independent Police Complaints Commission. In their final report – which at the request of the coroner was neither made public nor made available to Emmanuel's family – the IPCC concluded that there was no evidence justifying the pressing of criminal charges against any of the four officers present at the house during the raid. In the IPCC statement following the inquest – which returned a verdict of suicide – it was stated that there was neither criminal conduct by officers, nor individual failings by officers that might amount to misconduct. Nonetheless, the report also pointed out flaws in the police raid and called on the Metropolitan Police Service to improve the planning and execution of their drug seizures.

However, Emmanuel's family raised concerns about the investigation, claiming that the IPCC "had let [them] down" and that many "unanswered questions" remained. The conditions surrounding his death and the subsequent investigation were also questioned by members of the general public, his death often being considered in the context of police brutality and other black people dying in police custody. A study into the causes and consequences of the 2011 United Kingdom riots, led by the London School of Economics in collaboration with the British newspaper The Guardian, identified Emmanuel's death, perceived by some as a prominent case of police abuse, as a contributing factor to the riots.

== Discography ==
=== Albums ===
- Tongue in Cheek (1986), Polydor
- The Original Smiley Culture (1986), Top Notch

Contributing artist

- The Rough Guide to Reggae (1997), World Music Network

=== Singles ===
- "Cockney Translation" (1984), Arthur Daley International/Fashion
- "Police Officer" (1984), Fashion – UK No. 12
- "Cockney Translation" (re-issue) (1985), Fashion – UK No. 71
- "Schooltime Chronicle" (1986), Polydor – UK No. 59
- "Mr. Kidnapper" (1986), Polydor
- "So What" (1986), Boiling Point – promo only
- "Noff Personality" (1986), Culture
- "TV Lover", Senator
- "Can't Stop the Rap" (1990), SBK/Capitol

== See also ==
- List of reggae musicians
- List of Polydor Records artists
- List of performers on Top of the Pops
