= Island Reggae Greats =

Advertisement for the album

This article is part of the Island Records discography.

Island Reggae Greats is a series of reggae compilation albums, released by Island Records in 1985. The series showcases selected Island reggae artists and three reggae styles (DJ, lovers, and rockers), plus there was also a sampler featuring selected tracks from the series. The albums were compiled by Trevor Wyatt, contain extensive liner notes, and the covers were painted by artists based on photos.

The series, initially offered at a "special price," was intended to create new interest in reggae. It saw a CD release in the late '80s and early '90s as part of the Island Masters and Reggae Refreshers series.

In America the series was released on Island's subsidiary label Mango, and some of the titles were released with different covers.

== Discography ==
=== Island Reggae Greats ===
Toots & the Maytals

- LP: Island IRG 1 (UK); Mango MLPS 9781 (US); Island 207131 (Germany)
- CD: Island Masters IMCD 38 (UK); Mango CIDRG 1 (UK); Mango 539 781-2 (US)

Gregory Isaacs Live

- LP: Island IRG 2 (UK); Island 207 132 (Germany)

Steel Pulse

- LP: Island IRG 3 (UK); Mango MLPS 9783 (US); Island 207133 (Germany)
- CD: Island Masters IMCD 14 (UK); Island 207132 (Germany)

various artists and DJs

- LP: Island IRG 4 (UK); Island 207134 (Germany)

Burning Spear

- LP: Island IRG 5 (UK); Island 207135 (Germany)

Linton Kwesi Johnson

- LP: Island IRG 6 (UK); Island 207136 (Germany)
- CD: Island Masters IMCD 14/824 693-2 (UK)

Sly & Robbie A Dub Experience

- LP: Island IRG 7 (UK); Island 207137 (Germany)

various artists Strictly For Lovers

- LP: Island IRG 8 (UK); Island 207138 (Germany)

Third World

- LP: Island IRG 9 (UK); Island 207139 (Germany)
- CD: Island Masters IMCD 36 (UK)

Pablo Moses

- LP: Island IRG 10 (UK)

Jacob Miller & Inner Circle

- LP: Island IRG 11 (UK); Island 207141 (Germany)
- CD: Mango CIDRG 11 (UK)

Lee "Scratch" Perry

- LP: Island IRG 12 (UK); Simply Vinyl SVLP 190 (UK, reissue); Island 207142 (Germany); Island 210855 (Germany, reissue)
- CD: Island RRCD 10 (UK)

Black Uhuru

- LP: Island IRG 13 (UK); Island 207143 (Germany)
- CD: Island Masters IMCD 3 (UK)

Jimmy Cliff

- LP: Island IRG 14 (UK); Mango MLPS 9787 (US) Island 207144 (Germany)
- CD: Mango 539794-2 (US); Spectrum 554459-2 (UK, reissue)

The Wailers

- LP: Island IRG 15 (UK); Island 207145 (Germany)

various artists Strictly For Rockers

- LP: Island IRG 16 (UK); Island 207 146 (Germany)

various artists Island Reggae Greats

- A selection of tracks from the series.
- LP: Island IRGS 1 (UK)

various artists The Greatest Of Reggae Greats

- A selection of tracks from the series.
- LP: Island ISP 2-1036

=== Island Reggae Greats Collection ===
The latest reissue of the series, which rebranded it Island Reggae Greats Collection, was in 1997 on Universal's UK budget label Spectrum. The cover art was slightly reworked, and the liner notes either altered or omitted. Also, Aswad were added to the series, while the Pablo Moses, the Wailers, and the various artist albums were deleted.

== See also ==
- List of record labels
