= Dee Sharp =

- Born: Derrick Trought; 1956 (age 68–69)
- Genres: Reggae, lovers rock, soul
- Instrument: Vocals
- Years active: 1980–present
- Labels: Fashion, RCA
- Website: deesharpdotorg.wordpress.com

Derrick Trought (born 1956), better known as Dee Sharp, is a British lovers rock singer who began his recording career in 1980, also joining Buzzz as lead singer for a time.

== Biography ==
Sharp was born Derrick Trought in London in 1956.

Sharp's debut single, a version of Leo Hall's "Let's Dub It Up", released in 1980, was the first release by Fashion Records, and topped the reggae charts in the UK. He followed this with "Swing and Dine"/"Follow Your Heart", which was also successful, and Sharp became established as one of the leading artists of the British lovers rock scene.

In 1981 he joined the Brit funk group Buzzz as lead singer, the band signing to RCA Records and appearing on the BBC television show Ebony. The group were moderately successful and Sharp was the cover star for the 31 July 1982 issue of Melody Maker. Sharp left the band in 1982 and resumed his solo career, having further local reggae hits in 1983 with "Rising to the Top" and "Give It All You've Got".

In 1984 he contributed a rap to Nick Heyward's song "Warning Sign", performing with Heyward on Top of the Pops.

He continued to record and perform both reggae and soul into the 1990s.

== Discography ==
=== Singles ===
- "Let's Dub It Up" (1980), Fashion
- "Swing and Dine"/"Follow Your Heart" (1980), Fashion
- "Magician" (1983), RCA
- "Take Your Time"
- "Straighten Up and Fly Right" (1983), RCA
- "Rising to the Top" (1983), Fashion
- "Give It All You've Got" (1983)
- "Moon Dance" (1987), Syncopate
