= Dub Vendor =

Dub Vendor is a long-standing, and pioneering, London-based vendor of ska and reggae music. In 2006, Time Out termed it "the best source of Jamaican music in Europe".

== History ==
Founded by John MacGillivray and Chris Lane, Dub Vendor began life in 1976 as a market stall in London's Clapham Junction in response to the considerable lack of West Indian music at the time. Clapham Junction at that time was a poor inner city suburb, and the surging population of immigrants from the West Indies made Battersea and nearby Brixton their new homes. The stall – and the shop that followed – were instant successes, and the second Dub Vendor store (or 'record shack' as it's known) opened four years later in Ladbroke Grove right next to the Underground station.

In response to London's reggae scene flourishing in the early 1980s, larger premises were required to cater for the increasing demand for reggae, ska, and allied genres. Subsequently, 274 Lavender Hill became Dub Vendor's flagship store, and also the home of its home-brew recording studio label Fashion Records.

The Ladbroke Grove shack continued to operate alongside the Lavender Hill store until 1991, when it was moved down the road to 150 Ladbroke Grove, due to the lack of space in the shack to accommodate the ever-increasing patronage. The future for the Ladbroke Grove branch began to look bleak, however, as sales fell and the rent increased. The final nail in the coffin came in 2007 in the form of the introduction of the Western Extension of London's congestion charge, which resulted in the store closing its doors to the public just over a year later on 28 June 2008.

The Ladbroke Grove shack in October 2007

In September 2011, following the riots which took place in London the previous month, MacGillivray announced that the Lavender Hill store was closing down, and that Dub Vendor would exist solely as an online and mail order business.

== See also ==
- Fashion Records
