= Maxi (album) =

Studio album by Maxi Priest
- Released: 11 December 1987
- Recorded: 1987
- Genre: Reggae; soul
- Label: 10 Records; Virgin
- Producer: Robbie Shakespeare; Sly Dunbar; Willie Lindo

Maxi Priest chronology
Intentions (1986)	Maxi (1987)	Bonafide (1990)

Alternative cover
- Cover for the US and Canada release of the album, titled Maxi Priest

Singles from Maxi
- 1. "Some Guys Have All the Luck" Released: 1987; 2. "How Can We Ease the Pain?" Released: 1988; 3. "Wild World" Released: 1988; 4. "Goodbye to Love Again" Released: 1988

Maxi (released as Maxi Priest in the United States and Canada) is the third studio album by English reggae vocalist Maxi Priest, released in 1987. It contains the singles "Some Guys Have All the Luck", "How Can We Ease the Pain?", "Wild World" and "Goodbye to Love Again".

== Critical reception ==
Professional ratings
Review scores
Source	Rating
AllMusic	4/5 stars
Melody Maker	(unfavourable)
New Musical Express	7/10

Spin wrote, "Maxi shows that when left lonely by a lover, he's not too macho to shed a tear about it. He captures love's joys just as convincingly. Maxi is the sweet fruit from a branch of reggae that’s breaking barriers to top the Pops."

== Track listing ==
=== International version (Maxi) ===
No.	Title	Writer(s)	Length
1.	"Wild World"	Cat Stevens	3:38
2.	"Suzie – You Are"	Jean-Paul Maunick; Max Elliott; Ray Simpson	3:46
3.	"Goodbye to Love Again"	Glynne Jones	4:30
4.	"You're Only Human"	Elliott; Phillip Linton	4:00
5.	"Same Old Story"	Elliott; Simpson	4:04
6.	"Marcus"	Simpson	5:45
7.	"How Can We Ease the Pain?" (featuring Beres Hammond)	Elliott; Simpson	4:08
8.	"It Ain't Easy"	Marquis Birch; Paget King; Ric Harris; Robbie Ellington	4:09
9.	"Some Guys Have All the Luck"	Jeff Fortgang	5:41
10.	"Problems"	Elliott; Paul Robinson	4:30
11.	"Reasons"	Charles Stepney; Maurice White; Philip Bailey	3:49

=== US and Canada version (Maxi Priest) ===
No.	Title	Writer(s)	Length
1.	"Wild World" (Remix)	Stevens	3:38
2.	"Suzie – You Are"	Maunick; Elliott; Simpson	3:46
3.	"Goodbye to Love Again"	Jones	4:30
4.	"Problems"	Elliott; Robinson	4:00
5.	"Same Old Story"	Elliott; Simpson	4:04
6.	"Marcus"	Simpson	5:45
7.	"How Can We Ease the Pain?"	Elliott; Simpson	4:08
8.	"It Ain't Easy"	Birch; King; Harris; Ellington	4:08
9.	"Some Guys Have All the Luck"	Fortgang	5:39

== Personnel ==
=== Musicians ===
- Maxi Priest – vocals, backing vocals
- Duncan Bridgeman – keyboards
- Robbie Lyn – keyboards
- Willie Lindo – guitars
- Robbie Shakespeare – guitars, bass, backing vocals
- Lloyd Sparks – bass
- Sly Dunbar – drums, drum programming
- Dean Fraser – horns, backing vocals
- Ronald "Nambo" Robinson – horns
- David Madden – horns
- Pam Hall – backing vocals
- J.C. Lodge – backing vocals
- Beres Hammond – vocals (7)

=== Production ===
- Sly Dunbar – producer (1–9)
- Willie Lindo – producer (1–9)
- Robbie Shakespeare – producer (1–9)
- Godwin Logie – producer (10)
- Michael "Reuben" Campbell – producer (11)
- David Roe – engineer (1–9)
- Erskine Thompson – project coordinator
- Stylorouge – sleeve design
- Peter Ashworth – cover photography
- Simon Fowler – all other photography
- Level Vibes Ltd. – management

== Charts ==
Chart performance for Maxi

Chart (1987–1988)	Peak position
Australian Albums (ARIA)	67
UK Albums (OCC)	25

Chart performance for Maxi Priest

Chart (1989)	Peak position
US Billboard 200	108

== Certifications ==
Region	Certification	Certified units/sales
United Kingdom (BPI)	Gold	100,000^{^}
^{^} Shipments figures based on certification alone.
