= Starkey Banton =

- Born: David Murray; November 15, 1962 (age 63)
- Origin: Hammersmith, London, England
- Genres: Reggae
- Years active: Mid-1970s–present
- Labels: Fashion, Ariwa

Starkey Banton aka Starkey Super (born David Murray, 15 November 1962) is a British reggae deejay known for his "cultural" lyrics, active since the mid-1970s.

== Biography ==
Born in Hammersmith, London, in 1962, Murray began performing in the mid-1970s under the name Starkey Super on the London sound system circuit. He changed his stage name to Starkey Banton ("Banton" meaning a deejay full of lyrics) in response to the popularity of several other performers using the Banton name. His debut single, "Lover Dread", was released in 1993, bucking the trend for slackness. This was followed by "Blackman Memories" and "Ganja Baby". In 1994 he worked with the One Love crew, who released his "Wicked Man" single, the popularity of which led to combination hits with Sweetie Irie and Horace Andy, and an appearance at the 1995 Reggae Sunsplash festival.Alongside Don Campbell (musician) on the vocals, Banton also cut Its A Roadblock, with Undivided Roots, Tony Ruff Cutt Philips, and Lloydie Crucial in 1994.

His 1995 riposte to the Jungle music phenomenon, "Jungle Bungle" ("One bag a noise and a whole heap a sample, That's something my ear holes can't handle!"), was hugely popular among Britain's urban audience. He recorded for Fashion Records, releasing "Nah Wear Nuh Versace", coincidentally released on the day Gianni Versace was murdered, followed by a string of cultural singles with "I Love King Selassie I", "I & I Saw Them Coming", and "Weeping & Wailing", collected together along with the dub sides and new material on his debut album, Powers Youth, in 1997.The album featured Mykal Rose, with whom Banton recorded combination tracks "Release Me" and "Another Day in Babywrong". The album Starkey Banton Meets The Dub Organiser, Powers Youth was a breakthrough on the UK roots scene of the late 90's, experimenting with the new technology of the time to weave in structures and techniques from classical 70s roots albums, fusing them with contemporary digital beats out of London to create fresh sounds, an example being their take on Black Uhuru's "I Love King Selassie I", which, in contrapuntal motion, merges Michael Rose's vocal melody from the original tune with the bassline from "Natural Mystic."

His second album, Rasta Mystic, was produced by Mad Professor, with rhythms provided by Mafia & Fluxy on drum and bass, Joe Ariwa on percussion, and Black Steel on guitar, released on Ariwa in 2000.

Banton has remained popular, and headlined the Aldajah Reggae Festival in Spain in 2005.

== Discography ==
=== Albums ===
- Powers Youth (1997) Fashion (Starkey Banton meets the Dub Organiser)
- Rasta Mystic (2000) Ariwa
- 'Joy Of The World (2005)Jet Star / Bantonic
