= Geoffrey Chung =

Geoffrey Aloysius Chung
- Born: 1950
- Origin: Kingston, Jamaica
- Died: 13 October 1995 (aged 44)
- Genres: Reggae, dub, ska, rocksteady
- Occupations: Musician, recording engineer, record producer
- Instrument: Keyboards
- Years active: Late 1960s–1995

Geoffrey Aloysius Chung (1950 – 13 October 1995) was a Jamaican musician, recording engineer, and record producer.

== Biography ==
Chung was born in 1950 in Kingston, Jamaica. Chung was Chinese Jamaican. He worked as a session keyboard player and guitarist in the 1960s, as a member of The Mighty Mystics and the Now Generation Band, both of which also included his brother, guitarist Mikey Chung, and Lee "Scratch" Perry's band The Upsetters, among others. He began working as a producer in the 1970s, initially with Sharon Forrester on her debut album, and set up his Edge productions company in 1974. His productions included work by The Abyssinians, The Heptones, and Marcia Griffiths. He also worked with Ras Michael's Sons of Negus band, on the 1975 album Rastafari Dub, playing synthesizer, organ and piano, and worked regularly with singer Pablo Moses, both as keyboard player and producer, including his first and best-known recording "I Man a Grasshopper". Chung also produced the recordings that would be released as the first two albums from Ijahman Levi. In the early 1980s, he became resident engineer at the Dynamic studios, where he mixed several albums by Peter Tosh, and he co-produced early recordings by Frankie Paul. In the late 1980s, he relocated to Miami, where he established his own recording studio. In 1991, he produced and engineered Maxi Priest's Best of Me album. Chung died in 1995 of liver failure. His work continued to be released since his death, such as the 2003 release of Everton Blender's King Man album, where he played clavinet and acted as engineer.
