= Close to You (Maxi Priest song) =

1990 song by Maxi Priest

Single by Maxi Priest

from the album Bonafide
- B-side: "I Know Love"; "Sure Fire Love"
- Released: 1990
- Genre: Pop; dance-pop; R&B; soul; reggae; new jack swing
- Length: 5:25 (album version); 3:59 (radio mix)
- Label: 10
- Songwriters: Maxi Priest; Gary Benson; Winston Sela
- Producers: Handel Tucker; Geoffrey Chung; Lowell "Sly" Dunbar

Maxi Priest singles chronology
"Goodbye to Love Again" (1988)	"Close to You" (1990)	"Peace Throughout the World" (1990)

Music video
- "Close to You" on YouTube

"Close to You" is a song by English reggae singer Maxi Priest, released in 1990 by 10 Records as the lead single from his fifth album, Bonafide (1990). It was written by Priest with Gary Benson and Winston Sela, and produced by Handel Tucker, Geoffrey Chung and Lowell "Sly" Dunbar. "Close to You" reached number one on the US Billboard Hot 100, number two on the Australian ARIA Singles Chart, and number seven on the UK Singles Chart. Its accompanying music video was directed by Geoffrey Barish.

== Critical reception ==
Ron Wynn from AllMusic said the song "is more pop/R&B with a reggae touch than it is real reggae." A reviewer from Music & Media commented, "After a tougher than normal start, this song quickly becomes another Maxi Priest single like all the others. Nice melody and well sung." David Giles from Music Week wrote, "A discernible step in the soul direction from the reggae maestro. Though the emphasis is still firmly on melody and honeyed vocals, the rhythm leans dancefloor-wards. Very commercial." Troy L. Smith of cleveland.com called it "the mellowest new jack swing song you'll ever hear", while Tom Breihan of Stereogum classified it as dance-pop.

== Music videos ==
The music video for "Close to You", directed by Geoffrey Barish, features Priest singing while the background features people in Egypt. There is also a second version, which takes place inside of a soundstage.

== Track listings ==
- 7-inch single and cassette single
1. "Close to You" (Radio Mix) – 3:59
2. "I Know Love" featuring Tiger – 4:07
- 12-inch maxi-single
1. "Close to You" (Phil Bodger Main Body Mix) – 5:28
2. "Close to You" (Leo Grant Bad-Ass Mix) – 6:00
3. "Close to You" (Leo Grant Acappella & Drum Mix) – 5:56
4. "Close to You" (Phil Bodger Radio Mix) – 3:59
5. "Close to You" (Phil Chill's Rap Sensation) – 6:08
6. "Close to You" (Bodger's bonus beats) – 4:03
7. "I Know Love" – 4:07
- CD maxi-single
1. "Close to You"
2. "Close to You" (Extended Version)
3. "I Know Love"
4. "Close to You" (Phil Chill's Rap Sensation Mix featuring Darren Deere)
- CD maxi-single – Remixes
1. "Close to You" (Phill Chill's Rap Sensation) – 6:08
2. "Close to You" (Bodger's Radio Edit) – 4:06
3. "I Know Love" (Steven Stanley Jamaican Mix) – 5:06
4. "Sure Fire Love" – 3:55
- 12-inch maxi-single – Remixes
1. "Close to You" (Phill Chill's Rap Sensation) – 6:08
2. "Close to You" (Bodger's Radio Edit) – 4:06
3. "I Know Love" (Steven Stanley Jamaican Mix) – 5:06
4. "Sure Fire Love" – 3:57

== Charts ==
=== Weekly charts ===
Chart (1990)	Peak position
Australia (ARIA)	2
Austria (Ö3 Austria Top 40)	8
Belgium (Ultratop 50 Flanders)	9
Canada Top Singles (RPM)	6
Canada Adult Contemporary (RPM)	11
Canada Dance/Urban (RPM)	1
Europe (Eurochart Hot 100)	18
France (SNEP)	49
Germany (GfK)	4
Greece (IFPI)	2
Ireland (IRMA)	26
Luxembourg (Radio Luxembourg)	3
Netherlands (Dutch Top 40)	4
Netherlands (Single Top 100)	5
New Zealand (Recorded Music NZ)	2
Sweden (Sverigetopplistan)	2
Switzerland (Schweizer Hitparade)	10
UK Singles (Official Charts)	7
US Billboard Hot 100	1
US 12-inch Singles Sales (Billboard)	9
US Adult Contemporary (Billboard)	15
US Dance Club Play (Billboard)	12
US Hot R&B Singles (Billboard)	2
US Cash Box Top 100	4

=== Year-end charts ===
Chart (1990)	Position
Australia (ARIA)	36
Belgium (Ultratop)	93
Canada Top Singles (RPM)	67
Canada Dance/Urban (RPM)	18
Europe (Eurochart Hot 100)	38
Germany (Media Control)	29
Netherlands (Dutch Top 40)	20
Netherlands (Single Top 100)	55
New Zealand (RIANZ)	7
Sweden (Topplistan)	21
US Billboard Hot 100	17
US Hot R&B Singles (Billboard)	30
US Cash Box Top 100	14

== Certifications ==
Region	Certification	Certified units/sales
Australia (ARIA)	Gold	35,000^{^}
New Zealand (RMNZ)	Gold	15,000^{‡}
Sweden (GLF)	Gold	25,000^{^}
United Kingdom (BPI)	Silver	200,000^{‡}
United States (RIAA)	Gold	500,000^{^}
^{^} Shipments figures based on certification alone.^{‡} Sales+streaming figures based on certification alone.

== Release history ==
Region	Date	Format(s)	Label(s)	Ref.
United Kingdom	1990	7-inch vinyl; 12-inch vinyl; CD	10	
Australia	11 June 1990	7-inch vinyl; 12-inch vinyl; cassette	10; Virgin	
Japan	21 July 1990	Mini-CD	10; Virgin	

== Cover versions ==
In 2003, trance act Origene covered the song. In 2004, American boy band B3 covered the song on their album Living for the Weekend, which also features Maxi Priest on backing vocals. In 2006, Puerto Rican reggaeton group Pachanga covered the song on their album Recontra locos latinos and released it as their second single. In the same year, Dutch singer Jay Delano of hip hop duo R'n'G fame covered the song and released it as his debut solo single of his debut solo album Close to You, released in 2007. In 2014, US group the Uptown Band released a contemporary jazz version of the song which appears on the group's full-length CD Heart, Soul, Body & Mind.
