= Boom Shack-A-Lak =

1993 single by Apache Indian

Single by Apache Indian

from the album Make Way for the Indian
- Released: 2 August 1993
- Genre: Pop; dancehall
- Length: 3:48
- Label: Island
- Songwriter: Steven Kapur
- Producer: Wooligan

Apache Indian singles chronology
"Chok There" (1993)	"Boom Shack-A-Lak" (1993)	"Movin' On" (1993)

Music video
- "Boom Shack-A-Lak" on YouTube

"Boom Shack-A-Lak" is a song by British singer, songwriter and reggae deejay Apache Indian, released in August 1993 by Island Records and also included on his extended play Nuff Vibes. The song was written by Steven Kapur (real name of Apache Indian) and gave him his biggest hit in the United Kingdom, reaching number five on the UK Singles Chart. The single and EP were also released worldwide, reaching the top 10 in both Ireland and the Netherlands while reaching the top 20 in Austria and New Zealand. It was nominated in the category for 12-Inch at the NAIRD 1994 and the music video won an award at the 1994 Black Music Awards.

== Critical reception ==
Larry Flick from Billboard magazine described the song as "a wacky blend of guttural toasting and retro-pop shuffle beats." He felt the hook "has the potential to take up permanent residence in your brain, while the fun array of sound effects are sure to get those shoulders shakin' out of control." He also encouraged, "Seek it out and give it a whirl." The Guardian called it a "cute" hit. Andy Beevers from Music Week named it Pick of the Week in the category of Dance, declaring it as "a bouncey Shaggy-style party track that is destined to get plenty of summertime radio play."

David Quantick from NME viewed it as "so jovial and bouncy". Tony Cross from Smash Hits gave it a full score of five out of five, naming it Best New Single. He wrote, "Trying not to wind your body down to this is like trying not to chew a Rowntree's fruit pastille. Apache's belly-wriggler is fabber than Shabba and shaggier than Shaggy, and his Brummy raggamuffin beat is a dance hall dream come true. Apache invites everybody to join him in one massive ragga party, putting his Bhangra roots on the back burner for the summer. A great record that will surely mean the big time at last for the Apache..."

== Music video ==
The accompanying music video for "Boom Shack-A-Lak" was directed by British film director, DJ and musician Don Letts and produced by Frank Hilton for Gravity. It was released on 9 August 1993 and includes footage of Apache's hectic Indian tour. The video won the Best Reggae Video award at the 1994 Black Music Awards in London.

== Track listings ==
- Nuff Vibes EP
1. "Boom Shack-A-Lak" (edit) – 3:48
2. "Caste System" (edit) – 3:40
3. "Warning" – 4:39
4. "Fun" – 4:05
- US, French, and Dutch single
1. "Boom Shack-A-Lak" (edit) – 3:48
2. "Boom Shack-A-Lak" (instrumental) – 3:48
3. "Boom Shack-A-Lak" – 4:31
4. "Warning" – 4:39

== Charts ==
=== Weekly charts ===
Chart (1993–1994)	Peak position
Australia (ARIA)	34
Austria (Ö3 Austria Top 40)	13
Belgium (Ultratop 50 Flanders)	24
Canada Dance/Urban (RPM)	7
Europe (Eurochart Hot 100)	24
Europe (European Dance Radio)	8
Europe (European Hit Radio)	32
Germany (GfK)	32
Iceland (Íslenski Listinn Topp 40)	19
Ireland (IRMA)	8
Netherlands (Dutch Top 40)	11
Netherlands (Single Top 100)	10
New Zealand (Recorded Music NZ)	19
UK Singles (Official Charts)	5
UK Airplay (Music Week)	10

=== Year-end charts ===
Chart (1993)	Position
Brazil (Crowley)	95
UK Singles (OCC)	54

== Certifications ==
Region	Certification	Certified units/sales
United Kingdom (BPI)	Silver	200,000^{^}
^{^} Shipments figures based on certification alone.

== Release history ==
Region	Date	Format(s)	Label(s)	Ref.
United Kingdom	2 August 1993	7-inch vinyl; 12-inch vinyl; CD; cassette	Island	
Australia	23 August 1993	CD; cassette	Island	
Japan	25 April 1994	CD	Island	

== In popular culture ==
"Boom Shack-A-Lak" was used in an Axe advertisement, starring Jennifer Aniston.
