= Trevor Wyatt =

Trevor Wyatt is a British record company manager and record producer.

Wyatt was Chris Blackwell's first employee at Island Records London. Trevor drove the Island cab, delivering records to the stores as well as taking the artists around when they came to town. As Island grew, Trevor became the studio manager, UK A&R manager, and house producer, first in Island's Basing Street Studios and then at Island's HQ at St Peter's Square in Hammersmith. As such, he became a source of knowledge on who had recorded what in the studio and where their sessions could be found. Many compilations on the Island label existed purely because Trevor found material in the archives and brought it to the appropriate label manager's attention. He was responsible for the Island Reggae Greats series of releases, and also found many alternate takes and demos for box sets by Nick Drake and Sandy Denny.

After the takeover by Universal Records, Wyatt followed Blackwell to Palm Pictures, where he worked for some years. He is now an independent artist manager.
