= Laurel & Hardy (reggae) =

Laurel & Hardy were a British reggae cockney deejay duo best known for their hit single "Clunk Click".

== History ==
Phaul (Paul) Dawkins (a.k.a. Laurel) (October 10th 1963- October 3rd 2022) and Anthony Robinson (a.k.a. Hardy) had originally worked together as a soul duo, but found more success after moving into reggae in 1978, initially performing under the name Reverend T and Pope Paul, along with a female singer known as the Virgin Mary. By the time of the release of their debut single ("You're Nicked") on Fashion Records in 1982, they were performing as Laurel & Hardy, adopting bowler hats, bow ties and suits in imitation of the comedy duo. They also made several television appearances which included The Tube and No. 73. "You're Nicked" was successful enough to get the duo signed by CBS Records, and they toured the UK supporting Pigbag, and then as headliners supported by Benjamin Zephaniah. They recorded a session for John Peel's BBC Radio 1 show in October 1982, for which they were backed by a band "The Lavender Hill Mob" including guitarist John Kpiaye and Aswad's Angus Gaye. They recorded another session for David Jensen's show in March 1983.

Their most successful release was "Clunk Click", the title a reference to a campaign to get people to wear car seatbelts. It reached number 65 in the UK Singles Chart in 1983 and they appeared several times on national television to promote it. They released a further single for CBS but were then dropped, returning to smaller labels for later releases. They released one album while together, What a Bargain (1983). They also appeared in the Channel 4 comedy No Problems (1984 ) as Bim & Bam..

Laurel (Paul Dawkins) died in October 2022.

== Discography ==
=== Albums ===
- What a Bargain (1983), EMI/Upright

=== Singles ===
- "You're Nicked"c/w "Tell Her Seh Mi Sorry" (1982), Fashion
- "Clunk Click"c/w "You're Nicked" [Remix] (1983), CBS - UK no. 65
- "Lots of Loving (and She's Gone)"c/w "Wan Fe Rave" (1983), CBS
- "Dangerous Shoes"c/w "Write Me A Letter" (1983), EMI/Upright
- "Johnny's Won The Lottery" (1997), Studio Fun
- "Vegetarian Cheese" (1997), Studio Fun
- "It's Not On" (1997, (1997) Studio Fun

=== Compilation appearances ===
- The Beerdrop Explodes (1982), Abstract Sounds: "You're Nicked"
- Great British M.C.'s (1984), Fashion: "You're Nicked"
