= Promis (musician) =

José Promis
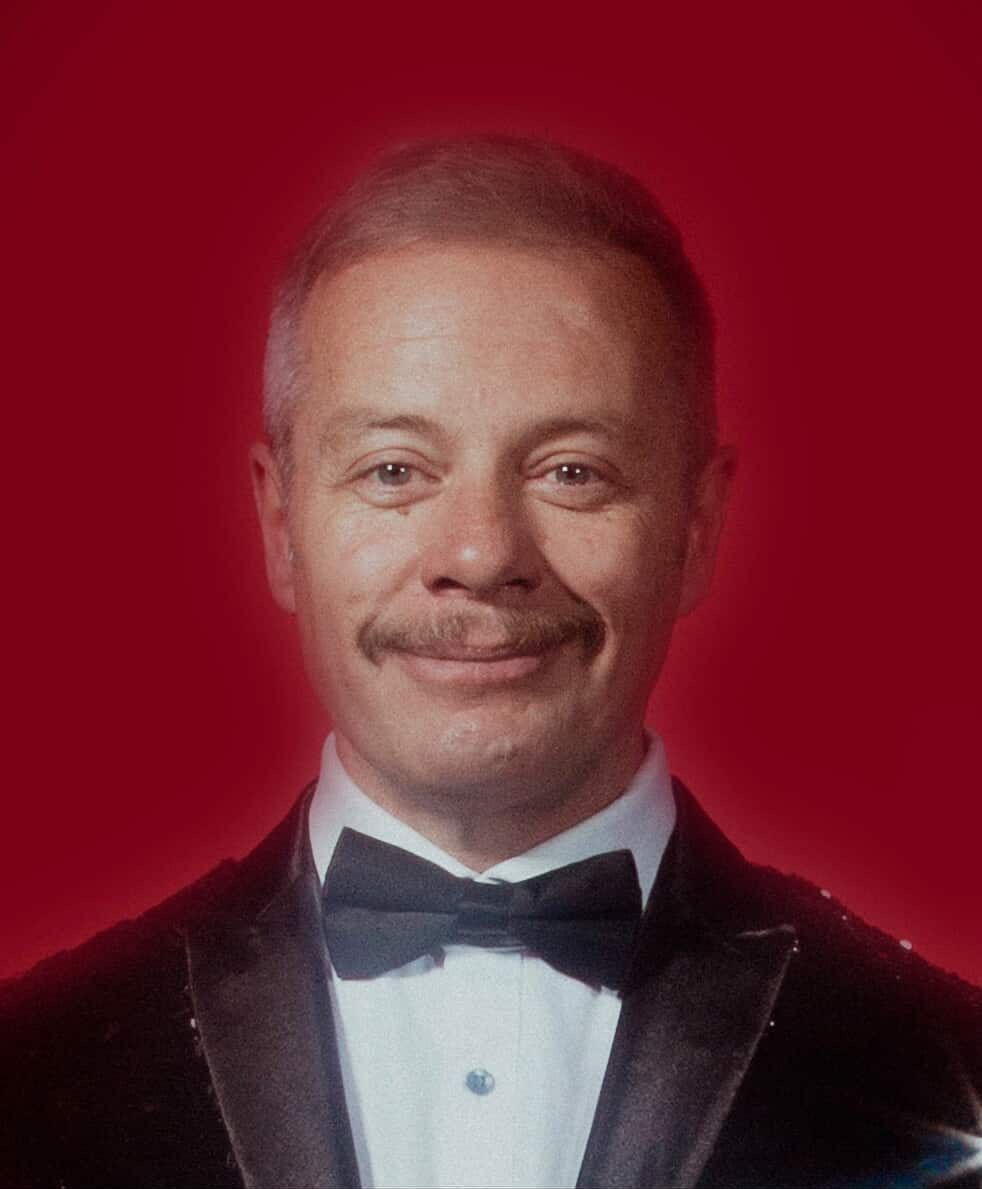
- José Promis in 2025
- Born: José Francisco Promis Hoyuelos; January 28, 1973 (age 53); Viña del Mar, Chile
- Musical career
- Genres: Nouvelle chanson, pop, indie pop, electronic music
- Instruments: Vocals; Keyboards; Piano
- Years active: 2005–present
- Labels: JFP Music, darumeshi records, Young Pals Music, Plaza Mayor Ltd., Mapa Records
- Website: www.promis-music.com

José Francisco Promis Hoyuelos or Jose F. Promis (born January 28, 1973, in Viña del Mar, Chile) is a Chilean-American singer-songwriter and composer, and son of the Chilean literature professor José Promis.

== Personal life ==
As a four-year-old he and his parents emigrated from Chile to Tucson, AZ, as his father fled from the Chilean regime under dictator Augusto Pinochet. Promis graduated from the University of Arizona in Media Arts & Journalism and in 1997 he moved to Los Angeles. Once Promis was settled, he began a career in music journalism that would see his reviews, retrospectives and the like feature at outlets such as All Music Guide and Billboard. During this period, Promis also began to learn how to write and compose songs via the piano which later led to him becoming a full-time musician in 2008.

== Music career ==
Promis' music combination is a style of music which he calls "electric cabaret," songs that can either be played on a solo piano or arranged with electronics and real musicians.

=== Promis, Promis 2, Promis III (2005–2008) ===
His eponymous debut album was released in 2005 and revealed that Promis was already influenced by the French chanson method and adult pop music structure, but there was a decidedly lo-fi element to the long player. The second album Promis issued, Promis 2 (2007), uncovered further sonic touchstones which included classical, Gothic, Mediterranean, and Balkan music. In a review of Promis 2, reviewer Leonard Lair remarked of the album, "Promis 2 is too long an album to take in one sitting, but overall it's the slower, subtler songs that should ensure Promis has a future beyond the reputation of a showman."

From 2008 Promis teamed up with British producer Ian Matthews in Los Angeles, who produced the third album Promis III. Matthews would become a musical partner throughout his career. The basic idea for this album was to combine Promis chansons with electronic production, putting Promis' songs to darker synthesizer sound.

=== Life Is Grand! and Love Stories (2009–2011) ===
In 2009 Promis wanted a turn back to Mediterranean music and recorded Life Is Grand!, which was produced and co-written by New York-based Turkish music producer Ayhan Sahin. The album was released on Sahin's label "Young Pals Music" and featured a full pop sound where he partnered with several other singers like Karine Hannah on the song "Lovesick". Promis turned back on his original sound in 2011. He teamed up once again with Ian Matthews for his fifth album Love Stories (2011). This project was recorded as his mother was dying of terminal cancer, this is reflected in some of the album's darker material. But Love Stories also features lighter moments and selections inspired by Balkan sounds.

=== Vertigo Heights, Indiscretions, Sunset Blvd. (2012–2015) ===
In 2012, Promis and his producer Matthews began work on Vertigo Heights, one of two albums to emerge from the pair in a four year span that combined cabaret and Balkan to electronic to straightforward pop/rock; Sunset Blvd. followed in 2015. Sunset Blvd. was inspired by the classic 1950 Billy Wilder film of the same name and included among its impressive song roster an electro-pop oriented cover of Amanda Lear's "The Sphinx." In a write-up on Sunset Blvd. from The Rainbow Hub, the reviewer stated, "Sunset Blvd." is a worthy listen that brings you intimately into a world that many of us dream of but few of us ever get a chance to see.

Regarding his solo output which Promis continued to do in between his team-up projects with Matthews; his sixth studio album Indiscretions was issued in 2014. Reviewer Leicester Bangs commented, "All in all it's the sort of record that the dedicated listener can really get their teeth into and I'm happy to recommend it – unreservedly." Having sharpened his handsome brand of quirky, erudite pop, Promis encountered a series of personal and professional changes in his life which helped to shape the next chapter of his artistic evolution.

=== Electric Cabaret, Lust and Found (2016–2021) ===
Promis signed to German-English label darumeshi records and produced "Electric Cabaret" (2017). It was his ninth effort and debut release with new compositions; it went on to produce the singles "Dragons", "We're Grown Up People", and "Can I Just See What it Feels Like to Kiss You“ with several remixes. Due to the dissolution of darumeshi records in 2019, all rights to the releases reverted to Promis, and he produced the experimental album Lust & Found (2020) with producer Mike Closer in Berlin, his tenth LP. The record features melodic, narrative-driven songs that mix quirky, introspective lyrics with vintage-toned pop arrangements.

=== Promises, Canciones del Mercado Negro, Draconian Rules & Dirty Old Man (2022-2026) ===
Promises is José Promis eleventh installation and was released digitally on March 5, 2022. The album was recorded in Berlin, Nice, and Los Angeles, and was produced by Promis together with Ian Matthews, with mastering by David Pascucci. Lyrically, Promises addresses themes of personal relationships, emotional reflection, and everyday experiences. During the writing process, Promis began composing songs in his native tongue Spanish, which marked a significant development in his songwriting. The album also led to his collaboration with the music publishing company and label Plaza Mayor. It has been described as an international, cross-cultural pop project bridging European and American influences.

With his twelfth album "Canciones del Mercado Negro" Promis completely turned to writing songs in his native Spanish. It was also issued through the Chilean music publishing company and label Plaza Mayor Company Ltd. The album also represents a return to Promis’s cultural background after several years of working primarily in Europe. Musically, Canciones del Mercado Negro blends elements of Latin and Chilean folk traditions with influences from cabaret, chanson, and 1970s pop. The project was conceived as a cross-cultural work combining memories of Promis’s upbringing in Chile with stylistic impressions from Berlin and other European cities.

Promis started to work with Ian Matthews already in 2018 on another Promis & Matthews album named later "Draconian Rules“. The album was almost seven years in the making and released digitally in March 2025. It was also made available through Bandcamp and major streaming platforms. Draconian Rules continues the long-standing collaboration between Promis and Matthews, following earlier joint releases such as Vertigo Heights (2012) and Sunset Blvd (2015). The album "Draconian Rules“ presents a melodramatic, theatrical pop style with elements of cabaret and soundtrack-influenced songwriting. According to official descriptions, the album explores themes including social behavior, desire, restraint, and paranoia, while avoiding a direct classification as a lockdown-era project.

In 2026 Promis releases his fourteenth album, "Dirty Old Man“.

=== Re-Issues ===
As the first ten albums were released as "Promis“ only, and José Promis decided to release albums under his real name "José Promis“, it was necessary to re-issue his first albums digitally. Between 2021 and 2025 he thus released re-issues of almost all of his albums:In 2021 he released Electric Cabaret as an "Expanded Version" featuring bonus tracks and rare remixes [17]. In 2023 his first three albums were reissued with the label Mapa Records from Chile. They were also renamed as ‚"The First Album“ (Promis I) [18], "The Second Album“ (Promis II) and "The Third Album“ (Promis III). Also the albums "Love Songs“, "Indescretions“ and "Disco Cabaret“ were re-issued.

=== Musical and film ===
In the beginning of 2016 his original songs comprised most of the musical A Night at the Black Cat Theatre at the Edgemar Center for the Arts in Santa Monica. Together with Juwelia St. St. he wrote the musical "Hungry Roses" which contains original songs by both with weird lyrics in English and German. Also, Promis plays the show "Black Market" with Parisian actress Anne Wagret performing songs by Kurt Weill, Friedrich Hollaender, Promis himself, and other artists

Promis and Juwelia St. St. will also appear in the movie "Überleben in Neukölln" (English: "Survival in Berlin-Neukölln") by German filmmaker Rosa von Praunheim, which premiered at the Filmfest München. Promis recounted his experience in Berlin which led him to work with Juwelia St. St., "The story is that in my early Berlin trips, musician friends of mine introduced me to underground drag legend Juwelia, and I became her composer, performing regularly at her salon Galerie Studio St. St. and that is what gave me my Berlin "fame" so to speak. The songs we wrote together, which are trashy Berlin cabaret songs, became the soundtrack to that film and were released as an album."

== Discography ==
=== Albums ===
- Promis (2005)
- Promis 2 (2007)
- Promis III (2008)
- Life Is Grand! (2009)
- Love Stories (2011)
- Vertigo Heights (as Promis & Matthews) (2012)
- Indiscretions (2014)
- Sunset Blvd. (as Promis & Matthews) (2015)
- Electric Cabaret (2017)
- Lust & Found (2020)
- Promises (2022)
- Canciones del Mercado Negro (2023)
- Draconian Rules (as Promis & Matthews) (2025)
- Dirty Old Man (2026)

=== Compilations ===
- 2016 As Promised – The Best of Promis, Vol. 1
- 2018 Disco Cabaret (Remix Album)

=== Singles and EPs ===
- 2010 Say Good-Bye To Summer
- 2014 Christmas With Our Friends
- 2016 Martinis at Noon EP
- 2016 The Sphinx (as Promis & Matthews)
- 2016 50 Bucks From Me EP
- 2016 Dragons EP
- 2017 We're Grown Up People
- 2017 Can I Just See What It Feels Like to Kiss You
- 2017 Flash and a Flame (feat. Juval Porat)
- 2020 Quarantine (feat. Juval Porat)

=== Musicals and shows ===
- "A Night at Black Cat Cabaret" Edgemar Center for the Arts, Santa Monica, CA (2008, 2016)
- "Hungry Roses" with Juwelia St. St. (2016)
- "Black Market" (songs by Kurt Weill, Marlene Dietrich a.o.) with Anne Wagret (2017)

=== Side projects ===
- 2014 Fashion Invasion feat. Promis – Feeling Free (single/collaboration)
- 2017 Promis x Flixxcore – 50 Bucks from Me 2K17 (single/collaboration)
- 2017 Marq Aurel & Rayman Rave feat. Promis – In Time (single/collaboration)
- 2017 "Hungry Roses" – An Evening With José Promis & Juwelia (soundtrack for the film "Überleben in Neukölln")
