= Mikey Bennett =

Jamaican music producer

Mikey Bennett is a Jamaican music producer, composer, musician and singer.

== Early life and influences ==
Mikey Bennett was born into a Christian family in Jamaica. Church is where Bennett realised he had musical talent. At the age of 12, Bennett was influenced greatly by guitarist Mikey Chung. He would write his lyrics and Chung would help Bennett put them to music. He attended what is now the Northern Caribbean University based in Mandeville, Jamaica.

== Career ==
Bennett has been on the music scene since the 1980s. He has composed and produced music for international artists including Ziggy Marley, Maxi Priest, Dennis Brown, and UB40, Shabba Ranks, J.C. Lodge, Cocoa Tea, Home T Four, Admiral Bailey, and Johnny Osbourne. He recently directed and produced a reggae album titled The Heart of Jamaica for the longtime rum producer Appleton Estate.

Bennett is the CEO of Grafton Studios in Vineyard Town, St. Andrew, Jamaica. He has also taught song writing at the University of Technology (Utech), Kingston, Jamaica. He has received many honours, among them the Jamaica Reggae Industry Association (JaRIA) award in 2017 for mentorship.

== Social responsibility ==
Bennett is involved in the Tower Street Correctional Facility music programme in Kingston, Jamaica and the St Catherine Adult Correctional Centre. Bennett also judges competitions for spotting local musical talents.

== Discography ==
Year	Album	Artist	Mikey Bennett
2018	A Real Labour of Love	UB40	Composer
2014	More Jammy$ from the Roots	King Jammy	Musician
2014	Evolution of Dub, Vol. 8: The Search for New Life	Alborosie / Shane Brown / Prince Jammy / Two Friends Crew	Producer
2013	Total Reggae: Chart Hits Reggae Style		Producer
2012	Playlist: King of Kings-Reggae Hits		Producer
2011	100% Tubes de L'Eté 2011		Composer
2008	The Best of Maxi Priest	Maxi Priest	Producer
2007	The Most High	Daddy Rings	Producer, Audio Production, Main Personnel, Various Instruments, Instrumentation
2007	Joe Gibbs Reggae Christmas	Joe Gibbs	Composer
2007	From Dubplate to Download: The Best of Greensleeves		Producer
2007	12" Rulers: Gussie Clarke		Vocals (Background)
2006	What a World	Bunny Rugs	Producer
2005	Hail the King	Fantan Mojah	Arranger
2005	Black, Gold, Green	Third World	Engineer
2003	Ultimate Reggae		Producer, Composer
2003	The Rhythm King	King Jammy	Musician
2003	Sing Our Own Song	Judy Mowatt	Producer
2003	Monday Morning Blues: The Best of Mikey 'Bumper' Melody	Mikey Melody	Producer, Musician
2003	Dragonfly	Ziggy Marley	Vocal Arrangement
2003	Can't Stop a Man: The Ultimate Collection	Beres Hammond	Producer, Composer
2003	Abijah	Ras Abijah	Producer, Composer
2002	Under the Moonlight	Ghost	Producer, Keyboards, Vocal Arrangement
2002	The Dot.com Rhythm		Engineer
2002	Reggae Xplosion 2002		Composer
2001	The Reggae Box		Producer
2001	Reggae for Jesus		Producer, Arranger
2001	Modern Roots	David Kirton	Producer, Keyboards, Bass, Composer
2001	Coming at You	Stevie Face	Musician
2001	Adrenalin	Don Yute	Producer
2001	Absolutely the Best: 1957-1999	Dennis Brown	Producer
2000	Spirit of a Woman	Marijah	Composer
2000	Doin' Fine	Word!	Producer, Executive Producer
2000	Babymother		Composer
1999	Stranger	David Kirton	Producer, Vocal Arrangement, Percussion Arrangement, Drum Arrangements, Harmonic Arrangement
1999	Shabba Ranks and Friends	Shabba Ranks	Producer, Arranger
1998	Tuff Tracks: Tuff Gong Compilation	Marley Girls	Producer
1998	My Son the Fanatic	My Son the Fanatic	Composer
1998	Music of the World Cup		Producer
1998	Living Dangerously	Barrington Levy	Composer
1998	Hardcore Ragga: The Music Works Dancehall Hits		Vocals (Background), Vocal Arrangement, Composer, Lyricist
1998	Earth, Vol. 3	LTJ Bukem	Percussion
1997	Ragga Beat: Slammin' on a Ragga Tip!	The Eurobeats	Composer
1997	Natty Queen Divas		Producer, Musician
1997	Little Sound Boy	Little Sound Boy	Composer, Lyricist
1997	Klash: Kaught Up in Da Mix		Composer
1997	Fallen Is Babylon	Ziggy Marley / Ziggy Marley & the Melody Makers	Harmonic Arrangement
1997	Dub Wicked	Michael Rose	Engineer
1996	Yard Style	Johnny King	Keyboards, Bass, Vocal Arrangement
1996	Serious Girl	Chevelle Franklin	Producer
1996	Nuh Carbon	Mykal Rose	Bass
1996	Love From a Distance	Beres Hammond	Producer, Composer
1996	Greensleeves Sampler 13		Composer
1996	Dancehall Queens: What a Bam Bam		Producer
1995	Welcome to Jamerica	Ipso Facto	Producer
1995	Set Me Free	Gregory Isaacs	Vocals (Background)
1994	Worl-A-Girl	Worl-A-Girl	Producer
1994	Hey Now (Girls Just Want to Have Fun)	Cyndi Lauper	Producer
1994	Greatest Hits	Shabba Ranks	Producer, Arranger
1994	DJ Red Alert's Propmaster Dancehall Show		Producer
1993	Vibes of the Time	Tony Rebel	Producer
1993	Reggae Ambassadors: 20th Anniversary Collection	Third World	Producer, Synthesizer
1993	MTV Party to Go, Vol. 3		Producer
1993	Call Me Mr. Easy	Ian Dyer	Producer
1993	Beach of the War Goddess	Caron Wheeler	Composer
1993	As a Matter of Fox	Red Fox	Producer, Composer
1992	The Word	Hopeton Lindo	Producer, Keyboards, Bass, Executive Producer
1992	Rough & Ready, Vol. 1	Shabba Ranks	Producer, Arranger
1992	Mr. Maximum	Shabba Ranks	Producer, Mixing, Vocals (Background), Vocal Arrangement
1992	House Call [CD EP]	Shabba Ranks	Producer, Composer
1992	Groovin' in the Midnight [CD]	Maxi Priest	Producer
1992	Fe Real	Maxi Priest	Producer
1992	Deep Cover		Producer
1992	Committed	Third World	Producer, Synthesizer, Vocals (Background), Composer
1992	Carlene Davis	Carlene Davis	Producer, Keyboards
1992	Authorized	Cocoa Tea	Vocals (Background), Vocal Supervision
1992	Another One for the Road	Home T	Producer
1991	Two Friends: Twin City Spin 2		Producer
1991	Two Friends: Ting and Ting		Producer, Composer
1991	The Best of Me	Maxi Priest	Producer
1991	Over Proof	Dennis Brown	Producer, Keyboards, Executive Producer, Vocal Arrangement, Composer
1991	Moonlight	Dean Fraser	Producer
1991	Me Gone Buck Wild: Reggae Dance Hall Killers		Producer
1991	As Raw as Ever	Shabba Ranks	Producer, Arranger, Keyboards
1991	After Hours [VP]		Producer, Vocal Arrangement
1989	Greensleeves Sampler 4		Composer
1988	Rappin with the Ladies	Shabba Ranks	Vocals (Background), Vocal Arrangement
1980	Three Sides to My Story	Culture	Vocal Supervision
	Total Reggae: Summer Vibes		Composer
	Total Reggae: Greensleeves 40th, 1977-2017		Composer, Producer
	The Classic 90s Collection [Sony Music]		Producer
	Songs for Reggae Lovers, Vol. 3		Producer
	Reggae Mandela		Producer
	Party on: The Only Party Album You'll Ever Need		Producer
	Massive Hits: Reggae And Ska		Composer, Lyricist
	Down in Jamaica: 40 Years of VP Records		Composer
