= Gary Benson (musician) =

English singer and songwriter

Gary Benson (born Harry Hyams) is an English singer and songwriter.

== Career ==
Benson spent eight weeks on the UK Singles Chart in 1975 with his own composition, "Don't Throw It All Away". The single, released on the State Records label (State Records STAT10), reached No. 20 on the chart, leading to an appearance on BBC Television's Top of the Pops. The song had originally been recorded by the Shadows, and they had performed it in the 1975 A Song for Europe contest, where it finished fourth of six entries. The song was covered in the United States by the Delfonics in 1978. There are also a number of reggae versions that include a dancehall style cut by Barrington Levy. Olivia Newton-John recorded a version of the track, including it on her 1976 album Come On Over.

Benson had previously written a finalist for the 1974 UK competition, finishing last with the song "Someday", one of the six shortlisted entries performed by Olivia Newton-John. Benson had further attempts at winning the UK ticket to the Eurovision Song Contest, reaching the UK finals in 1977 with "After All This Time", performed by Wesley, Park and Smith, finishing fifth of 12; in 1981 with "All Cried Out", which he performed himself to place fourth of 8, and was later released on the WEA label; and in 1993 with "It's Just a Matter of Time" performed by Sonia, finishing last of eight entries. Benson tried again in 1998 with Alan Glass on the song "Give It Up" performed by Lisa Millet which finished eighth of the eight songs in the preliminary radio heat.

In 1970, Benson's composition "Can't Afford to Lose", recorded by Jon Lukas, made it to the top 40 charts in the UK and some other European territories. It also occupied the top place in the pop charts in Lebanon for a full month, holding back the Beatles' "The Long and Winding Road" from reaching the No. 1 spot. Benson's song "Let Her In" was recorded by John Travolta which became a hit in 1976. Several other songs originally written and recorded by Benson were also recorded by Travolta, such as "Can't Let You Go" and "Whenever I'm Away from You", as well as by his brother, Joey Travolta ("Something's Up (Love Me Like the First Time)"). Another of Benson's compositions, "Close to You", was recorded by Maxi Priest. In 1976, he composed and sang "You", but it did not reach the UK charts.

== Discography ==
=== Albums ===
- Reunion (1970), Penny Farthing PELS506
- The Concert (1973), Birth Records RAB 5, re-released in 2006 in Japan on CD AIRAC-1239
- Don't Throw It All Away (1975), State ETAT3
- Gary Benson (1975), Penny Farthing PELS548
- New World (1976), State ETAT10
- The Gary Benson Story (1977), State
- Moonlight Walking (1980), Aura Records AUL172
- Rushing in to Love (1983), Kenwood Records AW-25038 (Japanese release)

=== Singles ===
- "Unpredictable Journey" / "His Home Coming" (1966), Astor
- "This Man's Got No Luck" (1966), Pye
- "Kentucky" (1968), Columbia
- "When the Clock Strikes Twelve" (1969), Bell
- "Holly" (1970), Penny Farthing
- "The Reunion" (1970 / 1975), Penny Farthing
- "The Concert" (1973), Birth
- "Sausalito" / "Let Her In" (1973), Young Blood
- "Don't Throw It All Away" (1975), State Records - UK #20
- "Tiffany" (1976), State Records
- "You" (1976), State Records
- "Let Her In" (1976), State Records
- "Sharing You" (1976), State Records
- "Can't Let You Go" (1977), State Records
- "Loving You Was Easy" (1978), Arista
- "Moonlight Walking" (1980), Trio Records
- "Dying to Live with You" (1980), Aura
- "All Cried Out" (1981), Warner Bros.
- "Video Games" (1983), Trio Records

== See also ==
- List of performances on Top of the Pops
