= Barry Boom =

- Born: Paul Robinson
- Genres: Reggae, lovers rock
- Occupations: Singer, songwriter, record producer
- Instrument: Vocals
- Years active: Early 1980s–present
- Labels: Fashion; Merger; MCA

Barry Boom (born Paul Robinson) is a reggae singer and record producer from London.

Paul Robinson was a member of the reggae group One Blood in the 1980s along with his brothers Errol, Jerry, Ewan & Trevor until the group broke up after Errol's death. One Blood released two albums in 1982 - In Love and Super Showcase. He also worked as a producer and songwriter for other artists, including the debut album by Maxi Priest and Philip Papa Levi's stylistically groundbreaking discomix, "Mi God Mi King", (the first single by a UK-born artist to reach number one in Jamaica) backed by Caution and released on the Level Vibes record label in a vocal and dub style.

Barry Boom was the producer of Maxi Priest's first album You're Safe released in 1985 . The album features a number of covers, amongst them versions of Delroy Wilson's "Dancin' Mood" and a Larry Marshall (singer) tune, "Throw me Corn", both of which were well received hits when first released in Jamaica. The album also features an updated UK roots version of Yabby You's "Stand Up And Fight."

In 1986, Maxi Priest once more got together with Barry Boom, Drummie Zeb, Brinsley Forde and Tony Gad of Aswad, chanteuse Carroll Thompson, (aka "Queen of Lovers Rock" ), Mafia & Fluxy and Trevor Hartley of Burning Rockers, with Godwin Logie on the mixing desk to create their own version of Van Morrison’s track "Crazy Love", which was released as a single, and also featured on Priest's second album, Intentions.

Boom's conscious Roots and Culture dubplate, "Wicked Shall Fall" aka "Crack of the Whip," proved much in demand on the Jah Shaka sound system in UK in the mid 1980s. After One Blood, he worked with Sly & Robbie before pursuing a solo career under the name Barry Boom, which he had previously used as a pseudonym for his production work. He signed to Fashion Records, one of the more successful UK-based reggae labels, and his first solo releases in 1989 included reggae number ones with "Making Love" and "Number One Girl", and "Hurry Over". His debut solo album, The Living Boom followed in 1990, featuring his three big hits from the previous year. He followed this with Trust Me in 1993, and signed to MCA Records for Taste of Things to Come in 1997.

In 1997 as jungle was in the ascendancy, drum and bass DJ/producer Aphrodite (musician) teamed up with Barry Boom to cut the “Stand and Deliver” Dubplate, built on a rhythm track based on Aaron Neville’s rare groove classic, “Hercules.”

Barry Boom later moved into gospel reggae, releasing His Love in 2018, a devotional album of mostly original arrangements, fused with his reworking of classic melodies from Eric Donaldson, Barbara Lynn,Delroy Wilson, John Holt and Errol Dunkley, commenting that “(w)ith my albums I have always done...songs giving thanks and praises to God". Speaking of the decision to release his own sound system dubplates as an official album, Barry Boom says, “(reaction to the dub plates) came out really well and when they played it in the dance, it tore down the place. By the time we got to the third song we figured this was too good to be just dub plates; we should continue and make an album…”

== Discography ==
- The Living Boom (1990), Fine Style/Fashion
- Trust Me (1993), Merger
- Taste of Things to Come (1997), Victor/MCA
- Everyday Life (2012)
- His Love (2018)

Compilations

- The Best of Barry Boom (1996), Sony
