= Frankie Paul =

Jamaican dancehall reggae artist (1965–2017)

- Born: Paul Blake; 19 October 1965; Kingston, Jamaica
- Died: 18 May 2017 (aged 51) Kingston, Jamaica
- Genres: Reggae, dancehall, lovers rock
- Instruments: Vocals, piano, drums
- Years active: 1980–2017
- Labels: VP, Jammy's, RAS

Paul Blake (19 October 1965 – 18 May 2017), better known as Frankie Paul, was a Jamaican dancehall reggae artist. Born blind, he was dubbed by some as the Jamaican Stevie Wonder.

== Biography ==
Born in Jamaica in 1965, Blake was born blind but as a child had his sight partially restored by an operation on a hospital ship. He sang for, and impressed Stevie Wonder when Wonder visited the school that Blake attended, prompting him to pursue a singing career.

Adopting the stage name Frankie Paul, he first found fame in the early 1980s, and he recorded prolifically throughout the decade. He recorded for virtually every producer/studio in Jamaica at some time, and was known to release several albums a year.

NME magazine entry on Frankie Paul
"Frankie Paul has a voice that improves with each release and, although initially compared with Dennis Brown, he has evolved a strange nasal, throaty style that makes him sound much older. It's the sheer exuberance of his best performances that give away his youthfulness, and his two London appearances have been joyous occasions."

Notable works of Frankie Paul include the popular "Sara" and "War is in the Dance".

Paul resided in The Gambia from 1994. In January 2016, he underwent surgery to amputate a foot and part of his leg.

Frankie Paul died on 18 May 2017 from complications with his liver at the University Hospital of the West Indies in Kingston, Jamaica.

== Discography ==
=== Albums ===
- Give the Youth a Chance (1982), Freedom Sounds – also released as Rich & Poor
- Pass the Tu-Sheng-Peng (1985), Nyam Up
- Tidal Wave (1985), Greensleeves
- Over the Wall (1985), Crystal
- Still Alive (1985), King Jammy's
- Shut Up Bway (1986), Ujama
- Sara (1987), Jammy's (JA) / Live & Love (UK/US)
- Warning (1987), RAS
- Alesha (1987)
- Fire Deh a Mus Tail (1988), Blacka Dread
- Dance Hall Duo (1988), RAS
- Slow Down (1988), VP
- Frankie Paul at Studio One (1988), Studio One
- Veteran (1989), VP
- Reaching Out (1989), Blue Mountain
- Can't Get You Out of My Mind (1990), Rohit
- Detrimental (1990), Rohit
- Get Closer (1990), Profile
- Start of Romance (1991), Sonic Sounds
- Best in Me (1991), VP
- Let's Chill (1991), VP
- Jamming (1991), VP
- Should I (1991), Heartbeat
- Money Talk (1991), Jammy's
- Sleepless Night (1992), Sonic Sounds
- Hot Number (1992), VP
- Tomorrow (1992), Sonic Sounds
- Cassanova (1992), Dynamic Sounds
- Live & Love (1992), VP
- Sizzling (1992), VP
- Don Man (1993), Philo
- Talk All You Want (1994), VP
- Hard Work (1994), RAS
- Time Less (1995), Tan-yah
- If You Want Me Girl (1995), Trojan
- Come Back Again (1996), VP
- Freedom (1996), RAS
- A We Rule (1997), RAS
- Live at Maritime Hall (1999), Artists Only
- Give Me That Feeling Freedom Blues (1999), Foxtail
- Forever (1999), World
- Rock On (1999), Charm
- Every Nigger Is a Star! (2000), Greensleeves
- Remember the Time (2001), Artists Only
- I Be Hold (2001), T.P.
- Don't Wanna Get Funky (2001), Prestige Elite
- Sara (2002), Fatman
- Blessed Me (2002), Scorpio
- Hardcore Loving (2003), Charm
- Asking for Love (2004), Jet Star (record distribution company)
- Who Issued the Guns (2006), Music Avenue
- Are You Ready (2007), Cousins
- Best of Friends (2007), Charm
- Tink Say Dem Know Me (2008), Jet Star
- Most Wanted (2011), Greensleeves
