= Maxi Priest =

British reggae singer (born 1961)

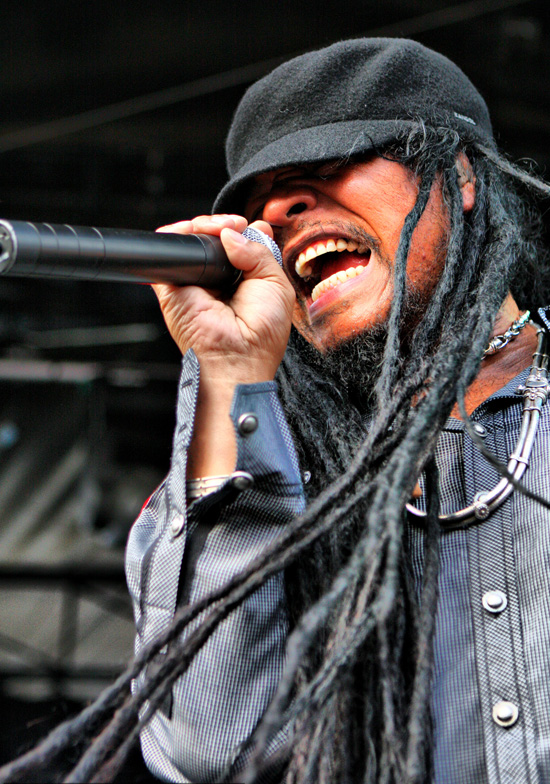
- Priest in 2011

Background information
- Born: Max Alfred Elliott; 10 June 1961 (age 65); Lewisham, London, England
- Genres: Reggae, Roots reggae, Dancehall, Rhythm and blues, Reggae fusion, Soul, Lovers rock, Dub, Sound System
- Occupations: Singer, songwriter
- Instrument: Vocals
- Years active: 1984–present
- Labels: Level Vibes; Charisma; Atlantic; Virgin; VP
- Website: maxipriest.com

Max Alfred Elliott (born 10 June 1961), known by his stage name Maxi Priest, is a British reggae vocalist of Jamaican descent. He is best known for singing reggae music with an R&B influence, otherwise known as reggae fusion. He was one of the first international artists to have success in this genre, and one of the most successful reggae fusion acts of all time.

== Early life ==
Maxi Priest was born in Lewisham, London, the second youngest of nine siblings. His parents had moved to England from Jamaica to provide more opportunity for their family and he grew up listening to gospel, reggae, R&B, funk and soul music. He first learned to sing in church, encouraged by his mother, who was a Pentecostal missionary.

Priest grew up listening to Jamaican artists such as Dennis Brown, Burning Spear, Coxsone Dodd's Studio One, John Holt, Ken Boothe, Beres Hammond and Gregory Isaacs as well as singers like Marvin Gaye, Al Green, Cat Stevens, Steve Winwood, the Beatles, Phil Collins and Frank Sinatra.

As a teenager, he lifted speaker boxes for the Jah Shaka and Negus Negast sound-systems. He was a founder member of Saxon Studio International, and it was with Saxon that Maxi began performing at neighbourhood youth clubs and house parties.

His music is sometimes influenced by R&B, which he blends with reggae. Priest lost his cousin Jacob Miller in a car crash on 23 March 1980. Miller was the frontman in the popular reggae group Inner Circle, as well as a reggae icon who had worked with King Tubby and Augustus Pablo.

Two of Priest's sons are also singers; Marvin Priest (born Marvin Cornell Elliott) and Ryan Elliott, who was in the 1990s boy band, Ultimate Kaos.

== Career ==
Priest's musical career began with him singing on the South London reggae soundsystem Saxon Studio International, after which some independent single releases followed, such as his recording entitled "Sensi", on a release with conscious dancehall toaster Papa Levi's breakthrough track, "Mi God Mi King" , backed by Paul Barry Boom's CAUTION, and released on the Level Vibes record label in a discomix vocal and dub style. Maxi Priest's early discomix releases secured his reputation with both the dancehall and the conscious roots reggae Lloyd Coxsone and Jah Shaka sound system audiences.

Maxi Priest's first album You're Safe released in 1985 features a number of covers, amongst them versions of Delroy Wilson's "Dancin' Mood" and a Larry Marshall (singer) tune, "Throw me Corn", both of which were well received hits when first released in Jamaica. The album also features an updated UK roots version of Yabby You's "Stand Up And Fight."

In 1986, Maxi Priest got together with Drummie Zeb, Brinsley Forde and Tony Gad of Aswad, chanteuse Carroll Thompson, (aka "Queen of Lovers Rock" ), Barry Boom, Mafia & Fluxy and Trevor Hartley of Burning Rockers with Godwin Logie on the mixing desk to create their own version of Van Morrison’s track "Crazy Love", which was released as a single, and also featured on Priest’s second album, Intentions, also released in 1986.

His breakthrough album though, was Maxi (titled Maxi Priest in the US and Canada), released in 1987, and, along with his cover of Cat Stevens' "Wild World" (which he recorded with Sly Dunbar and Robbie Shakespeare) established him as one of the top British reggae singers, with Spin observing that "Maxi…captures love's joys just as convincingly. Maxi is the sweet fruit from a branch of reggae…"

He is one of only two British reggae acts (along with UB40) to have an American Billboard number one: "Close to You" in 1990. A duet with Roberta Flack, "Set the Night to Music", reached the American Top Ten in 1991. His duet with Shaggy in 1996, "That Girl", was also a hit in the United States, peaking at number 20.

In the latter half of his recording career, Priest favoured working alongside other artists, both established and up-and-coming. He has worked with Sly and Robbie, Drummie Zeb of Aswad, Shaggy, Beres Hammond, Jazzie B, Apache Indian, Roberta Flack, Shurwayne Winchester, Shabba Ranks, Robin Trower, and Lee Ritenour.

It was reported in some newspapers in the Birmingham area, including the Birmingham Mail on 13 March 2008, that Priest would be replacing Ali Campbell as the new lead singer of UB40, and that he had recorded a cover of Bob Marley's "I Shot the Sheriff" with the band, based on information from "an unnamed source close to the band". Priest had joined UB40 on tour in 2007, culminating in sold-out shows at the National Exhibition Centre in Solihull in December. Another local newspaper, the Express & Star that had reported that Priest would be the new UB40 frontman, included a statement from band spokesman Gerard Franklyn which contradicted the claim, stating: "Maxi is collaborating with the band to record material but he won't be the new lead singer, that will be Duncan Campbell, the brother of Ali and Robin Campbell. He will only be appearing with them for this new recording."

In 2012, Priest recorded a cover of Japanese band L'Arc-en-Ciel's song "Vivid Colors" for the band's English-language tribute album.

In 2013, Priest recorded a remix version of the Hindi song "Kabhi Jo Baadal Barse" originally sung by Arijit Singh. It was remixed by British Indian producer Rishi Rich.

His 2014 album Easy to Love entered the Billboard Top Reggae Albums Chart at number two.

== Sport ==
Priest played for non-League football club Southall, his son Marvin's team, in March 2003 when they needed players to fulfil a fixture due to an injury crisis at the club. Southall lost 3–0 to Feltham.

== Awards ==
Year	Award	Category	Work	Result
1994	Grammy Award	Best Reggae Album	Fe Real	Nominated
1997	Grammy Award	Best Reggae Album	Man with the Fun	Nominated
2021	Grammy Award	Best Reggae Album	It All Comes Back To Love	Nominated

== Discography ==
=== Studio albums ===
Year	Album	Chart positions				Certifications (sales thresholds)
Year	Album	UK	AUS	US	US R&B	Certifications (sales thresholds)
1985	You're Safe	—	—	—	—	
1986	Intentions	96	—	—	—	
1988	Maxi / Maxi Priest	25	67	108	—	UK: Gold
1990	Bonafide	11	25	47	16	UK: Gold
1992	Fe Real	60	130	191	46	
1996	Man with the Fun	—	52	108	43	
1999	CombiNation	—	—	—	—	
2005	2 the Max	—	—	—	—	
2007	Refused	—	—	—	—	
2014	Easy to Love	—	—	—	—	
2019	It All Comes Back to Love	—	—	—	—	
2020	United State of Mind	—	—	—	—	
"—" denotes releases that did not chart.

=== Compilations ===
Year	Album	Chart positions			Certifications
Year	Album	UK	AUS	US R&B	Certifications
1991	Best of Me	23	122	45	UK: Gold
2000	Collection	—	—	—	
2012	Maximum Collection	—	—	—	
"—" denotes releases that did not chart.

=== Singles ===
==== 1980s ====
Year	Title	Peak chart positions									Album
Year	Title	UK	IRE	NED	BEL (FL)	SWE	NOR	AUS	NZ	US	Album
1984	"Sensi" (split single with Papa Levi) (UK only)	—	—	—	—	—	—	—	—	—	You're Safe (as Maxi Priest & Caution)
1984	"Throw My Corn" (UK only)	—	—	—	—	—	—	—	—	—	You're Safe (as Maxi Priest & Caution)
1985	"Should I (Put My Trust in You)" (UK only)	—	—	—	—	—	—	—	—	—	You're Safe (as Maxi Priest & Caution)
1985	"Dancin' Mood" (UK only)	—	—	—	—	—	—	—	—	—	You're Safe (as Maxi Priest & Caution)
1986	"Strollin' On"	32	—	—	—	—	—	—	—	—	Intentions
1986	"In the Springtime (The Summertime Remix)" (UK only)	54	—	—	—	—	—	—	—	—	You're Safe
1986	"Crazy Love"	67	—	—	—	—	—	—	—	—	Intentions
1987	"Let Me Know" (UK only)	49	—	—	—	—	—	—	—	—	Intentions
1987	"Woman in You" (UK only)	83	—	—	—	—	—	—	—	—	Intentions
1987	"Some Guys Have All the Luck"	12	15	20	18	—	—	—	—	—	Maxi (EUR/JAP); Maxi Priest (US/CAN)
1988	"How Can We Ease the Pain?" (feat. Beres Hammond) (UK only)	41	—	—	—	—	—	—	—	—	Maxi (EUR/JAP); Maxi Priest (US/CAN)
1988	"Wild World"	5	5	7	5	17	3	8	5	25	Maxi (EUR/JAP); Maxi Priest (US/CAN)
1988	"Goodbye to Love Again"	57	—	—	—	—	—	—	—	—	Maxi (EUR/JAP); Maxi Priest (US/CAN)
"—" denotes releases that did not chart or were not released.

==== 1990s and 2000s ====
Year	Title	Peak chart positions										Certifications (sales thresholds)	Album
Year	Title	UK	IRE	NED	BEL (FL)	GER	AUT	SWI	AUS	NZ	US	Certifications (sales thresholds)	Album
1990	"Close to You"	7	26	5	9	4	8	10	2	2	1	UK: Silver; AUS: Gold; SWE: Gold; US: Gold	Bonafide
1990	"Peace Throughout the World"	41	—	52	—	—	—	—	87	13	—		Bonafide
1990	"Human Work of Art"	71	—	—	—	58	—	—	142	—	—		Bonafide
1991	"Just a Little Bit Longer"	62	—	—	—	—	—	—	181	—	62		Bonafide
1991	"Space in My Heart" (US promo only)	—	—	—	—	—	—	—	—	—	—		Bonafide
1992	"Groovin' in the Midnight"	50	—	—	—	—	—	—	120	31	63		Fe Real
1992	"Just Wanna Know / Fe Real" (feat. Apache Indian)	33	—	—	—	—	—	—	122	—	—		Fe Real
1993	"One More Chance"	40	—	—	—	—	—	—	—	38	—		Fe Real
1996	"That Girl" (with Shaggy)	15	—	35	—	52	29	29	7	10	20	AUS: Gold	Man with the Fun
1996	"Message in a Bottle" (Japan only)	—	—	—	—	—	—	—	—	—	—		Man with the Fun
1996	"Watching the World Go By"	36	—	—	—	97	—	—	88	—	—		Man with the Fun
1996	"Heartbreak Lover" (US promo only)	—	—	—	—	—	—	—	—	—	—		Man with the Fun
1997	"Happy Days"	—	—	—	—	—	—	—	187	—	—		Man with the Fun
1997	"Once Again It's Summertime"	—	—	—	—	—	—	—	—	—	—		The Best of Maxi Priest
1999	"Mary Got a Baby" (feat Beenie Man)	—	—	—	—	—	—	—	—	19	—		Combination
2000	"Back Together Again"	156	—	—	—	—	—	—	—	—	—		Combination
2004	"Fields / Like I Do"	—	—	—	—	—	—	—	—	—	—		2 the Max
2005	"Believe in Love"	—	—	—	—	—	—	—	—	—	—		2 the Max
"—" denotes releases that did not chart or were not released.

=== As featured artist ===
Year	Single	Peak positions					Album
Year	Single	UK	AUS	NZ	US	US R&B	Album
1991	"Housecall" (Shabba Ranks featuring Maxi Priest)	31	—	—	37	4	As Raw as Ever
1991	"Set the Night to Music" (Roberta Flack featuring Maxi Priest)	76	80	50	6	45	Set the Night to Music
1993	"Housecall" (reissue) (Shabba Ranks featuring Maxi Priest)	8	—	—	—	—	As Raw as Ever
1993	"Waiting in Vain" (Lee Ritenour with Maxi Priest)	65	—	—	—	54	Wes Bound
1997	"Love Somebody" (Yūji Oda with Maxi Priest)	—	—	—	—	—	Singles only
1998	"Rise Up" (as part of Jamaica United)	54	—	—	—	—	Singles only
2008	"That's What the Girls Like" (promo) (2Play featuring Maxi Priest)	—	—	—	—	—	Singles only
2013	"Kabhi Jo Baadal Barse" (Rishi Rich & Arijit Singh featuring Maxi Priest)	—	—	—	—	—	Jackpot
"—" denotes releases that did not chart or were not released.

=== Other charted songs ===
List of other charted songs, showing year released, chart positions and album name
Title	Year	Peak chart position	Album
Title	Year	JAM Air.	Album
"Smiling Faces"	1998	8	Strictly the Best Vol. 22
