= Boris Berman (musician) =

Russian pianist and pedagogue

- Born: April 3, 1948 (age 78); Moscow
- Education: Moscow Conservatory
- Occupations: Pianist and pedagogue

Boris Berman (born Moscow, April 3, 1948) is a Russian pianist and pedagogue.

== Biography ==
Berman was a student of Lev Oborin at the Moscow Conservatory. He made his debut in Moscow in 1965. He joined an early music ensemble, at the time the only one in Russia, as a harpsichordist. At the same time he worked with contemporary composers such as Alfred Schnittke and Edison Denisov. He played in the first Russian performances of works by Arnold Schoenberg, Karlheinz Stockhausen, Luciano Berio and György Ligeti. He also was a guest soloist with several orchestras, including the Moscow Philharmonic and the Moscow Chamber orchestras.

In 1973 he was permitted to leave the Soviet Union for Israel. In 1979 he migrated to the United States and has since taught at Boston University, Brandeis University, and Indiana University. He is currently the head of the Piano Department at the Yale School of Music. He was the Founding Director of the Music Spectrum concert series in Israel (1975–84) and of the Yale Music Spectrum series in the USA (1984–1997). In 2005, he was named an Honorary Professor of the Shanghai Conservatory and in 2013, an Honorary Professor of the Royal Danish Conservatory in Copenhagen.

He has appeared in numerous concerts and festivals around the world with artists and groups including Mischa Maisky, Heinz Holliger, Aurèle Nicolet, Shlomo Mintz, György Pauk, Ralph Kirshbaum, Frans Helmerson, Claude Frank, Peter Frankl, Natalia Gutman, Tokyo Quartet, Vermeer Quartet, The Netherland Wind Ensemble, Royal Concertgebouw Orchestra, Gewandhaus Orchestra, The Philharmonia (London), Toronto Symphony, Israel Philharmonic, Minnesota Orchestra, Detroit Symphony, Houston Symphony, Atlanta Symphony, St. Petersburg Philharmonic, and Royal Scottish National Orchestra.

He also regularly conducts master classes throughout the world and has been invited to join panels of jurors at U.S. and international competitions, including in Leeds (UK), Dublin (Ireland), Shanghai, and the Arthur Rubinstein Competition in Tel-Aviv.

== Notable recordings ==
He has released recordings on several record labels, including Philips, Deutsche Grammophon, and Melodiya. His releases include:

- 2 CD release of piano sonatas by Alexander Scriabin (Music & Arts)
- Recital of Shostakovich piano works (Ottavo recordings), which received the Edison Classic Award in the Netherlands
- 9 CD release of the complete piano works of Sergei Prokofiev (Chandos); he was the first pianist to record all of Prokofiev's solo piano works
- Recitals of Debussy, Stravinsky, and Schnittke, chamber music of Janáček, and a Concerto by Stravinsky (with Orchestre de la Suisse Romande under Neeme Järvi (all released by Chandos)
- Debussy for Children (Ottavo recordings)
- 2 releases of works for prepared piano by John Cage (Naxos), which was named the Top Recording by the BBC Music Magazine
- Piano Quintets of Shostakovich and Schnittke with the Vermeer Quartet (Naxos), which was nominated for a Grammy
- A recording of Scott Joplin's Ragtimes (Ottavo)
- Sequenza IV for piano as part of the Naxos collection of complete Sequenzas by Luciano Berio
- Brahms Sonatas with the cellist Clive Greensmith (Biddulph), in which he used an 1867 Bechstein piano

== Written works ==
He has also written several works on piano technique and piano recording, including:

- "Notes from the Pianist's Bench" (Yale University Press) published in 2000
- "Prokofiev's Piano Sonatas: A Guide for the Listener and the Performer" (Yale University Press) published in 2008
- A bilingual edition of the scores of Prokofiev's piano sonatas (Shanghai Press) published in 2011
