= Eleanor Warren (cellist) =

British cellist and music producer

- Born: Eleanor Catherine Warren; 15 June 1919; London
- Died: 25 August 2005 (aged 86)
- Known for: Cellist and music producer
- Spouse: Walter Susskind

Eleanor Catherine Warren MBE or Eleanor Catherine Rutherford Warren (15 June 1919 – 25 August 2005) was a British cellist and music producer.

== Life ==
Warren was born in London in 1919; her father was William Rutherford Warren. Her Jewish German mother, Elsa Julia, née Seligman, was a cellist. Warren was playing as a small child and she was enrolled in the London Cello School. Warren was the youngest ever pupil at the age of five. (Jacqueline du Pré was to also study at the age of five in the 1950s). By the time she left the school as a teenager she had met many important musicians.

In 1936 she started the first phase of her career when Gregor Piatigorsky assisted her in getting her first concert appearance as a cellist. In 1940, the impresario Harold Holt often included her as a supporting artist to the tenor Richard Tauber, with whom she toured the country. Tauber wrote for her a Ballade for 'cello and piano which they often played together on the tour. By the time of the second world war she was a member of the Ebsworth Quartet and they would tour factories to entertain the workers, play at the National Gallery and in air-raid shelters. She married Walter Susskind in 1943. After the war she continued to play and to teach. The quartet ended in the 1950s and she joined a trio until a back injury indicated a change of direction. She divorced her husband in 1953. She subsequently worked with the English Chamber Orchestra, the London Mozart Players, the Zorian Quartet and the English Baroque Ensemble. She also took part in film sessions with Malcolm Arnold, Jacques Loussier and Richard Rodney Bennett.

She joined the BBC in 1964 and in 1969 she organised a series of broadcasts from a music venue of her own devising. She had identified that the restored St John's Church in Smith Square was an ideal venue for BBC radio concerts. One of its advantages was its distance from traffic noise including underground trains. Each Monday lunchtime the music concerts would be broadcast on BBC Radio until the church was rebuilt.

Warren is credited with suggesting the formation of an important trio. She encouraged the collaboration between the pianist Peter Frankl, the violinist György Pauk and the American cellist Ralph Kirshbaum to form the Pauk–Kirshbaum–Frankl Piano Trio.

Warren eventually left the BBC leaving as the head of BBC Radio music programmes. She took a number of important posts. She was appointed MBE in 1991.

The BBC later commissioned Fourteen Little Pictures by James MacMillan to mark the 25th anniversary of Pauk–Kirshbaum–Frankl Piano Trio. It was played by them at the Wigmore Hall in 1997. Warren died in 2005.
