= Zorian =

Zorian and Zoryan are surnames of Armenian origin. People with those surnames include:

- Ashot Zorian (1905–1970), Turkish-born Egyptian painter of Armenian ethnicity
- Emilia Zoryan (active from 2011), American film actress
- Olive Zorian (1916–1965), English violinist
- Stepan Zorian (also known as Rostom; 1867–1919), Armenian political activist
- Stepan Zoryan (1889–1967), Soviet Armenian writer

== See also ==
- Zorian Quartet, a string quartet founded by Olive Zorian
- Zoryan Institute, an American non-profit organization and think tank established 1982 in Cambridge, Massachusetts
