= Sharon Forrester =

Jamaican reggae singer

- Born: 1956 (age 68–69); Kingston, Jamaica
- Genres: Reggae, lovers rock
- Occupation: Singer-songwriter
- Instrument: Vocals
- Years active: Early 1970s–present
- Labels: Ashanti, VP

Sharon Forrester (born 1956) is a Jamaican reggae singer who had success in the 1970s and 1990s.

== Biography ==
Born in Kingston, Jamaica in 1956, Forrester was born into a musical family and began singing at an early age, singing in church choirs from the age of six. After performing to tourists on Jamaica's north coast, she appeared on television alongside Richard Ace, and was introduced to Geoffrey Chung. She had success in 1973 with the single "Silly Wasn't I", produced by Chung and backed by his Now Generation Band, and performed alongside The Wailers at the Ethiopian Benefit Concert later that year. Chung also produced her debut album, Sharon, mostly recorded in the United Kingdom in 1974 due to a musicians strike in Jamaica. While in the UK, she appeared in the BFI film Moon Over the Alley alongside Danny Ray. In the autumn of 1974 she was part of the Jamaica Showcase international tour, along with Dennis Brown, The Maytals, and Cynthia Richards, and she also appeared on the UK television show Aquarius, performing a version of George Harrison's "Here Comes the Sun". For much of the next twenty years she only recorded intermittently, and worked occasionally as a backing vocalist, but returned with the "Love Inside" single in 1994, which was a top 50 hit in the UK, and the This Time album in 1996. Since then she has provided guest vocals or backing vocals on recordings by other artists including Alpha Blondy, Burning Spear, Jimmy Cliff, The Heptones, and Yami Bolo.

== Albums ==
- Sharon (1974), Ashanti
- This Time (1996), VP
