= Martin Jarvis =

Martin Jarvis may refer to:

- Martin Jarvis (actor) (born 1941), British actor
- Martin Jarvis (conductor) (born 1951), Australian conductor and lecturer in music
- Chris Jarvis (presenter) (born 1970), English actor, presenter and writer; full name, Martin Christopher Jarvis
