= Olive Zorian =

British violinist (1916–1965)

- Olive Zorian (left) playing violin I in the Zorian Quartet

Background information
- Born: 16 March 1916; Manchester, England
- Died: 17 May 1965 (aged 49) London, England
- Genres: Classical
- Instrument: Violin
- Formerly of: Zorian Quartet

Olive Nevart Zorian (16 March 1916 in Manchester – 17 May 1965 in London) was an English classical violinist.

She was the youngest daughter of Samuel Hovannes Zorian and Ada Mary Zorian. Samuel was an Armenian hosiery manufacturer and musician from Diyarbakir, Southeastern Anatolia, Turkey, who had been imprisoned by the Turkish authorities in the 1890s as a political activist, and who thereafter relocated to Manchester, England. The family settled in Manchester and were prominent cotton merchant businessmen. Ada (née Rushton) came from Birmingham.

== Early life and education ==
In the 1920s Samuel and Ada with their children moved to Lytham St Annes. Ada was a Quaker, and they opened a vegetarian guest house there.

From 1932, Olive studied at the Royal Manchester College of Music under Arthur Catterall, funded first by a scholarship from the College and later by one from Lancashire County Council of £36 a year. When only 16 years old, she was invited by Sir Henry Wood to play at the Promenade season at the Queens Hall, Manchester. She continued her studies at the Royal Academy of Music. In 1937, she was awarded as student prize a violin bow made by J & A Beare, the first of many awards and prizes. Also in 1937, a string quartet which consisted of her (violin I), Marjorie Lavers (violin II), Susan Davies (viola) and Vivian Joseph (cello) won the Sir Edward Cooper Prize for ensemble playing.

Zorian then studied violin with Georges Enescu in Paris and with Szymon Goldberg in Amsterdam.

== Career ==
In 1938, she was leader (concertmaster) of an orchestra assembled by Rudolph Dolmetsch.

She performed five times as soloist at The Proms, in London, 1940–47, at the invitation of Sir Henry Wood. In one of those performances, in 1943, she gave the first performance in England of Saudade for violin and orchestra by South African composer Arnold van Wyk (1916–83).

In 1942, she founded the Zorian String Quartet, in which she played first violin. The other founding members were Marjorie Lavers (violin II), Winifred Copperwheat (1905–76, viola) and Norina Semino (cello). The quartet gave the premiere performances of, and made the first recordings of, several string quartets by English composers, including Benjamin Britten and Michael Tippett, and gave the English premieres of others. The quartet was also famous for its performances of string quartets by Bartok and Bloch, as well as modern music.

When the re-formed Zorian String Quartet diminished its activity, she led the English Opera Group Orchestra 1952–57, including performances at the Aldeburgh Festival. She was a distinguished violinist in the Julian Bream Consort, which was responsible for a revival of Elizabethan music. She made recordings with both those groups as well as with the Zorian Quartet. As a soloist she gave numerous recitals, and played concertos with leading British orchestras. In 1961, she was leader of the Hoffnung Symphony Orchestra at the Hoffnung Astronautical Music Festival.

In 1985, her former husband John Amis wrote, in his autobiography Amiscellany:

Olive's own playing was not virtuosic, though she could most capably negotiate things like Mozart concertos, the first fiddle-parts of Britten, Bartók and Tippett, as well as Stravinsky's Duo Concertant. Her strongest point was her instinctive musicianship and, above all, her ability to float and spin a line. You can hear the best of her in the old 78 rpm recordings of Britten [namely, his Second String Quartet] and Tippett Second String Quartets and, on LP, the original recordings of Britten's Saint Nicolas and The Turn of the Screw.

== Personal life ==
In 1948, she married broadcaster and classical music critic John Amis (1922–2013). The marriage was dissolved in 1955, the same year in which her father died.

== Death and legacy ==
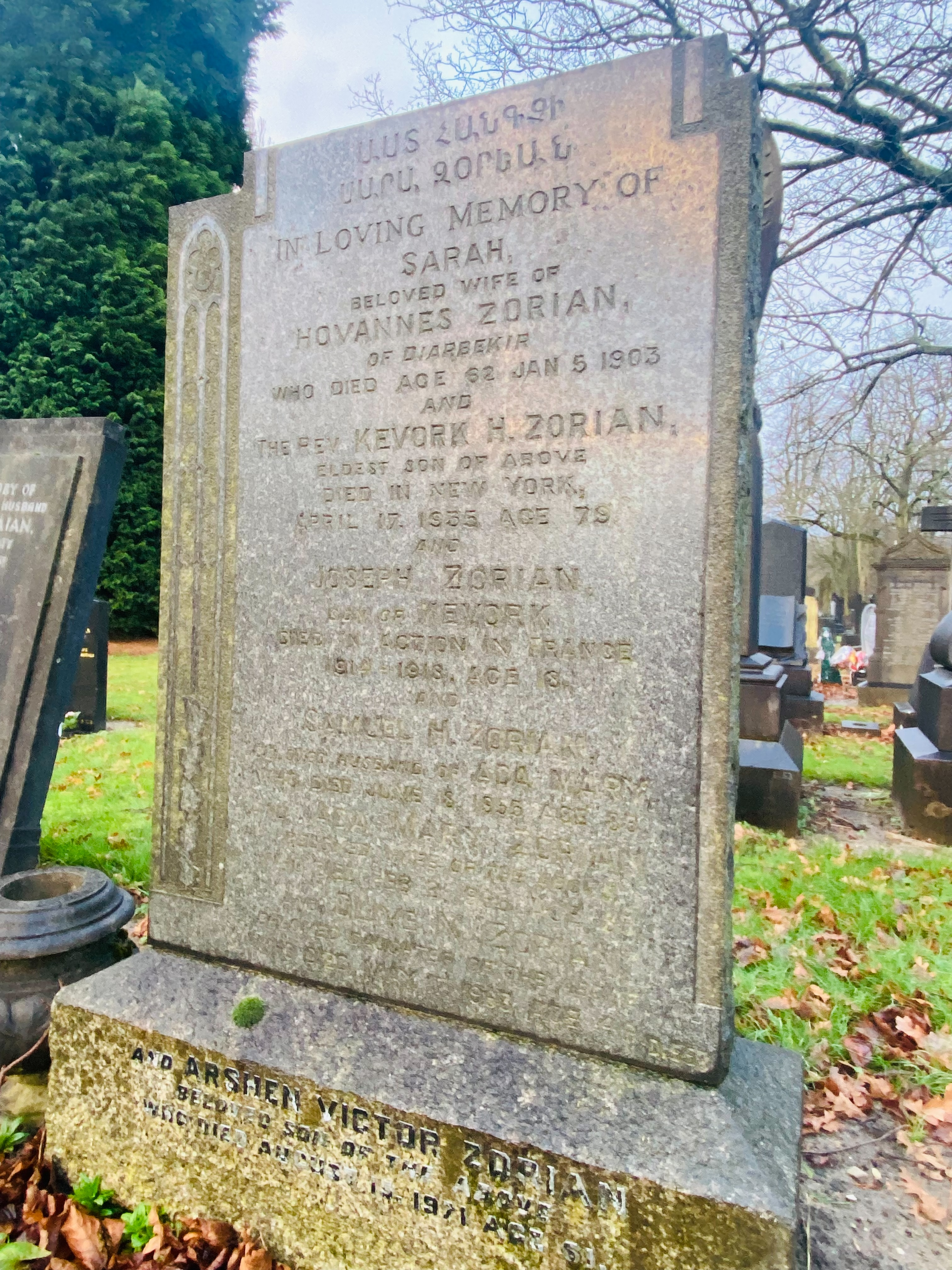
The grave of Olive Zorian and her family in Southern Cemetery, Manchester

Olive Zorian died of cancer in hospital in London in 1965. Her name is inscribed in the Book of Remembrance in the Musicians' Chapel at St Sepulchre-without-Newgate, London.

For many years Zorian played on a 1721 Gagliano violin, which upon her death was bequeathed to the daughter of Arthur Catterall, her former tutor, to whom it originally belonged. Later, a fund in her name was set up to acquire it for the Royal Manchester College of Music for students to borrow for a year each. Jonathon Sparey of Cumberland was the first recipient. Two memorial concerts in November 1966 (the first in London on the 23rd, featuring Benjamin Britten, Peter Pears, Julian Bream, Helen Watts, Manoug Parikian, Norman Del Mar and Harold Lester; the second in Manchester, featuring John Ogdon and his wife Brenda Lucas, Elizabeth Harwood, Rodney Friend and Isobel Flinn) raised more than the necessary amount. The instrument was stolen in 1969 and has not been recovered.
