= Nomanisan Island =

Nomanisan Island and Nomansan Island are puns on the well-known phrase "No man is an Iland [sic]". Written by John Donne, the phrase is quoted from "Meditation XVII", a section of his work Devotions upon Emergent Occasions published in 1624. Various locations, both real-world and fictitious, have been named after the play on words.

- Nomanisan Island was a small island in Lake Kittamaqundi, an artificial lake in Columbia, Maryland, United States. In 2011, the Columbia Association converted the island into a peninsula in order to reduce sediment buildup by creating a forebay.
- Nomanisan is a fictional volcanic island where much of the events of the 2004 Pixar film The Incredibles and the eponymous video game take place.
- Nomansan Island is a fictional place in the novel The Mysterious Benedict Society and the television series of the same name.

== See also ==
- No man is an island (disambiguation)
