= No Man Is an Island =

No Man Is an Island may refer to:

- "No man is an island", originally "No man is an Iland", a famous line from Devotions upon Emergent Occasions, a 1624 prose work by English poet John Donne
- No Man Is an Island (film), a 1962 war film
- No Man is an Island (2018 film), a mockumentary by Nash Ang
- No Man Is an Island (album), the 1972 debut album of reggae singer Dennis Brown
- No Man Is an Island, a 1955 book by the Trappist monk Thomas Merton
- "No Man Is an Island", a 1953 episode of the Hallmark Hall of Fame, about the life of John Donne
- "No Man Is an Island", a song by Tenth Avenue North
- "No Man Is an Island", a song by Losers
- No-Man, an English art-pop band founded in 1987 as No Man Is an Island (Except the Isle of Man)
- "No Man Is an Island" (The Script song) from the album Freedom Child

== See also ==
- "No Man Is an Iland", the opening and closing song on the album Grace by Ketil Bjørnstad
- Nomanisan Island
