= Winifred Copperwheat =

English violist (1905 - 1976)

Background information
- Born: Winifred May Copperwheat; 10 October 1905; Fulham, London, England
- Died: 23 February 1976 (aged 70) Hounslow, London, England
- Genres: Classical
- Occupations: Performer and teacher
- Instrument: Viola
- Formerly of: Zorian Quartet

Winifred May Copperwheat (10 October 1905 – 23 February 1976) was an English classical viola player and teacher.

In 1921 she was awarded the Dove Scholarship to study violin at the Royal Academy of Music with Spencer Dyke. At the RAM she was encouraged by the principal, Sir John Blackwood McEwen to concentrate on the viola, which she then studied with Lionel Tertis. Tertis later said after one of her recitals, that she had "played like an angel".

As soloist, she gave the premiere performance of several works, including:

- Theodore Holland, Ellingham Marshes for viola and orchestra; with the London Symphony Orchestra under Henry Wood at The Proms in 1940
- Theodore Holland, a composition for viola and piano; with Iris Greep, 1941 (Note: This may have been Holland's Suite in D for viola and piano (1938).)
- Priaulx Rainier, Viola Sonata; with Antony Hopkins (piano) at the National Gallery, London in 1946
- Frank Stiles, Four Pieces for Solo Viola (1959), composed for her
- Frank Stiles, Viola Concerto No. 1, composed for and dedicated to her (1955, first performance 1962)
- David Wynne, Sonata for Viola and Piano (1951); 1st Performance: Macnaghten Concerts (1955) with Hans Redlich (piano).

She played in several chamber music combinations; including the Zorian String Quartet, of which she was a founding member. She participated in several premiere performances and recordings by the Zorian Quartet.

She was Professor of Viola at the Royal Academy of Music from 1940 until her death in 1976. In 1971, she pointed out to musicologist and violist Martin Jarvis, one of her students, some problems with the published editions of the Bach cello suites. That observation eventually led to his hypothesis that they had been composed by Anna Magdalena Bach and not, as commonly supposed, by her husband Johann Sebastian Bach.

She wrote a book for beginners viola students, The First-Year Viola Method.

Copperwheat played on a ‘Tertis Model’, Arthur Richardson viola of 1938.

Her name is inscribed in the Book of Remembrance in the Musicians' Chapel at St Sepulchre-without-Newgate, London.
