= String Quartet No. 2 (Britten) =

Composition for string quartet by Benjamin Britten

String Quartet
- No. 2
- by Benjamin Britten
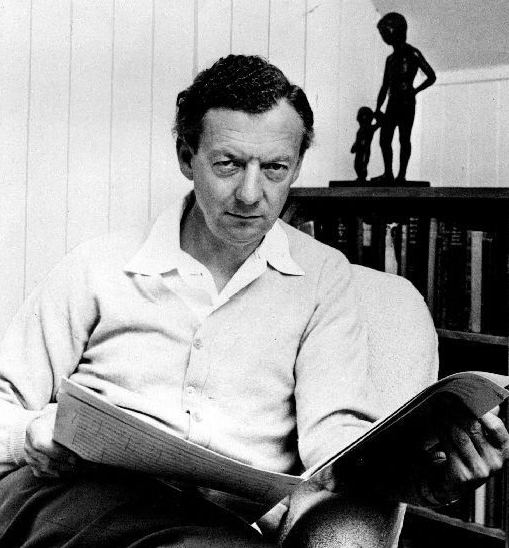
- Britten in the mid-1960s
- Opus: 36
- Composed: 1945
- Dedication: Mrs J. L. Behrend
- Movements: Three

Premiere
- Date: 21 November 1945
- Location: Wigmore Hall, London
- Performers: Zorian Quartet

String Quartet No. 2 in C major, Op. 36, by English composer Benjamin Britten, was written in 1945. It was composed in Snape, Suffolk and London, and completed on 14 October. The first performance was by the Zorian Quartet in the Wigmore Hall, London on 21 November 1945, in a concert to mark the exact 250th anniversary of the death of English composer Henry Purcell (1659–95). The work was commissioned by and is dedicated to Mary ("Mrs J. L.") Behrend, a patron of the arts; Britten donated most of his fee towards famine relief in India.

The Zorian Quartet made the first recording of the work, in October 1946. It occupies seven sides of a four-disc 78rpm album. On the eighth side is Purcell's Fantasia upon One Note Z.745, with Britten playing the sustained middle C drone on second viola; the only recording on which he played viola, his favourite string instrument.

Broadcaster and classical music critic John Amis (1922–2013), husband of Olive Zorian 1948–55, recalled of the first rehearsals:

Ben[jamin Britten] and me had to sit on the floor in me and my wife’s flat following the score of his second string quartet in rehearsals because me and my wife only had four chairs and the quartet had to use them.

== Structure ==
The quartet is in three movements:

1. Allegro calmo, senza rigore
2. Vivace
3. Chacony: sostenuto

The first movement is in a kind of sonata form, unusual in that the first and second subjects (themes) give rise to a third subject, all involving the interval of a tenth.

The second movement has been described as "night music", but is very different in character to that of the night music of Béla Bartók. All four instruments play with mutes.

The third movement is longer than the other two movements combined. Its title "Chacony" refers back to Purcell, who used that name for the musical form more often called chaconne or passacaglia. It consists of a theme (a nine-bar unit) and 21 variations, divided into four sections by solo cadenzas for the cello, viola and first violin. In a programme note for the premiere, Britten wrote: "The sections may be said to review the theme from (a) harmonic, (b) rhythmic, (c) melodic, and (d) formal aspects".

A typical performance takes about 28–32 minutes.

== Recordings ==
- 1946 – Zorian Quartet, His Master's Voice 78 rpm C.3539
- 1963 – Amadeus Quartet, Argo ZRG 5372
- 1965 – Fidelio Quartet, Pye Golden Guinea Records LP GSGC I4025
- 1971 – Janáček Quartet, Supraphon SUA ST 50960
- 1972 – Allegri Quartet, Decca LP SXL 6564
- 1978 – Amadeus Quartet, Decca LP SXL 6893; remastered 1990 London Records CD 425 715-2
- 1981 – Alberni Quartet, CRD Records LP CRD 1095; rereleased 1989, CRD Records CD CRD 3395
- 1984 – Sequoia Quartet, Music & Arts CD CD-740 SKU: 017685074028
- 1986 – Endellion Quartet, His Master's Voice LP E 2705021/31/41* 1990 – Britten Quartet
- 1992 – Wihan Quartet, Clara CD 57 013-2 / Popron 57 013-2
- 1998 – Maggini Quartet, Naxos CD 8.553883
- 1998 – Sorrel Quartet, Chandos CD CHAN 9664
- 2002 – Brodsky Quartet, Challenge CD CC 72099
- 2005 – Belcea Quartet, EMI Classics CD 7243 5 57968 2 0
- 2010 – Elias String Quartet, Sonimage SON 10903 – String Quartets Nos 2 & 3; Three Divertimenti for string quartet
- 2013 – Takács Quartet, Hyperion CD CDA68004
- 2017 – Emerson String Quartet, Decca CD B0026509-02
