= Walter Susskind =

Czech-born British conductor and pianist

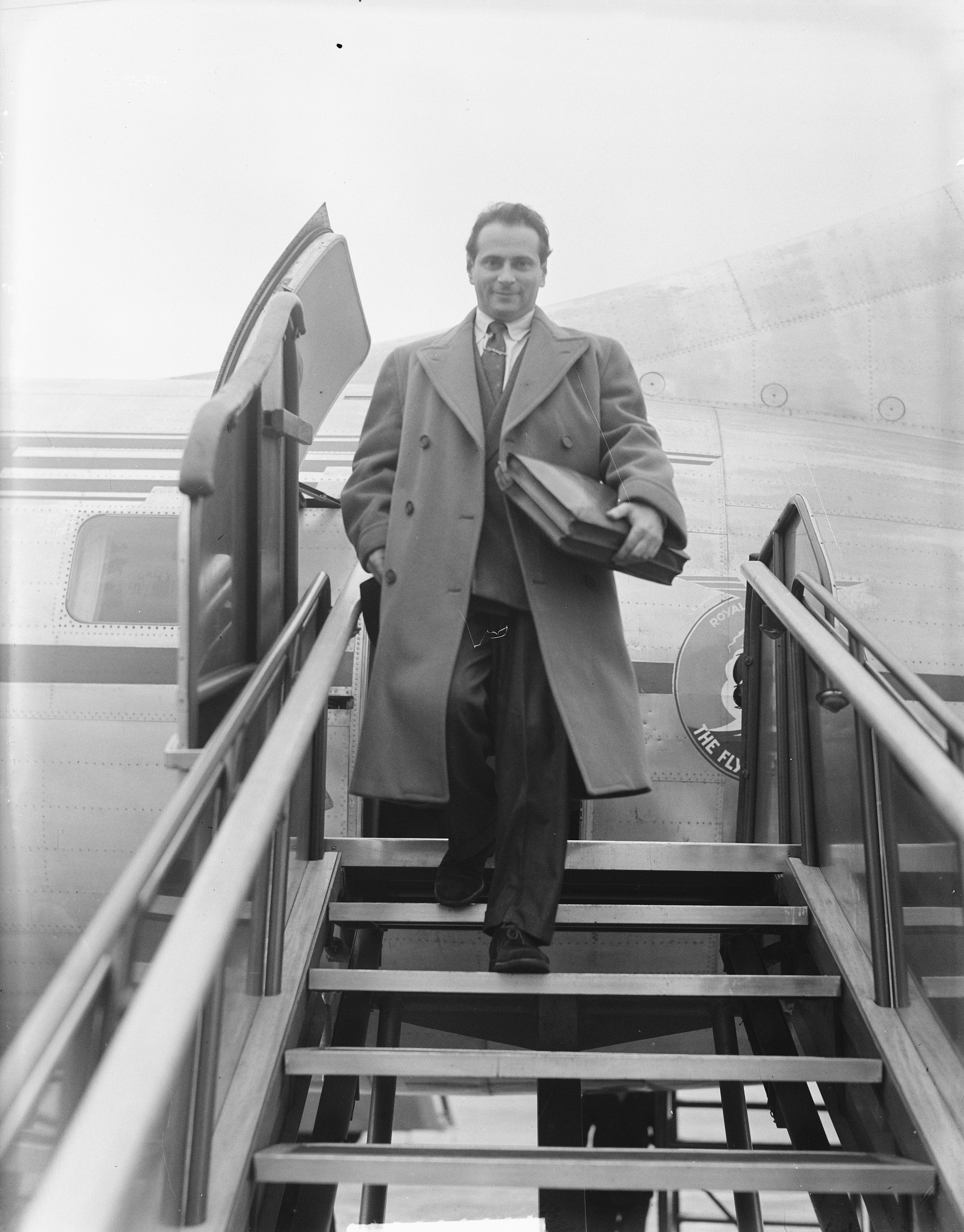
Walter Susskind (1950)

Jan Walter Susskind (1 May 1913 – 25 March 1980) was a Czech-born British conductor, teacher and pianist. He began his career in his native Prague and travelled to London in March 1939 when Germany invaded Czechoslovakia. He worked for substantial periods in Australia, Canada and the United States, as a conductor and teacher.

== Biography ==
Süsskind was born in Prague. His father was a Viennese music critic and his Czech mother was a piano teacher. At the State Conservatorium he studied under the composer Josef Suk, the son-in-law of Dvořák. He later studied conducting under George Szell, and became Szell's assistant at the German Opera, Prague, making his conducting debut there with La traviata; early in his career, he was often known as H. W. Süsskind (H for Hans or Hanuš). His younger brother, Charles Susskind, became a bioengineering professor and technological historian.

Susskind was giving a piano recital in Amsterdam in March 1939 when Germany occupied Czechoslovakia, and his mother advised him not to return home. (She was later interned in Theresienstadt but survived the war.) With the help of a British journalist and consular officials, he arrived in Britain as a refugee. He formed the Czech Trio, a chamber ensemble in which he was the pianist. Encouraged by Jan Masaryk, the Czech ambassador in London, the trio obtained many engagements.

In 1942 Susskind joined the Carl Rosa Opera Company as a conductor, working with singers such as Heddle Nash and Joan Hammond, and married (1943–1953) the British cellist Eleanor Catherine Warren. In 1944 he made his first recording for Walter Legge of EMI, conducting Liu's arias from Turandot with Hammond.

After the war, Susskind became a naturalised British citizen, and though he spent much of his subsequent career outside Britain, he said he would never dream of giving up his British citizenship.

Susskind's first appointment as musical director was to the Scottish Orchestra, where he served from 1946 to 1952. He and his wife divorced in 1953. From 1953 to 1955 he was the conductor of the Melbourne Symphony Orchestra (then known as the Victorian Symphony Orchestra). After free-lancing in Israel and South America he was appointed to head the Toronto Symphony Orchestra (TSO) from 1956 to 1965.

In 1960 he founded the National Youth Orchestra of Canada. In 1962 he gave the World premiere of the Four Epigrams for Symphony Orchestra by Rudi Martinus van Dijk with the CBC Symphony as part of the CBC's National School Broadcast series Finding Out about Music. While with the TSO he taught conducting at The Royal Conservatory of Music where among his pupils were Milton Barnes and Rudy Toth. As he was leaving his post at the TSO, he was featured in a CFTO television special, "Inside the Toronto Symphony", produced and directed by Peter Macfarlane.

From 1968 to 1975 he was conductor of the St. Louis Symphony Orchestra with which he made more than 200 recordings. During his seven-year tenure with St. Louis, he taught across the Mississippi River at Southern Illinois University Edwardsville. He was also closely involved with the Mississippi River Festival, an annually recurring outdoors crossover concert series organised by the local university.

Susskind served as artistic advisor of the Cincinnati Symphony Orchestra from 1978 until his death in 1980.

On May 3, 1971, Susskind returned to the New York City Opera to conduct Leoš Janáček's Makropulos Case.

Susskind died in Berkeley, California, at the age of 66. His personal archives document his career as a conductor, piano accompanist and avant-garde composer. The BBC Radio 3 program Music Matters broadcast 29 Jan. 2022 an interview with Susskind's widow Janis, in the process of transferring these materials to the Exilarte Centre, University of Music and Performing Arts, Vienna.

== Discography (selection) ==
External audio
- You may hear Walter Susskind with Glenn Gould and the CBC Symphony Orchestra in: Wolfgang Amadeus Mozart's: Piano Concerto No. 24 in C minor, K. 491 in 1962; Here on Archive.org

Recordings include:

- Bartók – Bluebeard's Castle, Op. 11, Sz.48 (Judith Hellwig; Endre Koréh; Ernö Lorsy); New Symphony Orchestra
- Bruch – Violin Concerto in G minor, Op. 26 (Yehudi Menuhin, violin; Philharmonia Orchestra)
- Dvořák – Cello Concerto in B minor, Op. 104 (Zara Nelsova, cello; Saint Louis Symphony Orchestra)
- Dvorak – Piano Concerto in G minor, Op. 33 (Rudolf Firkušný, piano; Saint Louis Symphony Orchestra)
- Dvorak – Violin Concerto in A minor, Op. 53 (Ruggiero Ricci, violin; Saint Louis Symphony Orchestra)
- Dvorak – Romance for Violin and Orchestra in F minor, Op. 11 (Ruggiero Ricci, violin; Saint Louis Symphony Orchestra)
- Dvorak – Mazurek for Violin and Orchestra in E minor, Op. 49 (Ruggiero Ricci, violin; Saint Louis Symphony Orchestra)
- Dvorak – Silent Woods (Waldesruhe) for Cello & Orchestra, Op. 68 (Zara Nelsova, cello; Saint Louis Symphony Orchestra)
- Dvorak – Rondo in G minor for Cello and Orchestra, Op. 68 (Zara Nelsova, cello; Saint Louis Symphony Orchestra)
- Handel – Messiah (London Philharmonic Orchestra)
- Holst – The Planets (Saint Louis Symphony Orchestra)
- Mozart – Motet "Exsultate, jubilate", K. 165 (Elisabeth Schwarzkopf, soprano; Philharmonia Orchestra)
- Mozart – Piano Concerto No 20, K. 466 (Artur Schnabel, piano; Philharmonia Orchestra)
- Mozart – Piano Concerto No 24, K. 491 (Artur Schnabel; Philharmonia Orchestra)
- Mozart – Piano Concerto No 24, K. 491 (Glenn Gould, piano; CBC Symphony Orchestra)
- Prokofiev – Chout ballet suite, Op. 21a (London Symphony Orchestra)
- Rachmaninoff – Piano Concerto No. 3 in D minor, Op. 30 (Leonard Pennario, piano; Philharmonia Orchestra)
- Saint-Saens – Cello Concerto No. 1 in a minor, Op. 33 (Pierre Fournier, cello; Philharmonia Orchestra)
- Sibelius – Violin Concerto in D minor, Op. 47 (Ginette Neveu, violin; Philharmonia Orchestra)
- Smetana – Má vlast, Overture and Dances from The Bartered Bride (Saint Louis Symphony Orchestra)
- Richard Strauss – Also sprach Zarathustra (Saint Louis Symphony Orchestra)
