= Dennis Brown =

Jamaican reggae singer (1957–1999)

Dennis Brown CD
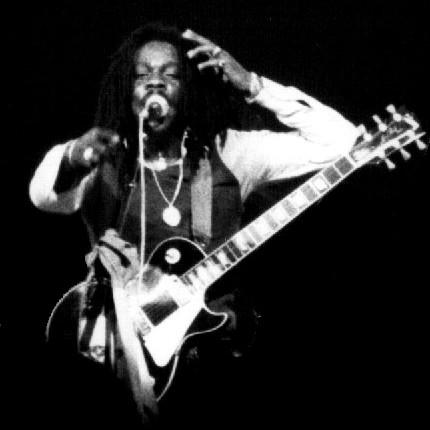
- Dennis Brown performing in 1980

Background information
- Also known as: The Crown Prince of Reggae
- Born: Dennis Emmanuel Brown; 1 February 1957; Kingston, Jamaica
- Died: 1 July 1999 (aged 42) Kingston, Jamaica
- Genres: Reggae; lovers rock
- Occupation: Singer-songwriter
- Instruments: Vocals, guitar
- Years active: 1968–1999
- Labels: Studio One; Trojan; Harry J; Joe Gibbs; A&M; DEB; Yvonne's Special; Greensleeves; Shanachie; Heartbeat; VP; Real Authentic Sound

Dennis Emmanuel Brown CD (1 February 1957 – 1 July 1999) was a Jamaican reggae singer. During his prolific career, which began in the late 1960s when he was aged eleven, he recorded more than 75 albums and was one of the major stars of lovers rock, a subgenre of reggae. Bob Marley cited Brown as his favourite singer, dubbing him "The Crown Prince of Reggae", and Brown would prove influential on future generations of reggae singers.

== Biography ==
=== Early life and career ===
Dennis Brown was born on February 1, 1957, in Victoria Jubilee Hospital in Kingston, Jamaica. His father Arthur was a scriptwriter, actor, and journalist, and he grew up in a large tenement yard between North Street and King Street in Kingston with his parents, three elder brothers and a sister, although his mother died in the 1960s. He began his singing career at the age of nine, while still at junior school, with an end-of-term concert the first time he performed in public, although he had been interested in music from an even earlier age, and as a youngster was a fan of American balladeers such as Brook Benton, Sam Cooke, Frank Sinatra, and Dean Martin. He cited Nat King Cole as one of his greatest early influences. He regularly hung around JJ's record store on Orange Street in the rocksteady era and his relatives and neighbours would often throw Brown pennies to hear him sing in their yard. Brown's first professional appearance came at the age of eleven, when he visited "Tit for Tat" a local West Kingston Nightclub where his brother Basil was performing a comedy routine, and where he made a guest appearance with the club's resident group, the Fabulous Falcons (a group that included Cynthia Richards, David "Scotty" Scott, and Noel Brown). On the strength of this performance he was asked to join the group as a featured vocalist. When the group performed at a JLP conference at the National Arena, Brown sang two songs – Desmond Dekker's "Unity" and Johnnie Taylor's "Ain't That Loving You" – and after the audience showered the stage with money, he was able to buy his first suit with the proceeds. Bandleader Byron Lee performed on the same bill, and was sufficiently impressed with Brown to book him to perform on package shows featuring visiting US artists, where he was billed as the "Boy Wonder".

As a young singer Brown was influenced by older contemporaries such as Delroy Wilson (whom he later cited as the single greatest influence on his style of singing), Errol Dunkley, John Holt, Ken Boothe, and Bob Andy. Brown's first recording was an original song called "Lips of Wine" for producer Derrick Harriott, but when this was not released, he recorded for Clement "Coxsone" Dodd's Studio One label, and his first session yielded the single "No Man is an Island", recorded when Brown was aged twelve and released in late 1969. The single received steadily increasing airplay for almost a year before becoming a huge hit throughout Jamaica. Brown recorded up to a dozen sessions for Dodd, amounting to around thirty songs, and also worked as a backing singer on sessions by other artists, including providing harmonies along with Horace Andy and Larry Marshall on Alton Ellis's Sunday Coming album. Brown was advised by fellow Studio One artist Ellis to learn guitar to help with his songwriting, and after convincing Dodd to buy him an instrument, was taught the basics by Ellis. These Studio One recordings were collected on two albums, No Man is an Island and If I Follow my Heart (the title track penned by Alton Ellis), although Brown had left Studio One before either was released. He went on to record for several producers including Lloyd Daley ("Baby Don't Do It" and "Things in Life"), Prince Buster ("One Day Soon" and "If I Had the World"), and Phil Pratt ("Black Magic Woman", "Let Love In", and "What About the Half"), before returning to work with Derrick Harriott, recording a string of popular singles including "Silhouettes", "Concentration", "He Can't Spell", and "Musical Heatwave", with the pick of these tracks collected on the Super Reggae and Soul Hits album in 1973. Brown also recorded for Vincent "Randy" Chin ("Cheater"), Dennis Alcapone ("I Was Lonely"), and Herman Chin Loy ("It's Too Late" and "Song My Mother Used to Sing") among others, with Brown still at school at this stage of his career.

=== International success ===
In 1972, Brown began an association that would result in his breakthrough as an internationally successful artist; He was asked by Joe Gibbs to record an album for him, and one of the tracks recorded as a result, "Money in my Pocket", was a hit with UK reggae audiences and quickly became a favourite of his live performances. This original version of "Money in my Pocket" was in fact produced by Winston "Niney" Holness on behalf of Gibbs, with musical backing from the Soul Syndicate. In the same year, Brown performed as part of a Christmas morning showcase in Toronto, along with Delroy Wilson, Scotty, Errol Dunkley, and the Fabulous Flames, where he was billed as the "Boy Wonder of Jamaica" and was considered the star of the show in a local newspaper review. The song's popularity in the UK was established with the release of a deejay version, "A-So We Stay (Money in Hand)", credited to Big Youth and Dennis Brown, which outsold the original single and topped the Jamaican singles chart. Brown and Holness became close, even sharing a house in Pembroke Hall. Brown followed this with another collaboration with Holness on "Westbound Train", which was the biggest Jamaican hit of summer 1973, and Brown's star status was confirmed when he was voted Jamaica's top male vocalist in a poll by Swing magazine the same year. Brown followed this success with "Cassandra" and "No More Will I Roam", and tracks such as "Africa" and "Love Jah", displaying Brown's Rastafari beliefs, became staples on London's sound system scene. In 1973, Brown was hospitalized, due to fatigue caused by overwork; at the time, rumours spread that he only had one lung and had only a week to live, or had contracted tuberculosis. He was advised to take an extended break from performing, and concentrated instead on his college studies.

Brown returned to music and toured the United Kingdom for the first time in late summer 1974 as part of a Jamaican showcase, along with Cynthia Richards, Al Brown, Sharon Forrester, and The Maytals, after which he was invited to stay on for further dates (where he was backed by The Cimarons, staying in the UK for another three months. While in the UK, he recorded for the first time since his hospitalization, working with producer Sydney Crooks, and again backed by the Cimarons. While Brown was in the UK, Gibbs released an album collecting recordings Brown made earlier in Jamaica, released as The Best of Dennis Brown, and Brown's first single to get a proper UK release was issued on the Synda label – "No More Will I Roam". He returned to Jamaica for Christmas, but six weeks later was back in the UK, now with Holness in tow as his business manager, to negotiate a record deal with Trojan Records, the first Brown album to be released as a result being Just Dennis, although the pair would be left out of pocket after Trojan's collapse and subsequent buyout by Saga Records. On their return to Jamaica, Brown and Holness resumed recording in earnest with tracks for a new album, including "So Long Rastafari", "Boasting", and "Open the Gate". During 1975, Brown also recorded one-off sessions for Sonia Pottinger ("If You leave Me") and Bunny Lee ("So Much Pain", a duet with Johnny Clarke), and the first recordings began to appear on Brown's new DEB Music label. In the wake of the Trojan collapse, Brown and Holness arranged a deal with local independent label owners Castro Brown (who ran Morpheus Records) and Larry Lawrence (Ethnic Fight) to distribute their releases in the UK. Brown saw the UK as the most important market to target and performed for five consecutive nights at the Georgian Club in Croydon to raise funds to start his new DEB Music label with Castro Brown. In early 1976, Castro secured a deal with Radio London disc jockey Charlie Gillett for Morpheus (and hence DEB) output to be issued through the latter's Oval Records, which had a distribution deal with Virgin Records, but after a dispute over Castro's separate supply of these records to London record shops, the deal was scrapped and the early DEB releases suffered from a lack of promotion. Later that year, Brown voiced two tracks at Lee "Scratch" Perry's Black Ark studio, "Take a Trip to Zion" and "Wolf and Leopard", the latter of which was a hit in Jamaica and would prove to be one of Brown's most popular songs, with a lyric criticizing those criminals who "rode the natty dread bandwagon". Brown confirmed in an interview in Black Echoes that he had parted company with Holness, stating: "I was going along with one man's ideas for too long. Niney was trying to find a new beat at all times, which was disconcerting, so I hadn't been working with my true abilities. Now I know that I can produce myself."

Brown recommenced working with Joe Gibbs, with an agreement that, in return for studio time for his own productions, Brown would allow Gibbs the use of any rhythm recorded in the process. The first album from this arrangement, the 1977 release Visions of Dennis Brown, gave him his biggest success up to that point, blending conscious themes and love songs, and confirming Brown's transformation from child star to grown-up artist. The biblical-themed sleeve and portrait of Haile Selassie on the jacket back complemented the roots reggae tracks on the album, including "Repatriation", "Jah Can Do it", and cover versions of Earl 16's "Malcolm X" and Clive Hunt's "Milk and Honey". The album immediately entered the Black Echoes chart and stayed there well into the following year, although it was only available in the UK as a premium-priced import. Visions... was voted reggae album of the year by Melody Maker writers and was given the same award by readers of Black Echoes. A reissued "Wolf and Leopard" single, and the eventual album release of the same name also sold well in the UK, both topping the Black Echoes chart.

Brown toured the UK in the fall of 1977 with Big Youth, and described the tour: "It's like I was appointed to deliver certain messages and now is the time to deliver them". He had also begun producing recordings by his protege, Junior Delgado. In 1978, Brown moved to live in London, and set up premises in Battersea Rise, near Clapham Junction to relaunch the DEB Music label with Castro Brown, with artists featured on the label including Junior Delgado, 15.16.17, Bob Andy, Lennox Brown, and later, Gregory Isaacs. Brown had further success himself with a discomix of "How Could I Leave You", a version of The Sharks' rocksteady standard "How Could I Live" with accompanying toast by Prince Mohamed. In March 1978, Brown flew to Jamaica, where he was booked at the last minute to perform at the One Love Peace Concert at the National Arena, backed by Lloyd Parks' We The People Band. Visions of Dennis Brown was given a wider distribution via a deal between Lightning Records and WEA and topped the UK reggae album chart in September 1978, this chart run lasting for five months. In August 1978, Brown returned to the UK, bringing Junior Delgado with him, and DEB Music released a series of singles, although they sold moderately compared to the label's earlier successes, but in the same month, Brown's breakthrough single was first released. Initially released as a discomix featuring a new version of "Money in my Pocket" and the deejay version "Cool Runnings" by Price Mohamed, which became unavailable for a time after quickly selling out its first pressing, this single gave Brown his first UK Top 40 hit, reaching number 14 the following year and becoming one of the biggest international hits in Jamaica's history, after crossing over first into soul clubs and then rock clubs. This success led to Brown featuring on the cover of the NME in February 1979.

Brown's next two albums were both released on DEB – So Long Rastafari and Joseph's Coat of Many Colours, although the label was closed down in 1979, after which Brown again did the rounds of Jamaica's top producers, as well as continuing self-productions with singles such as "The Little Village" and "Do I Worry?" in 1981.

=== A&M and the dancehall era ===
With continuing commercial success, Brown signed an international deal with A&M Records in 1981, and now based permanently in the UK, his first album release for the label was the Gibbs-produced Foul Play, which while not wholly a success included the roots tracks "The Existence of Jah" and "The World is Troubled". This was followed in 1982 by Love Has Found its Way, a Gibbs/Brown/Willie Lindo production that blended lovers rock with a more pop sound, and again was not a great success. His final album with the label, 1983's The Prophet Rides Again, again mixed roots themes with commercial R&B style tracks, and proved to be his swansong with the label. While his association with A&M had taken him in a more commercial pop direction, Kingston's music scene had shifted towards the new dancehall era, and Brown enthusiastically adapted to the new sound, recording for some of the genre's major producers including Prince Jammy and Gussie Clarke. In the early 1980s he also started a new label, Yvonne's Special, dedicated to his wife. In 1984, he collaborated with Gregory Isaacs on the album Two Bad Superstars Meet and the hit single "Let Off Supm", recorded with Sly & Robbie and Jammy, which was followed by a second album featuring the two stars, Judge Not, in 1985. Brown released a huge amount of work through the 1980s, including the 1986 Jammy-produced album The Exit, but his biggest success of the decade came in 1989 with the Gussie Clarke-produced duet with Isaacs "Big All Round", and the album Unchallenged. He continued to record prolifically in the 1990s, notably on the Three Against War album in 1995 with Beenie Man and Triston Palma, and on albums produced by Mikey Bennett, and his profile in the United States was raised by a series of album releases on RAS Records. In the late 1990s he was managed by Tommy Cowan, who contrasted Brown to Bob Marley, who he had also managed, stating "Bob Marley was a serious businessman, I don't think Dennis was as serious when it came to investment. Dennis was like a community person, he would earn money and in one hour he would give it away." Brown said of his approach to songwriting in the late 1990s:

"When I write a song I try to follow Joseph's way – deliverance through vision from all – true vibration. I want to be a shepherd in my work, teaching and learning, really singing so much. I don't want to sing and not live it. I must live it. If I can sing songs that people can watch me living, then they can take my work"

Brown's 1994 album Light My Fire was nominated for a Grammy Award, as was the last album recorded by Brown, Let Me Be the One (in 2001).

=== Death ===
In the late 1990s, Brown's health began to deteriorate. He had developed respiratory issues, probably exacerbated by longstanding problems with drug addiction, mainly cocaine, leading to him being taken ill in May 1999 after touring in Brazil with other reggae singers, where he was diagnosed with pneumonia. After returning to Kingston, Jamaica, on the evening of 30 June 1999, he was rushed to Kingston's University Hospital, suffering from cardiac arrest. Brown died the next day, the official cause of his death was a collapsed lung. Sitting Jamaican Prime Minister P. J. Patterson and former Prime Minister Edward Seaga of the Jamaica Labour Party, serving at the time as Opposition Leader, both spoke at Brown's funeral, which was held on 17 July 1999 in Kingston. The service, which lasted for three hours, also featured live performances by Maxi Priest, Shaggy, and three of Brown's sons. Brown was then buried at Kingston's National Heroes Park. Brown was survived by his wife Yvonne and ten children. Prime Minister Patterson paid tribute to Brown, saying: "Over the years, Dennis Brown has distinguished himself as one of the finest and most talented musicians of our time. The Crown Prince of Reggae as he was commonly called. He has left us with a vast repertoire of songs which will continue to satisfy the hearts and minds of us all for generations to come."

== Legacy ==
Dennis Brown was an inspiration and influence for many reggae singers from the late 1970s through to the 2000s, including Barrington Levy, Junior Reid, Frankie Paul, Luciano, Bushman, and Richie Stephens. In July 1999, a group of UK-based musicians and more than fifty vocalists working under the collective name The British Reggae All Stars (including Mafia & Fluxy, Carlton "Bubblers" Ogilvie, Peter Hunnigale, Louisa Mark, Nerious Joseph, and Sylvia Tella) recorded "Tribute Song", a medley of six of Brown's best-known songs, in memory of Brown.

He was honoured on the first anniversary of his death by a memorial concert in Brooklyn, which featured performances from Johnny Osbourne, Micky Jarrett, Delano Tucker, and Half Pint. In 2001, a charitable trust was set up in Brown's name. The Dennis Emanuel Brown Trust works to educate youngsters, maintain and advance the memory of Dennis Brown, and help to provide youngsters with musical instruments. The trust awards the Dennis Emanuel Brown (DEB) bursary for educational achievement each year to students between the ages of 10 and 12 years. In 2005, George Nooks, who had worked with Brown in the mid-1970s in his deejay guise as Prince Mohamed, released an album of Brown covers, George Nooks Sings Dennis Brown: The Voice Lives On, with Nooks stating: "I was always inspired by his talent and I used to sing like him. Dennis had a large influence on me. To me he was the greatest. He was my number one singer." In the same year, Gregory Isaacs paid a similar tribute with the album Gregory Isaacs Sings Dennis Brown. In February 2007, a series of events were staged in Jamaica in celebration of the lives of both Brown and Marley (both would have had birthdays that month). In 2008, the Dennis Brown Trust announced a new internet radio station, dedicated solely to the music of Dennis Brown, and in the same month a tribute concert was staged by the Jamaican Association of Vintage Artistes and Affiliates (JAVAA) featuring Dwight Pinkney, Derrick Harriott, Sugar Minott, George Nooks, and John Holt.

Songs about or dedicated to Brown include "If This World Were Mine" by Slightly Stoopid, "Drive" by Pepper (band), Whitney Houston's "Whitney Houston Dub Plate" on The Ecleftic: 2 Sides II a Book album by Wyclef Jean and "Song for Dennis Brown" by The Mountain Goats.

On 26 April 2010, Brown was featured on NPR Morning Edition news program as one of the "50 great voices – The stories of awe-inspiring voices from around the world and across time". The NPR "50 Great Voices" list includes Nat King Cole, Ella Fitzgerald, Mahalia Jackson and Jackie Wilson among others.

On 6 August 2011, being the 49th anniversary of the country's independence, the Governor-General of Jamaica posthumously conferred the Order of Distinction in the rank of Commander (CD) upon Brown, for his contribution to the Jamaican music industry.

In April 2012, a commemorative blue plaque was placed on Brown's home in Harlesden by the Nubian Jak Community Trust.

In 2023, Rolling Stone ranked Brown at number 67 on its list of the 200 Greatest Singers of All Time.

== Discography ==
=== Studio albums ===
- 1970 – No Man Is an Island (Studio One)
- 1971 – If I Follow My Heart (Studio One)
- 1972 – Super Reggae & Soul Hits (Crystal/Trojan)
- 1974 – The Best of Dennis Brown (Joe Gibbs) aka Best of Part 1 (1979, Joe Gibbs)
- 1975 – Deep Down (Observer), reissued in 1979 as So Long Rastafari (Harry J)
- 1975 – Just Dennis (Observer/Trojan)
- 1977 – Superstar (Micron)
- 1977 – Wolf & Leopards (DEB/Weed Beat)
- 1977 – Dennis Brown Meets Harry Hippy (Pioneer)(with Harry Hippy)
- 1978 – Westbound Train (Third World), aka Africa (Celluloid)
- 1978 – Visions of Dennis Brown (Joe Gibbs)
- 1979 – Joseph's Coat Of Many Colors (DEB)
- 1979 – Words of Wisdom (Joe Gibbs/Atlantic)
- 1980 – Spellbound (Joe Gibbs/Laser)
- 1981 – Money in My Pocket (Trojan)
- 1981 – Foul Play (Joe Gibbs/A&M)
- 1982 – Best Of Part 2 (Joe Gibbs)
- 1982 – Love Has Found Its Way (Joe Gibbs/A&M) (UK No. 72, US R&B #36)
- 1982 – More (Yvonne's Special)
- 1982 – Stage Coach Showcase (Yvonne's Special)
- 1982 – Yesterday, Today, & Tomorrow (Joe Gibbs)
- 1983 – Satisfaction Feeling (Yvonne's Special/Tad's)
- 1983 – The Prophet Rides Again (A&M)
- 1984 – Judge Not (with Gregory Isaacs) (Music Works/Greensleeves)
- 1984 – Two Bad Superstars (with Gregory Isaacs) (Burning Sounds)
- 1984 – Love's Got A Hold On Me (Joe Gibbs)
- 1984 – Revolution (Taxi/Yvonne's Special)
- 1984 – Reggae Super Stars Meet (with Horace Andy) (Striker Lee)
- 1985 – Slow Down (Jammy's/Greensleeves)
- 1985 – Wake Up (Natty Congo)
- 1985 – Wild Fire (with John Holt) (Natty Congo)
- 1986 – Brown Sugar (Taxi)
- 1986 – Baalgad (with Enos McLeod) (Goodies)
- 1986 – History (Live & Love)
- 1986 – Hold Tight (Live & learn)
- 1986 – The Exit (Jammy's)
- 1987 – So Amazing (with Janet Kay) (Trojan)
- 1987 – Visions (Shanachie)
- 1988 – Inseparable (WKS)
- 1989 – No Contest (with Gregory Isaacs) (Music Works/Greensleeves)
- 1989 – Death Before Dishonour (Tappa)
- 1989 – Good Vibrations (Yvonne's Special)
- 1990 – Over Proof (Two Friends/Greensleeves)
- 1990 – Unchallenged (Music Works/Greensleeves)
- 1990 – Reggae Giants (with Freddie McGregor) (Rocky One)
- 1990 – Sarge (Yvonne's Special)
- 1991 – Victory is Mine (Legga/RAS)
- 1992 – Another Day in Paradise (Trojan)
- 1992 – Beautiful Morning (World Record)
- 1992 – Blazing (Two Friends/Shanachie/Greensleeves)
- 1992 – Friends For Life (Black Scorpio/Shanachie)
- 1992 – Limited Edition (Artistic/VP/Greensleeves)
- 1992 – If I Didn't Love You
- 1992 – Cosmic (Observer)
- 1993 – Cosmic Force (Heartbeat)
- 1993 – The General (VP)
- 1993 – Legit (with Freddie McGregor & Cocoa Tea) (Greensleeves/Shanachie)
- 1993 – Rare Grooves Reggae Rhythm & Blues (Body Music/Yvonne's Special)
- 199? – Rare Grooves Reggae Rhythm & Blues vol. 2 (Yvonne's Special)
- 1993 – Songs of Emanuel (Yvonne's Special/Sonic Sounds)
- 1993 – Unforgettable (Jammy's)
- 1993 – Hotter Flames (with Frankie Paul) (VP)
- 1993 – Give Praises (Tappa)
- 1993 – It's The Right Time
- 1994 – 3 Against War (with Triston Palma & Beenie Man) (VP)
- 1994 – Blood Brothers (with Gregory Isaacs) (RAS)
- 1994 – Light My Fire (Heartbeat)
- 1994 – Nothing Like This (Greensleeves/RAS)
- 1994 – Party Time (with John Holt) (Sonic Sounds)
- 1994 – Vision of the Reggae King (Gold Mine/VP)
- 1995 – I Don't Know (Grapevine/Dynamite)
- 1995 – Temperature Rising (Trojan)
- 1995 – Dennis Brown and Friends (with Sugar Minott & Justin Hinds) (Jamaican Authentic Classics)
- 1995 – The Facts of Life (Diamond Rush)
- 1995 – You Got the Best of Me (Saxon)
- 1996 – Could It Be (VP)
- 1996 – Lovers Paradise (House of Reggae)
- 1996 – Milk & Honey (RAS)
- 1997 – Meet at the Penthouse (with Leroy Smart) (Rhino)
- 1998 – One of a Kind (Imaj)
- 1999 – Believe in Yourself (Don One/TP)
- 1999 – Bless Me Jah (RAS/Charm)
- 1999 – Generosity (Gator)

=== Posthumous releases and compilations ===
- 1983 – The Best of Dennis Brown (Blue Moon)
- 1987 – Greatest Hits (Rohit)
- 1987 – My Time (Rohit)
- 1990 – Go Now (Rohit)
- 1991 – Classic Gold (Rocky One)
- 1992 – Kollection (Gong Sounds)
- 1992 – Some Like It Hot (Heartbeat)
- 1992 – Classic Hits (Sonic Sounds)
- 1993 – Best Of – Musical Heatwave 1972–75 (Trojan)
- 1993 – 20 Magnificent Hits (Thunderbolt)
- 1993 – It's the Right Time (Rhino)
- 1994 – The Prime of Dennis Brown (Music Club)
- 1994 – Early Days (Sonic Sounds)
- 1995 – Africa – the Best of Dennis Brown vol. 1 (Esoldun)
- 1995 – Travelling Man – the Best of Dennis Brown vol. 2 (Esoldun)
- 1995 – Open The Gate – Greatest Hits Volume II (Heartbeat)
- 1995 – Joy in the Morning (Lagoon)
- 1996 – Hit After Hit (Rocky One)
- 1996 – The Very Best of Dennis Brown (Rhino)
- 1996 – Love & Hate: The Best of Dennis Brown (VP)
- 1996 – The Crown Prince (World Records)
- 1997 – Money in My Pocket (Delta Music)
- 1997 – Maximum Replay (Gone Clear)
- 1997 – Ras Portraits (RAS)
- 1997 – Reggae Max (Jet Star)
- 1998 – The Prime of Dennis Brown (Music Club)
- 1998 – Watch This Sound (Jamaican Gold)
- 1998 – Lovers Paradise (Time Music)
- 1998 – Tracks of Life (Snapper)
- 1999 – The Godlike Genius of Dennis Brown (Dressed to Kill)
- 1999 – Reggae Legends vol. 2 (Artists Only)
- 1999 – In the Mood (Charly)
- 1999 – Greatest Hits (Charly)
- 1999 – Love is So True (Prism)
- 1999 – Stone Cold World (VP)
- 1999 – Ready We Ready (Super Power)
- 1999 – Tribulation (PDG/Heartbeat)
- 1999 – The Great Mr Brown
- 2000 – May Your Food Basket Never Empty (RAS)
- 2000 – Reggae Trilogy (with Glen Washington & Gregory Isaacs) (J&D)
- 2000 – We are all One (J&D)
- 2000 – The Crown Prince (Metro)
- 2000 – Let Me be the One (VP)
- 2001 – Cassandra (Starburst)
- 2001 – Love's Got a Hold on You (Artists Only)
- 2001 – Money in My Pocket: Anthology (Trojan)
- 2001 – Any Day Now (Heartbeat)
- 2001 – Essential (Next Music)
- 2001 – Archives (Trojan)
- 2001 – The Prime of Dennis Brown (Music Club)
- 2002 – Dennis Brown In Dub (with Niney the Observer) (Rounder/Heartbeat)
- 2002 – You Satisfy My Soul (Fat Man)
- 2002 – Memorial: Featuring John Holt (Jetstar)
- 2002 – The Promised Land 1977–79 (Blood & Fire)
- 2002 – Winning Combinations (with Bunny Wailer) (Universal)
- 2002 – Memorial (Jetstar)
- 2002 – Forever Dennis (Jetstar/Reggae Road)
- 2003 – The Complete A&M Years (A&M)
- 2003 – Dennis Brown Sings Gregory Isaacs (RAS)
- 2003 – Crown Prince (Trojan)
- 2004 – Dennis Brown Conqueror: An Essential Collection (Burning Bush)
- 2005 – Money in My Pocket: The Definitive Collection (Trojan)
- 2005 – Sings Revival Classics (Cousins)
- 2005 – At the Foot of the Mountain (Charm)
- 2006 – Sledgehammer Special (with King Tubby)
- 2006 – Taxi 3 Trio (with Gregory Isaacs & Sugar Minott) (Taxi)
- 2008 – A Little Bit More: Joe Gibbs 12" Selection 1978–1983 (VP)
- 2010 – The Crown Prince Of Reggae: Singles (1972–1985) Reggae Anthology (#10 US Reggae)
- 2020 – Dennis (Burning Sounds) . Vinyl - Originally released in 1983

=== Live albums ===
- 1979 – Live in Montreux (Laser/Joe Gibbs)
- 1987 – In Concert (Ayeola)
- 1992 – Live in Montego Bay (Sonic Sounds)
- 2000 – Academy (Orange Street)
- 2001 – Best of Reggae Live (Innerbeat)
- 2001 – Best of Reggae Live vol. 2 (Innerbeat)
- 2003 – Live in New York (Ital International)

=== DVD and Video ===
- The Living Legend (VHS; Keeling Videos)
- Rock Steady Roll Call (VHS; Ruff Neck)
- Stars in the East (with John Holt) (VHS/DVD; Ruff Neck)
- Inseparable volumes 1–4 (4 VHS volumes (199?)/2 DVD volumes (2004); Ruff Neck)
- Live at Montreux (1996; DVD; Synergie)
- Hits After Hits (2001; DVD; Keeling Videos)
- Live at Reggae Ganfest (2003; DVD; Contreband)

=== Productions of other artists ===
- 1977 – Various Artists – Black Echoes
- 1978 – The DEB Music Players – Umoja
- 1978 – The DEB Music Players – 20th Century DEB-Wise
- 1979 – The DEB Music Players – DJ Tracking
- 1979 – Junior Delgado – Effort
- 1979 – Junior Delgado – Taste of the Young Heart
- 1981 – Junior Delgado – More She Love It
- 1982 – Junior Delgado – Bush Master Revolution
- 1985 – Various Artists – 4 Star Showcase
- 1996 – Various Artists – Return to Umoja

=== International hit singles ===
- "Money In My Pocket" (1979) – UK No. 14
- "Love Has Found Its Way" (1982) – UK No. 47, US R&B No. 42
- "Senorita" (1988) – UK No. 95
