= Cycle for Declamation =

Song cycle by Priaulx Rainier

Cycle for Declamation is a song cycle for tenor solo composed in 1954 by Priaulx Rainier (1903–86). (Note: Allmusic gives 1953 as the year of composition, Peter Pears 1954. The latter – being the work's commissioner and original performer – seems the more reliable source.)

== Description ==
The work was commissioned by the tenor Peter Pears. It consists of settings of texts by John Donne (1572–1631), adapted from three of the Meditations in his Devotions upon Emergent Occasions. A typical performance takes 9 minutes. The titles of the songs are:

1. "Wee Cannot Bid the Fruits" (from Meditation XIX)
2. "In the Wombe of the Earth" (from Meditation XVIII)
3. "Nunc, lento, sonitu dicunt, morieris" (from Meditation XVII) (Note: Latin. Now this bell, tolling softly for another, says to me, Thou must die.)

Peter Pears has said: "Whereas the medievals [sic] for the most part dispensed with any harmonic implications, here the composer has suggested a strong harmonic skeleton behind the solo voice, to fine effect: in the last section the use of different registers of the voice vividly underlines Donne's wonderful text.

== The song texts ==
The texts use 17th century spelling. Modernised, they read:

=== 1. "Wee Cannot Bid the Fruits" ===
We cannot bid the fruits come in May, nor the leaves to stick on in December. There are of them that will give, that will do justice, that will pardon, but they have their own seasons for all these, and he that knows not them, shall starve before that gift come. Reward is the season of one man, and importunity of another; fear is the season of one man, and favour of another; friendship the season of one man, and natural affection of another; and he that knows not their seasons, nor cannot stay them, must lose the fruits.

=== 2. "In the Wombe of the Earth" ===
In the womb of the earth, we diminish, and when she is delivered of us, our grave opened for another, we are not transplanted, but transported, our dust blown away with profane dust, with every wind.

=== 3. "Nunc, lento, sonitu dicunt, morieris" ===
Nunc, lento, sonitu dicunt, morieris. The bell doth toll for him that thinks it doth. Morieris. (Note: Latin. Thou must die.) Who casts not up his eye to the sun when it rises? but who takes off his eye from a comet when that breaks out? Who bends not his ear to any bell, which upon any occasion rings? Morieris. But who can remove it from that bell which is passing a piece of himself out of the world? Nunc, lento, sonitu dicunt, morieris. No man is an island, entire of itself; no man is an island, entire of itself; every man is a piece of the continent, a part of the main. If a clod be washed away by the sea, Europe is the less, as well as if a promontory were, as well as if a manor of thy friends or of thine own were. Morieris. Any man's death diminishes me, because I am involved in mankind. Morieris. And therefore never send to know for whom the bell tolls; it tolls for thee. Nunc, lento, sonitu dicunt, morieris.
