= Darwin Symphony Orchestra =

Australian Orchestra

Darwin Symphony Orchestra (DSO)
- Orchestra
- Founded: 1989
- Website: www.dso.org.au

The Darwin Symphony Orchestra (DSO) is an orchestra based in Darwin, Northern Territory, Australia, founded by Martin Jarvis.

The DSO gave its first concert in 1989. The Orchestra receives funding from the Northern Territory Government and support from private corporations and donors including Charles Darwin University. The orchestra has over 90 musicians, and performs about eight concerts a year across the Northern Territory. ABC Television produced a documentary on the DSO titled Have Orchestra, Will Travel which received both national and overseas broadcasts.

The Orchestra has performed concerts in places such as Katherine, Tennant Creek, Alice Springs, Glen Helen Gorge, Groote Eylandt, Nhulunbuy and Jabiru. The ensemble has also performed with renowned artists, including John Williams and Emma Matthews.

The DSO was twice presented with the National Australia Day Community Event of the Year Award. In 1995 the DSO received the award for Outstanding Contribution to Australian Culture from the Centre of Australian Cultural Research. In 2000 the Orchestra was presented by TOAN (The Orchestras of Australia Network) with the award for a community orchestra

The artistic director and chief conductor of the DSO in 2026-27 is Richard Mills AO, and the orchestra's acting general manager is Louise Potzeldt (current as at June 2025).
