= Rachel Cavalho =

Rachel Cavalho (1907 – 28 July 2002) was an Australian-born pianist and music educator.

She was born in Queensland and studied in England with Louis Kentner and Priaulx Rainier. Cavalho went on to perform in England and Canada. In 1948, she moved to Toronto, where she taught at the Hambourg Conservatory of Music. During the 1950s, Cavalho was the host of the CBC Radio programs "Music for Young Musicians" and "Music for Young Pianists". In 1968, she published Scale Patterns for Young Pianists. She helped found the Toronto contemporary music festival Contemporary Showcase in 1970.
