= Devotions upon Emergent Occasions =

Prose work by John Donne published in 1624

- by John Donne
- Title page, Cambridge University Press, 1923
- Country: Kingdom of England
- Language: English
- Publication date: 1624

Reading of "Meditation XVII" written by John Donne

Devotions Upon Emergent Occasions, and severall steps in my Sicknes is a prose work by the English metaphysical poet and clergyman John Donne, published in 1624. It covers death, rebirth and the early modern concept of sickness as a visit from God, reflecting internal sinfulness. The Devotions were written in December 1623 as Donne recovered from a serious but unknown illness – believed to be relapsing fever or typhus. Having come close to death, he described the illness he had suffered from and his thoughts throughout his recovery with "near super-human speed and concentration". Registered by 9 January, and published soon after, the Devotions is one of only seven works attributed to Donne which were printed during his lifetime.

The Devotions is divided into 23 parts, each consisting of three sub-sections, called the meditation, the expostulation and a prayer. The 23 sections are chronologically ordered, each covering his thoughts and reflections on a single day of the illness. The 17th devotion includes the phrases "No man is an Iland" (often modernised as "No man is an island") and "…for whom the bell tolls, it tolls for thee." The work as a whole is considered similar to 17th-century devotional writing generally, and particularly to Donne's Holy Sonnets. Some academics have also identified political strands running through the work, possibly from a polemic Arminian denunciation of Puritanism to advise the young Prince Charles.

== Background ==
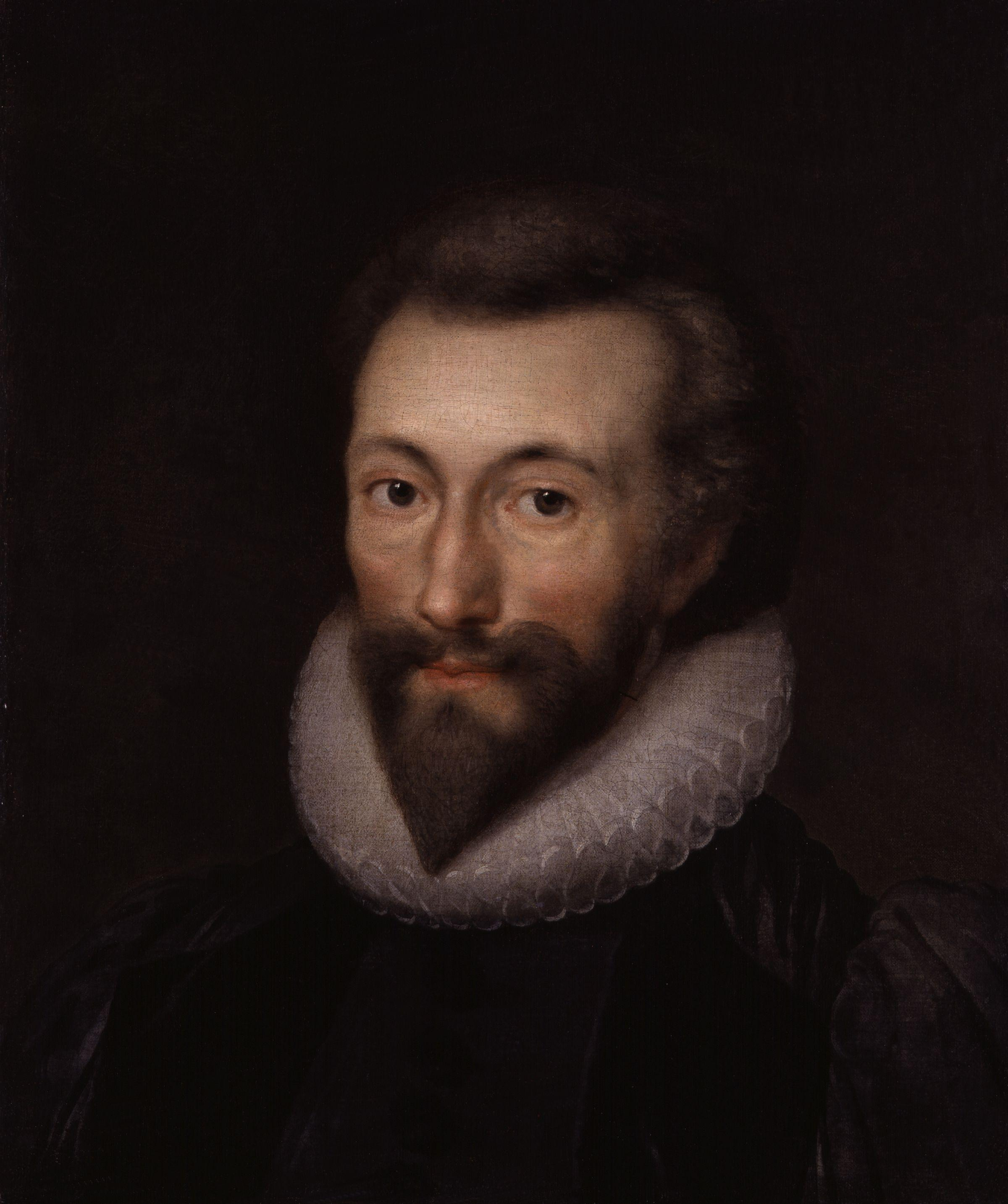
John Donne, aged about 42

Donne was born in 1572 to a wealthy ironmonger and a warden of the Worshipful Company of Ironmongers, and his wife Elizabeth. After his father's death when he was four, Donne was trained as a gentleman scholar; his family used the money his father had made to hire tutors who taught him grammar, rhetoric, mathematics, history and foreign languages. Elizabeth remarried to a wealthy physician, ensuring the family remained comfortable; as a result, despite being the son of an ironmonger and portraying himself in his early poetry as an outsider, Donne refused to accept that he was anything other than a gentleman. After study at Hart Hall, Oxford, Donne's private education saw him study at Lincoln's Inn, one of the Inns of Court, where he occupied his time with history, poetry, theology and "Humane learning and languages". It was at Lincoln's Inn that Donne first began writing poetry, looking upon it as "a life-sign or minor irritation" rather than something that defined him.

In November 1623, Donne fell seriously ill. London was the scene of a 'spotted' or relapsing fever, which hit its victims unexpectedly and left them conscious but physically helpless. What disease Donne suffered from is not known. Writers have suggested typhus as a likely culprit, but Donne's writings on the subject reference multiple diseases. Clara Lander, writing in SEL: Studies in English Literature 1500–1900, suggests that the typhus may have exacerbated the enteritis Donne had suffered from since childhood. Donne was of the opinion – as were many others of the age – that illness reflected a state of internal sinfulness, and constituted a visit from God. Despite being ordered to rest, he insisted that a pen and paper be given to him, and he wrote down his impressions of the disease. After his recovery, in December, these became Devotions upon Emergent Occasions, one of his few published prose works, and also one of only seven printed works of which he acknowledged authorship. Written with "near super-human speed and concentration", the work was registered with the Stationers' Company by 9 January 1624. It was published that year, and again in 1634 and 1638. The full, albeit rarely used, title is Devotions Upon Emergent Occasions, and severall steps in my Sicknes.

== Contents ==
Structurally, Devotions consists of 23 chronologically ordered sections – representing the length, in days, of Donne's illness. Each one contains a 'meditation', in which he describes a stage of his illness, an 'expostulation' containing his reaction to that stage, and finally a prayer in which he makes peace with the disease. In the five editions published during the 17th century, the book opens with a Latin preface, titled "Stationes, sive Periodi in Morbo, ad quas referuntur Meditationes sequentes". Also 23 sections long, each line of the preface is followed by what purports to be an English translation of the Latin. Joan Webber argues that these lines constitute a poem, in dactylic hexameter; David Novarr disputes this, arguing that Stationes "has none of Donne's customary wit, drama, and imagination". Instead, it represents the Stations of the Cross, or supplicatio stativa. Mary Arshagouni, writing in Modern Philology, argues that the stationes indeed constitute a poem – or, at least, something more than a mere table of contents. The Latin lines play off the English translations, and contain nuanced meaning not found in the English that better represents the sections to which they refer.

Following the stationes, the 23 meditations begin. Each section, taken in an isolated way, follows the same pattern: Donne states some element of his illness or treatment, and then expands upon his statement to develop a theme that culminates with him becoming closer to God. Perhaps the most famous of the meditations is Meditation XVII, which begins with the statement:

Nunc lento sonitu dicunt, Morieris (Now this Bell, tolling softly for another, saies to me, Thou must die).

This statement, or title, is then expanded on. Donne first concludes that he may not be aware that the bell is tolling, saying "hee for whom this Bell tolls may be so ill, as that he knowes not it tolls for him; And perchance I may thinke my selfe so much better than I am, as that they who are about mee, and see my state, may have caused it to toll for mee, and I know not that". This is then expanded with the realisation that, even if the bell is tolling for others, it is a matter of concern for Donne, as:

No man is an Iland, intire of it selfe; every man is a peece of the Continent, a part of the maine; if a Clod bee washed away by the Sea, Europe is the lesse, as well as if a Promontorie were, as well as if a Mannor of thy friends or of thine owne were; any mans death diminishes me, because I am involved in Mankinde; And therefore never send to know for whom the bell tolls; It tolls for thee. [Donne's original spelling and punctuation]

Donne then argues that if someone dies, anyone has the right to use their death as long as they do so valuably, considering it a treasure. He writes that:

If a man carry treasure in bullion, or in a wedge of gold, and have none coined into currant Monies, his treasure will not defray him as he travells. Tribulation is Treasure in the nature of it, but it is not currant money in the use of it, except wee get nearer and nearer our home, Heaven, by it. Another man may be sicke too, and sick to death, and this affliction may lie in his bowels, as gold in a Mine, and be of no use to him; but this bell, that tells me of his affliction, digs out, and applies that gold to mee if by this consideration of anothers danger, I take mine owne into contemplation, and so secure my selfe, by making my recourse to my God, who is our onely securitie.

The death of an individual – signified by the tolling of the bell – is thus a treasure buried at the bottom of a mine: only of value if it is given to someone who makes good use of it. In this he refers to the work of Augustine of Hippo, specifically On Christian Doctrine, in which Augustine describes the knowledge of pagans as gold and silver: something that can be involved in Christian purposes if appropriated properly. Donne, twisting this idea, is arguing that the death of any individual is something others can learn from, should they understand it properly.

== Style and meaning ==
Stylistically, the Devotions is an example of 17th-century devotional writing, and has been compared by Roger Rollin, professor of literature at Clemson University, to the Holy Sonnets and considered, in effect, a sequel. In the context of 17th-century devotional writing, Rollin uses the Devotions to demonstrate that, in his view, such writings were "more public than private, [serving as] vehicles for the diagnosis of spiritual malaise and as sources of remedies". Lander argued that the full title signifies "growth of the spirit through physical ordeal", and in doing so draws on the devotional works of Joseph Hall. Thomas F. Van Laan, writing in Studies in Philology, draws parallels between Donne's style and the Ignatian exercises: a set of structured mental exercises designed to bring an individual closer to understanding God.

A number of literary theorists have approached the Devotions as politically themed. Richard Strier, in particular, identifies the Devotions as an "Arminian polemic", (Note: Arminianism is a branch of Protestantism founded by Jacobus Arminius, and centred around the Five Articles of Remonstrance; amongst other things, it challenged the traditional belief that all actions were predestined and free will was not present.) arguing that it was highly atypical of Donne to actually publish works, rather than merely let them circulate amongst friends. Both before and after ordination, Donne actively resisted publication, normally only publishing works that had been the result of a commission, such as The Anniversaries or Pseudo-Martyr. The Devotions, however, were "literally rushed" into print, with the volume being handed to the printers a month after he had recovered from his disease. Strier argues that Donne's rationale for publishing the Devotions matches his rationale for publishing a sermon, the Encaenia, the same year, to assert the importance of "places, and of dayes, and of all outward meanes", because he felt some sense of urgency about what he had to say. This is coupled with Devotion XVI, in which Donne explicitly comes out against Puritanism (Note: While a precise definition of Puritanism is still not settled, Puritans were characterised by a rejection of the practices of the established church, and an insistence on treating the Bible as the sole (and pure) source of God's will.) and is simultaneously "purposely militant", deliberately frustrating the other extreme from Puritanism, where "the Arminianism and the polemical anti-puritanism of the volume becomes explicit".

Dave Gray and Jeanne Shami, writing in the Modern Language Quarterly, argue that it was not just a work of political rhetoric but a work of political advice, aimed at Prince Charles, (Note: Later King Charles I of England.) to whom it was dedicated. The political situation at the time was complex, as King James was ill and Charles attempting to gain control of the government. Gray and Shami highlight the noted line "No man is an island"; while most interpret it spiritually, they argue that it was a reminder to the prince and his advisors that "even private actions have public consequences". The veiled nature of the political references was deliberate; it allowed the work to be acceptable to the censors, but accessible to Charles and those close to him. In the event that they rejected the underlying message, it would also be accessible to other prominent and influential political figures.

Lander argues that the structure of the work is itself symbolic. As well as the division of the poem into 23 parts, each signifying and describing one day of Donne's illness, each part is itself split in three – representing the Trinity. The use of three elements – Meditation, Expostulation, and Prayer – also matches the three services found in the Book of Common Prayer, a common influence on devotional writers of Donne's era.Donne in the poem emphasise the idea of human world as a whole in which each human being is related to others. so Donne says that every man is a continent connected to the main, if the continent dies, it will certainly affect the main land, in the same way if a man dies his death is felt by the people related to the man. That shows that when the death bell tolls, it not only tolls for the man but for the mankind who are related to him.

== Critical response ==
The Devotions have received a mixed reaction from critics. Evelyn Simpson described it as "a curious little book", and wrote that "[a]s a manual of devotion [the Devotions] compares unfavourably with the Devotions of Bishop Andrewes or the Holy Living of Jeremy Taylor. It is too introspective, too metaphysical, too much overloaded with learning of different kinds". Helen C. White described it as the output of an "anxious and restless mind".

Arshagouni, on the other hand, describes the Devotions as

Donne's most mature, perhaps most complex work: a remarkable, sustained prose-poem that not only expresses conflicting and powerful internal emotions but also consciously provides its readers with a touching model of the experiences of God's elect in confronting the inexorable course of human sinfulness that characterizes life on earth.

Helen Wilcox writes that "the mixture of elaborate rhetoric, painstaking argument, and the frank details of his melancholic 'ridling distemper' creates a particularly powerful impact" and draws particular attention to Meditation XVII, noting that despite the apparent self-interest of the Devotions, that piece highlights Donne's recognition of the ultimate interconnectedness of humanity. Meditation XVII was also the focus of Robert Jungman, who, writing in American Notes and Queries, noted it as the most forceful statement of Donne's theme in what was ultimately a "powerful psychological analysis".

In wider popular culture, several phrases from the Devotions, particularly Meditation XVII, have become commonly quoted, including "No man is an Iland" (often modernised as "No man is an island") and "…for whom the bell tolls". Thomas Festa, writing in Notes and Queries, identifies similarities between Thomas Browne's Christian Morals and Donne's Meditation XIV.

Priaulx Rainier's 1954 song cycle Cycle for Declamation consists of musical settings for solo tenor of short extracts from three of the Devotions.

== Bibliography ==
- Arshagouni, Mary (1991). "The Latin "Stationes" in John Donne's "Devotions upon Emergent Occasions"". Modern Philology. 89 (2). University of Chicago Press: 196–210. doi:10.1086/391950. ISSN 0026-8232. S2CID 161272616.
- Carey, John (2008). John Donne: Life, Mind and Art. Faber and Faber. ISBN 978-0-571-24446-1.
- Cox III, Gerard H. (1973). "Donne's Devotions: A Meditative Sequence on Repentance". Harvard Theological Review. 66 (3). Cambridge University Press: 331–351. doi:10.1017/S0017816000001917. ISSN 0017-8160. S2CID 162461027.
- Donne, John (1923). Donne's Devotions. Cambridge University Press.
- Festa, Thomas (2011). "A Source of Sir Thomas Browne's Christian Morals III. 29 in John Donne's Devotions Upon Emergent Occasions". Notes and Queries. 58 (9). Oxford University Press: 378–379. doi:10.1093/notesj/gjr111. ISSN 0029-3970.
- Franchot, Jenny (1994). Roads to Rome: The Antebellum Protestant encounter with Catholicism. University of California Press. ISBN 9780520078185.
- Guibbory, Achsah (2006). "Chronology". In Achsah Guibbory (ed.). The Cambridge Companion to John Donne. Cambridge University Press. ISBN 978-0-521-54003-2.
- Goldberg, Jonathan (1971). "The Understanding of Sickness in Donne's Devotions". Renaissance Quarterly. 24 (4). University of Chicago Press: 507–517. doi:10.2307/2859378. ISSN 0034-4338. JSTOR 2859378. PMID 11615495. S2CID 26665639.
- Gray, Dave; Shami, Jeanne (1989). "Political Advice in Donne's Devotions". Modern Language Quarterly. 50 (4). Duke University Press. doi:10.1215/00267929-50-4-337. ISSN 0026-7929.
- Haskin, Dayton (2006). "Donne's afterlife". In Achsah Guibbory (ed.). The Cambridge Companion to John Donne. Cambridge University Press. doi:10.1017/CCOL0521832373.015. ISBN 978-0-521-54003-2.
- Jungman, Robert (2007). "Mining for Augustinian Gold in John Donne's "Meditation 17."". American Notes and Queries. 20 (2). Oxford University Press. doi:10.3200/ANQQ.20.2.16-20. ISSN 0003-0171.
- Laan, Thomas F. Van (1963). "John Donne's "Devotions" and the Jesuit Spiritual Exercises". Studies in Philology. 60 (2). University of North Carolina Press. ISSN 0039-3738.
- Lander, Clara (1971). "A Dangerous Sickness Which Turned to a Spotted Fever". SEL: Studies in English Literature 1500–1900. 11 (1). Rice University. doi:10.2307/449820. ISSN 1522-9270.
- Lapham, Lewis (1997). The End of the World. Thomas Dunne Books.
- Morgan, John (1988). Godly Learning: Puritan Attitudes Towards Reason, Learning and Education, 1560–1640. Cambridge University Press. ISBN 9780521357005.
- Novarr, David (1980). The disinterred muse: Donne's texts and contexts. Cornell University Press. ISBN 9780801413094.
- Pebworth, Ted-Larry (2006). "The text of Donne's writings". In Achsah Guibbory (ed.). The Cambridge Companion to John Donne. Cambridge University Press. ISBN 978-0-521-54003-2.
- Post, Jonathan F.S. (2006). "Donne's life: a sketch". In Achsah Guibbory (ed.). The Cambridge Companion to John Donne. Cambridge University Press. ISBN 978-0-521-54003-2.
- Simpson, Evelyn (1924). A Study of the Prose Works of John Donne. Clarendon Press.
- Souter, Andrew. "Another Possible Source For T.S Eliot's 'Handful of Dust'". Notes and Queries. 56 (3). Oxford University Press. ISSN 0029-3970.
- Steele, David; Thomas, Curtis C. (1963). The Five Points of Calvinism; Defined, Defended, Documented. Philadelphia: Presbyterian and Reformed Publishing. ISBN 0875524443. LCCN 63021695.
- Strier, Richard (1996). "Donne and the politics of devotion". In Donna B. Hamilton (ed.). Religion, Literature, and Politics in Post-Reformation England, 1540–1688. Cambridge University Press. ISBN 9780521474566.
- Stringer, Gary A. (2005). The Variorum Edition of the Poetry of John Donne, Volume 7, Part 1: The Holy Sonnets. Indiana University Press. ISBN 9780253111814.
- Stubbs, John (2007). Donne: The Reformed Soul. Penguin Books. ISBN 978-0-14-101717-4.
- Webber, Joan (1968). The eloquent "I": style and self in seventeenth-century prose. University of Wisconsin Press. ISBN 9780299512408.
- White, Helen C. (1931). English Devotional Literature 1600–1640. University of Wisconsin. Studies in language and literature. Madison.
- Wilcox, Helen (2006). "Devotional writing". In Achsah Guibbory (ed.). The Cambridge Companion to John Donne. Cambridge University Press. ISBN 978-0-521-54003-2.
