= Cynthia Richards =

Jamaican singer (born 1944)

- Born: Sinthia Richards; 1944 (age 80–81); Duhaney Park, Jamaica
- Genres: Reggae
- Occupation: Singer-songwriter
- Instruments: Vocals, guitar
- Years active: 1960s – 1970s
- Labels: Studio One, Trojan, Clandisc

Cynthia Richards (born Sinthia Richards, 1944) is a Jamaican singer whose career began in the 1960s.

== Biography ==
Born in Duhaney Park, Kingston, Jamaica, in 1944, Richards attended the Denham Town Primary School where after impressing teachers with a performance at an end-of-term concert she was encouraged to appear on the Vere Johns Talent Show. While working as a magistrate's clerk, she continued her career, working in the 1960s with Bobby Aitken's Carib Beats band and later the Falcons (with a young Dennis Brown), Byron Lee & the Dragonaires, and the Mighty Vikings. She recorded her debut single, "How Could I", in 1969, produced by Clement "Coxsone" Dodd for his Studio One label. Although this wasn't a success, it brought her to the attention of Clancy Eccles, who produced "Foolish Fool", which became a major hit in Jamaica. She also recorded as one half of the duo Cynthia & Archie. She moved on to work with several producers, including Duke Reid, for whom she recorded "Jungle Fever", "Sentimental Reason", and "Aily I", the latter a hit with UK reggae audiences in 1972. Other producers she worked with included Alvin Ranglin and Larry Lawrence, before moving into self-production with singles such as "Mr. Postman", and had further chart success in Jamaica with her version of The Staple Singers' "If You're Ready (Come Go With Me)". She was voted Top Female Artist of 1973 in Jamaica and toured with Elmo and Toots and the Maytals. Later in the 1970s she worked as a backing singer, contributing to Beres Hammond's 1976 album Soul Reggae and Pat Kelly's 1978 album Lonely Man.

== Discography ==
- Foolish Fool (1969), Clan Disc (Trojan)
- Conversation (1970), Clan Disc (Trojan)
- Promises (1970), Clan Disc (Trojan)
- Can't Wait (1970), Clan Disc (Trojan)
- I Was Just Thinking About You (1970), Clan Disc (Trojan)
- United We Stand (1970), Pressure Drop (Trojan)
- Stand By Your Man (1971), Clan Disc (Trojan)
- Is There A Place in Your Heart For Me (1971), GG Records (Trojan)
- Moving On (1971), Big Shot
- Aily I (1973), Attack (Trojan)
- Sentimental Reason (1973), Lord Koos
- If You're Ready Come Go With Me (1974)
- Think About Me (1974), Cactus
- Keep It in the Family (1974), Cactus
- I Shall Not Remove (1977), Grove Music

=== As Clancy and Cynthia ===
- Tomorrow (1971), Clan Disc (Trojan)
