= Priaulx Rainier =

South African-British composer (1903–1986)

Priaulx Rainier photographed in 1984 by George Newson

Ivy Priaulx Rainier (3 February 1903 – 10 October 1986) was a South African–British composer. Although she lived most of her life in England and died in France, her compositional style was strongly influenced by the African music remembered from her childhood. She never adopted 12-tone or serial techniques, but her music shows a profound understanding of that musical language. She can be credited with the first truly athematic works composed in England. Her Cello Concerto was premiered by Jacqueline du Pré in 1964, and her Violin Concerto Due Canti e Finale was premiered by Yehudi Menuhin in 1977.

== Biography ==
Priaulx Rainier was born in 1903 in Howick, Colony of Natal, to a father of Huguenot descent and an English mother. One of her sisters was a cellist. She studied the violin at the South African College of Music in Cape Town after her family moved there when she was aged 10, but moved permanently to London at the age of 17, in 1920, when she took up a scholarship to the Royal Academy of Music (RAM). She studied there with Rowsby Woof and Sir John Blackwood McEwen. She taught at Badminton School, Bristol, and also played violin in a string quartet. She had encouragement as a composer from Arnold Bax, and in 1937 studied with Nadia Boulanger in Paris, but considered herself essentially self-taught.

=== Early career ===
Priaulx Rainer started composing in 1924, but little came from her pen until 1937, after a long period of recuperation following a serious car accident in 1935. Her first acknowledged work was Three Greek Epigrams for voice and piano. Her first mature work was the String Quartet No. 1 in C minor (1939). It was given a private performance in 1940 but not performed publicly until 1944, at Wigmore Hall. It was recorded in 1949 by the Amadeus Quartet, and there is a modern recording by the Signum Quartett. The music was used for a ballet titled Night Spell, performed by the José Limón company in the United States in 1951 and at Sadler's Wells Ballet in 1957.

She often used ostinato-like repetition and alternation in her works, often of a percussive character. These characteristics are apparent in the Viola Sonata (premiered in March 1946 by Winifred Copperwheat and Antony Hopkins) and the Barbaric Dance Suite for piano (1949; premiered in November 1950 by Margaret Kitchin). There is also a Suite for clarinet and piano (1943), a Sinfonia da camera for strings (1947; commissioned by a close friend, Michael Tippett; premiered by Walter Goehr,) and a Ballet Suite (1950). Her first large-scale work for voices was Orpheus Sonnets for soprano, baritone, chorus and orchestra.

In 1939 she was appointed a Professor of Composition at the RAM, where she remained until 1961. She was elected a Fellow in 1952. Her students included Nigel Butterley, Jeremy Dale Roberts, Rachel Cavalho, and Christopher Small. She and Michael Tippett co-founded the St Ives September Festival, first presented in June 1953.

=== Music ===
The first of Priaulx Rainier's large orchestral works was Phalaphala (the word refers to an African chief's ceremonial horn), first heard in 1961, celebrating Sir Adrian Boult's tenth anniversary with the London Philharmonic Orchestra (1960).

Peter Pears and the Purcell Singers gave the first performance of Priaulx Rainier's Requiem (1956; tenor and unaccompanied chorus) at the Aldeburgh Festival that year. It was set to the poem Requiem, written for her by David Gascoyne in 1938–1940 in Paris and dedicated to future victims of war. Pears also commissioned Rainier's Cycle for Declamation (1954) and The Bee Oracles (1970), a setting of Edith Sitwell's poem The Bee-Keeper scored for tenor, flute, oboe, violin, cello and harpsichord. Pears first sang it publicly at the Aldeburgh Festival (Note: Another source states it was premiered at the Wigmore Hall on 21 March 1971.) in 1970.

The oboe quartet Quanta was commissioned by William Glock, Head of Music at the BBC, and written for Janet Craxton and the London Oboe Quartet. The title comes from the quantum theory.

The Cello Concerto was written for a Prom Concert held on 3 September 1964 where it was introduced to the world by Jacqueline du Pré and the BBC Symphony Orchestra under Norman Del Mar (at the same concert, du Pré played Edward Elgar's Cello Concerto with the same orchestra under Sir Malcolm Sargent, the year before she made her famous recording of it under Sir John Barbirolli.) It has been claimed that du Pré "loathed every second" of the Rainier concerto, "not only because of its idiom, but also because it was technically beyond her".

Priaulx Rainier's largest work of that period was the orchestral suite Aequora Lunae, a continuous piece in seven sections, each one descriptive of one of the Moon's seas. It was dedicated to Barbara Hepworth, whose acquaintance she made in the summer of 1949 when she stayed in St Ives, Cornwall, using a fisherman's loft as a studio. She remained a close friend of Hepworth and Ben Nicholson. She claimed that only sculptors and architects fully understood her music. Another work premiered at a Prom Concert was Ploërmel (1973), an evocation of one her favourite places, Ploërmel in the North West of France, near the mouth of the River Loire. It uses an orchestra of winds and percussion, including timpani, tubular bells, hand-bells, antique cymbals, high and low gongs, xylophone, and marimba.

Her violin concerto, Due Canti e Finale, was commissioned by Yehudi Menuhin, who performed it at the 1977 Edinburgh Festival with the Royal Philharmonic Orchestra conducted by Sir Charles Groves. Menuhin described Rainier as "having a musical imagination of a colour and variety scarcely to be believed". On the other hand, after hearing her music, William Walton commented that she "must have barbed-wire underwear". Concertante for Two Winds and Orchestra was written for, and dedicated to, Janet Craxton and Thea King and was premiered at the Proms in 1981.

There have been infrequent performances of Priaulx Rainier's music as they are difficult for both performer and listener. Premieres of her music were not always adequate, reducing the chances of there being further performances. Her complete chamber music was recorded and broadcast by the BBC in 1976.

=== Later life ===
She was awarded a Doctorate in Music (Honoris Causa) by the University of Cape Town in June 1982. She was a passionate gardener and ecologist who helped design, and planted the exotic plants in, Barbara Hepworth's Sculpture Garden in St Ives. Her last work, Wildlife Celebration, was commissioned by Yehudi Menuhin and performed in aid of Gerald Durrell's Wildlife Conservation Trust.

Priaulx Rainier died on 10 October 1986 at Besse-en-Chandesse in France, aged 83. The date was the 70th birthday of David Gascoyne, the poet to whose words she had written her Requiem of 1956.

== Legacy ==
A large collection of Rainier's letters and personal papers are held at the Royal Academy of Music Library, while most of her music manuscripts are housed at the J. W. Jagger Library at the University of Cape Town.

On 28 March 1987 a concert in celebration of her life and work was held at Wigmore Hall. A pictorial biography, Come and Listen to the Stars Singing, written by her long-term partner June Opie, was published in 1988.

Her centenary on 3 February 2003 was marked by a special program on Australia's ABC Classic FM.

Her "lost" early String Quartet (1922) was given its world premiere on 8 September 2004 at the Tate St Ives Visual Music Week.

Rainier's Movement for strings, substantially completed in 1951 but lacking final revision, was edited by Douglas Young and received its first performance at the BBC Proms on 10 August 2013.

== List of works ==
Orchestral

- Sinfonia da camera for strings (1947)
- Phalaphala, dance concerto (1960)
- Violin Concerto (1963–64)
- Aequora lunae, seven movement orchestral suite (1966–67)
- Ploërmel for wind instruments and percussion (1972–73)
- Due canti e finale for violin and orchestra (1977)
- Concertante for oboe, clarinet and orchestra (1980–81)
- Celebration for violin and orchestra (1984)

Chamber and instrumental

- String Quartet (1939)
- Suite for clarinet and piano (1943)
- Violin Sonata (1946)
- Barbaric Dance Suite for piano (1949)
- Five Pieces for keyboard (1955)
- Six Pieces for five wind instruments (1957)
- Pastoral Triptych for oboe (1958–59)
- Trio-Suite, piano trio (1960)
- Quanta for oboe and string trio (1961–62)
- Suite for violina and cello (1963–65)
- String Trio (1965–66)
- Quinque for harpsichord (1971)
- Organ Gloriana (1972)
- Primordial Canticles for organ (1974)
- Grand Duo for cello and piano (1982)

Vocal

- Three Greek Epigrams (1937)
- Dance of the Rain (1947)
- Ubunzima [Misfortune] (1948)
- Cycle for Declamation (text, John Donne) (1954)
- Requiem (text David Gascoyne) for tenor and unaccompanied choir (1955–56)
- The Bee Oracles (text, Edith Sitwell) for soloists and chamber ensemble (1969)
- Vision and Prayer (test, Dylan Thomas) for tenor and piano (1973)
- Prayers from the Ark for tenor and harpsichord (1974–75)

== Sources ==
- Grove's Dictionary of Music and Musicians, 5th ed, 1954, Eric Blom, ed.
- Amis, John (July 1955). "Priaulx Rainier". Musical Times. p. 354. JSTOR 937279.
- Soden, Oliver. Priaulx Rainier: Fearless and pioneering composer (2021)
