= Peter Frankl =

Hungarian-born British pianist

Peter Frankl (born 2 October 1935) is a Hungarian-born British pianist. He mainly performs music from the Classical period (particularly Mozart), the Romantic period and the early Modern period. His recordings include the complete solo piano music of both Debussy and Schumann.

After studying at the Franz Liszt Academy of Music in Budapest, Frankl won several piano competitions in the late 1950s, including an honorable mention at the V International Chopin Piano Competition. He made his London concert debut in 1962 and first performed in New York in 1967 when he appeared with the Cleveland Orchestra under George Szell. He also studied with Maria Curcio, the last and favourite pupil of Artur Schnabel. Since then he has appeared as soloist with many other orchestras and conductors. He has been a guest at many international festivals, for example performing the Britten piano concerto with the composer conducting at the Edinburgh International Festival.

Frankl's repertoire also includes chamber music. Eleanor Warren of the BBC formed a long-term collaboration between Frankl and his compatriot violinist György Pauk and the American cellist Ralph Kirshbaum. The BBC later commissioned Fourteen Little Pictures by James MacMillan to mark the 25th anniversary of their trio in 1997.

Frankl is Professor of Piano at the Yale School of Music in New Haven, Connecticut. He is also Online Master Teacher at iClassical Academy with whom he has recorded several online Masterclasses.
