= Martin Jarvis (conductor) =

Australian musician

- Born: Martin Jarvis; September 17, 1951 (age 75); Ebbw Vale, Wales
- Education: Welsh College of Music
- Occupation: Professor of music
- Spouse: Erna
- Children: 5

Martin Jarvis OAM (born 17 September 1951, Ebbw Vale, Wales) is an Australian violinist and viola player, founder of the Darwin Symphony Orchestra, and professor and lecturer of music at Charles Darwin University in Darwin, Northern Territory.

== Personal and professional life ==
He won a scholarship to the Welsh College of Music, Cardiff, where he studied violin under Garfield Phillips, concertmaster of the BBC Welsh Orchestra. He studied 1971–75 at the Royal Academy of Music, London, under Clarence Myerscough for violin and Winifred Copperwheat for viola.

Jarvis founded the Darwin Symphony Orchestra, which gave its first concert in 1989 - he ended his term as its artistic director at the end of 2009. Jarvis is professor and lecturer of music at Charles Darwin University (CDU) where he teaches viola, violin, and conducting, and is director of the CDU Confucius Institute.

== Awards ==
Jarvis was a recipient of the Medal of the Order of Australia (OAM) in the 2007 Australia Day Honours.

== Research into Anna Magdalena Bach ==
During his studies at the Royal Academy of Music, his viola teacher Winifred Copperwheat made him aware of problems with the published editions of the six suites for unaccompanied cello commonly attributed to Johann Sebastian Bach. After research of his own, Jarvis has controversially postulated, using handwriting analysis heuristics, that the suites were composed by Bach's wife Anna Magdalena. Other academics such as Stephen Rose have responded that, while Anna Magdalena may have contributed to the labours on his manuscripts, "there is not enough evidence to show that she single-handedly composed the Cello Suites."

Jarvis was awarded a PhD from Charles Darwin University based on his research, and presented his findings at an October 2008 meeting of the International Symposium on the Forensic Sciences in Melbourne. Regarding the generally-accepted portrayal of Anna Magdalena Bach's role in music history and his own differing views, Jarvis himself has acknowledged, "My conclusions may not be wholly accurate, but the way in which tradition has put Anna Magdalena into this pathetic role [as merely the copyist] ... is rubbish." Jarvis published the book Written by Mrs Bach in 2011; it was made into a documentary film in 2014.
