= No Man Is an Island (album) =

1972 debut album by Dennis Brown

No Man is an Island

Studio album by Dennis Brown
- Released: c. 1972
- Recorded: 1969–70
- Studio: Studio One, Kingston, Jamaica
- Genre: Reggae
- Label: Studio One
- Producer: Clement "Coxsone" Dodd

Dennis Brown chronology
No Man is an Island (1972)	If I Follow My Heart (1972)

No Man is an Island is the debut album by reggae singer Dennis Brown. Recorded when Brown was aged between twelve and thirteen, during 1969 and 1970, it includes his debut single, a cover of The Van Dykes' hit "No Man is an Island", a song he had originally worked on with producer Derrick Harriott, and eleven other tracks, all recorded during his time working for Clement "Coxsone" Dodd's Studio One label. The album was first issued circa 1972, by which time Brown had moved on from Studio One to work with other producers. The album features cover versions as well as original compositions by Brown, including "Created by the Father", which has been described as one of his most enduring compositions, and "Make it Easy on Yourself".

== Track listing ==
1. "No Man is an Island"
2. "Going to a Ball"
3. "I Love You Madly"
4. "Rain Drops Keep Falling"
5. "Created By The Father"
6. "I Have Got to Go"
7. "I'll Never Fall in Love"
8. "Make It Easy On Yourself"
9. "Your Love is Amazing"
10. "I Need Someone"
11. "Something Bugging Me"
12. "God Bless The Children"
