= Zorian Quartet =

English all-female string quartet

- The Zorian Quartet: Olive Zorian (violin I); Marjorie Lavers (violin II); Winifred Copperwheat (viola); and Norina Semino (cello)

Background information
- Origin: UK
- Genres: Classical, string quartet

The Zorian Quartet was an English all-female string quartet ensemble. It was founded in 1942 by and named after violinist Olive Zorian. It gave the premiere performances of, and made the first recordings of, several compositions for string quartet by English composers, including Benjamin Britten and Michael Tippett. It also gave the premiere English performances of quartets by Ernest Bloch and Béla Bartók.

The original members were Olive Zorian (1916–65, violin I); Marjorie Lavers (violin II); Winifred Copperwheat (1905–76, viola); and Norina Semino (cello).

Some sources say that the quartet disbanded in 1949. Other sources say that it continued to perform for at least another ten years. The later date is supported by evidence that the violinist Frances Mason and the cellist Eleanor Warren were members of the Zorian Quartet in the 1950s.

== Notable performances and recordings ==
- 27 March 1943 – Tippett, String Quartet No. 2; premiere, Wigmore Hall, London; 1947, premiere recording
- 3 July 1944 – Priaulx Rainier, String Quartet in C; premiere, Wigmore Hall
- 5 March 1945 – Doreen Carwithen, String Quartet No. 1; premiere, Duke's Hall, Royal Academy of Music
- 2–3 July 1945 – Ralph Vaughan Williams, song cycle On Wenlock Edge for voice, piano and string quartet, with Benjamin Britten (piano) and Peter Pears (tenor); Decca 78rpm recording
- 21 November 1945 – Britten, String Quartet No. 2; premiere, Wigmore Hall; 1946, premiere recording His Master's Voice 78 rpm C.3539
- 1946 – Henry Purcell, Fantasia upon One Note Z.745 for string ensemble, with Benjamin Britten (second viola); His Master's Voice 78 rpm recording C.3539
- 19 October 1946 – Tippett, String Quartet No. 3; premiere, Wigmore Hall
- 1948 – at the first Aldeburgh Festival: Tippett, String Quartet No. 2; Purcell, The Golden Sonata (Trio sonata in four parts in F major Z.810, realized by Britten); Frank Bridge, Phantasy Quartet, with Britten (piano)
