= John Amis =

British broadcaster, music critic, and writer (1922–2013)

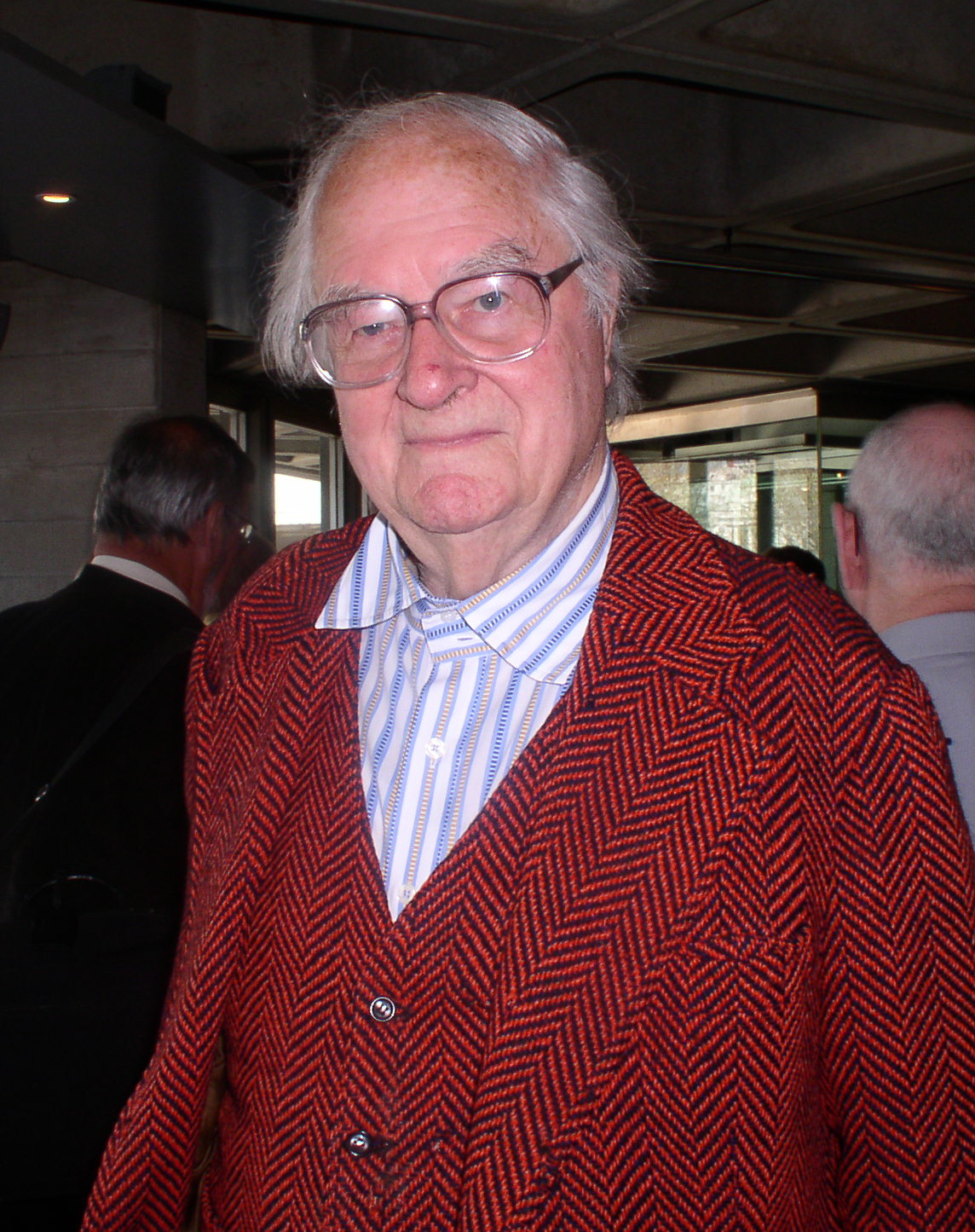
- Amis in 2010
- Born: John Preston Amis; 17 June 1922; Dulwich, London, England
- Died: 1 August 2013 (aged 91)
- Occupation: Music critic
- Website: johnamismusic.blogspot.co.uk

John Preston Amis (17 June 1922 – 1 August 2013) was a British broadcaster, classical music critic, music administrator, and writer. He was a frequent contributor for The Guardian and to BBC radio and television music programming.

== Life and career ==
John Amis was born in Dulwich, London, son of James Amis, whose elder brother, William, was father of the novelist Kingsley Amis. James Amis, wealthier than his brother, "held a post in the merchant bank of Seligmann Brothers in Austin Friars", earning "a respectable £800 a year"; the family's house at West Norwood was "a semi-detached, red-brick affair with... a little lawn at the back with vegetables and a loganberry bush at the bottom"; despite the perceptible difference between the Amis brothers' fortunes, John Amis recalled no "feeling of social difference between Norbury (where Kingsley Amis was raised) and West Norwood. We both lived in dreary houses in dreary streets."

Amis was educated- "fully paid for"- at Dulwich College (having also attended its preparatory school), where he began a lifelong friendship with his contemporary, Donald Swann. The two would collab together as boys, playing piano, sing, and whistle often to create music. Amis would continue to sing and whistle for Swann's music. During his childhood, he suffered serious bout of mastoiditis as a child left him deaf in his left ear. He began his career working in a bank for five and a half weeks before leaving to earn a living in music. Amis had a number of roles, including gramophone record salesman, and orchestra manager (at one point turning pages for Dame Myra Hess during the wartime concerts at the National Gallery.), before becoming a music critic, initially with The Scotsman in 1946. He was for several years manager for Sir Thomas Beecham, and also worked for the London Philharmonic Orchestra.

In 1948, William Glock invited Amis to run a summer school for musicians at Bryanston School, Dorset. The summer school moved to Dartington in 1953. Amis remained administrative director until 1981, during which time he brought to the school a long line of international musicians, amongst them Paul Hindemith, Igor Stravinsky, and Sir Michael Tippett.

Amis' short career as a tenor began with the role of Ishmael in the 1967 recording of Bernard Herrmann's cantata Moby-Dick. He made his operatic debut in 1990 as the Emperor in Turandot. Amis had started singing in earnest after 1959: in that year he attended Professor Frederick Husler's s singing class at Dartington 'just for fun', and was told not only that he had the makings of a Heldentenor, but that he ought to go to Germany to study.

From the 1950s onwards, Amis became a regular contributor to BBC Radio's music output, and worked on BBC Television from 1961, producing and presenting documentaries, and introducing the BBC2 magazine programme Music Now. As a broadcaster, he is probably best known for his appearances as a team member, from 1974 to 1994, on the BBC Radio 4 panel show, My Music, also appearing in the television version. It was on this show that he disclosed an unexpected talent as a skilled siffleur. His own radio show on Radio 3 interviewed musicians and contemporary witnesses such as Sir Isaiah Berlin. For many years he wrote a column on music in The Tablet, England's best-known Catholic magazine.

His friends in the music industry included Noel Mewton-Wood and Felix Aprahamian, for whom he wrote a tribute following Aprahamian's death in January 2005. He was also closely associated with Gerard Hoffnung and organized many of Hoffnung's concerts until the latter's death in 1959; he performed a comic duet from The Barber of Darmstadt with Owen Brannigan at the 1961 Hoffnung Festival. As a critic, Amis often came across contemporaries including Neville Cardus (Manchester Guardian), Frank Howes (The Times), Scott Goddard (News Chronicle) and Richard Capell (Telegraph).

Amis wrote a number of books, on his own Amiscellany imprint, with titles including My Music in London: 1945-2000. Amis spent much of his time giving talks and one-man shows, after dinner speeches and concert works. Amis was a patron of the Music Libraries Trust and the Tait Memorial Trust, and a vice-president of the Putney Music society.

== Personal life ==
In June 1948, Amis married the violinist Olive Zorian, founder of the Zorian String Quartet. The marriage was dissolved in 1955 and Zorian died in 1965.

In the later years of his life, Amis took up with his partner, Isla Baring OAM, Chairman of the Tait Memorial Trust of which he was a Patron. He once said that she gave him his "Indian summer".

== Death and legacy ==
John Amis died on 1 August 2013. He was survived by his partner for his last six years, Isla Baring. His funeral was held on 20 August 2013 at the Musicians' Church, St Sepulchre-without-Newgate in London.

In his memory, the Tait Memorial Trust inaugurated the John Amis Award, a scholarship to support students at the Dartington International Summer School.
