= Anna Magdalena Bach =

2nd wife of J.S. Bach

- Born: Anna Magdalena Wilcke; 22 September 1701; Zeitz
- Died: 27 February 1760 (aged 58); Leipzig
- Occupation: Singer
- Spouse: Johann Sebastian Bach
- Children: 13

Anna Magdalena Bach (née Wilcke; 22 September 1701 – 27 February 1760) was a German professional singer and the second wife of Johann Sebastian Bach.

== Biography ==
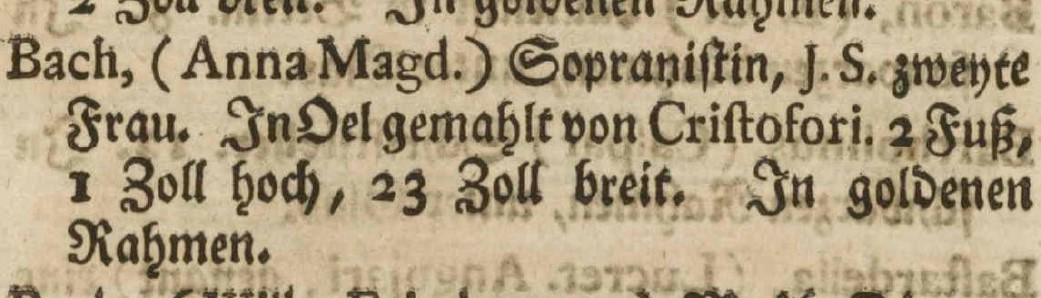
Bach, (Anna Magd.) Soprano, J.S. second wife. Painted in oil by Cristofori. 2 feet 1 inch high, 23 inches wide. In a gold frame. Entry in the Catalogue of the musical estate of the deceased music director Carl Philipp Emanuel Bach (1714–1788), a stepson of Anna Magdalena Bach, printed in Hamburg in 1790. This painting is lost. Today, there is no portrait of her that can be regarded as authentic.

Anna Magdalena Wilcke was born at Zeitz, in the Duchy of Saxe-Zeitz. While little is known about her early musical education, the family was musical. Her father, Johann Caspar Wilcke (c. 1660–1733), was a trumpet player, who had a career at the courts of Zeitz and Weißenfels. Her mother, Margaretha Elisabeth Liebe, was the daughter of an organist.

By 1721, Anna Magdalena was employed as a soprano singer at the princely court of Anhalt-Cöthen. Johann Sebastian Bach had been working there as Capellmeister (director of music) since December 1717. Johann Sebastian, 36, married the 20-year-old Anna Magdalena on 3 December of that year, seventeen months after the death of his first wife, Maria Barbara Bach. Later that month, the couple's employer, Prince Leopold of Anhalt-Cöthen, married Frederica Henriette of Anhalt-Bernburg. Bach believed the princess' lack of interest in music caused the musical life at the court to decline, although there is evidence that other factors were involved. There were budgetary constraints of which Bach may have had limited knowledge, as it is unlikely that the prince would have discussed his financial problems with Bach. In May 1723, the Bachs moved to Leipzig, where Johann Sebastian had been appointed Cantor of the Thomasschule and music director of the town.

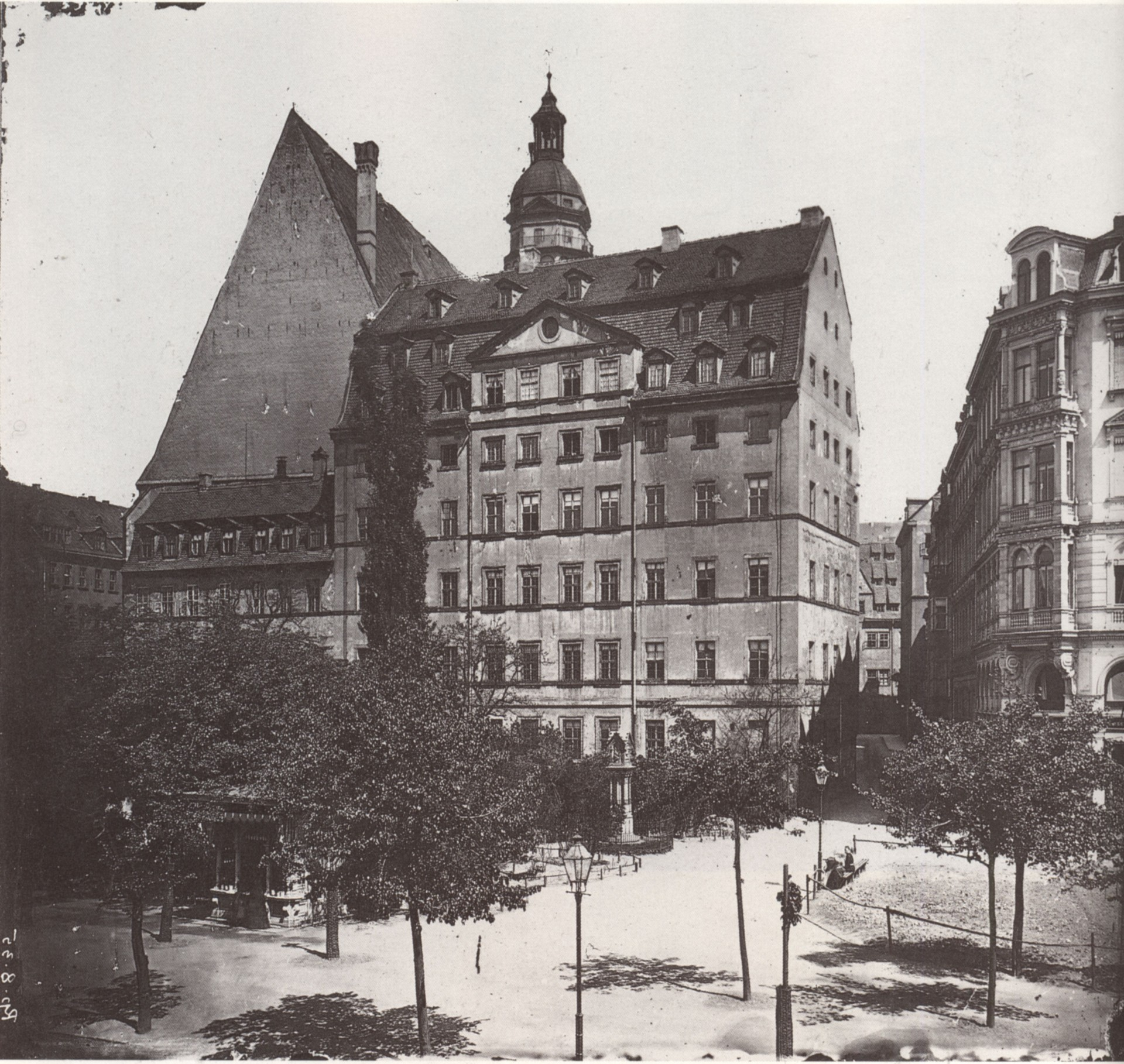
St. Thomas School in Leipzig (photo pre-1885). The Bach family apartment was on the right side, extended over four floors (three floors before the renovation in 1731/32), and was over 2200 square feet in size. The building was pulled down in 1902. (The first Bach monument in the world can be seen in front of the St. Thomas School. It was initiated by Felix Mendelssohn Bartholdy who donated it to the city in 1843. It still survives today.)

Anna Magdalena continued to sing professionally after her marriage. In one notable example of her continuing involvement with music, she returned to Köthen in 1729 to sing at Prince Leopold's funeral.

Her husband brought four children into the marriage. Between 1723 and 1742, she gave birth to the following children: Christiana Sophia Henrietta (⁕spring 1723 †29 June 1726); Gottfried Heinrich (⁕26 February 1724 ⚰12 February 1763); Christian Gottlieb (〰14 April 1725 †21 September 1728); Elisabeth Juliana Friderica, called "Liesgen", who married Bach's pupil Johann Christoph Altnickol (〰5 April 1726 †24 August 1781); Ernestus Andreas (〰30 October 1727 †1 November 1727); Regina Johanna (〰10 October 1728 †25 April 1733); Christiana Benedicta (〰1 January 1730 †4 January 1730); Christiana Dorothea (〰18 March 1731 †31 August 1732); Johann Christoph Friedrich, called "Friedrich", the 'Bückeburg' Bach (⁕21 June 1732 †26 January 1795); Johann August Abraham (〰5 November 1733 †6 November 1733); Johann Christian, called "Christel", the 'London' Bach (⁕5 September 1735 – †1 January 1782); Johanna Carolina (〰30 October 1737 †18 August 1781) and Regina Susanna (〰22 February 1742 †14 December 1809)

As can be seen from the dates, seven of her 13 children died before reaching adulthood. Only during the ten weeks from June to August 1732 were five of the couple’s children younger than 10 years of age living in the household. Otherwise, there were four or less. Anna Magdalena was seriously ill seven months before the birth of her last daughter Regina Susanna, and it is not known whether this was related to the pregnancy.

With the marriage Anna Magdalena became Frau Capellmeisterin Bach, because she had the right to bear the title of her husband. It was not the job of a lady of her standing to cook, clean the apartment or do the washing. There were service personnel for this. Infants were nourished by wet nurses. Together with her husband, Anna Magdalena Bach commanded a household to which not only the children belonged, but also private students and servants. In this household the livelihood was earned through music. As a musician herself and the daughter of a court trumpeter, Anna Magdalena had the abilities and experience to monitor and participate in the activities. In the Bach family household works composed by Johann Sebastian were copied and prepared for performance. Performances were rehearsed, music was traded, private students taught, instruments rented out and sold. Anna Magdalena cooperated in all these areas. When her husband was away examining organs or for other reasons, she was responsible for running the business. The entire household could also have been organised such that she could accompany him. After the death of her husband a cantata for the council election was commissioned from her – proof that she was capable of organising such a performance. Several copies of her husband’s compositions made by her have survived. Some of these are of high musicological significance as many of his own manuscripts are lost. Apart from music, Anna Magdalena was interested in flowers.

Johann Sebastian Bach died on 28 July 1750.

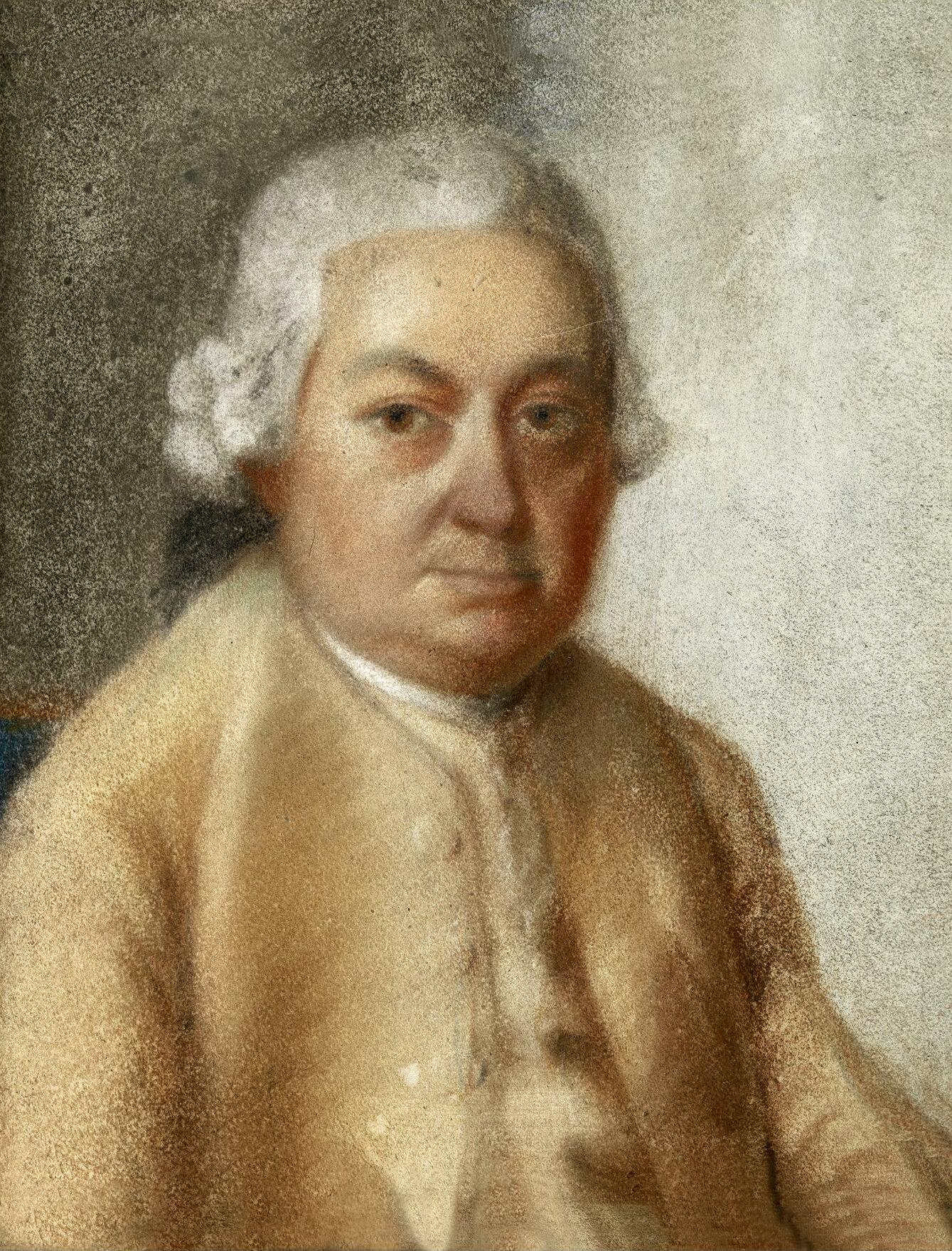
Carl Philipp Emanuel Bach. Anna Magdalena Bach stayed in contact with her stepson until the end of her life.

As he left immature children, a will naming his wife as sole heir would have been invalid. In the case of the Bach family a committee of executors from Leipzig University ensured that these children were given their share of the inheritance. Anna Magdalena Bach took on the administration of these shares. During the distribution of the estate, she found herself in a position to cover the debts of her sister and paid the other heirs a sum equivalent to a year’s salary of a fully trained miner in Electoral Saxony. In 1751 she supported a mine with at least the equivalent of a week’s pay of such a miner. The widow Anna Magdalena took responsibility for her two youngest daughters, aged 8 and 12 years on their father’s death, and her 26-year-old mentally disabled son Gottfried Heinrich. She moved with them to the Neuer Kirchhof in Leipzig. The only child who left home was Johann Christian who moved to his half-brother Carl Philipp Emanuel in Berlin for his further education.

While her husband was alive the family had an income many times higher than that of a craftsman. The widowed Anna Magdalena was not able to maintain her previous standard of living. She therefore received support from various institutions. She also worked for her living. With the distribution of the estate, she enabled herself to rent out furnished accommodation. There is evidence for her music trading activities. Among others she sold copies of the Art of Fugue, which she had published together with her sons, as well as the textbook The True Art of Playing the Keyboards by Carl Philipp Emanuel Bach, her stepson with whom she stayed in contact until the end of her life. As she also possessed manuscripts from her husband, she was able to offer copies of these works. How her life developed in the subsequent years, especially during the Seven Years' War, is not known. She died on 27 February 1760 and was buried on 29 February in St. John’s cemetery in Leipzig.

== Dismissed claim of composership ==
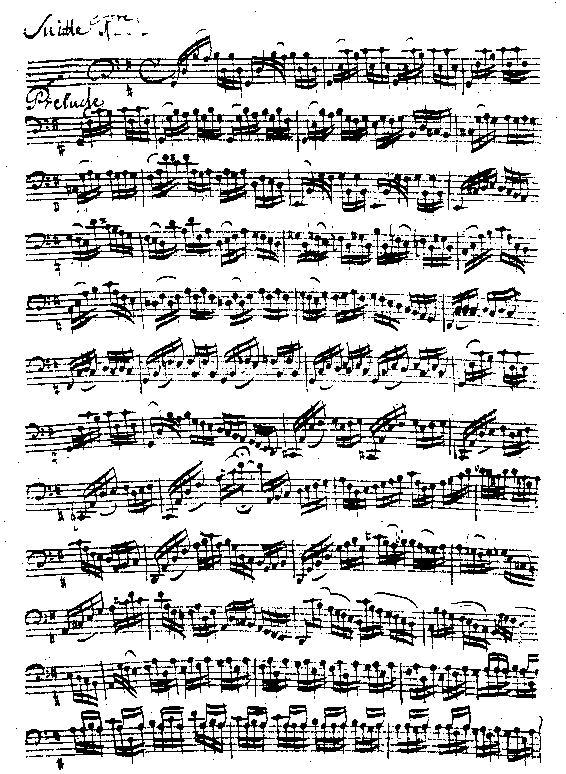
The first page of the Suite No. 1 in G major, BWV 1007 in Anna Magdalena Bach's handwriting

Recently, it was suggested Anna Magdalena Bach composed several musical pieces bearing her husband's name: Professor Martin Jarvis of the School of Music at Charles Darwin University in Darwin, Australia, claims she composed the famed six cello suites (BWV 1007–1012) and was involved with the composition of the aria from the Goldberg Variations (BWV 988) and the opening prelude of The Well-Tempered Clavier. These ideas were also made into a TV documentary Written by Mrs Bach.

These claims are virtually unanimously dismissed by Bach scholars and performers. Christoph Wolff said:

When I served as director of the Leipzig Bach Archive from 2001 to 2013, I and my colleagues there extensively refuted the basic premises of the thesis, on grounds of documents, manuscript sources, and musical grounds. There is not a shred of evidence, but Jarvis doesn't give up despite the fact that several years ago, at a Bach conference in Oxford, a room full of serious Bach scholars gave him an embarrassing showdown.

Writing in The Guardian, cellist Steven Isserlis said, "I'm afraid that his theory is pure rubbish," and continued, "How can anybody take this shoddy material seriously?"

Bach scholar Ruth Tatlow has written a refutation at length, centred on the TV documentary, in the journal Understanding Bach, where she calls Jarvis's claims "flawed and untenable".

== See also ==
- Notebook for Anna Magdalena Bach
- The Chronicle of Anna Magdalena Bach – a Straub-Huillet film about Johann Sebastian and Anna Magdalena Bach
