= Ralph Kirshbaum =

American cellist (born 1946)

- Born: 4 March 1946 (age 80); Denton, Texas, US
- Genre: Classical
- Occupations: Musician; pedagogue
- Instrument: Cello
- Labels: EMI; RCA Red Seal; Virgin Classics; Philips; Chandos

Ralph Henry Kirshbaum (born March 4, 1946) is an American cellist. His award-winning career combines the worlds of solo performance, chamber music, recording and pedagogy.

== Early life and education ==
Kirshbaum was born in Denton, Texas, and raised in Tyler. His father, Joseph Kirshbaum (1911–1996), was a professional violinist, composer, conductor, music educator, and an alumnus of Yale University, where he had also taught. From 1944 to 1947, Joseph Kirshbaum was on the faculty of University of North Texas College of Music, where he also conducted its symphony orchestra. Prior to joining the North Texas faculty, Joseph Kirshbaum had directed the Messiah Festival Orchestra in Lindsborg, Kansas, the string orchestra of the Oberlin Conservatory, and taught in the string department of Cornell University. For 25 years, he was also a celebrated conductor of the East Texas Symphony Orchestra, which he had founded. Ralph Kirshbaum's mother, Gertrude Morris Kirshbaum (1912–1973), was a harpist and taught at Texas Woman's University.

Kirshbaum started cello lessons with his father at the age of six. At eleven, he continued lessons with Roberta Guastafeste (née Harrison), who was on the music faculty at Southern Methodist University. At fourteen years old, he began studying with Lev Aronson, who was then the principal cellist of the Dallas Symphony Orchestra. He won numerous awards as a student and appeared as a soloist with the Dallas Symphony at the age of fifteen.

Kirshbaum continued his education at the Yale University’s School of Music, where he studied with Aldo Parisot. He graduated Yale magna cum laude and Phi Beta Kappa with highest departmental honors. In 1968 he earned a Fulbright fellowship, but Selective Service registration issues prevented him from using it.

== Career ==
Kirshbaum attracted international attention when he won prizes in the 1969 International Gaspar Cassadó Competition in Florence, and subsequently in the 1970 International Tchaikovsky Competition in Moscow. He made his London debut recital at Wigmore Hall in 1970, his professional orchestral debut with the New Philharmonia Orchestra in 1972, and his New York debut at the Metropolitan Museum of Art in 1976.

In his career, Kirshbaum has appeared as soloist with many of the world's major orchestras including the London Symphony Orchestra, Boston Symphony Orchestra, Chicago Symphony Orchestra, Cleveland Orchestra, Los Angeles Philharmonic, San Francisco Symphony, Orchestre de Paris, Israel Philharmonic Orchestra, Deutsches Symphonie-Orchester Berlin, Munich Philharmonic, Tonhalle-Orchester Zürich, London Philharmonic Orchestra, BBC Symphony Orchestra, Philharmonia Orchestra, Hallé Orchestra, Helsinki Philharmonic Orchestra, Royal Stockholm Philharmonic Orchestra, Pittsburgh Symphony Orchestra, Houston Symphony Orchestra, Dallas Symphony Orchestra, and many others. He has also performed with distinguished conductors such as Christoph von Dohnányi, Sir Colin Davis, Kurt Masur, Zubin Mehta, Sir Antonio Pappano, Sir André Previn, Sir Simon Rattle, and Sir Georg Solti.

As a chamber musician, Kirshbaum has collaborated with artists such as Yefim Bronfman, Peter Frankl, György Pauk, Itzhak Perlman, Pinchas Zukerman, Midori, Joshua Bell, Gil Shaham, Vadim Repin, Lang Lang, Leif Ove Andsnes, Garrick Ohlsson, as well as the Juilliard String Quartet, Emerson String Quartet and the Tokyo String Quartet among many others. In particular, his longtime piano trio collaboration with Frankl and Pauk has generated a large number of concerts and recordings. The BBC commissioned Fourteen Little Pictures by James MacMillan to mark their 25th anniversary in 1997.

Kirshbaum founded the RNCM Manchester International Cello Festival in 1988 and was its Artistic Director through to its grand finale in 2007. The festival was held at the Royal Northern College of Music, where he was on the faculty for 38 years.

In the fall of 2008, Kirshbaum assumed an appointment at the University of Southern California Thornton School of Music as (i) Chair of the Strings Department and (ii) Gregor Piatigorsky Chair in Cello, an endowed position. He is the fourth person to hold the Piatigorsky Chair. The three predecessors were Lynn Harrell (1986–1993), Ronald Leonard (1993–2003) and Eleonore Schoenfeld (2004–2007).

Kirshbaum’s cello was crafted in 1729 by the Venetian maker Domenico Montagnana. The instrument was previously played by the Italian cellist Carlo Alfredo Piatti.

== Personal life ==
Kirshbaum and his wife, Antoinette, have one son, Alex, who studied music at the Rimon Music School in Israel.

== Selected discography ==
- Bach: Cello Suites. EMI/Virgin Classics. (recorded 1993; released 2000, 2002, 2004).
- Barber: Cello Concerto, with the Scottish Chamber Orchestra; Sonata, with Roger Vignoles, piano. Virgin Classics. (2001)
- Beethoven: Piano Trio No. 7, Op. 97 ("Archduke"), and Dvořák: Piano Trio, Op. 90 ("Dumky"), with György Pauk, violin, and Peter Frankl, piano. BBC.
- Brahms: Double Concerto; Beethoven: Triple Concerto, with Pinchas Zukerman, violin, John Browning, piano, and London Symphony Orchestra. RCA. (1998)
- Brahms: Piano Trios, with György Pauk, violin, and Peter Frankl, piano. EMI/Angel.
- Elgar: Cello Concerto; Walton: Cello Concerto, with Royal Scottish National Orchestra. Chandos. (recorded 1979; released 1994, 2001, 2006)
- Haydn: Cello Concerto No. 2; Sinfonia Concertante, with Pinchas Zukerman, violin, Gordon Hunt, oboe, Robin O'Neill, bassoon, and the English Chamber Orchestra. RCA/BMG. (1993)
- Prokofiev: Cello Sonata; Shostakovich: Cello Sonata; Rachmaninov: Vocalise, with Peter Jablonski, piano. (recorded 2005; released 2007)
- Tippett: Triple Concerto, with György Pauk, violin, Nobuko Imai, viola, Sir Colin Davis, conductor, and the London Symphony Orchestra. Philips/London/Decca. (1990) (world premiere recording; The Gramophone magazine’s Record of the Year)

== Sources ==
- Campbell, Margaret. The Great Cellists, Robson Books (2004), pps. 306–307; ISBN 1-86105-654-0
