= György Pauk =

Hungarian violinist (1936–2024)

- Born: 26 October 1936; Budapest, Kingdom of Hungary
- Died: 18 November 2024 (aged 88) Budapest, Hungary
- Genre: Classical
- Occupations: Violinist; educator
- Instrument: Violin
- Labels: Naxos; Hungaroton

György Pauk (26 October 1936 – 18 November 2024) was a Hungarian violinist, chamber musician and music pedagogue.

== Biography ==
Pauk was born on 26 October 1936 in Budapest, Hungary, the son of Imre Pauk and Magda (nee Lustig). His father was a manager at the Lustig and Gluck Transportation Company. His mother was a pianist and the daughter of the company's owner. Pauk's father was taken away by the Hungarian SS in 1942 and starved to death in a labour camp in Ukraine; his mother was murdered following a raid later that year by Hungarian fascists belonging to the Arrow Cross party. Pauk was raised in poverty by his grandmother in the Budapest ghetto under the protection of a Swedish diplomat, Raoul Wallenberg, and his chief memory was of hunger.

== Musical career ==
Pauk had started learning the violin at the age of five and resumed his studies after the war. He entered the Franz Liszt Academy of Music at the age of nine in 1945 and studied as Imre Waldbauer's pupil. From 1947 to 1949 he studied with János Temesváry, and from 1949 until he graduated he studied with Zoltán Kodály and Ede Zathureczky, an associate of Bartok's. He made his debut in a Beethoven sonata accompanied by Peter Frankl, and at the age of fourteen he performed Kabalevsky's Violin Concerto. During a solo performance in Nandor Zsolt's Valse Caprice he broke his E-string but continued by playing the higher passages on the A-string. With three colleagues from the academy he formed the Pauk Quartet. A recording of their Schumann's Quintet was reviewed in Gramophone magazine.

In 1956 he was selected to take part in the Long-Thibaud Violin Competition but was refused permission to attend. He won competitions in Genoa in 1956 and Munich in 1957. In 1958, when he and Frankl were performing in France, both sought political asylum. After working in Paris, Pauk accepted an offer to become co-leader of the Brabant Orchestra in the Netherlands. In 1959 he took first prize at the Long-Thibaud competition with a performance of Glazunov's Violin Concerto. After being persuaded by violinist Yehudi Menuhin, he settled permanently in London in 1961. In December 1961 he stepped in at short notice to perform Beethoven's Violin Concerto at the Royal Festival Hall with the London Mozart Players under Harry Blech. In 1962 he made the first of many appearances at London's Wigmore Hall, where he performed with pianists including Frankl, Geoffrey Parsons and Roger Vignoles.

In 1964 he toured Australia. In 1968 he made his Proms debut at the Royal Albert Hall with the Halle Orchestra conducted by John Barbirolli, performing Mozart's G major Violin Concerto. He also played with Hungarian musicians including Georg Solti. In 1972 Solti took him to Chicago. With the encouragement of pianist Annie Fischer, who said he should show the music lovers of Hungary what he had achieved, Pauk returned to perform in Budapest in 1973.

Pauk performed as a concerto soloist with various orchestras and conductors, including Pierre Boulez, Sir Colin Davis, Lorin Maazel, Gennady Rozhdestvensky, Simon Rattle, and Sir Georg Solti. He also recorded and premiered works by Witold Lutosławski, Krzysztof Penderecki, Alfred Schnittke, Sir Peter Maxwell Davies and Sir Michael Tippett, conducted by the composers themselves.

As a chamber musician, Pauk's repertoire included all of the Mozart sonatas, which he also recorded; the Schubert sonatas; and Bartók's works for violin. Pauk and pianist Peter Frankl formed a long-term collaboration with cellist Ralph Kirshbaum. Pauk and Frankl had been musical partners since they were children. They studied chamber music with Leo Weiner. The BBC commissioned Fourteen Little Pictures by James MacMillan to mark the 25th anniversary of their trio in 1997.

Pauk played a Stradivarius violin made in 1714 that had previously been owned by Joseph Massart. He was appointed professor of violin at the Royal Academy of Music in London in 1987. He named the violin department at the Royal Academy of Music after Zathureczky because he wanted to continue his teacher's legacy.

Pauk gave master classes at the International Menuhin Music Academy. He regularly visited the United States, giving master classes in Los Angeles, San Francisco, Oberlin College and the Juilliard School of Music. Pauk was an online master teacher at iClassical Academy. His musical career continued until he retired from performing in 2007. At his peak he was giving 80 to 100 concerts a year.

== Private life and death ==
In 1959 Pauk married ZsuZsa (Susie) Mautner, a Hungarian chemistry student who was working at the Heineken Beer company. They had two children, a son and a daughter.

Pauk died from complications of a fall in Budapest on 18 November 2024, at the age of 88.

== Autobiography ==
- Négy húron pendülök. Nyolcvan év emlékei (in Hungarian). Budapest: Park Könyvkiadó, 2016. ISBN 978-963-355-315-2.

== Awards ==
- First Prize in the 1956 (first) Paganini Competition in Genoa, Italy
- Premier Grand Prix in 1959 at the Marguerite Long-Jacques Thibaud Competition
- First Prize at the Munich Sonata Competition with Peter Frankl (1956)
- Cecilia Prize for Outstanding Recordings
- Grammy nomination for Record of the Year
- Professor Emeritus of the Franz Liszt Academy in Budapest
- Honorary Doctorate by the University of London 2016

== Notable students ==
Pauk's notable students include Thomas Gould, Maureen Smith, Marianne Thorsen, Gyula Stuller, and Lucy Gould.
