= Handsworth Revolution =

Studio album by Steel Pulse
- Released: July 1978
- Recorded: 1977
- Genre: Roots reggae
- Length: 37:57
- Label: Island
- Producer: Karl Pitterson

Steel Pulse chronology
Handsworth Revolution (1978)	Tribute to the Martyrs (1979)

Professional ratings
Review scores
Source	Rating
AllMusic	4.5/5 stars
Christgau's Record Guide	B

Handsworth Revolution is the debut album by British reggae band Steel Pulse. It is named after the Handsworth district of Birmingham, England, the band's home district to which the album was dedicated.

Handsworth Revolution peaked at No. 9 on the UK Pop Album charts and No. 34 on the Swedish Pop Album charts.

== Background ==
The first Steel Pulse single for Island Records, "Ku Klux Klan" (a call for resistance against forces of racism), was released in February 1978. Five months later, their debut album was released to critical acclaim. Handsworth Revolution was produced by Karl Pitterson, who had worked with Bob Marley, Bunny Wailer and Peter Tosh. The album reached #9 on the British charts ten days after its release. The band would soon support Bob Marley & the Wailers on a 12-date European tour in June and July 1978, including concerts in Paris, Ibiza, Gothenburg, Stockholm, Oslo, Rotterdam, Amsterdam and Brussels. The tour kicked off with an outdoor festival at the New Bingley Hall in Stafford. David Hinds recalls:

We learned a lot of discipline on that tour that rubbed off - rehearsal, execution on stage, how to tour, stability [...] that's when the doors really started to open for us. It has always been one of the most memorable moments of my career. To play as part of that package exposed Steel Pulse to audiences that literally were in awe of our message. Of course, being formally introduced through Bob Marley helped us tremendously. Playing for audiences, especially those in Paris who saw the force of Steel Pulse and the force of Bob Marley play on the same bill, enabled us to sell out shows every time since then.

Steel Pulse headlined its own tour in 1978 and released two more singles from the album: "Prodigal Son" and "Prediction." Mykaell Riley left the band because of musical differences and went on to success with the Reggae Philharmonic Orchestra and as producer for a number of top artists and TV themes. His departure propelled Hinds into the spotlight and in an attempt to draw a stronger black audience, the group adopted the banner of the Rastafari movement. Appearances on television included mainstream shows like Top of the Pops and Rock Goes to College. At one of their Rock Against Racism appearances, in Victoria Park, East London in April 1978, more than 80,000 people watched a concert that also included the Clash, Tom Robinson Band and X-Ray Spex.

A live performance of the track "Macka Splaff" appeared on a 1978 Virgin Records compilation album called Short Circuit: Live at the Electric Circus, alongside offerings by The Fall, Joy Division, Buzzcocks and John Cooper Clarke. Two of their tracks were also included in the film Reggae in Babylon that documented the reggae movement in the UK in 1978, alongside Aswad, Matumbi, Jimmy Lindsay and Alton Ellis.

== Track listing ==
All songs written by David Hinds except as shown.

1. "Handsworth Revolution"
2. "Bad Man"
3. "Soldiers"
4. "Sound Check"
5. "Prodigal Son" (Basil Gabbidon, Ronald McQueen, Selwyn Brown, David Hinds, Alphonso Martin, Steve Nisbett, Mykaell Riley)
6. "Ku Klux Klan"
7. "Prediction"
8. "Macka Splaff" (Basil Gabbidon, Ronald McQueen, Selwyn Brown, David Hinds, Alphonso Martin, Steve Nisbett, Mykaell Riley)

== Personnel ==
Steel Pulse

- David Hinds - lead vocals, rhythm guitar
- Alphonso Martin – vocals, percussion
- Mykaell Riley - vocals, percussion
- Basil Gabbidon - lead guitar, vocals
- Selwyn Brown - keyboards, vocals, percussion
- Ronald McQueen - bass, percussionon
- Steve Nisbett - drums

Technical

- Steve Lillywhite, Godwin Logie - producers on "Ku Klux Klan"
- Godwin Logie - engineer
- Pete King - executive producer, management
- Andrew Aloof - cover illustration
