= Caught You =

Studio album by Steel Pulse
- Released: 1980
- Genre: Reggae
- Length: 39:16
- Label: Mango, Island
- Producer: Geoffrey Chung; Del Newman on "Reggae Fever"

Steel Pulse chronology
Tribute to the Martyrs (1979)	Caught You (1980)	True Democracy (1982)

Caught You is the third album by the reggae band Steel Pulse, released in 1980. It was released in the United States as Reggae Fever. Caught You was the band's final album for Island Records.

== Critical reception ==
Professional ratings
Review scores
Source	Rating
AllMusic	4/5 stars
Robert Christgau	A−
The Encyclopedia of Popular Music	3/5 stars
The Rolling Stone Album Guide	3/5 stars

Rick Anderson of AllMusic wrote that "while there were still heavy messages to be found in songs like 'Harassment' and 'Nyahbinghi Voyage', the band's jazzbo tendencies were front and center." Trouser Press called the album "Steel Pulse at its most pop-oriented," but lamented the "increasing tendency towards preachy, trite lyrics."

== Track listing ==
All songs written by David Hinds except as shown.

1. "Drug Squad" – 3:53
2. "Harassment" – 4:18
3. "Reggae Fever" – 3:26
4. "Shining" (Alphonso Martin) – 3:55
5. "Heart of Stone (Chant Them)" – 5:00
6. "Rumours (Not True)" – 3:52
7. "Caught You Dancing" – 3:25
8. "Burning Flame" – 3:09
9. "Higher Than High" (Basil Gabbidon) – 3:18
10. "Nyahbinghi Voyage" – 5:00

== Personnel ==
- David Hinds – lead vocals, guitar
- Basil Gabbidon – lead guitar
- Selwyn Brown – keyboards, backing vocals
- Ronald "Stepper" McQueen – bass
- Steve Nisbett – drums, percussion
- Alphonso Martin – percussion, backing vocals
