= True Democracy =

Studio album by Steel Pulse
- Released: 1 March 1982
- Recorded: 1981
- Studios: "Feedback", Aarhus, Denmark
- Genre: Reggae
- Length: 41:50
- Label: Wise Man Doctrine
- Producer: Karl Pitterson

Steel Pulse chronology
Caught You (1980)	True Democracy (1982)	Earth Crisis (1984)

True Democracy is a studio album by the British reggae band Steel Pulse. It was released on 1 March 1982 through the band's own label Wise Man Doctrine Records.

The album got to at least No. 14 on the Independent Albums Chart. In the US it peaked at No. 120 on the Billboard 200.

== Production ==
When the band started work on the album, they had no record deal. While on tour in New York in 1981 they met Karl Pitterson, with whom they recorded five demos. While the demos didn't prompt any offers from major labels, a small Danish label offered the use of their studios to record an album.

The album was recorded over 25 days at Feedback Studios in Aarhus, with Pitterson producing.

It was released in March 1982 through the band's own label Wise Man Doctrine Records. It was later released through Elektra Records for distribution in the United States.

== Critical reception ==
Professional ratings
Review scores
Source	Rating
AllMusic	4/5 stars
Robert Christgau	B
The Encyclopedia of Popular Music	3/5 stars
The Rolling Stone Album Guide	3/5 stars

Boo Browning of The Washington Post called True Democracy "a cheerful album, almost buoyant in its musical exhortations to dance even as its lyrics tackle less-than-merry topics."

Style Weekly, in 2018, called it "still ... one of the most danceable political albums ever."

== Track listing ==
All tracks written by David Hinds, except where noted.

1. "Chant a Psalm" – 4:30
2. "Ravers" – 3:56
3. "Find It... Quick!" – 3:26
4. "A Who Responsible?" – 3:54
5. "Worth His Weight in Gold (Rally Round)" – 4:35
6. "Leggo Beast" – 3:44
7. "Blues Dance Raid" – 4:53
8. "Your House" – 3:42
9. "Man No Sober" – 4:29
10. "Dub Marcus Say" (Phonso Martin) – 4:41

== Bonus tracks for CD ==
1. "Ravers [12" Version]" - 5:56
2. "Leggo Beast [12" Version]" - 6:40
3. "Your House [Dub Version]" - 3:50
4. "A Who Responsible? [Dub Version]" - 4:00

== Personnel ==
Steel Pulse

- Ronald "Stepper" McQueen - bass
- Steve "Grizzly" Nesbitt - drums
- Selwyn Brown (musician) - keyboard, vocals
- Alphonso Martin - percussion, vocals
- David Hinds - guitar, vocals
- Basil Gabbidon - lead guitar

Technical

- Cover Concept - Steel Pulse
- Art Direction - Ron Coro
- Design - Kathy Morphesis
- Photography - Eric Watson
