= Earth Crisis (album) =

Studio album by Steel Pulse
- Released: January 1984
- Recorded: 1983
- Studio: Jacobs, Farnham, Surrey; Horizon, Coventry
- Genre: Reggae
- Length: 38:44
- Label: Wise Man Doctrine
- Producer: Jimmy Haynes, Steel Pulse

Steel Pulse chronology
True Democracy (1982)	Earth Crisis (1984)	Babylon the Bandit (1986)

Professional ratings
Review scores
Source	Rating
AllMusic	2.5/5 stars

Earth Crisis is a studio album by the British roots reggae band Steel Pulse. It was released through the band's own label Wise Man Doctrine Records in January 1984. The album peaked at No. 34 on the Dutch Album Top 100.

== Background ==
Earth Crisis was Steel Pulse's fifth studio album. Images of historical figures like American president Ronald Reagan, Soviet leader Yuri Andropov and Pope John Paul II are upon the album's cover. Metalcore band Earth Crisis took their name from this album, because its cover portrayed many of the things they "would stand against", such as the starving African children, the two blocs of the Cold War and Klansmen. The album was licensed to Elektra Records for release in the North American market.

== Critical reception ==
Trouser Press' Jim Green and Bud Kliment claimed "tasty use of synth and sharp production make (Earth Crisis) their finest, most consistent album since Tribute to the Martyrs". Allmusic's Victor W. Valdivia, in a 2.5/5 star review, wrote "Had the songs been more focused, the production less slick, and the album sequenced correctly, Earth Crisis would stand as a watershed album of the '80s. As it stands, it's certainly worth hearing, but probably not the place where newcomers should be introduced to Steel Pulse's talents." Neil Spencer of NME also noted "Earth Crisis boasts no musical breakthroughs but it's a bright, polished and winningly confident affair and not without the occasional blood drawing edge."

== Track listing ==
All tracks written by David Hinds.

1. "Steppin' Out" – 4:02
2. "Tightrope" – 4:10
3. "Throne of Gold" – 4:25
4. "Roller Skates" – 4:54
5. "Earth Crisis" – 4:55
6. "Bodyguard" – 4:26
7. "Grab Education" – 6:12
8. "Wild Goose Chase" – 5:40

== Personnel ==
Steel Pulse

- Steve "Grizzly" Nisbett - drums, percussion
- Selwyn "Bumbo" Brown - keyboards, vocals
- David Hinds - lead vocals, rhythm and lead guitar
- Alphonso Martin - percussion, vocals
- Ronald "Stepper" McQueen - bass
- Jimmy Haynes - bass, lead guitar
- Carl Atkins - saxophone solo

== Charts ==
Chart	Peak position
Dutch Album Top 100	34
US Billboard 200	154
