= Elouise Edwards =

British community worker and civil rights activist (1932–2021)

- Born: Elouise Edwards; 28 December 1932; Georgetown, British Guiana
- Died: 22 January 2021 (aged 88); Georgetown, Guyana
- Occupation: Community worker
- Years active: 1961–1998

Elouise Edwards MBE (28 December 1932 – 22 January 2021) was a community activist and civil rights campaigner. She was born in British Guiana and moved to Manchester, England in the 1960s, becoming known for her campaigns to fight racial discrimination and to develop community services in the Moss Side area of Manchester. Her work included housing projects, women's networking groups, medical assistance programs, and the development of art and cultural programs.

== Early life and education ==
Elouise Chandler was born on 28 December 1932 in Georgetown, British Guiana to Erica (née Grimes) and Samuel Chandler. She was the youngest of ten children in the family of five daughters and five sons. Her father was an engineer who worked in the gold mining industry and her mother raised the children, until her death when Elouise was six years old. Chandler was sent to live in a boarding school and attended the Ursuline Convent's school in Georgetown. On weekends and holidays, she would travel with her father between settlements on the Potaro River, as he worked on a dredge operation engaged in extracting ore.

In 1955, Chandler married Beresford Edwards at St. George's Cathedral and three years later, the couple had a son. Beresford, or Berry as he was commonly known, was a printer and wanted to further his education in England. Edwards was not in favour of moving, but in 1960 Berry went abroad to study lithography. In 1961, Edwards and her son, Beresford Jr migrated to join her husband, who was working in a box-making facility in Levenshulme. Eventually, Berry was able to find work as a printer and served as a shop steward for the Society of Graphical and Allied Trades, a printers union, and then later as a youth worker. Edwards found life in England very difficult. The weather was very different and the racist culture that existed in many institutions created hostility toward the West Indian community.

Finding rental accommodation was difficult for people of colour and many landlords refused to rent to non-whites. The Edwards lived in several shared housing situations, but could find no bank willing to grant them a mortgage. Berry turned to community members, who had helped him bring his family to Britain. By pooling their money in a system they called "Pardner", savers took turns having access to the accumulated balance to use for various needs. Through the use of Pardner, the Edwards eventually bought a house at 78 Platt Street.

== Activism and career ==
The couple's home quickly became a meeting place for members of the West Indian community living in Manchester and it was there that the West Indian Organisations Coordinating Committee was founded in 1964, with the help of Betty Luckham. The group focused on assisting youth and the West Indian community by developing cultural, economic, and social programs for their benefit and served as an umbrella organisation for the formation of other groups. Initially, they kept a posting board of employers who would hire Black workers, landlords who would rent to them, and places from which community members could seek legal advice. Noting the frequency of second-generation African and Caribbean men being diagnosed with mental illnesses without foundation, CHEL was formed in the early 1970s. The group, named after its founders Charles Moore, Hartley Hanley, Edwards, and Les Chambers, established protocols to assist families and individuals who were labeled inappropriately as "schizophrenic" or "mad" and unwillingly incarcerated in mental institutions.

Edwards began her career as a kitchen worker at the Manchester University refectory. She then worked at the Piccadilly Gardens Hotel. From the late 1960s, Manchester began implementing a plan of slum clearance, as a part of their urban regeneration planning. The Edwards' home was targeted for demolition], as were those of many of their neighbours' homes in Moss Side. To protest the top-down renovation and relocation schemes, the Edwards and the community formed the Moss Side People's Association and a Housing Action Group, intent upon gaining a voice in plans that impacted their neighbourhood. The organization published the Moss Side News to tell community members about meetings and planned demonstrations. Despite their efforts, locals were forced out and the Edwards' home was finally destroyed in 1974. In 1975, Edwards became a neighborhood social worker for the Moss Side Family Advice Centre, allowing her to join her professional career with her activist causes.

Two years later in 1977, with Kath Locke, she co-founded the Manchester Black Women's Mutual Aid organisation with the aim of providing educational support to local children. The group met on Sundays and hosted conferences and meetings for parents to discuss issues their children were having in their schools. They arranged for members to assist parents in meetings with teachers and school officials and attend City Council Education Department functions. Out of these efforts, Edwards and other women, established the Roots Festival in 1977, an annual event celebrating African-Caribbean culture and educating children about their heritage. Because of the disapproval of their husbands and the tendency of men to take over leadership roles in women's groups, early organisations failed and were replaced with women-run, autonomous groups which allowed women to take leadership roles.

When the Mutual Aid group and the Manchester Black Women's Co-operative, which had been founded in 1975 by Locke and her sisters Coca Clarke and Ada Phillips, among other activists like Olive Morris, failed Edwards and Locke, along with others, founded the Abasindi Cooperative in 1980. The organisation was a self-help women's group and aimed to help women improve their lives by networking with other women role models. Because of a lack of awareness of other women's groups at the time, Abasindi distanced itself from mainstream feminists who had no understanding of the poverty and racism experienced by the Moss Side Community. To combat the issues in their community, Edwards and Abasindi members campaigned against racism in schools and ran a supplementary Saturday school tutoring program. Rampant unemployment led Abasindi to establish skills-training and secretarial workshops to help workers find jobs. They even temporarily served as a hospital when needed, treating people injured in riots or protest, such as the 1981 Moss Side riot. After the riots, she became one of the founding members, along with Louise Da-Cocodia and others, in the creation of the Arawak Housing Association, which in 1994, joined with the Walton Housing Association to form the Arawak Walton Housing Association. The purpose of the organisation was to assist in the development of quality housing to meet the needs of the Moss Side community.

In 1984, Edwards spearheaded the organisation of what would become the Manchester Sickle Cell & Thalassaemia Centre through her work at the Moss Side Family Advice Centre. Recognising the lack of information available and understanding of sickle cell disease in the community, the centre brought public health officials together to study the number of community members impacted by the disease, the services they needed, and whether providers were able to service these needs. Raising funds through local businesses, the research they financed found large numbers of persons with sickle cell disease in Greater Manchester, as well as a high incidence of Thalassemia. The centre taught the community about the disease and also worked to provide counselling and referral services. In 1991, it changed its name when funding was permanently provided by the Manchester Health Authority. Edwards was one of the founders in 1986, of Cariocca Enterprises Manchester Limited, an organisation created to expand entrepreneurial opportunities in the inner-city. In 1988, she began an archival project, the Roots Family History Project (also known as the Roots Oral History Project), to collect the stories of British migrants. She managed the project until 2012, when she donated the material she had collected to the Ahmed Iqbal Ullah Race Relations Resource Centre.

In 1989, Phil Thomas, a psychiatrist working at Saint Mary's Hospital for the Manchester Royal Infirmary was invited by Edwards and the other founders of CHEL to serve on the steering committee of the African Caribbean Mental Health Project. Thomas conducted research into the Black people confined in mental institutions and confirmed the disproportionate misdiagnoses and number of confinements. The organization continued to provide educational information and support to families, but also secured government funding to enable the appointment of staff in hospitals, home care, community clinics and secure facilities to support African and Caribbean people and families on mental health services. In 1990, Edwards became the chair of the NIA Center in Hulme, now the Niamos Center, which served as an Afro-centric arts and cultural hub, promoting dance, drama, and music.

Having been involved in the activities of over thirty-five service organizations including the African Caribbean Care Group for the Elderly & Infirm, Black People in the Criminal Justice System, the Family Advice & Community Resource Centre, and the Mosscare Housing Association, among many others, in 1994, she was honoured as a Member of the British Empire for her dedication to community activism and service. She was also awarded an honorary Master of Arts degree from the University of Manchester, and was granted an honorary chieftainship for her community work by the Nigerian Community of Manchester. Edwards retired in 1998, Berry died in 2003, and in 2017, she returned to live in Guyana. In 2019, she returned to Manchester and was treated at the Manchester Royal Infirmary for cancer.

== Death and legacy ==
Edwards died on 22 January 2021 in Georgetown and a celebratory wake was held to honour her at the Manchester Cathedral on 5 March 2021. A plaque commemorating the founders, including Edwards, of the Arawak Walton Housing Association was unveiled at their foundation headquarters in 2013. The Elouise Edwards Photograph Collection and her papers are housed at the Ahmed Iqbal Ullah Race Relations Resource Centre in Manchester.
