= State of Emergency (Steel Pulse album) =

Studio album by Steel Pulse
- Released: June 13, 1988
- Genre: Reggae
- Length: 44:59
- Label: MCA
- Producers: Steel Pulse; Godwin Logie

Steel Pulse chronology
| Babylon the Bandit (1985) | State of Emergency (1988) | Victims (1991) |

Professional ratings
Review scores
| Source | Rating |
|---|---|
| AllMusic | 1.5/5 stars |
| Robert Christgau | C+ |

State of Emergency is the seventh studio album by reggae band Steel Pulse. It was released in June 1988 via MCA Records. The recording sessions took place in the United Kingdom. The album was produced by Steel Pulse and Godwin Logie. The album debuted at number 177 on the Billboard 200 albums chart in the US.

== Track listing ==
| No. | Title | Writer(s) | Length |
|---|---|---|---|
| 1. | "State of Emergency" | David Hinds | 4:36 |
| 2. | "Dead End Circuit" | Hinds | 4:51 |
| 3. | "Steal a Kiss" | Hinds | 4:24 |
| 4. | "Hijacking" | Hinds | 4:31 |
| 5. | "P.U.S.H." | Hinds | 4:50 |
| 6. | "Love This Reggae Music" | Selwyn Brown | 4:25 |
| 7. | "Said You Was an Angel" | Hinds | 3:59 |
| 8. | "Reaching Out" | Alphonso Martin | 5:37 |
| 9. | "Melting Pot" | Brown | 4:21 |
| 10. | "Disco Drop Out" | Hinds | 3:54 |
| 11. | "Reaching Out (Extended Version)" (remixed by Timmy Regisford) | Martin | 8:21 |
| Total length: | | | 44:59 |

== Charts ==
| Chart (1988) | Peak position |
|---|---|
| US Billboard 200 | 177 |
