= White Riot (film) =

British documentary film

White Riot is a documentary film directed by Rubika Shah and produced by Ed Gibbs about the Rock Against Racism movement in late-1970s Britain. Using archival footage, photography and contemporary interviews, the film traces the campaign’s development from its founding in 1976 to the Rock Against Racism carnival held in London’s Victoria Park in 1978.

The film premiered at the 2019 BFI London Film Festival, where it won the Grierson Award for Best Documentary, and later screened at the 70th Berlin International Film Festival, receiving a Special Mention in the Berlinale Documentary Award. It was nominated for Best Documentary at the BIFA Awards.

== Synopsis ==
White Riot documents the formation of Rock Against Racism, a grassroots campaign founded in 1976 in response to racism and the rise of far-right political groups in Britain. Through archival footage, animation and interviews with musicians, organisers and journalists, the film examines how concerts, fanzines and demonstrations were organised to oppose racism and fascism.

The narrative culminates in the Rock Against Racism carnival held in Victoria Park, London, in April 1978, which featured performances by The Clash, Steel Pulse, Tom Robinson Band and X-Ray Spex.

== Production ==
The film was directed by Rubika Shah and produced by Ed Gibbs, who also co-wrote the screenplay. It combines archival materials—including press clippings, photographs and fanzines—with newly recorded interviews and animation to recreate the political and cultural climate of late-1970s Britain.

Shah and Gibbs conducted interviews with musicians and organisers associated with Rock Against Racism, as well as journalists and photographers who documented the movement. Shah has described the film as an attempt to explore how music and youth culture intersected with anti-racist activism in Britain.

== Release ==
The film premiered at the 2019 BFI London Film Festival. It had its international premiere at the 70th Berlin International Film Festival in 2020.

Following its festival run, the film was released theatrically in the UK and overseas cinemas. This was interrupted by the COVID-19 pandemic. It was later broadcast on Sky Arts and made available on digital platforms including Amazon Prime Video and Apple TV.

In North America, the film was acquired for distribution by Film Movement.

== Reception ==
White Riot received generally positive reviews.

Peter Bradshaw of The Guardian wrote that the documentary delivered “rebellion and tough truths” about music and politics. In Little White Lies, Adam Woodward described the film as a vivid chronicle of anti-racist activism in British music culture.

Linda Marric in NME said that the documentary captured “passion, protest and punk politics”, while Arwa Haider writing for BBC Culture noted its contemporary relevance and parallels with modern political debates.

The film was also reviewed in The Times, Time Out, by Glenn Kenny for The New York Times, by David Fear for Rolling Stone,and by Stephen Dalton for The Hollywood Reporter.

== Awards and nominations ==
- Grierson Award for Best Documentary — BFI London Film Festival (2019)
- Special Mention, Berlinale Documentary Award — Berlin International Film Festival (2020)
- Nominated for Best Documentary — British Independent Film Awards (BIFAs)

== Legacy ==
The film has been cited by critics as contributing to renewed interest in the Rock Against Racism movement and its role in British cultural and political history.

It screened at Salisbury Cathedral in 2026 as part of their Joy Noise programme.
