= Babylon the Bandit =

Studio album by Steel Pulse
- Released: 1986
- Recorded: 1985
- Genre: Reggae
- Length: 40:00
- Label: Elektra
- Producer: Jimmy "Senyan" Haynes

Steel Pulse chronology
Earth Crisis (1984)	Babylon the Bandit (1986)	State of Emergency (1988)

Babylon the Bandit is an album by the reggae band Steel Pulse, released in 1986. It won the Grammy Award for Best Reggae Album, becoming the first album by a non-Jamaican artist to win the award, a distinction it held until the American reggae band SOJA won in 2022 for Beauty in the Silence.

== Production ==
The album was produced by Jimmy "Senyan" Haynes.

== Critical reception ==
Professional ratings
Review scores
Source	Rating
AllMusic	3/5 stars
The Encyclopedia of Popular Music	2/5 stars
The Rolling Stone Album Guide	2.5/5 stars
Sounds	3.5/5 stars

Andy Hurt of Sounds said, "Would electro have taken the form it has if Soul Sonic Force hadn't lifted Kraftwerk's Trans Europe Express beat for beat? Ironically, it appears that Steel Pulse have themselves not exactly remained untainted by Babylon, keeping abreast of the latest technological gimmickry and mellowing/commercialising their sound considerably. This is essentially a mood disco record to a residual reggae beat, and what's so wrong with that?" The Providence Journal thought that "while exploring weighty themes, Steel Pulse never becomes shrill or ponderous and the album is smartly leavened with catchy, fun songs about school boy crushes, gold-digging women, and the ups and downs of love."

Mark Moses of High Fidelity said, "With Babylon the Bandit, the group backs some of its sanest arguments with its most propulsive arrangements. Exposing reggae to fresh idioms and fresh wisdom, they force it to survive —to toughen, even —in a place where both the music and its audience are unwanted." Donald McRae of NME wrote, "The real disappointment of Babylon the Bandit is that the admirable sentiments and the more militant assertions are blunted by musical mediocrity ... by Steel Pulse's reliance on DMX/Emulator/fairlight gadgetry and by their apparent admiration for a very Babylonian rock guitar sound." The Omaha World-Herald opined that "the songs, overall, have a very calm, almost benign feel, with very simple love songs seeming to dominate over songs about saving culture in history and music."

Trouser Press wrote that "it was clear that the band’s professed ideals were no longer jibing with their attempts to crack the (American) market ... Protest lyrics swathed in slick, upwardly mobile production were pretty hard to take seriously." Rick Henderson of AllMusic stated, "Fans shouldn't hesitate, but newcomers might want to start with True Democracy and then explore the three Mango albums before trying this one."

== Track listing ==
1. "Save Black Music" – 4:17
2. "Not King James Version" – 4:13
3. "School Boy's Crush (Jail Bait)" – 4:18
4. "Sugar Daddy" – 4:35
5. "Kick That Habit" – 3:42
6. "Blessed Is the Man" – 4:25
7. "Love Walks Out" – 4:26
8. "Don't Be Afraid" – 4:56
9. "Babylon the Bandit" – 5:08

== Charts ==
Chart	Peak position
New Zealand Pop Albums	35
