= Karl Pitterson =

Jamaician record producer

Karl Pitterson is a Jamaican record producer and sound engineer.

Pitterson began his career in the early 1970s as house engineer with Jamaican studios such as Dynamics, Federal, Randy's, Studio One, Treasure Isle and Aquarius. Over the course of his 30 plus year career he has worked with the following artists among others: Bob Marley and The Wailers, Peter Tosh, Bunny Wailer, Burning Spear, Steel Pulse, Aswad, Big Youth, Dennis Alcapone, Pablo Moses, Mighty Diamonds, Sly & Robbie, Jacob Miller, Toots & the Maytals, Barrington Levy, Rico Rodriguez and Augustus Pablo. He has recently produced an album with American reggae artist Bernie Larsen on Love + Trust.

Karl Pitterson produced the following albums for Steel Pulse: Handsworth Revolution (1978), Tribute to the Martyrs (1979) and True Democracy (1982).
