= Red Saunders =

Red Saunders may refer to:

- Red Saunders (musician) (1912–1981), American jazz drummer and bandleader
- Red Saunders (photographer) (born 1945), British photographer and a founder of Rock Against Racism

== See also ==
- Pterocarpus santalinus, common name red saunders
