= Tribute to the Martyrs =

Studio album by Steel Pulse
- Released: July 1979
- Recorded: 1978–1979
- Genre: Reggae
- Length: 43:08
- Label: Mango; Island
- Producer: Karl Pitterson

Steel Pulse chronology
Handsworth Revolution (1978)	Tribute to the Martyrs (1979)	Caught You (1980)

Professional ratings
Review scores
Source	Rating
AllMusic	3/5 stars
Christgau's Record Guide	A−
The Rolling Stone Album Guide	3.5/5 stars

Tribute to the Martyrs is the second studio album by the English reggae band Steel Pulse, released in July 1979. The album peaked at No. 36 on the Swedish Pop Album charts and No. 42 on the UK Pop Album charts.

== Songs ==
"Biko's Kindred Lament" is a tribute to the South African anti-apartheid activist Steve Biko. "Jah Pickney – R.A.R." is about Rock Against Racism.

== Track listing ==
All songs written by David Hinds, except where noted.

1. "Unseen Guest" 5:40
2. "Sound System" 3:15
3. "Jah Pickney – R.A.R." 4:10
4. "Tribute to the Martyrs" 6:40
5. "Babylon Makes the Rules" (Selwyn Brown) 4:20
6. "Uncle George" 4:40
7. "Biko's Kindred Lament" 5:00
8. "Blasphemy (Selah)" 7:00

== Personnel ==
Steel Pulse

with:

- Godfrey Maduro - saxophone
- Dick "Dickage" Cuthell - flugelhorn, cornet
- Rico - trombone
- Satch Dixon

Technical

- Godwin Logie - engineer
- Pete King - executive producer, management
- Jene Hawkins - cover illustration
