= Misty in Roots =

Misty In Roots
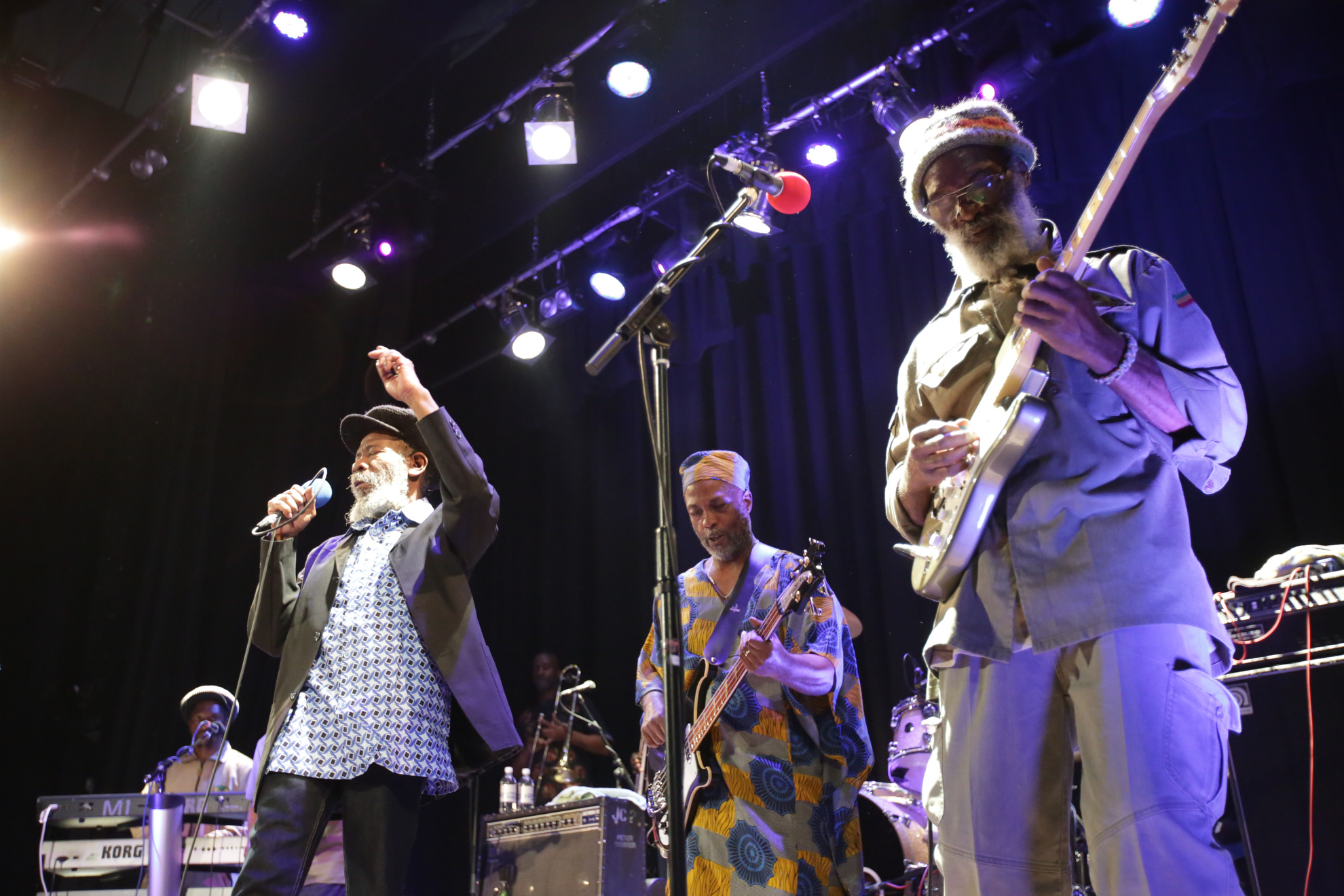
- Misty in Roots performing at Islington Assembly Hall in London on 13 April 2017

Background information
- Genres: Reggae
- Years active: 1975–present
- Website: www.mistyinroots.ws

Misty in Roots are a British roots reggae band formed in Southall, London, in the mid 1970s. Their first album was 1979's Live at the Counter Eurovision, a record full of Rastafarian songs. The Counter Eurovision, held in Brussels, was organised as an alternative to the cheesy and conservative pop of the established Eurovision proper – a 'bread and circuses’ extravaganza in the eyes of many on the left. The album was championed by BBC Radio 1 DJ John Peel, helping to bring roots reggae to a white audience. At this early stage, the band was a collective with five lead singers and various musicians, though by the time of the second album proper the band had slimmed down to just three members. Along with Steel Pulse, Aswad, Matumbi, Cimarons and Black Slate, Misty in Roots were one of the most popular British reggae bands of the late 1970s.

Rolling members of the group include Delbert McKay (Lead Vocalist), Lawrence “Kaziwai” Walford, Walford Tyson (Trumpet), Devin Tyson (Vocals), Winston Rose (Saxophone), Barry Prince (Acoustic Drums), Julian “Bumpy” Peters (Acoustic Drums), Anthony “Tsungirai” Henry (Bass Guitar), Delford “Tawanda” Briscoe (Keyboard), Desmond Charles (Organ), Joseph Brown Munya (Acoustic Drums), Joseph “Tunga” Charley, Chelsey Samson (Lead Guitar), Dennis “Chop Chop” Augustine, and Nii Noi Nortey (Keys and instrumentalist).

Following their debut, Misty in Roots released four studio albums through the 1980s. The band had two BBC Radio 1 "In Concert" appearances in 1983 and 1985. They were invited to play in Zimbabwe in 1982 in recognition of their support for the independence movement, and were the first reggae band to tour South Africa, Poland, and Russia. After a break from recording in the next decade the band returned with a new mini-album Roots Controller in 2002. and continued to play concerts as recently as 2014.

Misty in Roots supported Rock Against Racism, playing several gigs to raise money for anti-fascist causes. In 1979 Clarence Baker, a member of the collective, was beaten in the head by a member of the London Metropolitan Police during a protest in Southall against a National Front meeting, and fell into a coma. The punk band The Ruts, who were partners of the same collective, and had their debut single released by the People Unite co-operative, honoured him in their song "Jah War" which was released as a single and on their album The Crack the same year.

== Discography ==
=== Studio and live albums ===
- Live at the Counter Eurovision 79 (1979) [recorded live in Belgium] - (People Unite)
- Misty Over Sweden (1979) [Swedish release - recorded live in Sweden] - (Nacksving)
- Wise and Foolish (1981) - (People Unite)
- Earth (1983) - (People Unite)
- Musi-O-Tunya (1985) - (People Unite)
- Forward (1989) - (Kaz Records)
- The John Peel Sessions (1995) [New tracks plus new versions of previously released material] - (Strange Fruit)
- Roots Controller (2002) [Six new tracks plus previously released material] - (Real World Records, Virgin)

=== Compilation albums ===
- Chronicles - The Best of' Misty In Roots (1994) - (Kaz Records)
- Jah Sees Jah Knows (1997) [Two CD version includes bonus CD of Live at the Counter Eurovision '79] - (Recall 2cd, owned by Snapper Music)

=== Singles and EPs ===
- "Six One Penny" (1978) - (People Unite)
- "Oh Wicked Man" (1978) - (People Unite)
- "See Them Ah Come" / "How Long Jah" (1979) - (People Unite)
- "Six One Penny" / "Oh Wicked Man" (1979) - (Nacksving)
- "Richman" / "Salvation" (1979) - (People Unite)
- "Zapatta" (1980) - (People Unite)
- "Wandering Wanderer" / "Cry Out For Peace" (1981) - (People Unite)
- "Peace And Love" / "Bail Out" (1981) - (People Unite)
- "Jah Jah Bless Africa" (1981) - (People Unite)
- "Poor And Needy" / "Follow Fashion" (1983) - (People Unite)
- "Poor And Needy" / "Persecution" (1985) - (Tonpress)
- "Own Them Control Them" (1986) - (People Unite)
- "Together" (1988) - (People Unite)
- "The Midas Touch" (1989) - (Kaz Records)
