= To be announced =

Placeholder terms in event planning

To be announced (TBA) is a placeholder term used very broadly in event planning to indicate that although something is scheduled or expected to happen, a particular aspect of it remains to be fixed or set. Other versions of the term include to be confirmed (TBC) and to be determined, discussed, defined, decided, declared, or done (TBD).

== TBA versus TBC versus TBD ==
These phrases are similar, but may be used for different degrees of indeterminacy:

- To be announced (TBA) or to be declared (TBD) – details may have been determined, but are not yet ready to be announced.
- To be confirmed (TBC), to be resolved (TBR), or to be provided (TBP) – details may have been determined and possibly announced, but are still subject to change prior to being finalized.
- To be arranged, to be agreed (TBA), to be determined (TBD) or to be decided – the appropriateness, feasibility, location, etc. of a given event has not been decided.

Other similar phrases sometimes used to convey the same meaning, and using the same abbreviations, include "to be ascertained", "to be arranged", "to be adjudicated", and "to be done".

Use of the abbreviation "TBA" is formally reported in a reference work at least as early as 1955, and "TBD" is similarly reported as early as 1967.

== Examples ==
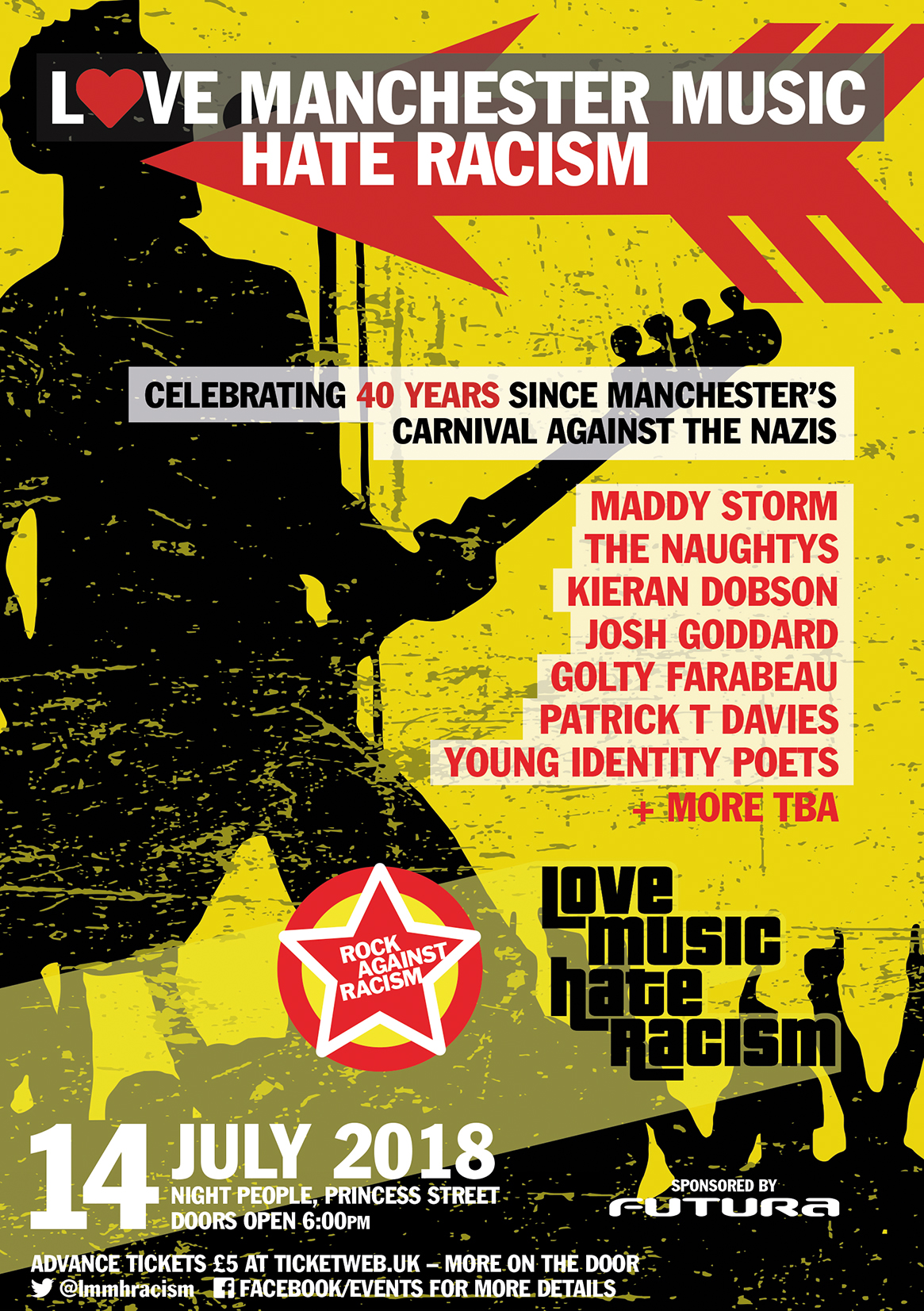
Rock Against Racism Northern Carnival flyer with a list of acts ending with "+ more TBA"

These various placeholder terms are often used to indicate to the public that a vacant position in a lineup of speakers, musicians, or other performers remains to be filled. The terms also frequently indicate that a creative work, such as an album or film, is forthcoming but that the date of release is not yet known. If the forthcoming project is not yet named, these placeholders may be used to indicate that the name has not yet been selected, although the project may also be designated as "untitled" pending that determination.

The terms are also used in sports schedules, particularly where one team has locked in a position in a playoff schedule, but its opponent cannot yet be determined because several teams may qualify for the spot depending on their remaining wins or losses for the season, or because other teams have not yet competed in playoff games that will determine who will face the locked-in team. (Note: See, for example, Indianapolis Monthly: Issues 5–9, vol. 32, 2008 stating: "INDIANAPOLIS COLTS It's playoff time. Can the Colts pick off their rivals one by one, or will they fall victim to last year's heartbreaking turn of events? Ticket prices and opponents TBD.") In government and business, the terms may be used to indicate that a vacant organizational position is expected to be filled, or conversely that a particular individual will be employed in an as-yet-uncreated position.

In program guide listings, both paper and electronic, the term indicates that the program to be aired by a television station or channel will be announced in the near future, a last-second decision to remove a program or film where the content to be aired in its place cannot be updated on short notice by the listings provider, or that a program's airing (or delay to another time) depends on the continuation of a sports playoff series, which usually applies between the fifth and seventh matches or games of a best-of-seven series.

The age rating system of the British Board of Film Classification (BBFC) requires the use of "tbc" (meaning "to be classified") for products that have been submitted to the BBFC and are awaiting final rating.

== Investment type ==
"TBA" (meaning "to be announced") is also used to describe a specific type of simple mortgage investment, the forward mortgage-backed security. This is used to indicate that the investor is acquiring some portion of a pending pool of as-yet unspecified mortgages, which will be specified at a given delivery date. This usage has existed at least since the 1980s. (Note: See Securities Regulation & Law Report. Vol. 16. Bureau of National Affairs. 1984. p. 1765, noting that "[t]he transactions in question at FCA were TBA (to be announced) Ginnie Mae forward contracts...")

== See also ==
- A. N. Other, sometimes ANO, Ann Other
- Nomen nescio or NN
- n/a
- To be continued
