= Rock Against Racism Northern Carnival =

1978 music concert in Manchester, England

The Rock Against Racism Northern Carnival was a free music concert and march held on 15 July 1978; the concert taking place in Alexandra Park, Manchester. Jointly organised by Rock Against Racism and the Anti-Nazi League, the concert was preceded by a march through Manchester, starting at Strangeways on Bury New Road, at 12 noon. The concert featured Steel Pulse, Buzzcocks, Exodus and China Street – and was attended by around 40,000 people.

The concert was conceived by Bernie Wilcox of Rock Against Racism and Geoff Brown of the Anti-Nazi League in April 1978, as they travelled back from Carnival Against the Nazis, which was held in London’s Victoria Park on 30 April 1978. The pair, inspired by the event, wanted to create a similar concert in the northwest.

The event was organised within just ten weeks. For the stage, fencing, sound and generators Bernie and Geoff asked for expert help from Chris Hewitt who organised the Deeply Vale Festivals and who had already provided sound for various Rock Against Racism / Anti-Nazi League indoor events.

Using the stage, generators and PA equipment from the Deeply Vale Festival 1978 (which ran 5 days later near Bury) helped to make the carnival viable both financially and logistically. Deeply Vale also staged a Rock Against Racism day in conjunction with Bernie Wilcox as part of its July 1978 Festival.

Graham Parker and the Rumour approached Rock Against Racism, asking to play a practice set prior to supporting Bob Dylan's first UK concert since the Isle of Wight Festival in 1969 at Blackbushe Aerodrome (by coincidence, Bob Dylan and Graham Parker and the Rumour were playing on the same date as the Rock Against Racism Northern Carnival). With the permission of Manchester City Council, the practice session, which became a Rock Against Racism event, took place on the Thursday before the Rock Against Racism Northern Carnival on the Saturday.

Another Rock Against Racism concert was organised to take place on the Friday evening before the Rock Against Racism Northern Carnival, this time featuring the Rich Kids and The Fall, at UMIST Students' Union.

Rumours that the concert’s date was chosen to coincide with the Moss Side by-election of 13 July 1978 were untrue as the organisers were unaware of this when the concert’s date was set. Alexandra Park was chosen because of its location in the centre of Manchester’s black community and because of its beautiful tree-surrounded oval that was perfect for an outdoor concert.

In 2021 a set of unseen photographs of the Northern Carnival by photographer Thomas Blower were uncovered by The British Culture Archive and later published in the Manchester Evening News.

== 40th anniversary commemoration ==
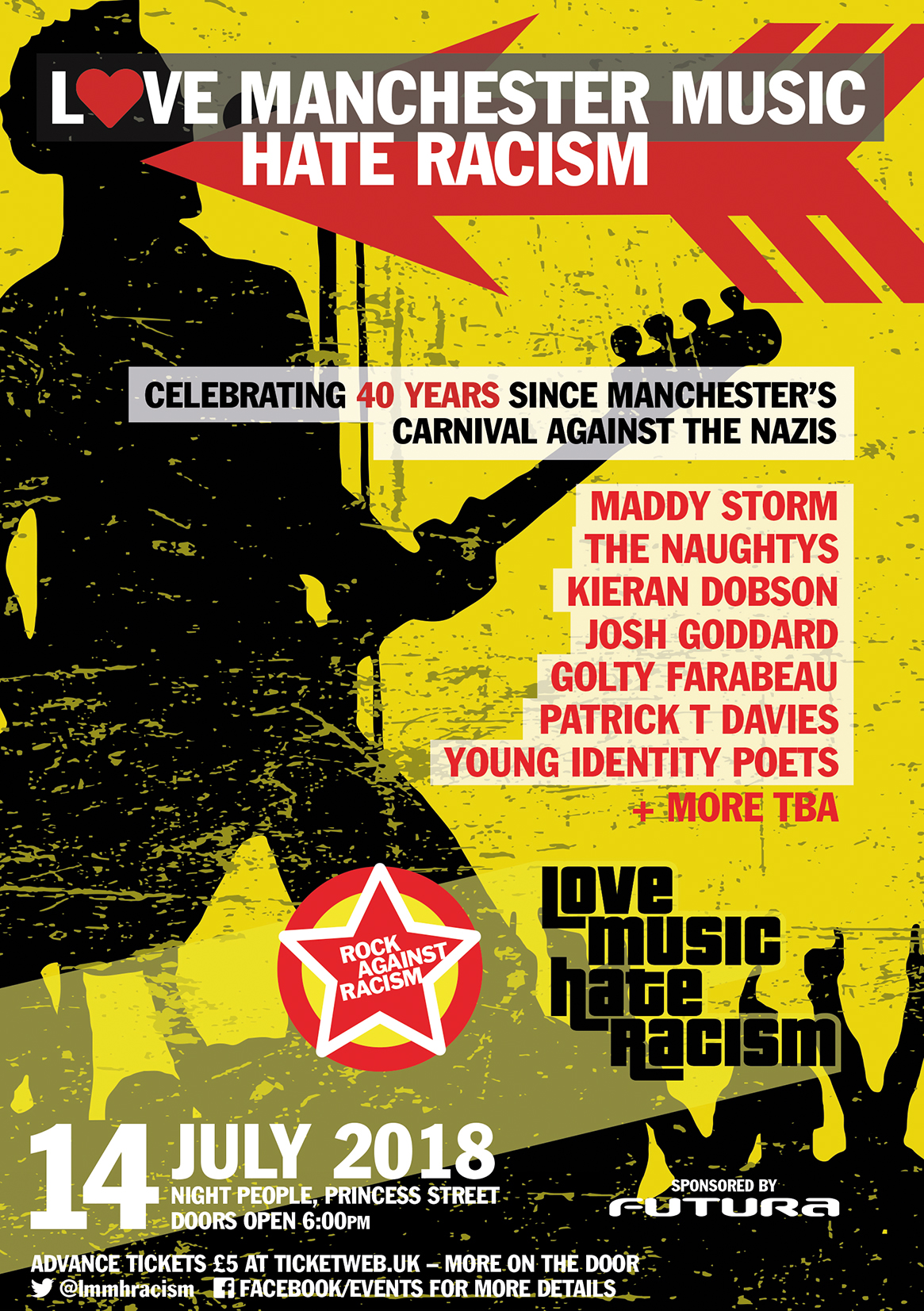
40th Anniversary flyer (front)

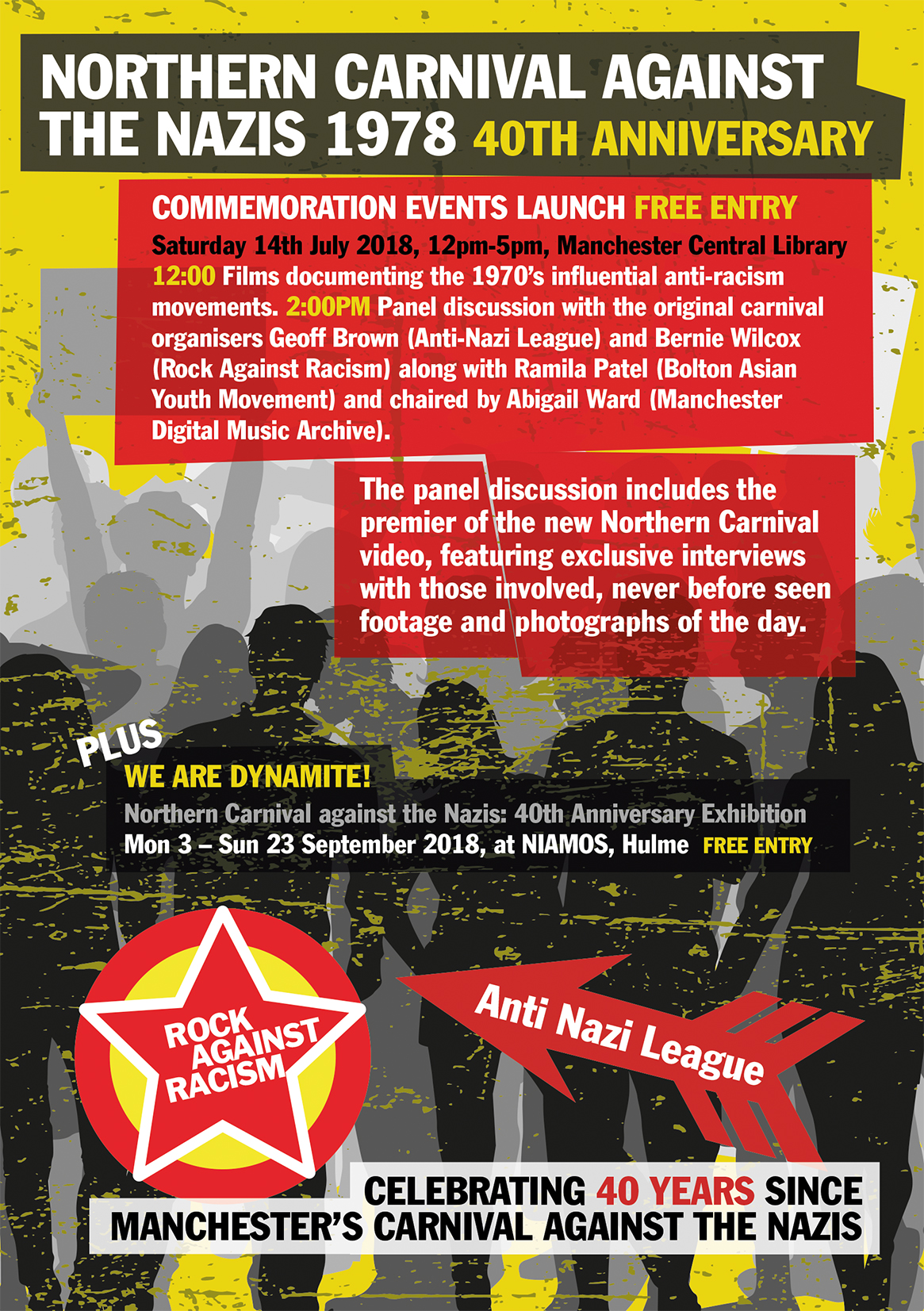
(reverse side)

In 2018, to mark 40 years since the Rock Against Racism Northern Carnival, the event’s original organisers Bernie Wilcox and Geoff Brown worked with a team within Manchester led by Abigail Ward of the Manchester Digital Music Archive – and sponsored by The Heritage National Lottery Fund and Futura Rec2Rec – to arrange a series of commemoration events. These included a commemoration launch at Manchester Central Library on Saturday 14 July 2018, from 12:00 noon until 5:00pm. The event showed films of the 1970’s anti-racist movement, and included a panel discussion with the original organisers, Bernie Wilcox and Geoff Brown. It showcased the first screening of a new Northern Carnival video – 'The Day It Became Cool to be Anti-Racist' – which featured interviews with those involved and never before seen footage and photographs of the day. An exhibition, We Are Dynamite, ran between Monday 3 – Sunday 23 September 2018, at NIAMOS, Hulme. A live gig, featuring several bands and performers – including Maddy Storm, The Naughtys, Kieran Dobson, Josh Goodard, Golty Farabeau, Patrick T Davis and Young Identity Poets – took place at Night People, Princess Street, Manchester on 14 July 2018.
