= British Culture Archive =

Photography organisation

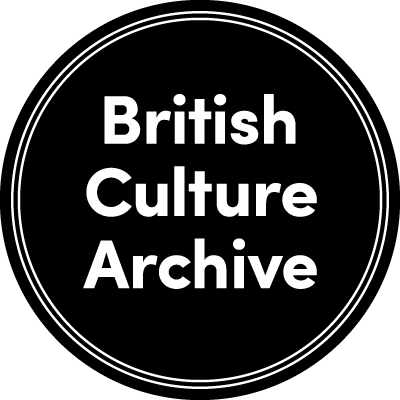
- Website type: Documentary photography
- Founded: 2017
- Headquarters: Manchester, UK
- Country of origin: UK
- Founder: Paul Wright
- Website: www.britishculturearchive.co.uk

The British Culture Archive is a non-profit organisation and publisher of British documentary photography. Its archive, online galleries and exhibitions have a strong emphasis on 20th-century social documentary photography and images of cultural importance. In 2021 the organisation set up BCA21 which highlights 21st Century documentary photography. BCA has exhibited in London, Manchester and Berlin. Its People's Archive offshoot crowdsources images of everyday life in Britain from the 1930s to 2000.

== Details ==
The British Culture Archive was founded by Paul Wright in 2017. It was established to ensure that photographs capturing the social fabric of the UK—often overlooked by traditional institutions—are preserved and accessible to future generations. It highlights images from both professional and amateur photographers, emphasising themes of community, resilience, and cultural identity, with a focus on working-class history and British subculture and fashions of the 20th century.

== Collections and Themes ==
The archive’s extensive collection covers a diverse range of subjects, including:

Working-Class Life – Documentary Photography from working-class communities and industrial landscapes across the UK.

Youth Subcultures – The rise of punk, mod, skinhead, rave, and other youth culture movements that shaped British identity.

Social Change – Documenting shifts in society, from post-industrial decline to political protests.

Regional History – Showcasing communities from London to Glasgow, capturing the unique character of different regions.

== Photographers and Contributions ==
The British Culture Archive showcases work from renowned documentary photographers. Contributors include Peter J Walsh, known for his images of Manchester’s club and rave scene, Peter Mitchell's celebrated colour photography of Leeds, and social documentary photographer Tish Murtha who documented marginalised communities and working class life in Newcastle upon Tyne. The archive also welcomes photography by others whose work documents social change in British society but has not been widely seen. An example of the latter is Heidi Alexander's photographs of Stockport.

== Impact and Legacy ==
The archive has gained recognition for championing British documentary photography and ensuring that ordinary people’s experiences are not forgotten. It has been featured in international publications and continues to grow through its exhibition and publishing programmes, cementing its place as a vital resource for historians, photographers, and cultural enthusiasts.

== Exhibitions ==
- British Culture Archive, The Social, London, November 2019 – January 2020. With work by Tish Murtha and Rob Bremner.
- The People's City, The Refuge, Manchester, January–September 2020. With work by Peter J Walsh and Rob Bremner.
- British Shorts, Sputnik Kino, Kreuzberg, Berlin, January 2020 – January 2021. With work by Tish Murtha and Rob Bremner.
- Use Hearing Protection: the early years of factory records, The Museum of Science and Industry, Manchester. June 2021 - January 2022. With work from Red Saunders, Thomas Blower, Luis Bustamante and The People's Archive.
- A Woman's Work, The Refuge, Manchester, March – June 2022. With work by Tish Murtha and Anne Worthington.
- Together As One, The Refuge, Manchester, July - September 2022. With Work from Peter J Walsh and Jon Shard.
- A Celebration Of Life In The North, 1970s-80s, Bury Art Museum, February - May, 2023. With Work from Luis Bustamante, Don Tonge and Thomas Blower.

== The People's Archive ==
The British Culture Archive crowdfunded its People's Archive offshoot. This was established in 2017 for crowdsourced images of everyday life in Britain from the 1930s to 2000 and the rapid rise of smartphones and social media.
