= Ahmed Iqbal Ullah Race Relations Resource Centre =

Specialist library in Manchester, England

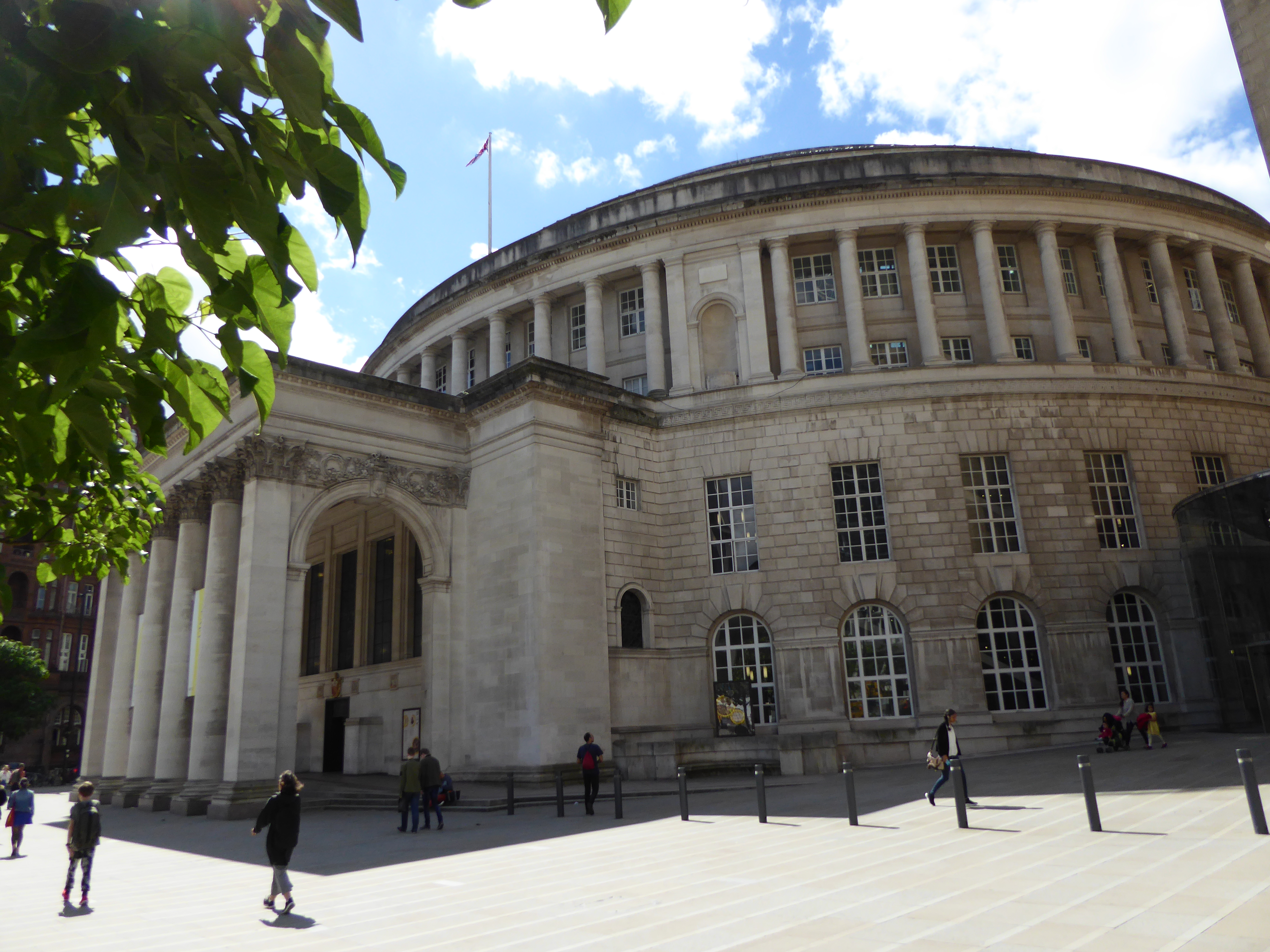
- Resource Centre is based at Manchester Central Library
- Named after: Ahmed Iqbal Ullah
- Formation: 1999; 27 years ago
- Founder: Lou Kushnick OBE
- Type: Lending library
- Purpose: To provide educational resources about race relations and migration
- Location: Manchester, England
- Coordinates: 53.478056°N 2.244722°W
- Leader: Dr Safina Islam
- Parent organization: University of Manchester
- Website: www.racearchive.manchester.ac.uk

The Ahmed Iqbal Ullah Race Relations Resource Centre is "one of Europe's leading specialist libraries on migration, race and ethnicity" open to members of the public, students and researchers. It increases access to and visibility of Black, Asian and Minority Ethnic (BAME) histories with a growing archive of material relating to the local area. Its sister organisation, the Ahmed Iqbal Ullah Education Trust offers advice, training, networking opportunities, project support, exhibitions, publications and events to help community organisations to record and share their heritage. The Centre is part of the University of Manchester and is located in Manchester Central Library, where it is part of the Archives+ partnership. The current head of both the Centre and the Trust is Dr Safina Islam, who was appointed in March 2019.

== History ==
=== Ahmed Iqbal Ullah Race Relations Resource Centre (AIURRRC) ===
The impetus to create the Centre arose from the need to find a home for the increasingly large personal collection of books and other material about race relations which had been collected since the 1960s by Lou Kushnick OBE, then Professor of Sociology (and subsequently Honorary Professorial Fellow in Race Relations) at the University of Manchester. In discussion with colleagues, Kushnick considered donating the material to the University of Manchester Library, but decided he would like it to be readily available to people outside the university as well as to students and researchers, envisaging a collection that would "have huge research value, but also be instrumental in celebrating cultures and combating racism". He approached Professor Martin Harris, then Vice-Chancellor of the University of Manchester, who agreed to provide rent-free space to support the initiative. The centre was established (as the Ahmed Iqbal Ullah Race Relations Archive) in 1999, with Lou Kushnick as its first director. Initially based on the university campus, the Centre had a number of homes, including at the University of Manchester's Sackville Street Building. It moved to its present location in Manchester Central Library when that building reopened following refurbishment in 2014, making access to the Centre by members of the public more readily available than before.

The Centre is named after Ahmed Iqbal Ullah, a 13-year-old pupil of Burnage High School in Manchester, who was murdered in a playground incident in 1986. Ullah's death and the public inquiry into it highlighted deficiencies in UK race relations education of the time. The name was adopted for the Centre because Kushnick "wanted to send a signal" and aimed for the material to be used "in outreach programmes to teachers in schools with limited resources [and] a narrow curriculum [to] encourage an environment where all children could flourish".

The Centre and Trust's former Co-Director, Jacquleine Ould-Okojie retired in August 2018. She had been involved in the Centre since its inception and was previously the organisation's Education Coordinator.

=== Ahmed Iqbal Ullah Education Trust (AIUET) ===
The Ahmed Iqbal Ullah Education Trust (AIUET) is the charitable trust linked to the AIURRRC. It was created in 2001 and is a registered charity governed by a board of trustees. It functions as the outreach arm of the Centre and delivers a wide range of activities and projects that include:

- supporting heritage projects to identify, collect and archive the histories of BAME communities in the region;
- activities across schools to promote knowledge and understanding of black history, citizenship and multicultural issues;
- events and exhibitions that promote knowledge and understanding of black history.

The AIUET receives funding from Manchester City Council and the University of Manchester. The funding is governed by a collaboration agreement between the three parties. AIUET has also been successful in securing National Lottery Heritage Fund (NLHF) grants for community heritage projects. These include:

- Yemeni Roots Salford Lives (2010–2012). A project exploring the history of one of Greater Manchester's oldest communities.
- Legacy of Ahmed (2015–2016). A project exploring the impact of Ahmed's murder, 30 years on. Learning from this project was shared in the published paper Community partnerships and collection development in the Legacy of Ahmed Project
- Coming in From the Cold (2017–2021). A project that supports BAME communities across Greater Manchester to develop and archive their heritage projects. The first phase of this project included an audit of BAME-focused heritage projects and collections in Greater Manchester and a report on the distribution of BAME populations in Greater Manchester.

== Library ==
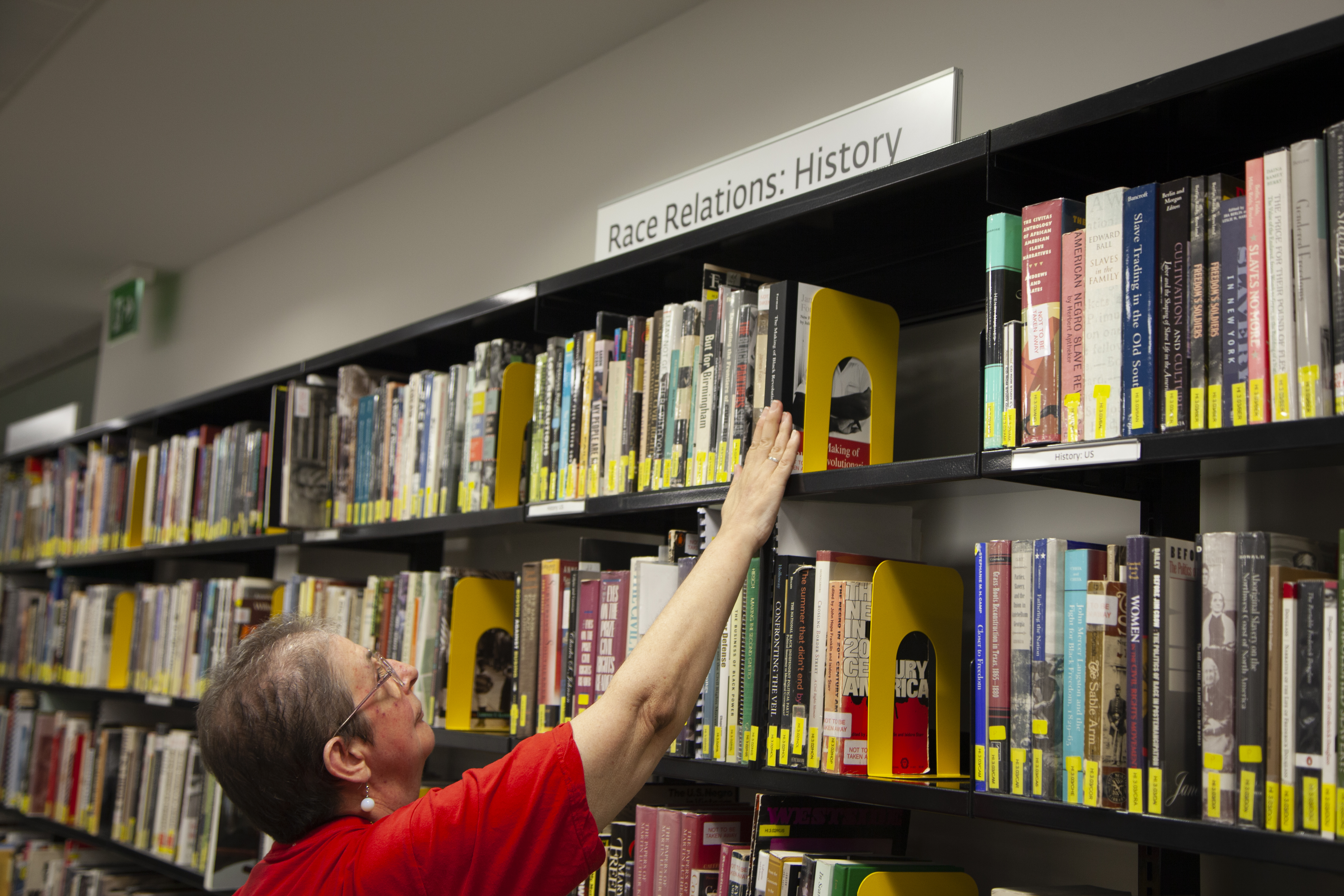
The Ahmed Iqbal Ullah Centre Library

The library has more than 14,780 titles, with subjects ranging from culture, identity, history, politics and local studies. Collections held by the Centre include unique primary resources and extensive secondary resources on the theme of local, national and international race relations and migration. Approximately two-thirds of the library collection is loanable to anyone with a Manchester Libraries card. Reference only material is clearly labelled and can be studied anywhere within the library. Collection highlights include:

- Materials documenting the debates around race and schooling in the UK from the 1960s to the present, as well as teaching materials which are made available to school teachers to enhance their educational activities.
- A wide range of materials relating to the US Civil Rights Movement, including material on the struggle for civil rights stretching from long before the American Civil War to the present day.
- A significant collection of published journals and magazines, including hard-to-find specialist publications.
- The library of the Commission for Racial Equality (CRE) was acquired by the Centre when the CRE closed in 2007, and includes extensive historical material documenting the changing issues around race relations in the UK, such as documents relating to inquiries, and reports published by the CRE, Runnymede Trust and other bodies.

== Archives ==
The Centre is a partner in Archives+ which brings together a number of organisations to provide a holistic range of archive and heritage services from its city centre location in Manchester Central Library. The Centre's Archives include books as well as magazines, reports, posters, photographs, oral histories, personal and organisational papers and ephemera. Highlights are:

- Steve Cohen collection. Cohen was a Manchester-based lawyer and campaigner who helped found the Law Centre in Longsight, Manchester, and the Greater Manchester Immigration Aid Unit. The collection includes publications, newspaper cuttings, banners, posters, badges and t-shirts from more than 70 anti-deportation campaigns fought in Manchester between the 1970s and 1990s.
- Roots Oral History Project. Life story interviews were carried out with members of Manchester's African and Caribbean communities in the 1980s and 1990s; this collection includes audio recordings and transcripts from 26 interviews.
- Ann Adeyemi collection. Documents the life of Adeyemi, a Manchester woman of Irish and Liberian heritage whose mixed-race mother was born in Salford, Greater Manchester, in 1920. The collection includes photographs and other ephemera as well as a recorded interview.
- The Hulme Study. A large collection of material documenting plans to regenerate the Hulme area of Manchester in the 1990s.
- Controversial Material. This collection which includes important material relating to fascism and racism shows the history of changing ideas and attitudes around race in the UK.
- Race Relations in the UK. An increasingly large collection of documents, publications and ephemera which reveals the history of race relations in the UK since 1950. Including the full official archives of the Institute of Race Relations.
- Pan-African Congress 1945 and 1995 Archive. The collection holds material in relation to the Pan-African Congress. It spans from 1945-2005 and includes leaflets, invites, photographs, press releases, letters and programme of events
- Northern Carnival Against the Nazi's collection. This collection of five posters and four badges taken from the Rock Against Racism Northern Carnival held on 15 July 1978 in Alexandra Park, Manchester.
- Manchester Bangladeshi Women's Organisation Ananna Papers. The Manchester Bangladeshi Women's Project was established to meet the specific needs of Bangladeshi women in the Manchester community. This collection contains paper material consisting of governance, administrative and promotional material of Ananna.

== Publications ==
The first book published by the Education Trust was A Long Way From Home. It features stories, poetry and mini biographies narrated by young refugees and was published in 2002 in association with Save the Children. The Trust has since published a range of books for children as well as teaching resources for schools. These include:

- Folk tales written and illustrated by children.
- Biographies of Black British heroes, including:
  - Olaudah Equiano
  - Noor Inayat Khan
  - Samuel Coleridge-Taylor
  - Mary Prince
- Personal testimonies and local history, including:
  - Sister Rosetta Tharpe's 1964 performance on a disused railway station platform in South Manchester
- Teaching resources to support multicultural education.

== Other activities ==
With the Education Trust, the Centre holds, participates in and supports a range of activities, including theatrical, musical and literary events. It is particularly active during the annual Black History Month.

== See also ==
- The University of Manchester
- Campaign for Racial Equality
- Manchester Central Library
