= Kath Locke =

Manchester community leader and activist

Kath Locke (1928–1992) was a mixed-race Catholic British community leader and political activist based in Manchester. Active in Moss Side community politics, she helped to establish the George Jackson House for homeless children in 1973. In 1980, Kath Locke was a co-founder of the Abasindi Co-operative, a community organisation run by Black women. During the 1980s, the Abasindi Co-operative was a hub for many educational and cultural programs for the local African and Afro-Caribbean community, operating out of the Moss Side People's Centre. The 1995 documentary film We Are Born to Survive tells the story of Kath Locke's political life. The Kath Locke Centre in Moss Side is named after her.

== Early life and family ==
Kath Locke was born in Manchester in 1928, the daughter of an English mother from Lancashire and a Nigerian seaman. Growing up in Blackpool in the 1930s, she became aware of her mixed-race identity when people refused to believe she was English.

Despite her academic excellence, Locke faced racism from a young age while attending school. Despite passing the 11+ exam, she was denied admission to a grammar school in Blackpool due to her race. Her parents attempted to challenge this decision but encountered a school system lacking in accountability and transparency. Reflecting on these early experiences, Locke later expressed that they fueled her commitment to advocating for social justice, racial equality, and gender equality.

In her early teens, Kath Locke and her family returned to live in Moss Side in Manchester. Her two sisters, Ada Phillips and Coca Clarke, also became community activists.

== Career and community activism ==
Locke became an adult teacher and trainer, and took part in Moss Side community politics. In 1973, she helped establish the George Jackson House for homeless children. She campaigned for awareness of Black history in Manchester, persuading Manchester City Council to commemorate the 1945 Pan-African Congress with a red plaque on the wall of Chorlton Town Hall. Locke was also involved in campaigning against the poll tax and educational material stereotyping black people.

In 1975, Kath Locke and her sisters helped to found the Manchester Black Women's Co-operative (MBWC) in Moss Side. The MBWC focused on training black mothers re-entering the workforce, equipping them with essential office skills. The organisation was co-located with the George Jackson House Trust, which shared some of its state funding with the MBWC. On 26 October 1979, Locke and others staged an occupation at the community centre when it emerged that Ron Phillips was attempting to relocate the MBWC, after trying to re-direct some of the co-operative's funds and interfering with day-to-day management.

=== Abasindi Cooperative ===
On 1 January 1980, Kath Locke and Elouise Edwards, together with many others, founded the Abasindi Co-operative, a self-help women's organisation for Black women in Manchester. It replaced its predecessor, the MBWC, and was completely autonomous from the trust. The new name was based on a Zulu word meaning "survivor." The founders of Abasindi wrote that the co-operative should be "clearly autonomous and self-determining" and that "Black women need to organise projects staffed and controlled by women."

The Abasindi Co-operative grew quickly and within five years, it operated many projects out of the Moss Side People's Centre. The projects included a drop-in centre for the elderly and a community health centre addressing issues such as sickle cell anaemia. The Co-operative also offered a Saturday school focusing on science, English, maths and Black history, to address educational underachievement and high youth unemployment.

Members of the Abasindi Co-operative were also very active in political campaigning around issues such as immigration law. During the 1981 Moss Side riot, Abasindi was involved in supporting local residents, setting up a makeshift hospital.

The co-operative became a hub of Afro-Caribbean cultural activities. A performing arts organisation, ACULT, the Abasindi Cultural Theatre Workshop, was established dedicated to dancing, singing, playwriting and poetry. In addition, it offered a summer school focusing on cultural activities such as dance, drama, music, and arts and crafts.

=== Oral histories ===
Another project run by the Co-operative was the Roots History Project, a collection of oral histories about the Black community in Manchester. Kath Locke presented a paper on "Views of Black Women" together with Maria Noble at the first History Workshop held in Salford.

== Film and legacy ==
Locke retired in 1991 from her job as development officer for educational projects for the North West District Workers' Association.

An interview of Locke by Paul Okojie formed the basis of a 1995 documentary film, We Are Born to Survive, about her political life.

After her death in 1992, the Kath Locke Community Health and Resource Centre was renamed in her honour. The Kath Locke Centre has played an important role in the regeneration of the Moss Side estate, and was recognised with a Best Practice Award from the British Urban Regeneration Association in 1999.
