= Rock Against Sexism =

Activist group in the UK and US

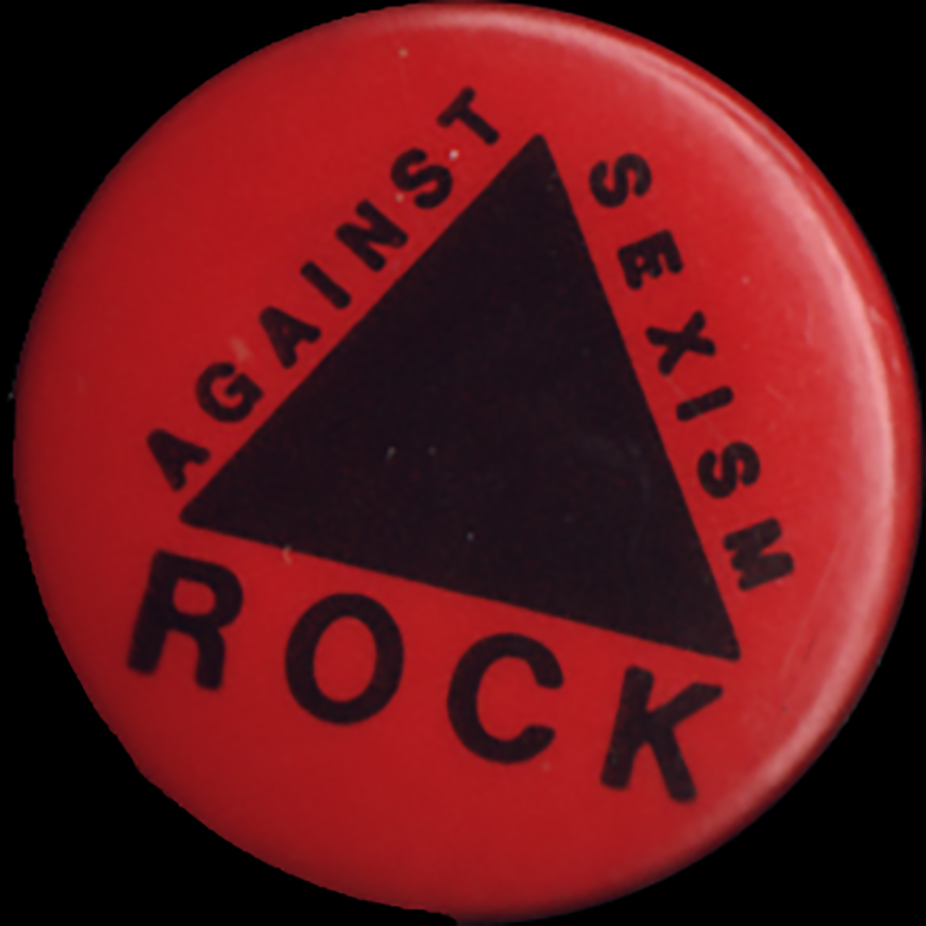
- Rock Against Sexism badge made by RAS Boston - 1980s
- Genre: Punk rock, protest art, etc.
- Locations: UK, North America
- Years active: 1978–

Rock Against Sexism (RAS) was a political and cultural movement dedicated to promoting women in music, and challenging sexism in the rock music community, pop culture and in the world at large. It was primarily a part of the punk rock music and arts scene.

RAS began in the UK in 1978, and by the mid-1980s also had a presence in North America. It was strongly inspired and influenced by Rock Against Racism and the two movements had many of the same participants.

In the UK, it began amid controversy when rock and reggae shows hired bands that some participants in the scene felt were misogynist, and amid growing complaints that women musicians were expected to "flaunt their bodies, both in performances and adverts". This resulted in community discussions of sexism in music and art, which were not always taken seriously by the established music press. However, prominent Rock Against Racism organizers saw RAS as a "sister-organisation" and the two groups supported each other.

In the US, Rock Against Sexism, centered in Boston, was an activist group of "artists, musicians, and others who sought to fight sexism and heterosexism in rock culture by promoting women musicians and alternatives to mainstream rock music." They sponsored local punk shows and radio shows, published a zine, organized protests and marched together as a contingent in larger events such as Boston and New York City gay pride. The group hosted a monthly dance party at a local gay bar and benefits for the HIV/AIDS activist group ACT UP.

== Legacy ==
Rock Against Sexism, in both the UK and US, promoted punk rock, performance art, art installations, and other community events by women and members of the LGBT community. In the US, the Boston chapter held music workshops for women wanting to learn to play and start bands; "RAS prefigured the riot grrrl movement, giving women more access to punk subculture." Both movements challenged heterosexism, homophobia, sexism and elitism, while confronting stereotypes of women and LGBT people.

== See also ==
- Punk ideology
- Queercore
- Women in punk rock
- Women in rock
- Women Who Rock: Making Scenes, Building Communities Oral History Archive

=== Related lists ===
- Lists of women in music
- List of punk rock festivals
- List of historic rock festivals
- List of heavy metal festivals
