= Lou Kushnick =

Sociologist (1938–2025)

Lou Kushnick OBE
- Born: Louis Kushnick; 1938; Brooklyn, New York
- Died: September 2025 (aged 86–87)
- Education: Columbia University; Yale University
- Occupations: Academic, teacher, author, researcher
- Years active: 1964-96
- Employer: University of Manchester
- Known for: Academic teaching and research in race relations, poverty, race and economics.

Lou Kushnick OBE (1938–2025) was a sociologist and expert in comparative race relations in the US and UK.

Born to a Jewish family in New York, Kushnick studied at the universities of Columbia and Yale before relocating from the US to Manchster,UK in the early 1960s. He was Professor of Sociology at The University of Manchester for over 40 years. As a teacher he contributed to the university's growing American Studies programme.

As an author he produced the widely read 'Race, Class & Struggle: Essays on Racism and Inequality in Britain, the US and Western Europe'. His research interests centred on race relations and intersections with class, religion and poverty. Library archives hold his work including 95 interviews with key figures in American politics, race, health and welfare history in the 1980s and 1990s, including James and Grace Lee Boggs, and Mel King. He was vice-chair of the UK Institute of Race Relations from 1978 to 1998, and a regular contributor to its journal, Race & Class.

Kushnik was the founder of the specialist library Ahmed Iqbal Ullah race relations resource centre located in Manchester's Central Library, which includes archives documenting the histories of Greater Manchester’s communities and struggles against racism. The collection includes Professor Kushnick's own papers and archives.

According to the University of Manchester, his vision for the centre was of a collection that would have research value and also help celebrate Global Majority histories and combat racism.

Kushnick became Honorary Professorial Fellow in Race Relations at Manchester University and was awarded an OBE in 2008 for services to the community and to Higher Education. A memorial lecture series has been established in his honour.
