= African Holocaust (album) =

Studio album by Steel Pulse
- Released: July 14, 2004
- Recorded: The Dub Factory, Birmingham, England
- Genre: Reggae
- Length: 56:37
- Label: RAS
- Producers: Michael Henry, Steel Pulse

Steel Pulse chronology
Rage and Fury (1997)	African Holocaust (2004)

African Holocaust is the eleventh reggae studio album released by Steel Pulse in July 2004. African Holocaust was Grammy nominated in the category of Best Reggae Album. The album peaked at No. 9 on the Billboard Top Reggae Album charts.

== Background ==
The album features an ample guest list headlined by fellow reggae acts Damian "Junior Gong" Marley and Capleton. In this album Steel Pulse, with David Hinds' signature voice leading the way, ventures further away from the dancehall persuasions apparent in their late-1980s and early-'90s work.

The song "Born Fe Rebel" appears on the soundtrack of the 2004 video game Tony Hawk's Underground 2. The band released a music video in 2007 for the song "Door Of No Return" which was shot between Senegal and New York City. The video was produced by Driftwood Pictures Ltd.

== Critical reception ==
Professional ratings
Review scores
Source	Rating
AllMusic	3.5/5 stars

Jason Birchmeier of AllMusic said that African Holocaust is "very well done contemporary reggae". Simon Coates of the BBC also praised the album. He exclaimed "Slightly over-polished in parts, African Holocaust is nonetheless the sound of a band pulling out all the stops to regain their position as the UK's number one roots collective." Brent Hagerman of Exclaim! declared, "African Holocaust delivers gritty lyrics, heady roots reggae, and contemporary nuances to create an album long-time fans will rejoice in and others should discover."

=== Accolades ===
African Holocaust was Grammy nominated in the category of Best Reggae Album.

== Track listing ==
All songs written by David Hinds, except "George Jackson" (Bob Dylan) and "Darker Than Blue" (Curtis Mayfield)

1. "Global Warning" – 4:52
2. "Blazing Fire" (feat. Capleton) – 3:36
3. "There Must Be a Way" – 4:14
4. "Make Us a Nation" – 4:16
5. "Dem a Wolf" – 3:36
6. "No More Weapons" (feat. Damian "Junior Gong" Marley) – 4:36
7. "Tyrant" – 4:51
8. "Door of No Return" – 4:49
9. "Born fe Rebel" – 4:41
10. "Darker Than Blue" – 4:34
11. "George Jackson" – 3:56
12. "African Holocaust" (feat. Tiken Jah Fakoly) – 4:24
13. "Uncle George" – 4:12
