= Vex (album) =

Studio album by Steel Pulse
- Released: 1994
- Studios: Grove, Ocho Rios, Jamaica
- Genre: Reggae
- Length: 60:35
- Label: MCA
- Producers: Steel Pulse, Stephen Stewart

Steel Pulse chronology
Victims (1991)	Vex (1994)	Rage and Fury (1997)

Vex is an album by the English reggae band Steel Pulse, released in 1994. The album peaked at No. 7 on the Billboard Top Reggae Albums chart. The band promoted the album with a North American tour.

== Production ==
The album was produced by the band and Stephen Stewart. The band added dancehall sounds to its traditional reggae. "New World Order" criticizes the Clinton administration. "No Justice, No Peace" was inspired by the 1992 Los Angeles riots. Tony Rebel contributed to "Bootstraps".

== Critical reception ==
Professional ratings
Review scores
Source	Rating
AllMusic	3/5 stars
The Indianapolis Star	3/4 stars

The Edmonton Journal noted the "gentler ... smoothed-out sound." The Chicago Tribune deemed the album "equal parts love songs and personal, social and political manifestos," writing that "luckily, even the topical material is eminently groovable." The Gazette wrote that "lead vocalist David Hinds has one of the most expressive reggae voices around and his band is as tight as a fist." The Indianapolis Star stated that "Vex finds Steel Pulse succeeding in delivering tough messages in an accessible musical framework."

== Track listing ==
1. "Bootstraps" – 4:48
2. "Back to My Roots" – 4:59
3. "Islands Unite" – 4:20
4. "Better Days" – 4:50
5. "In My Life" – 4:36
6. "Endangered Species" – 4:34
7. "New World Order" – 4:30
8. "X Resurrection" – 4:34
9. "Whirlwind Romance" – 4:56
10. "No Justice, No Peace" – 4:43
11. "Dirty H2O" – 4:19
12. "Dub to My Roots" – 4:58
13. "Dubite" – 4:18
