= MSV Housing =

The Mosscare St Vincent's Housing Group, also called MSV, is a social housing provider. It owns and manages almost 9,000 homes in Greater Manchester, Lancashire and West Yorkshire. Charlie Norman is the Chief Executive. In 2024 she was appointed Chair of the Northern Housing Consortium, which represents social landlords operating in the north of England.

In April 2026 it announced a partnership with data analytics specialists Connexica. This will enable them to analyse repairs, income, compliance and customer information.
