= Victims (Steel Pulse album) =

Studio album by Steel Pulse
- Released: 1991
- Studios: The Dub Factory & Central, Birmingham, England
- Genre: Reggae
- Length: 63:25
- Label: MCA
- Producers: Steel Pulse, Paul Horton, Peter Lord, V. Jeffrey Smith, Stephen Bray, Michael Verdick

Steel Pulse chronology
State of Emergency (1988)	Victims (1991)	Vex (1994)

Victims is the eighth album by the band Steel Pulse, released in 1991.

The album rose to the No. 6 spot on the Billboard Top World Music Albums chart. It was nominated for a Grammy in the Best Reggae Album category. The band supported the album with a North American tour.

== Production ==
The album was produced by Steel Pulse, Paul Horton, Peter Lord, V. Jeffrey Smith, Stephen Bray, and Michael Verdick. It was divided into "Westside" and "Eastside" halves. Stevie Wonder played harmonica on "Can't Get You (Out of My System)". "Taxi Driver" is about taxi drivers not stopping for Black customers.

== Critical reception ==
Professional ratings
Review scores
Source	Rating
AllMusic	3/5 stars

The Boston Globe noted that the album "contains searing raps against gang warfare, cultural imperialism and freebasing cocaine." The Los Angeles Times called it "a quirkily inventive outing that manages to coalesce Caribbean, pop, hip-hop, rock, and funk elements while maintaining the integrity of its patented vocal harmonies."

The St. Petersburg Times determined that "Steel Pulse has found a working formula for melding reggae roots with Club-MTV affectations." The Ottawa Citizen opined that "pop and soul inflections dominate, often with reggae stuck in the back pocket."

== Track listing ==
1. "Taxi Driver" – 3:40
2. "Can't Get You (Out of My System)" – 4:06
3. "Soul of My Soul" – 4:20
4. "Grab a Girlfriend" – 4:07
5. "Feel the Passion" – 4:12
6. "Money" – 4:13
7. "Victims" – 4:04
8. "Gang Warfare" – 4:43
9. "To Tutu" – 1:35
10. "Free the Land" – 3:38
11. "We Can Do It" – 4:01
12. "Stay with the Rhythm" – 3:39
13. "Evermore" - 3:28
14. "Dudes" - 3:15
