= Rage and Fury =

Studio album by Steel Pulse
- Released: August 19, 1997
- Recorded: The Dub Factory, Birmingham, England
- Genre: Reggae
- Length: 62:02
- Label: Atlantic
- Producer: Steel Pulse

Steel Pulse chronology
Vex (1991)	Rage and Fury (1997)	African Holocaust (2004)

Rage and Fury is an album by the reggae band Steel Pulse, released in 1997. The album was nominated for a Grammy Award for "Best Reggae Album". Rage and Fury peaked at No. 7 on the Billboard Top Reggae Albums chart.

== Production ==
"Black Enough" is a cover of the Gamble and Huff song.

== Critical reception ==
Professional ratings
Review scores
Source	Rating
AllMusic	4/5 stars

Vibe thought that the album's best songs "lyrically balance sophisticated introspection with youthful rebellion."

== Track listing ==
1. "Emotional Prisoner" – 4:39
2. "Role Model" – 4:24
3. "I Spy... (No Stranger to Danger)" – 4:14
4. "Settle the Score" – 4:33
5. "Brown Eyed Girl" – 3:47
6. "The Real Terrorist" – 4:41
7. "Black and Proud" – 4:35
8. "Ku Klux Klan" – 3:48
9. "House of Love" – 4:21
10. "Blame on Me" – 3:59
11. "Black Enough" – 5:00
12. "Peace Party" – 4:31
13. "Spiritualize It" – 4:49
14. "KKK in the Jungle" – 4:41
