= Steve Nisbett =

- Born: Steve Nisbett; 15 March 1948; Nevis
- Died: 18 January 2018 (aged 69) Birmingham, England
- Genres: Reggae
- Occupation: Drummer

Steve Nisbett (15 March 1948 – 18 January 2018) was a drummer for the reggae group Steel Pulse, from 1977 to 2001.

Stephen Vincent Nisbett was born in Nevis, the eldest of seven children, he left the Caribbean in 1957 at the age of nine to join his parents who had migrated to Saltley, Birmingham, England. He began playing drums and percussion as a teenager, and was a member of various soul bands, such as Penny Black, Rebel, and Roy Gee and the Stax Explosion. He joined Steel Pulse in 1977 before their debut album Handsworth Revolution through to their 1997 release Rage and Fury. Seen as the old man of the group he was the main drummer until 1998 when he gave up the honours to Conrad Kelly, but continued to play percussion. Nisbett retired from the band in 2001 due to health concerns, on good terms.

He latterly lived in Perry Barr, Birmingham, England, and owned his own record company, Grizzly Records.

Nisbett died on 18 January 2018, at the age of 69.
