= Red Saunders (photographer) =

British photographer and director (born 1945)

Red Saunders (born 28 December 1945 in London) is a British photographer and director. Saunders was one of the founders of Rock Against Racism.

== Life ==
Saunders was born in late December 1945 in London. As a young mod in the 1960s he joined the underground theatre group CAST.

From 1963 until 1965 he served a photographic apprenticeship at the ad agencies G.S.Royds and S.H.Bensons as well as the Gilchrist studios, London. He later studied at Polytechnic of Central London and worked for G.S.Royds at the Photo de Seine studio in Paris. Saunders then became assistant for ad photographers Jimmy Wormser and Lou Long. In 1967 he went to the Middle East on behalf of the Bertrand Russell Peace Foundation, documenting the events in the wake of the Six-Day War in Lebanon, Syria, Jordan and Egypt. After a short stint at GM studio Saunders worked for the Sunday Times since 1969.

In the 1970s he focused on assignments for ad clients, editorial jobs and publishers in the UK, Europe and the US. His photographs were used on various album covers for artists like Suzi Quatro, Jean-Michel Jarre, Seething Wells, Benjamin Zephaniah, Billy Connolly, Big Country, Aswad or Yellowman.

In the late 1970s he delivered pictures for publications such as The Sunday Times Magazine, Time Out, Rolling Stone, GQ, Time or Life. Since 1983 he published or co-published several photo books like 24 Hours in the Life of Los Angeles / Olympic City '84 and A Day in the Life of London.

In 1976, Saunders together with Roger Huddle founded Rock Against Racism.

In 1985, he founded Short Circuit Films, where he produced and directed the short film The End, the six part production The Gift for BBC Wales and White Girls on Dope for Channel 4. Glenn Carwithen and Saunders also directed several Autumn Graphics ad spots for Channel 4, which were awarded a Yellow Pencil at the D&AD Awards 1993.

In 1993, Saunders studio and most of his work was destroyed by an arsonist, which led to a three year hiatus. In 1996, he again started to direct ad spots. In 1999 he also returned to photography, focusing on more personal themes and also starting to use digital imaging methods.

Beginning in 2008 Saunders concentrated on his Hidden project, creating large format tableaux vivants ('living pictures') of the age-long fight for democracy and social justice. Saunders aims to reproduce historic scenes but this time showing dissenters, revolutionaries, radicals and non-conformists.

== Publications ==
- Klaus Fabricius, Red Saunders (Hrsg.): 24 Hours in the Life of Los Angeles / Olympic City '84. Alfred van der Marck Editions, New York, 1984, ISBN 9780912383040.
- Red Saunders, Syd Shelton, Malcolm McGregor: A Day in the Life of London. Jonathan Cape Ltd, 1985, 288 pages, ISBN 978-0224029759.
- Red Saunders, Syd Shelton: Ireland: A Week in the Life of a Nation. Ebury Press, 1986, 288 pages, ISBN 9780712695183.
- Roger Huddle, Red Saunders: Reminiscences of RAR: Rocking Against Racism (1976–1982). Redwords, 2016, 256 pages, ISBN 9781910885369.

== Exhibitions ==
- 2000: Nearby. Pentagram Gallery, London.
- 2011: Hidden. Impressions Gallery, Bradford.
