= Rock Against Racism =

Music festival and campaign (1976–1982)

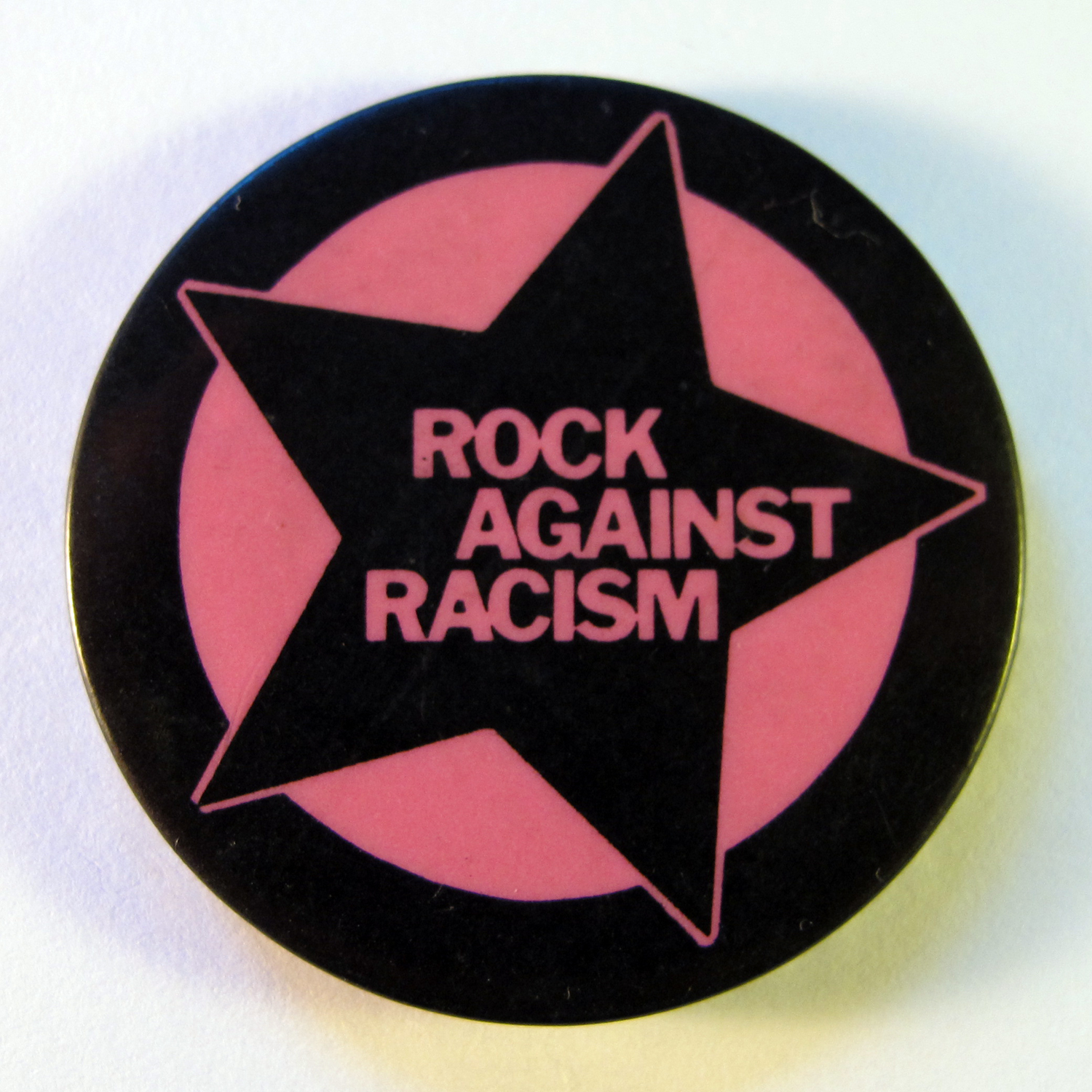
- Genre: Punk, reggae, etc.
- Years active: 1976–1982

Rock Against Racism (RAR) was a political and cultural movement which emerged in 1976 in reaction to a rise in racist attacks on the streets of the United Kingdom and increasing support for the far-right National Front at the ballot box. Between 1976 and 1982, RAR activists organised national carnivals and tours, as well as local gigs and clubs throughout the country. RAR brought together black and white fans in their common love of music, to discourage young people from embracing racism. The musicians came from all pop music genres, something reflected in one of RAR's slogans: "Reggae, soul, rock'n'roll, jazz, funk and punk". The movement was in part founded as a response to statements by rock musicians such as Eric Clapton and David Bowie.

== History ==
Originally conceived as a one-off concert with a message against racism, Rock Against Racism was founded in 1976 by Red Saunders, Roger Huddle, Jo Wreford, Pete Bruno and others. According to Huddle, "it remained just an idea until August 1976"; this was when Eric Clapton made a declaration of support for former Conservative minister Enoch Powell (known for his anti-immigration Rivers of Blood speech) at a concert in Birmingham.

Clapton told the crowd that England had "become overcrowded" and that they should vote for Powell to stop Britain from becoming "a black colony". He also told the audience that Britain should "get the foreigners out, get the wogs out, get the coons out", and then he repeatedly shouted the National Front slogan "Keep Britain White". Saunders, Wreford and Bruno, who were members of the agit-prop theatre group, Kartoon Klowns, together with Huddle, responded by writing a letter to NME expressing their opposition to Clapton's remarks. They believed these were all the more disgusting because he had a hit with a cover of Bob Marley's "I Shot the Sheriff":

When I read about Eric Clapton's Birmingham concert when he urged support for Enoch Powell, I nearly puked. What's going on, Eric? You've got a touch of brain damage. So you're going to stand for MP and you think we're being colonised by black people. Come on... you've been taking too much of that Daily Express stuff, you know you can't handle it. Own up. Half your music is black. You're rock music's biggest colonist. You're a good musician but where would you be without the blues and R&B? You've got to fight the racist poison, otherwise you degenerate into the sewer with the rats and all the money men who ripped off rock culture with their chequebooks and plastic crap. Rock was and still can be a real progressive culture, not a package mail-order stick-on nightmare of mediocre garbage. Keep the faith, black and white unite and fight. We want to organise a rank-and-file movement against the racist poison in rock music – we urge support – all those interested please write to:

ROCK AGAINST RACISM,
Box M, 8 Cotton Gardens, London E2 8DN

P. S. "Who shot the Sheriff", Eric? It sure as hell wasn't you!

At the end of the letter, they called for people to help form a movement called Rock Against Racism, and they received hundreds of eager replies from fans who recognised the hypocrisy and wanted to proclaim the black roots of the music they loved.

Around this time, David Bowie also made inflammatory statements, expressing support for fascism and admiration for Adolf Hitler in interviews with Playboy, NME and a Swedish publication. Bowie was quoted as saying: "I think Britain could benefit from a fascist leader. After all, fascism is really nationalism ... I believe very strongly in fascism, people have always responded with greater efficiency under a regimental leadership." He was also quoted as saying: "Adolf Hitler was one of the first rock stars" and "You've got to have an extreme right front come up and sweep everything off its feet and tidy everything up."

Bowie caused further controversy by allegedly making a Nazi salute while riding in a convertible, although he always strongly denied this, insisting that a photographer simply caught him in the middle of waving. He later expressed regret and shame for these statements, blaming them on a combination of an obsession with occultism and Friedrich Nietzsche, as well as his excessive drug use at the time. He said: "I have made my two or three glib, theatrical observations on English society and the only thing I can now counter with is to state that I am NOT a fascist."

By the 1980s, Bowie's public statements and imagery in his art had shifted towards anti-racism and anti-fascism. In an interview with MTV anchor Mark Goodman in 1983, Bowie aggressively criticised the channel for not providing enough coverage of Black musicians. Bowie described his videos for "China Girl" and "Let's Dance" as "simple" statements against racism, and his album Tin Machine as taking a more direct stance against fascism and neo-Nazism.

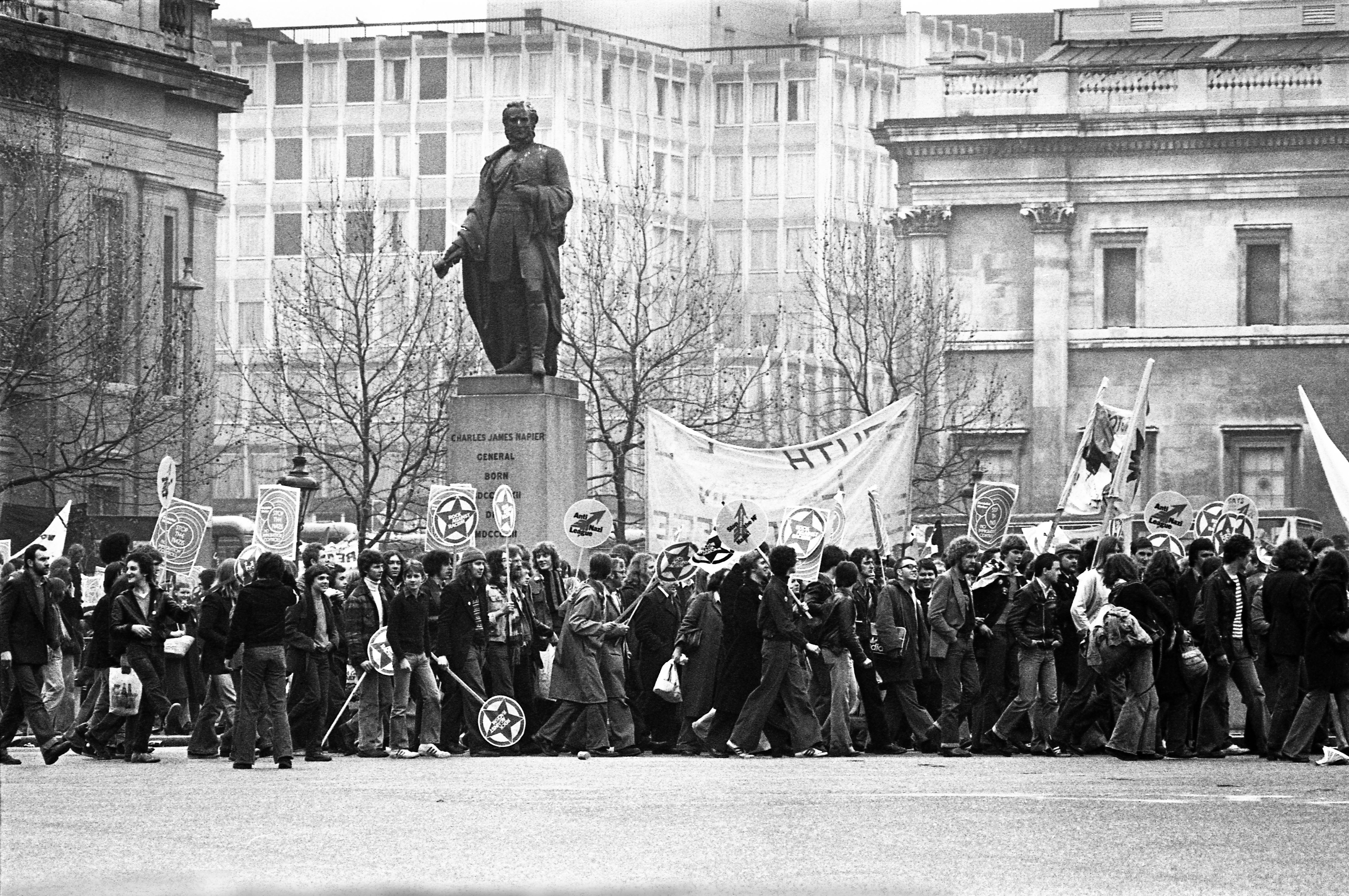
Rock Against Racism march in Trafalgar Square, 1978

The first RAR gig took place at the Princess Alice pub in Forest Gate in London's East End in November 1976; Carol Grimes and Matumbi were the main acts. At the end of the gig the bands took part in a jam, something which was to become a signature of RAR's gigs at a time when it was still rare for black and white musicians to perform together. In the same year RAR launched its revolutionary fanzine, Temporary Hoarding, going on to produce 15 issues over the next five years. By 1977 local RAR groups were springing up all over the country, including in Leeds, Birmingham, Manchester, Hull, Newcastle, Edinburgh, Glasgow, Belfast, Sheffield, Cardiff, Swansea, Bristol, and across London. Eventually there were more than 200 throughout the UK.

Musicians not only played for RAR, many took part in organising gigs and clubs. In Leeds, Gang of Four, the Mekons and Delta 5 were all actively involved in their local RAR group, as were Au Pairs and the Beat in Birmingham, and Misty In Roots and the Ruts in Southall, London. Tom Robinson, who was an early supporter of the movement, played several gigs with his band, TRB, and came occasionally to meetings of the RAR Central Collective.

The Collective – which included writers, graphic artists, photographers, musicians and fans – oversaw RAR's national events and comprised elected representatives: from Temporary Hoarding (Ruth Gregory, David Widgery and Syd Shelton); from RAR central office (Kate Webb, John Dennis and Wayne Minter), as well as Red Saunders and Clarence Baker from Misty in Roots. Other members who regularly participated in meetings included Lucy Whitman (who wrote for Temporary Hoarding as Lucy Toothpaste), Roger Huddle and Robert Galvin.

== International groups ==
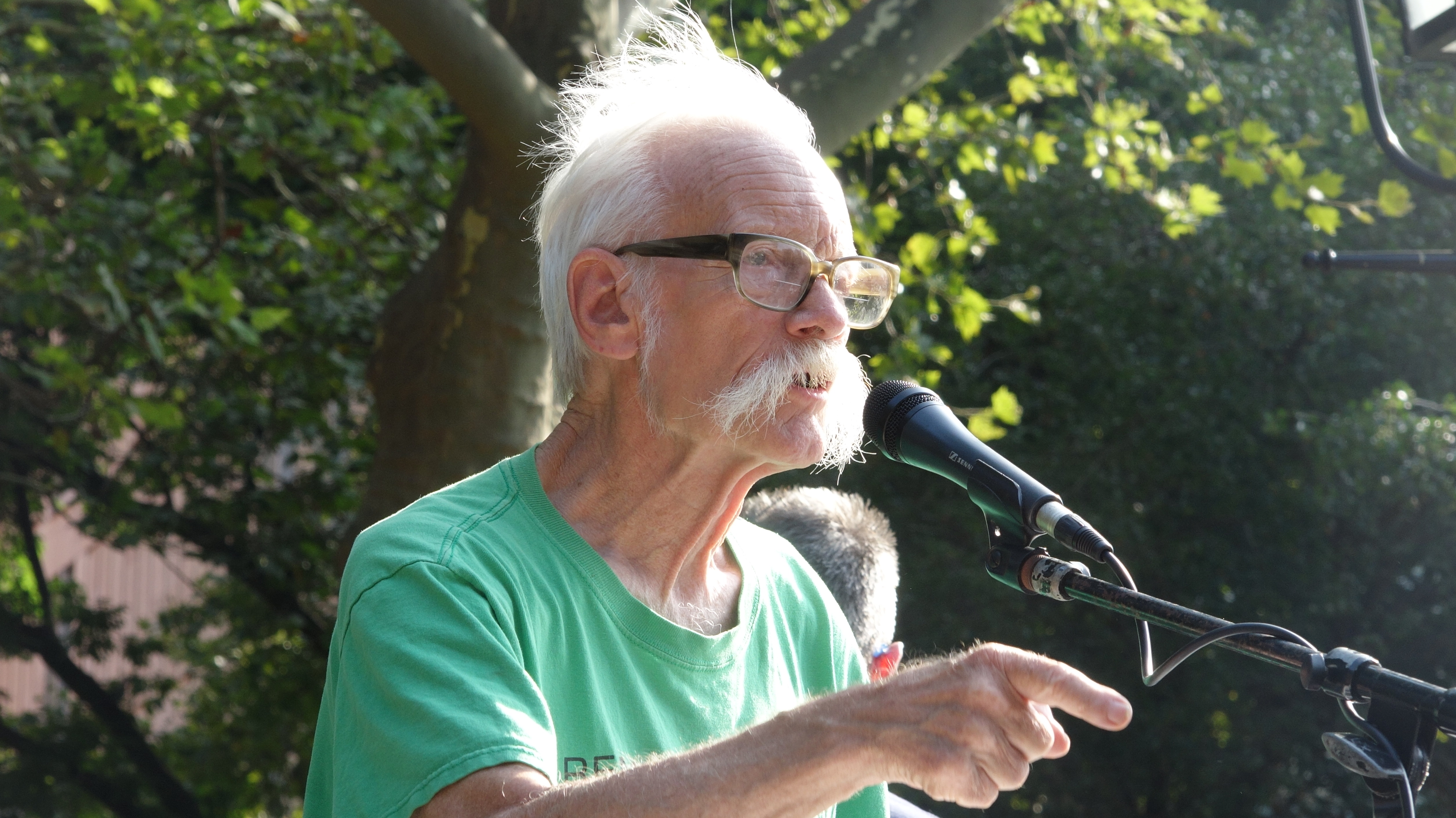
Dana Beal speaking at Rock Against Racism in Washington Square Park in New York City on August 10, 2025.

Across the globe, several RAR groups started in the United States, in New York, San Francisco and Chicago, and also in Ireland, France, Belgium, Sweden, the Netherlands, Germany, Norway, Denmark, South Africa, and Australia.

There was a 1989 US Supreme Court case, Ward v. Rock Against Racism, concerning noise at Rock Against Racism events in New York City.

== Carnivals Against Racism ==
With support for the movement growing, in 1978 RAR organised two national Carnivals in London in conjunction with the Anti-Nazi League (ANL) to counteract the rising number of racist attacks in the UK. These were held in poor but vibrant multi-racial areas. On 30 April 1978, 100,000 people marched six miles from Trafalgar Square to the East End of London (a National Front hotspot), via Cable Street for an open-air concert at Victoria Park in Hackney.

The concert featured the Clash, Steel Pulse, Tom Robinson Band, X-Ray Spex, Jimmy Pursey (from Sham 69), and Patrik Fitzgerald. The Southall-based reggae band Misty In Roots led the parade from the back of a lorry. For the second Carnival, on 24 September, a similar number of people marched from Hyde Park, crossing the Thames until they arrived at Brockwell Park in Brixton for a concert featuring Aswad, Elvis Costello and Stiff Little Fingers.

Further Carnivals were organised by local RAR and ANL groups, often with the help of sympathetic councils and trade unions. The biggest of these, in August, attracted 40,000 to the Northern Carnival in Manchester. There, over a couple of days, Buzzcocks, Steel Pulse, the Fall, Graham Parker and the Rumour, Exodus, and China Street all performed; a week later at the Deeply Vale Festival, a Rock Against Racism day was held. There were also large Carnivals that year in Edinburgh, Cardiff and Brent.

In 1981, Leeds RAR organized the last RAR Carnival at Potternewton Park in Chapeltown. Bands who played included the Specials, Aswad, Au Pairs and Misty in Roots.

== Militant Entertainment ==
In the run-up to the UK general election of 1979, RAR organised the Militant Entertainment Tour which traveled 2000 miles across the country visiting Cambridge, Leicester, Cromer, Coventry, Sheffield, Leeds, Middlesbrough, Lancaster, Edinburgh, Stirling, Aberdeen, Bradford, Liverpool, Manchester, Birmingham, Nottingham, Cardiff, Llanelli, Exeter, Plymouth, Newport, and Bristol. The tour's grand finale was at the Alexandra Palace in North London. Forty bands played on the tour, including: Barry Forde Band, Leyton Buzzards, the Piranhas, Stiff Little Fingers, 15, 6, 17, the Mekons, Carol Grimes, the Band, Alex Harvey, Gang of Four, Angelic Upstarts, Aswad, the Ruts, Crisis, UK Subs, Exodus and John Cooper Clarke.

In 1978 a sister organisation, Rock Against Sexism (RAS) was founded by a group of women concerned about sexism in the music communities. Lucy Toothpaste from RAR became a lead organiser, and the south east London RAR group became an RAS collective. There was significant overlap between the two groups, with the larger, more established RAR sometimes providing security and other assistance at RAS events.

Also in April 1979, a demonstration organised by the Southall Youth Movement against the National Front, who were standing candidates in the upcoming general election, was attacked by the police. This resulted in the death of schoolteacher Blair Peach, and dozens of injuries including the head wounds suffered by Clarence Baker from Misty in Roots, which left him in a coma for several months. RAR quickly organised two benefit concerts at The Rainbow Theatre in North London, called "Southall Kids Are Innocent". The Clash, Pete Townshend of the Who, the Enchanters, the Pop Group, Misty in Roots, Aswad, the Members and the Ruts all performed.

== Legacy ==
Starting in 1979, German anti-fascists used the banner Rock gegen Rechts as the motto of concerts and festivals held irregularly against far-right politics as a form of political demonstration in Germany and Austria.

In 1988, the militant anti-fascist organisation Anti-Fascist Action formed a musical arm, Cable Street Beat (named after the Battle of Cable Street, a 1936 confrontation between fascists and anti-fascists), on similar principles to Rock Against Racism. Cable Street Beat launched a magazine, Cable Street Beat Review, in early 1989. Among the artists who performed for early Cable Street Beat events were Blaggers ITA, Angelic Upstarts, Attila the Stockbroker, the Men They Couldn't Hang, Forgotten Sons, and Blyth Power.

In 2002, some music fans, affiliated with Unite Against Fascism, concerned about a resurgence of nationalist and racist activity in the UK, organised a new group under the name of one of RAR's best-known slogans: "Love Music Hate Racism". They put on a concert at The Astoria in London featuring Mick Jones, Buzzcocks, and the Libertines.

In 2019, White Riot, a documentary about the birth of Rock Against Racism featuring activists and performers from the time, premiered in competition at the BFI London Film Festival. Directed by Rubika Shah and co-written and produced by Ed Gibbs, it won the Best Documentary Prize (Grierson Award) at the festival's closing night awards. It went on to win additional prizes at the Berlin, Krakow and IndieLisboa international film festivals, prior to a general release.

== See also ==
- Arsch huh, Zäng ussenander
- Birlikte
- List of historic rock festivals
- List of punk rock festivals
- Love Music Hate Racism
- Rock Against Communism
- Rock Against Racism Northern Carnival
- Rock Against Sexism
- Rock gegen Rechts
- Stop Murder Music
