= Alphonso Martin =

British musician (born 1956)

Alphonso Martin (born 20 March 1956) is a British musician best known as a percussionist and vocalist for the reggae group Steel Pulse.

He joined Steel Pulse in 1976 as a friend of David Hinds. He played percussion and backup vocals for fifteen years, and also contributed lead vocals on the songs "Shining", "Your House", "Reaching Out", "Soul of My Soul", and "Evermore", until leaving the band in 1991 after the release of Victims to pursue other interests.

He is the father of Shakira Martin, the 2011 Miss Jamaica Universe winner who died aged 30 on 3 August 2016 as a consequence of sickle-cell disease.

He lives in Birmingham.
