= Ronald McQueen =

American musician

Ronald McQueen (also known as "Ponnic McQueen" or "Stepper") is a bass guitarist and one of the original members of the reggae band Steel Pulse.

McQueen is usually credited with naming the band "Steel Pulse" after a successful racehorse. He was the main bass guitarist for their first four albums, but left on good terms before the recording of Pulse's fifth album Earth Crisis.

He currently lives in Laguna Beach, California, and is a member of the band Mongoose.
