= Steel Pulse =

English reggae band

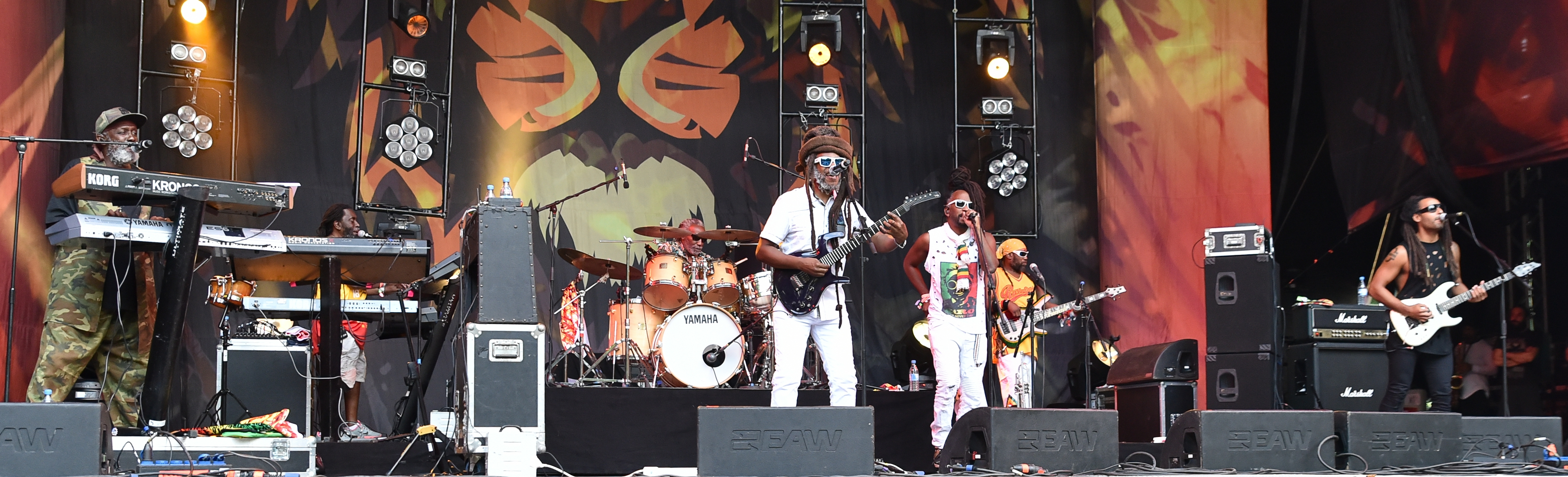
- Steel Pulse in 2017

Background information
- Origin: Birmingham, England
- Genres: Roots reggae
- Years active: 1975–present
- Labels: Island; Mango; Elektra; MCA; Atlantic; RAS
- Members: David Hinds; Selwyn Brown; Sidney Mills; Wayne Clarke; David Elecciri Jr.; Amlak Tafari
- Past members: See former members
- Website: steelpulse.com

Steel Pulse are a British roots reggae band from the Handsworth area of Birmingham, England. They originally formed at Handsworth Wood Boys School, and were composed of David Hinds (lead vocals, guitar), Basil Gabbidon (lead guitar, vocals), and Ronald McQueen (bass); along with Basil's brother Colin briefly on drums and Mykaell Riley (vocals, percussion). Steel Pulse were the first non-Jamaican act to win the Grammy Award for Best Reggae Album, and have gained eight other Grammy nominations.

== History ==
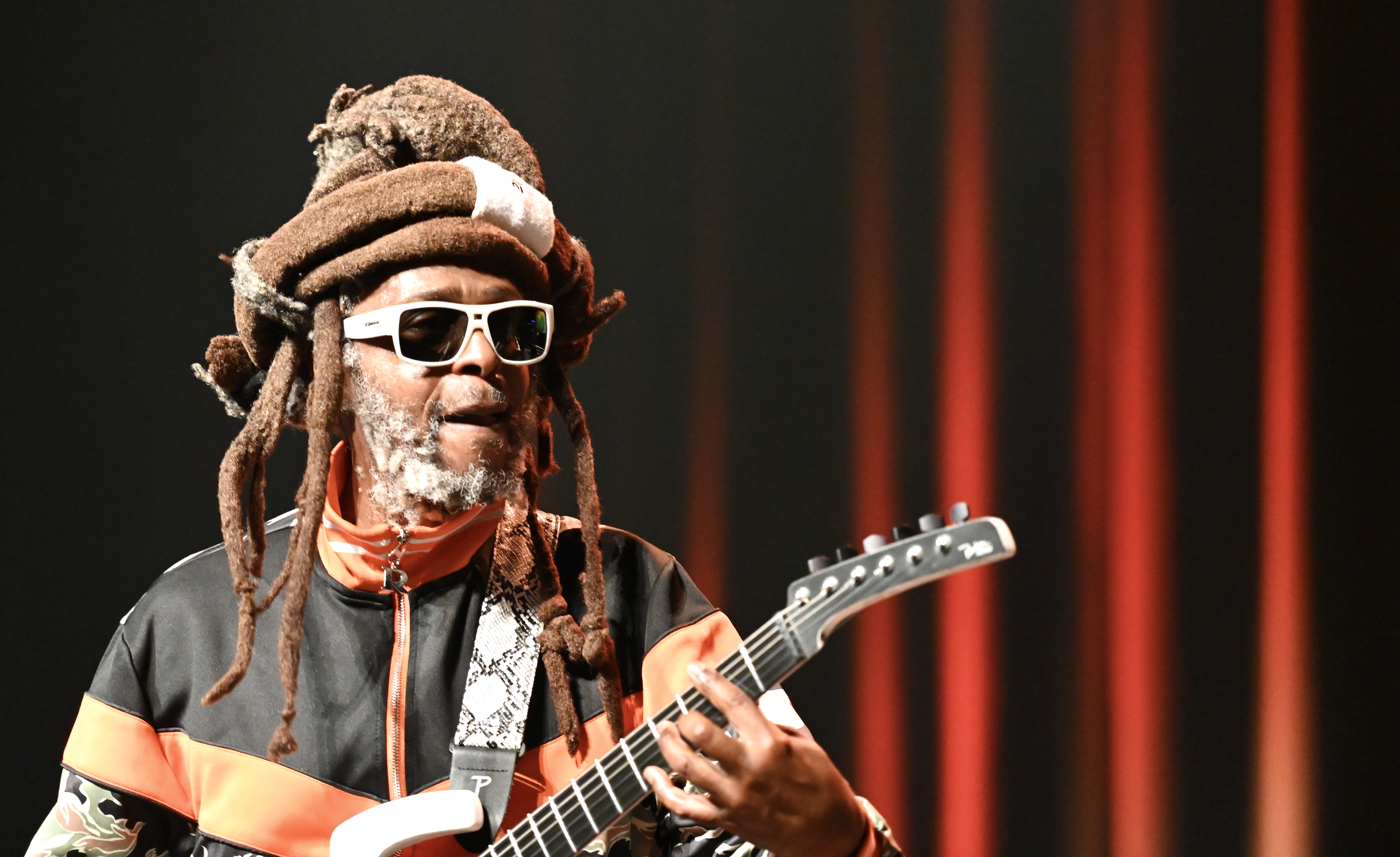
Frontman David Hinds of Steel Pulse in concert in Antwerp, 2022.

Basil Gabbidon and David Hinds became inspired to form Steel Pulse after listening to Bob Marley and the Wailers' Catch a Fire. The band formed in 1975 and their debut single "Kibudu, Mansetta And Abuku" was released via the small independent record label Dip, and was related to the situation of British urban black youth against the imagery of an African homeland. Their next single was "Nyah Luv" on Anchor. Paradoxically Steel Pulse were initially refused live dates in Caribbean venues in Birmingham due to their Rastafarian beliefs. During the popularization of punk rock in the mid-1970s, Steel Pulse began to play punk venues such as the Hope and Anchor in London and The Electric Circus in Manchester in 1976.

Aligning themselves closely with the Rock Against Racism organization, and featuring in its first music festival in early 1978, they chose to tour with sympathetic elements of the punk movement, including the Stranglers and XTC. Eventually they found a more natural environment in supporting Burning Spear, which brought them to the attention of Island Records.

=== Island Records era (1977–1980) ===
Their first single on Island was "Ku Klux Klan", relating to horrors of racism; this track was often accompanied by a visual parody of the sect in live performances; the song was ranked the 460th-greatest song of all time in Rolling Stone's 2020 edition of the 500 Greatest Songs of All Time. By this time the band included Selwyn Brown (keyboards), Steve "Grizzly" Nisbett (drums), Alphonso Martin (vocals, percussion) and Mykaell Riley (vocals). Their debut album, Handsworth Revolution (recorded in 1977 and released in early 1978), was part the evolution of roots reggae outside Jamaica. Despite critical and moderate commercial success covering their first two albums, their relationship with Island Records soured by the advent of their third album, Caught You (released in the US as Reggae Fever).

The band made their US concert debut at the Mudd Club in New York in 1980. Tom Terrell, who would later serve as their manager, was instrumental in masterminding a Steel Pulse concert on the night of Bob Marley's funeral, which was broadcast live around the world from the 9:30 Club, in Washington, D.C., on 21 May 1981.

=== Wise Man Doctrine and Elektra era (1982–1985) ===
In 1982 Steel Pulse formed their own label Wise Man Doctrine Records. They also reached a distribution deal with Elektra Records for the US market. They released True Democracy, distinguished by the Garvey-eulogizing 'Rally Round' cut. A further definitive set arrived in Earth Crisis in 1984. However, Elektra copied Island's approach in trying to steer Steel Pulse towards a pop-reggae stance similar to Eddy Grant. Babylon the Bandit was consequently comprised, although one track "Not King James Version" powerfully took exception to the absence of black people in most versions of the Bible.

They released Babylon The Bandit in 1985, for which the band won a Grammy award.

=== MCA Records era (1988–1997) ===
Their next move was to MCA for State of Emergency (1988), which retained some of the synthesized dance elements of its predecessor.

Rastafari Centennial, Steel Pulse's first live album, was recorded live at the Elysee Montmartre in Paris, over three nights in January 1992, and dedicated to the hundred-year anniversary of the birth of Haile Selassie. It was the first recording after Alphonso Martin left the band, leaving the trio of Hinds, Nisbett and Selwyn. While they still faced criticism at the hands of British reggae fans, in the United States their reputation was growing, becoming the first ever reggae band to appear on The Tonight Show television programme. Their stateside profile got a boost in 1992, as Hinds challenged the New York City Taxi & Limousine Commission in the Supreme Court, asserting that their cab drivers discriminated against black people in general and Rastafarians in particular. The lawsuit was later dropped by Steel Pulse.

In 1989 the group contributed "I Can't Stand it" to the soundtrack of Spike Lee's film Do The Right Thing.

In 1994 the group headlined some of the world's biggest reggae festivals including Reggae Sunsplash USA, Jamaican Sunsplash, Japan Splash and Northern California annual Reggae on the River Festival. In 1986, Steel Pulse contributed a version of "Franklin's Tower" on Pow Wow Records' Fire on the Mountain: Reggae Celebrates the Grateful Dead compilation. They recorded The Police's "Can't Stand Losing You" for a reggae compilation of Police tunes that appeared on the Ark 21 label. Rastanthology, a 17-song collection of Steel Pulse classics, was released on the band's own Wise Man Doctrine label in 1996.

=== Later years (1997–present) ===
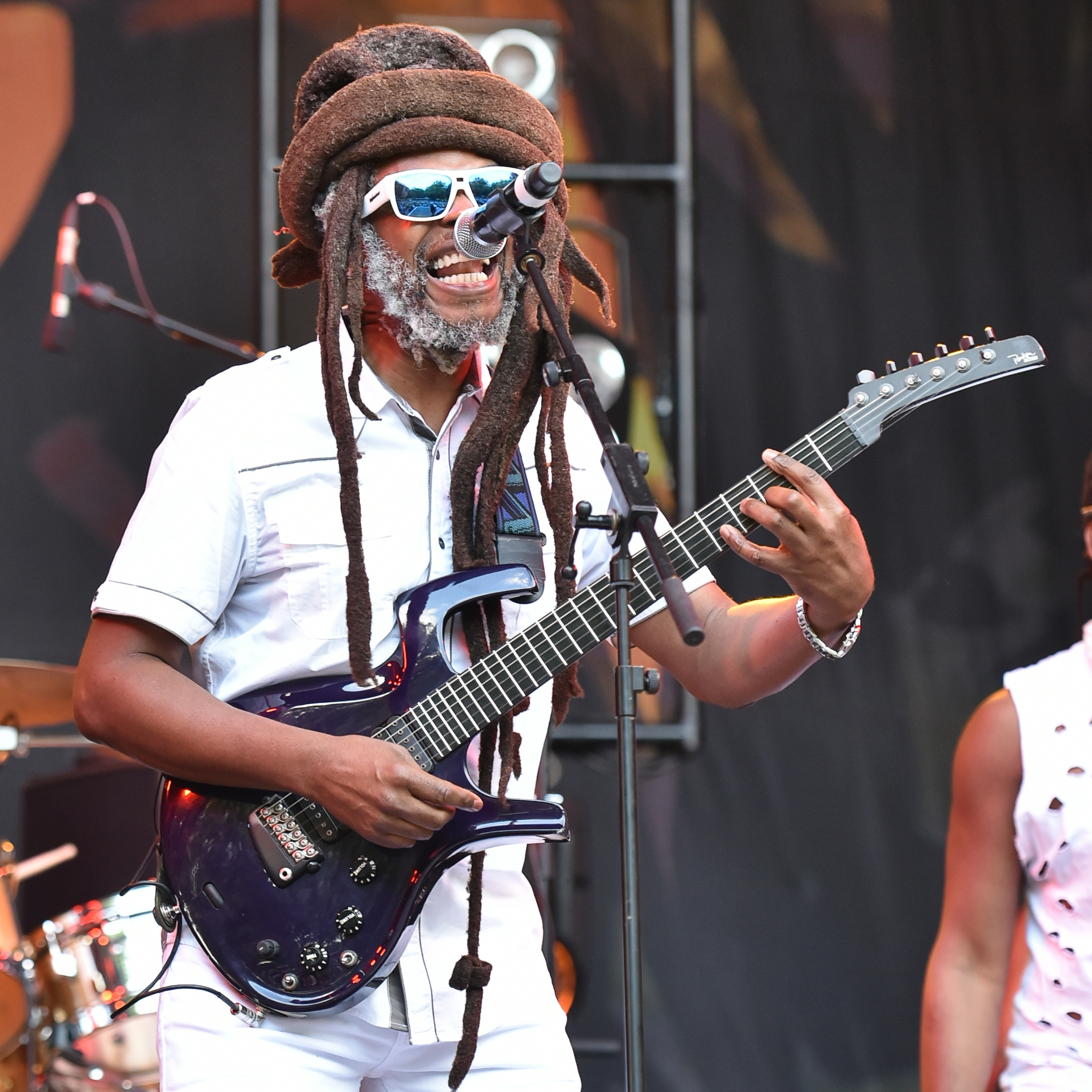
Frontman David Hinds in 2017

In 1997 the band released Rage and Fury.

Until February 2001, it had been many years since Pulse had performed in their hometown of Birmingham. They decided to perform at the Ray Watts memorial concert, which was held at the Irish Centre. Pulse shared the stage with Watts' band, Beshara, along with other artists from Birmingham.

In 2004, Steel Pulse returned to their militant roots with African Holocaust – their eleventh studio album. With guest appearances by Damian Marley, Capleton, and Tiken Jah Fakoly (on the track African Holocaust), the album is a collection of protest and spiritual songs, including "Global Warning" (a dire warning about climate change), "Tyrant", a protest song against political corruption, and "No More Weapons", an anti-war song. Also featured on the album is a cover of the Bob Dylan song, "George Jackson".

In 2007, the band released a music video for the track "Door of No Return". The video was shot on location in Senegal and New York City. The video was directed by Trishul Thejasvi and produced by Yoni Gal. The video had its world premiere at the Times 51st BFI London Film Festival in October 2007.

In a 2013 interview with Midnight Raver, David Hinds indicated that a new studio album and documentary, tentatively titled Steel Pulse: The Definitive Story, would be released in 2014. However, on 10 July 2014 Midnight Raver reported that, according to Hinds, both the studio album and documentary will be delayed until at least 2015.

In anticipation of a new Steel Pulse album, the Roots Reggae Library has indexed two compilation albums of the latest Steel Pulse singles. The albums are called Positivity and Jah Way, both named after tracks on the albums.

In October 2018, Steel Pulse announced their new album, the first in 14 years, Mass Manipulation, was released on Rootfire Cooperative a non-traditional label that provides interest free loans and label services to independent musicians. The single "Stop You Coming and Come" was released on 7 December. The album was nominated for the 2020 Grammy Awards.

On 22 March 2023, the Easy Star All-Stars released a cover of "Five Years" in collaboration with Steel Pulse, from their album Ziggy Stardub, a reggae reimagining of David Bowie's The Rise and Fall of Ziggy Stardust and the Spiders from Mars. A music video, directed by Robert Bartolome, was released on the same day.

Former drummer Conrad Kelly died on 8 May 2024, at the age of 65.

== Awards and nominations ==
A Grammy Award was given for their 1986 album Babylon the Bandit. Steel Pulse has also been nominated for albums Victims (1991), Rastafari Centennial (1992), Rage and Fury (1998), Living Legacy (2000) and Mass Manipulation (2019).

=== Grammy Awards ===
The Grammy Awards are awarded annually by the National Academy of Recording Arts and Sciences. Steel Pulse has received one awards out of nine nominations.

Year	Category	Nominated work	Result
1982	Best Ethnic Or Traditional Folk Recording	"Reggae Sunsplash '81, A Tribute To Bob Marley"	Nominated
1984	Best Reggae Recording	Steppin' Out	Nominated
1986	Best Reggae Recording	"Babylon The Bandit"	Won
1991	Best Reggae Album	"Victim"	Nominated
1993	Best Reggae Album	"Rastafari Centennial/Live In Paris - Elysee Montmartre"	Nominated
1998	Best Reggae Album	"Rage and Fury"	Nominated
2000	Best Reggae Album	"Living Legacy"	Nominated
2005	Best Reggae Album	"African Holocaust"	Nominated
2020	Best Reggae Album	"Mass Manipulation"	Nominated

== Personnel ==
=== Current members ===
- David Hinds – lead vocals, rhythm guitar (1975–present)
- Selwyn Brown – keyboards, backing vocals (1975–present)
- Wayne C# Clarke – drums (2005–present)
- Amlak Tafari – bass (2005–present)
- David Ellecirri Jr. – lead guitar (2012–present)
- Zem Audu – saxophone (2017–present)
- Baruch Hinds – rap and backing vocals (2017–present)

=== Former members ===
Drummers

- Colin Gabbidon – drums (1975–1976)
- Donovan Shaw – drums (1976–1977)
- Steve Nisbett – drums, percussion (1977–2001; died 2018)
- Alphonso Martin – percussion, vocals (1977–1991)
- Mykaell Riley – percussion, backing vocals (1977–1978)
- Conrad Kelly – drums (1994–2005; died 2024)

Guitarists

- Basil Gabbidon – lead guitar, backing vocals (1975–1982)
- Melvin Brown – lead guitar (1982–1989)
- Clifford "Moonie" Pusey – lead guitar (1989–2015)
- Donovan McKitty – lead guitar (2008–2015; died 2017)

Bass players

- Ronald McQueen – bass (1975–1983)
- Alvin Ewen – bass, percussion (1983–2005)

Keyboard players

- Sidney Mills – keyboards, backing vocals (1988–present)
- Tyrone Downie – keyboards (1985)
- Errol Reid – keyboards (1985–1994)

Horns players

- Stephen Bradley – trumpet (2017–present)
- Jerry Johnson – saxophone (1992–1997, 2012–2019)
- Steve Morrison – trombone (1991–1992)
- James Renford – saxophone (1991–1992)
- Kevin Batchelor – trumpet (1992–1997)
- Clark Gayton – trombone (1992–1997)
- Micah Robinson – trombone (1998–2015)

Backing vocalists

- Makiesha McTaggert – backing vocals (2005–2016)
- Yaz Alexander – backing vocals (1991–1997)
- Donna Sterling – backing vocals (1998–2004)
- Sylvia Tella – backing vocals (1998–1999)
- Melanie Lynch – backing vocals (2004–2009)
- Traciana Graves – backing vocals (2004)
- Marea Wilson – backing vocals (2004–2005)

== Discography ==
=== Studio albums ===
- Handsworth Revolution (1978)
- Tribute to the Martyrs (1979)
- Caught You (1980)
- True Democracy (1982)
- Earth Crisis (1984)
- Babylon the Bandit (1986) Grammy Award Winner – Best Reggae Album
- State of Emergency (1988)
- Victims (1991)
- Vex (1994)
- Rage and Fury (1997)
- African Holocaust (2004)
- Mass Manipulation (2019) Grammy Award Nominee – Best Reggae Album (Lost)

=== Live albums ===
- Rastafari Centennial - Live in Paris (Elysee Montmartre) (1992)
- Living Legacy (1998)

=== Compilation albums ===
- Reggae Greats (1984)
- Smash Hits (1993)
- Rastanthology (1996)
- Sound System: The Island Anthology (1997)
- Ultimate Collection (2000)
- 20th Century Masters: The Millennium Collection: The Best of Steel Pulse (2004)
- Rastanthology II: The Sequel (2006)
- Love This Reggae Music: 1975–2015 (2016)

=== Compilation appearances ===
- Short Circuit: Live at the Electric Circus (1977) (one track – Makka Splaff)
- Hope & Anchor Front Row Festival (1978) (one track - Sound Check)
- Urgh! A Music War (1981)

=== Filmography ===
- Live from the Archives (1992)
- Introspective (2005)

=== Singles ===
- "Kibudu Mansatta Abuku" (1976)
- "Nyah Luv" (1977)
- "Ku Klux Klan" (1978)
- "Prodigal Son" (1978)
- "Prediction" (1978)
- "Sound System" (1979)
- "Reggae Fever" (1980)
- "Don't Give In" (1980)
- "Ravers" (1982)
- "Your House" (1982)
- "Steppin' Out" (1984)
- "Reaching Out" (1988)
- "Save Black Music" (1986)
- "Taxi Driver" (1993)
- "Bootstraps" (1994)
- "Brown Eyed Girl" (1996)
- "Global Warning" (2004)
- "No More Weapons" (2004)
- "Door of No Return" (2007)
- "Put Your Hoodies On [4 Trayvon]" (2014)
- "Stop You Coming and Come" (2018)
- "Cry Cry Blood" (2019)
