= Basil Gabbidon =

- Born: 29 October 1955 (age 70)
- Origin: Buff Bay, Jamaica
- Genres: Reggae
- Instrument: Guitar
- Years active: 1975–present
- Label: RunCum Music

Basil Glendon Gabbidon (born 29 October 1955) is a British Jamaican guitarist / vocalist and a founding member of the reggae band Steel Pulse.

Gabbidon lives in Birmingham, and recorded the album Reggae Rockz. The band has played at the Glade Festival, Irie Vibes Festival, Flyover Show as well as having a residency at The Public in West Bromwich.
