= David Hinds =

British musician (born 1956)

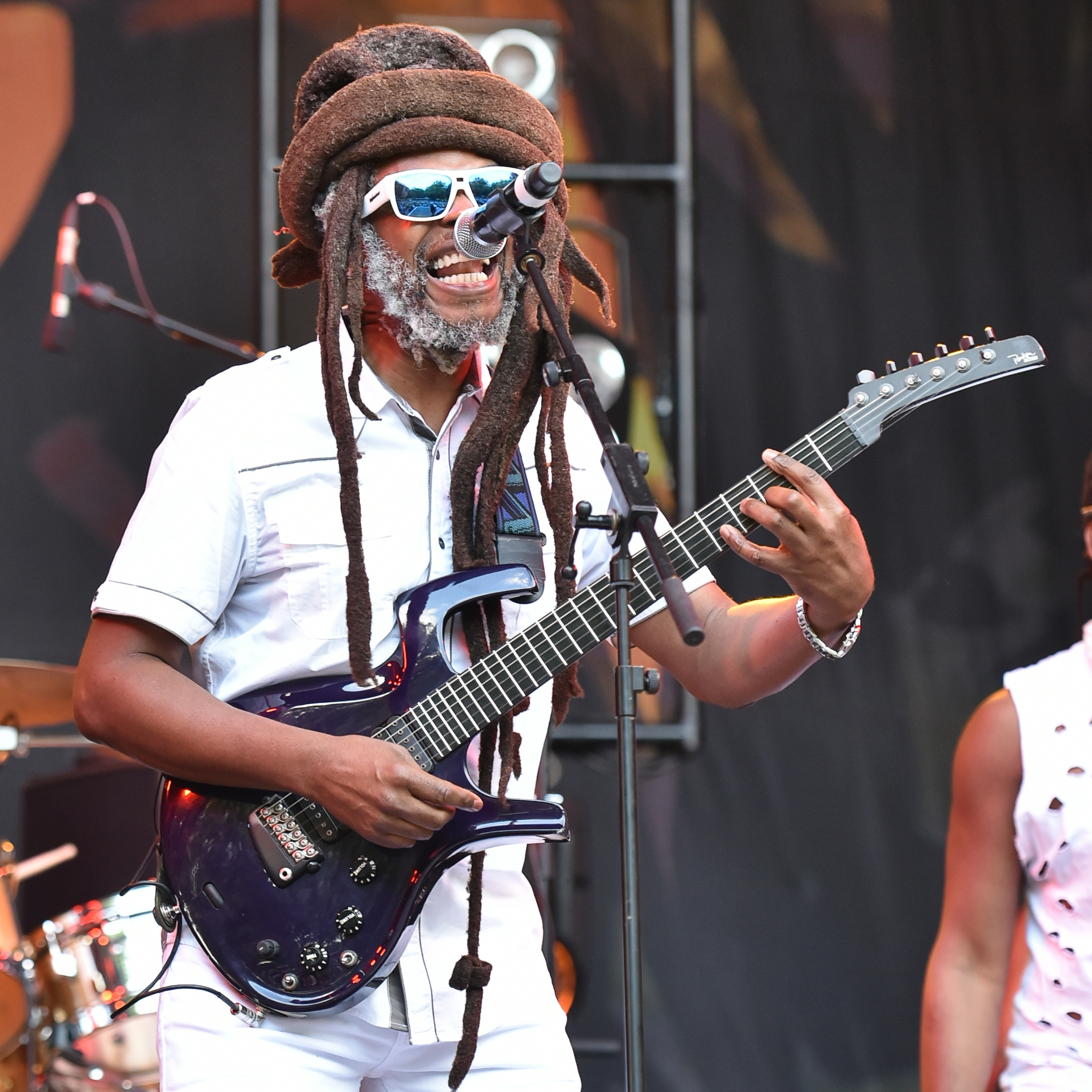
- Hinds in 2017
- Born: 15 June 1956 (age 70); Handsworth, Birmingham, England
- Occupation: Musician
- Years active: 1975–present
- Known for: Lead vocalist for reggae band Steel Pulse
- Relatives: Alison Hinds (cousin)

David Hinds (born 15 June 1956) is a British musician and the founding member, rhythm guitarist and lead vocalist for the Grammy-winning reggae band Steel Pulse.

== Life and career ==
Hinds was born on 15 June 1956 in Handsworth, Birmingham, England, to parents who had migrated to the UK from Jamaica in the mid-1950s, along with many other Jamaicans and other British Caribbean islanders to help rebuild post-World War II Britain. At the age of five, he started elementary school and completed all his schooling by 1974. During that period, the music from Jamaica became a major influence on Hinds' perception on life in years to come. As he explained in an interview on radio programme Afropop Worldwide: "I remember each of my elder siblings coming over with the latest form of music and dance as well as what was happening socially and politically on the island."

At Handsworth Wood Boys Secondary School, Hinds met fellow student Basil Gabbidon; together, they founded Steel Pulse in 1975.

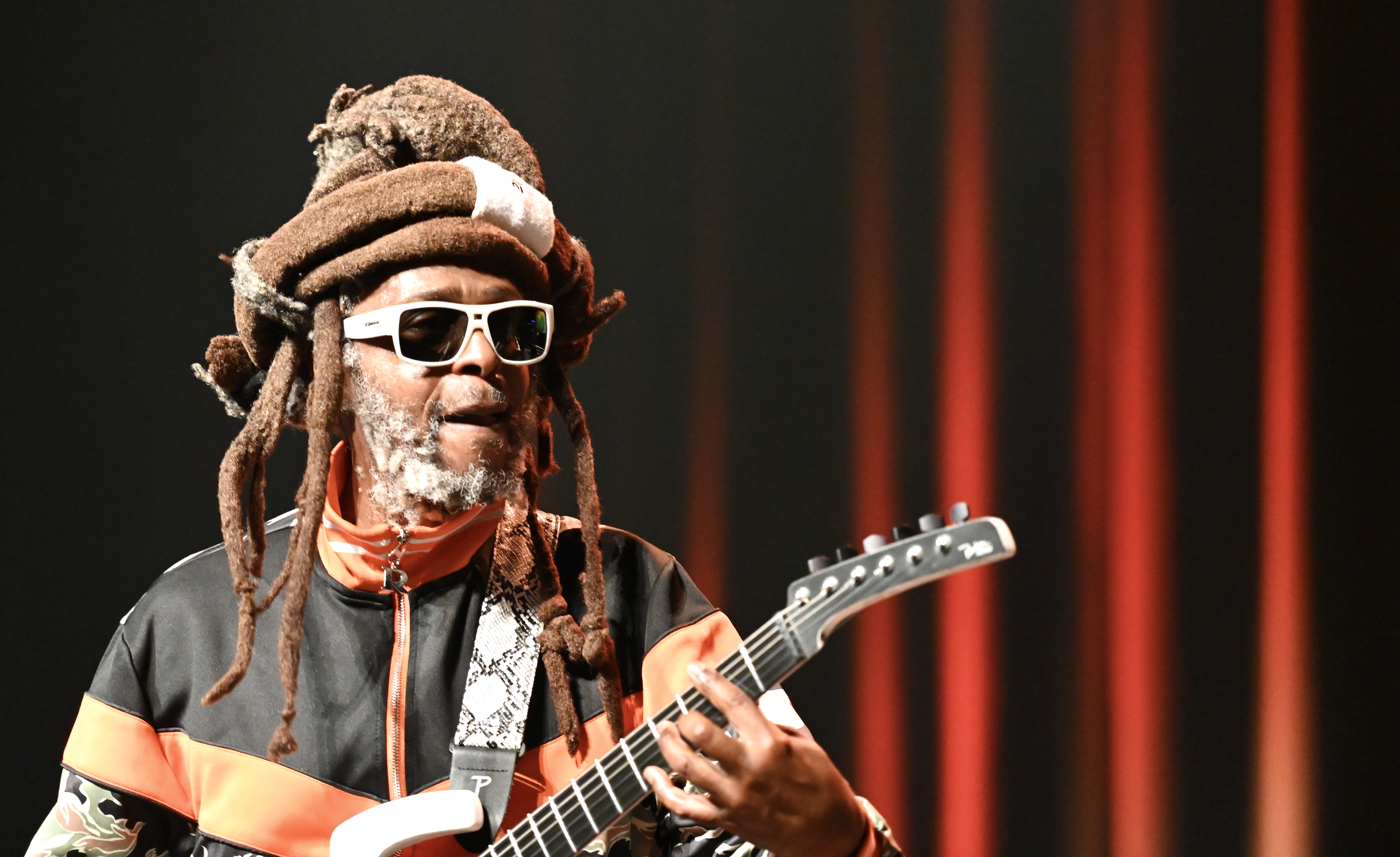
Hinds as frontman of Steel Pulse in concert in Antwerp, 2022.

Outside of Steel Pulse, Hinds has written songs for various films including "Can't Stand It", featured in the film Do The Right Thing, directed by Spike Lee (1989). Hinds has also released two solo singles via the France-based Heartical label.
