= Aswad discography =

- Studio albums: 14
- Live albums: 2
- Compilation albums: 13
- Singles: 41

This is the discography of British reggae band Aswad.

== Albums ==
=== Studio albums ===
| Title | Album details | Peak chart positions | | | | | | Certifications |
| Title | Album details | UK | FRA | NL | NZ | US | US R&B | Certifications |
|---|---|---|---|---|---|---|---|---|
| Aswad | Released: January 1976; Label: Island; Formats: LP, MC | — | — | — | — | — | — | |
| Hulet | Released: September 1979; Label: Island; Formats: LP, MC | — | — | — | — | — | — | |
| New Chapter | Released: 20 November 1981; Label: CBS; Formats: LP, MC | — | — | — | — | — | — | |
| Not Satisfied | Released: July 1982; Label: CBS; Formats: LP, MC | 50 | — | — | — | — | — | |
| Rebel Souls | Released: October 1984; Label: Island; Formats: LP, MC | 48 | — | — | — | — | — | |
| Jah Shaka Meets Aswad in Addis Ababa Studio (with Jah Shaka) | Released: November 1985; Label: Jah Shaka Music; Formats: LP | — | — | — | — | — | — | |
| To the Top | Released: June 1986; Label: Simba; Formats: LP, MC | 71 | — | — | — | — | — | |
| Distant Thunder | Released: 28 March 1988; Label: Mango; Formats: CD, LP, MC | 10 | — | 19 | 10 | 173 | 41 | BPI: Gold |
| Too Wicked | Released: 17 September 1990; Label: Mango; Formats: CD, LP, MC | 51 | — | — | — | — | — | |
| Rise and Shine | Released: 27 June 1994; Label: Bubblin'; Formats: CD, LP, MC; Expanded reissue in April 1995 as Rise and Shine Again! | 38 | — | 64 | — | — | — | |
| Big Up | Released: 13 November 1996; Label: Gut; Formats: CD, LP, MC | — | — | — | — | — | — | |
| Roots Revival | Released: 29 June 1999; Label: Ark 21; Formats: CD, 2xCD | — | — | — | — | — | — | |
| Cool Summer Reggae | Released: 12 August 2002; Label: Universal; Formats: CD, MC | 54 | 77 | — | — | — | — | |
| City Lock | Released: 22 June 2009; Label: Rhythm Riders; Formats: CD | — | — | — | — | — | — | |
"—" denotes releases that did not chart or were not released in that territory.

=== Live albums ===
| Title | Album details | Peak chart positions |
| Title | Album details | UK |
|---|---|---|
| Live and Direct | Released: November 1983; Label: Island; Formats: LP, MC | 57 |
| Live at Rockpalast – Cologne 1980 | Released: 9 December 2016; Label: MIG; Formats: CD+DVD, LP | — |
"—" denotes releases that did not chart or were not released in that territory.

=== Remix albums ===
| Title | Album details |
|---|---|
| A New Chapter of Dub | Released: April 1982; Label: Island; Formats: LP, MC |
| Dub: The Next Frontier | Released: June 1995; Label: Bubblin'; Formats: CD, LP, MC |

=== Compilation albums ===
| Title | Album details | Peak chart positions |
| Title | Album details | UK |
|---|---|---|
| Showcase | Released: April 1981; Label: Groove Music; Formats: LP | — |
| Renaissance – 20 Crucial Tracks | Released: 21 November 1988; Label: Stylus Music; Formats: CD, LP, MC | 52 |
| Crucial Tracks – Best of Aswad | Released: May 1989; Label: Mango/Island; Formats: CD, LP, MC | — |
| Don't Turn Around | Released: May 1993; Label: Spectrum Music; Formats: CD, MC | — |
| Firesticks | Released: July 1993; Label: Mango; Formats: CD, MC | — |
| Greatest Hits | Released: 31 July 1995; Label: Bubblin'; Formats: CD, LP, MC | 20 |
| Roots Rocking – The Island Anthology | Released: 11 March 1997; Label: Island Jamaica; Formats: 2×CD | — |
| The BBC Sessions | Released: 1997; Label: Strange Fruit; Formats: CD | — |
| Classic Aswad – The Universal Masters Collection | Released: 1999; Label: Island; Formats: CD | — |
| The Collection | Released: August 2003; Label: Sony Music; Formats: CD; US-only release | — |
| Reggae Warriors – The Best of Aswad | Released: 13 July 2009; Label: Music Club Deluxe; Formats: 2xCD | — |
| The Best of Aswad – Don't Turn Around | Released: 23 July 2012; Label: Island Def Jam; Formats: CD | — |
| Gold | Released: 14 August 2020; Label: Crimson; Formats: 3xCD, LP, digital download | — |
"—" denotes releases that did not chart.

== Singles ==
| Title | Year | Peak chart positions | | | | | | | | | | Certifications | Album |
| Title | Year | UK | BEL (FLA) | FIN | FRA | GER | IRE | NL | NOR | NZ | US R&B | Certifications | Album |
|---|---|---|---|---|---|---|---|---|---|---|---|---|---|
| "Back to Africa" | 1976 | — | — | — | — | — | — | — | — | — | — | | Aswad |
| "Three Babylon" | 1976 | — | — | — | — | — | — | — | — | — | — | | Non-album singles |
| "It's Not Our Wish (That We Should Fight)" / "Stranger" | 1978 | — | — | — | — | — | — | — | — | — | — | | Non-album singles |
| "Rainbow Culture" | 1980 | — | — | — | — | — | — | — | — | — | — | | Non-album singles |
| "Warrior Charge" (featuring Tromie and Bami) | 1980 | — | — | — | — | — | — | — | — | — | — | | Non-album singles |
| "Babylon" | 1981 | — | — | — | — | — | — | — | — | — | — | | Non-album singles |
| "Finger Gun Style" | 1981 | — | — | — | — | — | — | — | — | — | — | | Non-album singles |
| "Ways of the Lord" | 1981 | — | — | — | — | — | — | — | — | — | — | | New Chapter |
| "Pass the Cup" | 1982 | — | — | — | — | — | — | — | — | — | — | | Not Satisfied |
| "Girl's Got to Know" | 1982 | — | — | — | — | — | — | — | — | — | — | | Not Satisfied |
| "African Children Part 2" | 1982 | — | — | — | — | — | — | — | — | — | — | | Not Satisfied |
| "Roots Rockin" | 1983 | — | — | — | — | — | — | — | — | — | — | | Non-album single |
| "Chasing for the Breeze" | 1984 | 51 | — | — | — | — | — | — | — | — | — | | Rebel Souls |
| "54-46 (Was My Number)" | 1984 | 70 | — | — | — | — | — | — | — | — | — | | Rebel Souls |
| "Need Your Love (Each and Every Day)" | 1985 | — | — | — | — | — | — | — | — | — | — | | Rebel Souls |
| "Bubbling" | 1985 | 91 | — | — | — | — | — | — | — | — | — | | To the Top |
| "Kool Noh" | 1985 | 93 | — | — | — | — | — | — | — | — | — | | To the Top |
| "Pull Up" | 1986 | 99 | — | — | — | — | — | — | — | — | — | | To the Top |
| "Hooked on You" | 1987 | 79 | — | — | — | — | — | — | — | — | — | | To the Top |
| "Don't Turn Around" | 1988 | 1 | 6 | 26 | — | 29 | 4 | 5 | 10 | 1 | 45 | BPI: Silver; RMNZ: Gold | Distant Thunder |
| "Give a Little Love" | 1988 | 11 | — | — | — | 58 | 16 | 69 | — | 25 | — | | Distant Thunder |
| "Set Them Free" | 1988 | 70 | — | — | — | — | — | — | — | — | — | | Distant Thunder |
| "Beauty's Only Skin Deep" | 1989 | 31 | — | — | — | — | — | 57 | — | — | — | | Crucial Tracks – Best of Aswad |
| "On and On" | 1989 | 25 | — | — | — | — | — | — | — | — | — | | Non-album single |
| "Next to You" | 1990 | 24 | 46 | — | — | — | — | 18 | — | 31 | — | | Too Wicked |
| "Smile" (featuring Sweetie Irie) | 1990 | 53 | — | — | — | — | — | — | — | — | — | | Too Wicked |
| "Best of My Love" (Note: Released in the UK on the EP Too Wicked.) | 1991 | 61 | — | — | — | — | — | — | — | 49 | — | | Too Wicked |
| "How Long" (with Yazz) | 1993 | 31 | — | — | — | 52 | — | — | — | — | — | | One on One (Yazz album) |
| "Dancehall Mood" | 1993 | 48 | — | — | — | — | — | — | — | — | — | | Rise and Shine Again! |
| "Shine" | 1994 | 5 | 17 | 18 | 25 | 39 | 7 | 17 | — | 28 | — | BPI: Silver | Rise and Shine Again! |
| "Warriors" | 1994 | 33 | — | — | — | — | — | — | — | — | — | | Rise and Shine Again! |
| "We Are One People" | 1994 | — | — | — | — | 96 | — | — | — | — | — | | Rise and Shine Again! |
| "You're No Good" | 1995 | 35 | — | — | — | 88 | — | — | — | — | — | | Rise and Shine Again! |
| "If I Was" | 1995 | 58 | — | — | — | — | — | — | — | — | — | | Big Up |
| "One Shot Chilla" | 1997 | — | — | — | — | — | — | — | — | — | — | | Big Up |
| "Roxanne" | 1997 | — | — | — | — | — | — | — | — | — | — | | Reggatta Mondatta – A Reggae Tribute to the Police |
| "Invisible Sun" (with Sting) | 1998 | — | — | — | — | 97 | — | — | — | — | — | | Roots Revival |
| "Follow '99" | 1999 | — | — | — | — | — | — | — | — | — | — | | Roots Revival |
| "Shy Guy" (featuring Easther Bennett) | 2002 | 62 | — | — | — | — | — | — | — | — | — | | Cool Summer Reggae |
| "What Is Love?" | 2009 | — | — | — | — | — | — | — | — | — | — | | City Lock |
| "Calling" / "Do That Thing" | 2009 | — | — | — | — | — | — | — | — | — | — | | City Lock |
"—" denotes releases that did not chart or were not released in that territory.
