= Brinsley Forde =

English singer and actor (born 1953)

Brinsley Forde MBE
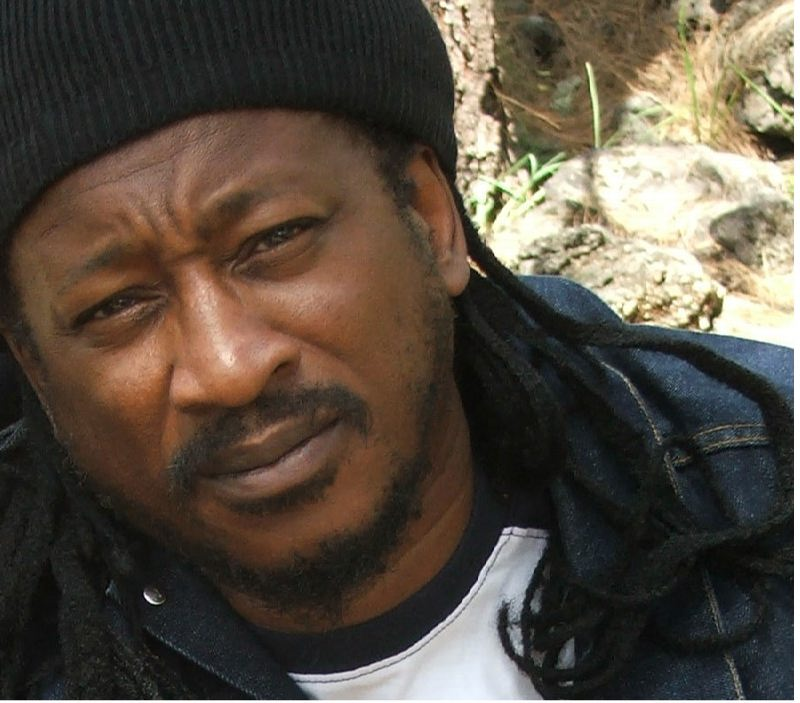
- Forde in 2009
- Born: Brinsley Allan Forde; 16 October 1953 (age 72); Islington, London, England
- Years active: 1970–present
- Musical career
- Instruments: Vocals; guitar
- Formerly of: Aswad

Brinsley Forde MBE (born 16 October 1953) is a British singer and actor of Guyanese parentage who is best known as the founder member of the reggae band Aswad and as a child actor in the children's television series Here Come the Double Deckers! (1970–71).

== Biography ==
=== Acting ===
Forde appeared as Herman in two episodes of the television sitcom Please Sir!. He appeared as Wesley in the feature film of the same name in 1971. Forde's feature film debut had come a year earlier when he played a substantial role in the John Boorman film Leo the Last (1970), which was filmed in West London in the streets soon to be demolished to make way for the Lancaster West Estate. Forde appeared in the James Bond film Diamonds Are Forever and the television programme The Georgian House. In 1980, he starred in the drama film Babylon (directed by Franco Rosso), as Blue, a disenfranchised youth who becomes a deejay on a South London reggae soundsystem.

=== Music ===
Forde presented VH1 Soul Vibrations, BBC's Ebony & Ebony on the road, and was one of the radio presenters to open the BBC's first digital station 6 Music with his radio show Lively Up Yourself and Dub Bashment. Forde can be heard presenting the radio documentaries Behind The Smile: The Real Life of Bob Marley and Island Rock to mark the 40th anniversary of Jamaican independence.

A two-time Grammy Award nominee with the reggae group Aswad, Forde scored a British number-one chart hit with "Don't Turn Around" in 1988, followed by another top 20 chart hit, "Give A Little Love". The band continued to feature in the top 20 on the British charts with the album Distant Thunder, and the tracks "On and On", "Next to You" and "Shine".

In September 2009, Forde appeared with Dizzee Rascal performing "Can't Tek No More" from the latter's album Tongue n' Cheek on the BBC Two show Later... with Jools Holland. Forde followed this up with a repeat performance as part of the BBC Electric Proms in October 2009.

=== Honours ===
Forde was appointed Member of the Order of the British Empire (MBE) in the 2015 New Year Honours for services to the arts.

== Filmography ==
=== Film ===
Title	Role	Year(s)
Leo the Last	Bip	1970
Diamonds Are Forever	Joshua, houseboy	1971
Babylon	Blue	1980
Goodbye Charlie Bright	Floyd	2001

=== Television ===
Title	Role	Year(s)
Here Come the Double Deckers!	Spring	1970–1971
Please Sir!	Wesley	1971
The Georgian House	Ngo, Slaveboy	1976

== Discography ==
=== Albums ===
Year	Album
1976	Aswad
1979	Hulet
1981	New Chapter
1981	Showcase
1982	A New Chapter of Dub
1982	Not Satisfied
1983	Live and Direct
1984	Rebel Souls
1986	To the Top
1988	Jah Shaka Meets Aswad in Addis Ababa Studio
1988	Renaissance – 20 Crucial Tracks
1988	Distant Thunder
1989	Crucial Tracks (Best of Aswad)
1990	Too Wicked
1990	Next to You
1993	Firesticks
1994	Rise and Shine
1995	Greatest Hits
1995	Dub: The Next Frontier
1995	Rise and Shine Again!
1997	Big Up
1997	Roots Rocking: Island Anthology
1999	Roots Revival
2001	25 Live: 25th Anniversary
2002	Cool Summer Reggae
2009	City Lock

=== Singles ===
Year	Single
1984	"Chasing for the Breeze"
1984	"54-46 (Was My Number)"
1984	"Need Your Love"
1985	"Bubbling"
1986	"Kool Noh"
1986	"Pull Up"
1987	"Hooked on You"
1988	"Don't Turn Around"
1988	"Give a Little Love"
1988	"Set Them Free"
1989	"Beauty's Only Skin Deep"
1989	"On and On"
1990	"Next to You"
1990	"Smile"
1991	"Best of My Love"
1993	"How Long" (with Yazz)
1993	"Dancehall Mood"
1994	"Shine"
1994	"Warriors"
1994	"We Are One People"
1995	"You're No Good"
1995	"If I Was"
1997	"One Shot Chilla"
1997	"Roxanne"
1998	"Invisible Sun" (with Sting)
1999	"Follow '99"
2002	"Shy Guy"
