= Rivarol =

Rivarol may refer to:

- Antoine de Rivarol (Antoine Rivaroli, 1753–1801), French writer
- Louisa Henrietta de Rivarol (1749–1821), Antoine's wife, a French translator
- Rivarol (magazine), French magazine published since 1951
