= Distant Thunder (album) =

Studio album by Aswad
- Released: 28 March 1988
- Studio: The Fallout Shelter (Hammersmith, London); The Point (London, England); Eastcote (London, England); Strongroom (London, England); Sarm West (Notting Hill, West London); Sarm East (Whitechapel, London); Rooster (West London, England); RAK (London, England)
- Genre: Reggae
- Length: 44:24
- Label: Mango
- Producer: Aswad; Chris Porter; Ron Fair

Aswad chronology
To the Top (1986)	Distant Thunder (1988)	Too Wicked (1990)

Professional ratings
Review scores
Source	Rating
AllMusic	3/5 stars
Record Mirror	3/5 stars

Distant Thunder is a studio album by British reggae band Aswad, released in March 1988 through Mango Records. The recording sessions took place at the Fallout Shelter, The Point, Eastcote, Strongroom, Sarm West & East, Rooster, and RAK Studios in London. The album was produced by Aswad, Chris Porter, and Ron Fair.

== Track listing ==
No.	Title	Writer(s)	Length
1.	"The Message"	Patrick Patterson; Steve Scipio	4:33
2.	"Don't Turn Around"	Diane Warren; Albert Hammond	3:38
3.	"Set Them Free"	Brinsley Forde; Angus Gaye; Anthony Robinson; Leslie Forde	4:39
4.	"Smokey Blues"	Brinsley Forde; Angus Gaye; Anthony Robinson; Leslie Forde	3:09
5.	"I Can't Get Over You"	Brinsley Forde; Angus Gaye; Anthony Robinson; Leslie Forde	3:20
6.	"Give a Little Love"	Albert Hammond; Diane Warren	4:33
7.	"Tradition"	Brinsley Forde; Angus Gaye; Anthony Robinson; Leslie Forde	4:51
8.	"Feelings"	Brinsley Forde; Angus Gaye; Anthony Robinson; Leslie Forde	3:48
9.	"International Melody"	Brinsley Forde; Angus Gaye; Anthony Robinson; Leslie Forde	3:15
10.	"Bittersweet"	Brinsley Forde; Angus Gaye; Anthony Robinson; Leslie Forde	3:51
11.	"Justice"	Brinsley Forde; Angus Gaye; Anthony Robinson; Leslie Forde	4:47
Total length:			44:24

== Personnel ==
Aswad

- Brinsley "Dan" Forde – lead vocals, rhythm and lead guitar
- Dennis Anthony "Tony Gad" Robinson – lead vocals (track 8), vocals, bass guitar, Roland bass & keyboard
- Angus "Drummie Zeb" Gaye – lead vocals, drums, mixing

with:

- Eddie "Tan Tan" Thornton – trumpet
- Michael "Bami" Rose – saxophone
- Henry "Buttons" Tenyue – trombone
- Alan "Burt" Williams – saxophone
- Stanley "Soon Come" Andrew – lead guitar
- Michael "Cool Walk" Martin – keyboards
- Dee Lewis – backing vocals
- Carroll Edwina Thompson – backing vocals
- Caron Melina Wheeler – backing vocals
- Chyna Gordon – backing vocals

Technical

- Lee Hamblin – engineering
- Nick Sykes – engineering
- Jonny Milton – engineering
- Philip Bagenal – engineering
- Ron Fair – engineering, producer (track 6)
- Peter Gleadall – programming
- Duncan Bridgeman – programming
- Christopher John Ames Porter – producer (track 2)
- Lawrence Watson – photography

== Charts ==
Chart (1988)	Peak position
Dutch Albums (Album Top 100)	19
New Zealand Albums (RMNZ)	10
UK Albums (OCC)	10
US Billboard 200	173
US Top R&B/Hip-Hop Albums (Billboard)	41
