= Albertine-Elisabeth Pater =

Dutch and French aristocrat and spy

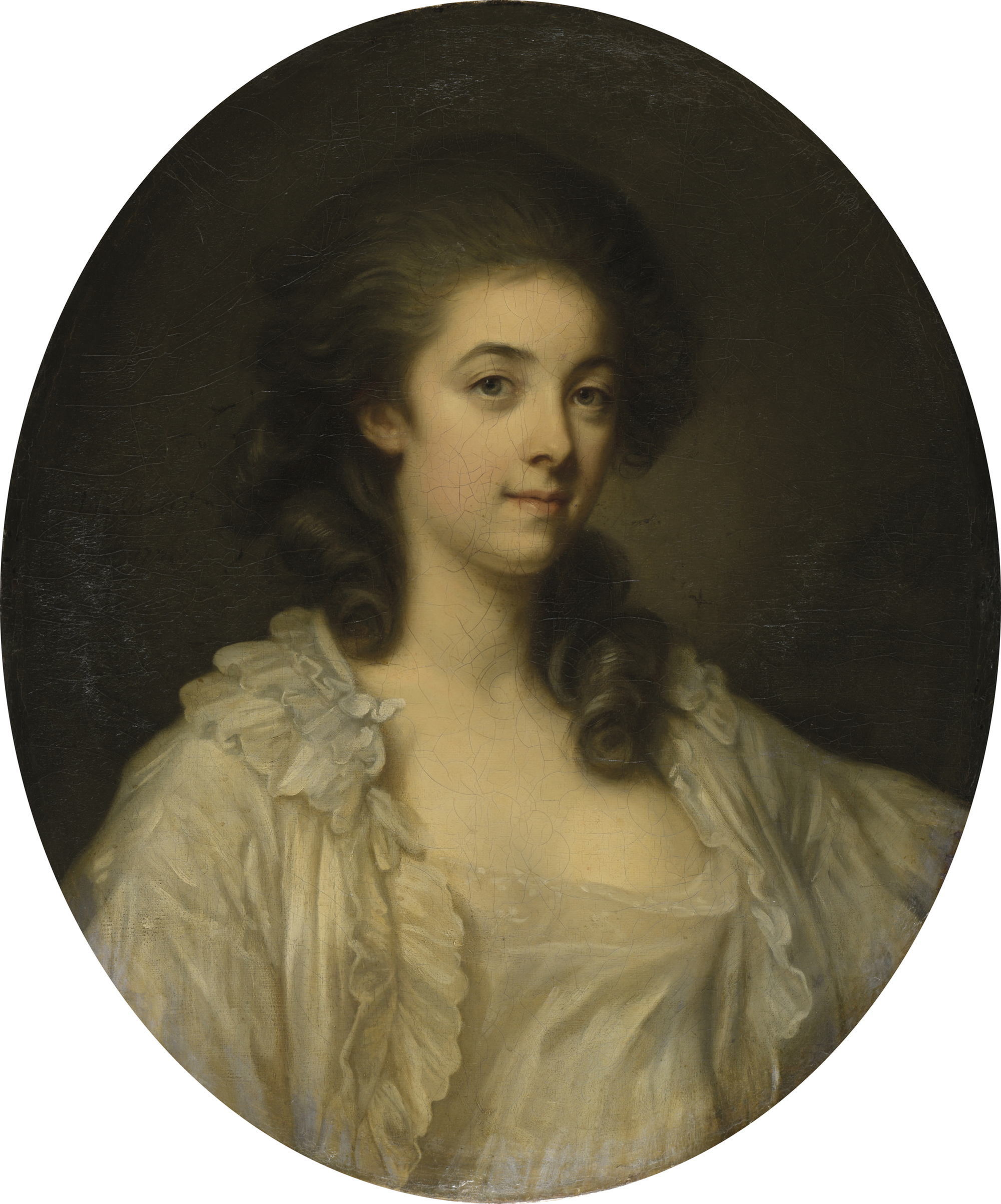
Albertine-Elisabeth Pater

Albertine-Elisabeth Pater (1742–1817), was a Dutch and French aristocrat and spy. She is known as the secret mistress of Louis XV in 1771. She was the king's Petite maîtresse (unofficial mistress), not his Maîtresse-en-titre (official mistress).

== Life ==
She was the daughter of the Dutch baron Johann Gisbert von Neukirchen or Nyvenheim (1705–1792) and Margriet van Wijhe (1714– ?), and married the rich Dutch banker Gerhard Pater in 1750. She separated from her spouse in 1763 and settled in Paris under the name and title baronne de Nieukerque. By the allowance and inheritance from her spouse, which was founded on diamond mines and slave plantations in Dutch Suriname, she was very rich.

She was at one point the lover of minister Étienne François, duc de Choiseul, who collaborated with the Emmanuel-Armand de Richelieu, duc d'Aiguillon to depose the king's mistress Madame Du Barry by arranging an affair between the king and Pater and suggest that he enter into a secret morganatic marriage with her. The plot failed but attracted attention and is documented in contemporary letters.

In 1779, she remarried Louis-Quentin de Richebourg, Marquis de Champcenetz (father of Louis René Quentin de Richebourg de Champcenetz). Through her personal friend Diane de Polignac, she became a member of the private circle of Marie Antoinette at Trianon. She emigrated when the French Revolution erupted in 1789, but returned in 1791.

Albertine-Elisabeth Pater used her personal fortune to finance the political party of the Dutch patriots. She allied herself with the French royalist émigrées, and acted as their financier as well as a go-between and agent between them and their contacts in France. She acted as a go-between in the correspondence between Marie Antoinette and Yolande de Polastron.

She was arrested and imprisoned for counterrevolutionary activity during the Reign of Terror but was released after the fall of Robespierre. After the release, she resumed her activity as an agent and financier of the exiled French royalist émigrées, taking her orders from the count of Artois. She was exiled with her spouse in 1803 accused of involvement in the Pichegru Conspiracy.
