= Drummie Zeb =

British reggae musician (1959–2022)

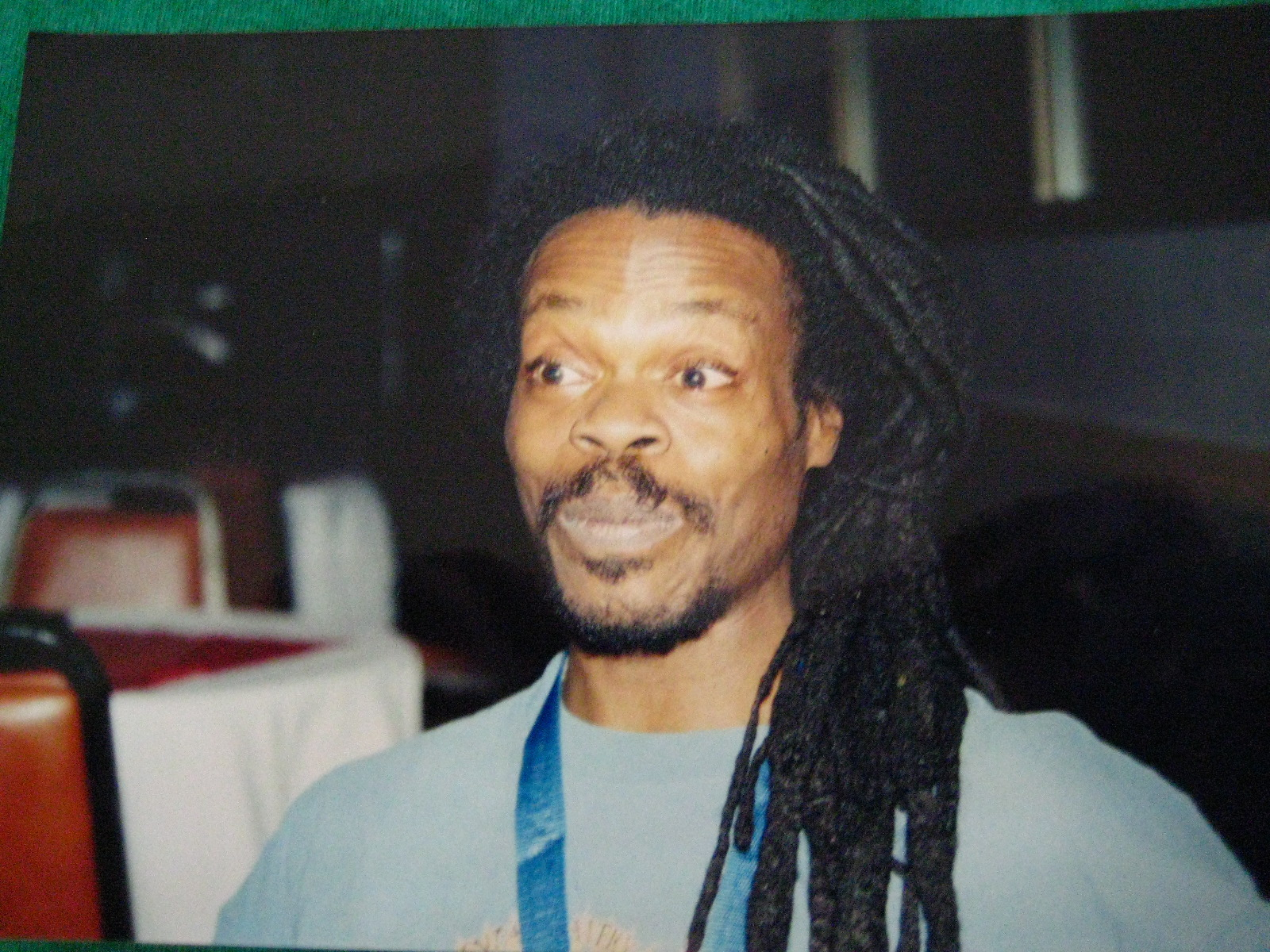
- Born: Angus Gaye; 24 September 1959; London, England
- Died: 2 September 2022 (aged 62)
- Years active: 1975–2022
- Children: 6
- Musical career
- Genre: Reggae
- Occupations: Singer; drummer; record producer
- Formerly of: Aswad

Angus Gaye (24 September 1959 – 2 September 2022), better known as Drummie Zeb, was an English musician. He was the drummer and vocalist for the reggae band Aswad, as well as a record producer for other artists.

== Early life ==
Gaye was born in London on 24 September 1959. His parents immigrated to the United Kingdom from Carriacou, Grenada, as part of the Windrush generation. He grew up in the Ladbroke Grove area of West London and studied at the Holland Park School in his hometown where he met his future bandmates Tony Robinson and Brinsley Forde.

Gaye took an interest in drumming after a cousin, who was a drummer, started living at his family home as a tenant. He would use anything he had at hand to use as a drum. His father bought him his first drum at the age of eight so he would stop damaging family property and Gaye eventually became a kit drummer in the local steelpan band called the "Metronomes".

== Career ==
In 1975, Gaye saw an advertisement for the band Aswad and turned up for the audition, where he was successful in getting the part of the drummer. They became the first British reggae group to sign with an international label, signing up with Island Records in 1975. Gaye was the only member who remained a part of the band throughout its existence. As the songs of the band became more commercial-oriented in nature in the 1980s, he started assuming most of the lead vocalist duties and eventually replaced Forde.

Aswad gained popularity after the release of their debut single "Back to Africa" in 1976. They followed this up with Love Fire (1981), Rise and Shine (1994), which earned a Grammy nomination for Best Reggae Album, Dub: The Next Frontier (1995), and Cool Summer Reggae (2002). Aswad ultimately released 21 albums and received two more Grammy nominations. By 2006, he and Robinson were the only founding members still playing with the group. Aswad released their last album, City Lock, in 2009.

Outside of Aswad, Gaye served as a record producer for Ace of Base whose 1994 rendition of the single "Don't Turn Around" became a global hit, and played what was described by David Katz as a "distinctive drum pattern" in Janet Kay's 1979 single "Silly Games" which peaked at number 2 on the UK Singles Chart. He also worked with Sweetie Irie, Joe, Vanessa-Mae, Carroll Thompson and others.

== Personal life ==
Gaye had six children, including Soloman who is also a reggae artist. He died on 2 September 2022 at the age of 62. The cause of death has not been given.
