= Here Come the Double Deckers! =

1971 British children's TV series

- Created by: Harry Booth; Roy Simpson; Glyn Jones
- Starring: Michael Audreson; Gillian Bailey; Bruce Clark; Peter Firth; Brinsley Forde; Melvyn Hayes; Debbie Russ; Douglas Simmonds
- Country of origin: United Kingdom

Production
- Running time: 22 minutes (approx.) per episode

Original release
- Network: BBC1
- Release: 1 January – 30 April 1971

Here Come the Double Deckers! is a 17-part British children's television series originally broadcast in 1971 on BBC1, revolving around the adventures of seven children whose den was an old red double-decker London bus in a scrap yard.

== The show ==
A co-production between British independent film company Century Films and 20th Century Fox Television, it is a children's adventure sitcom. The shows are about 22 minutes in length.

The programme made its US debut on 12 September 1970 on ABC, and began in the UK on 1 January 1971 on BBC1. In the US, the series was repeated on Sunday mornings on ABC from 12 September 1971 to 3 September 1972.

The series was repeated in the UK by the BBC until 1977, and then during the early 1990s on a number of ITV companies.

Each week saw the gang in a separate adventure, including episodes based around a runaway homemade hovercraft, a chocolate factory and invading 'Martians' with guns that shoot out chocolate candy, a disastrous camping holiday, collecting tin foil for a guide dog, becoming pop moguls with their protégé 'The Cool Cavalier', and a haunted stately home.

Some of the cast were unknown, though Melvyn Hayes was an established adult actor, Gillian Bailey was fairly experienced for a child actor and both Brinsley Forde and Michael Audreson had appeared in The Magnificent Six and a Half, a series of Children's Film Foundation films on which the Double Deckers were based. Hayes also wrote the episode "Man's Best Friend", co-wrote the episode "Get a Movie On!", co-wrote the series' theme music, and acted as a dialogue coach for the series. Bailey went on to become head of the drama department at Royal Holloway, University of London, and as at July 2023 is Professor of Women's Performance Histories at the Royal Central School of Speech and Drama in London. Peter Firth has gone on to a prominent acting career, appearing in Equus, The Hunt for Red October, Tess, Pearl Harbor and Spooks (known in some territories as MI-5). Co-star Brinsley Forde later became the lead singer in Aswad.

The series was originally scheduled for 26 episodes (as well as a second series of 26 additional episodes), but production ceased after 17 had been completed.

== Cast ==
=== Children ===
- Michael Audreson - Brains, the gang's brightest member and resident boffin.
- Gillian Bailey - Billie, the tomboyish 'mother' figure of the gang.
- Bruce Clark - Sticks, the sole U.S. member of the gang, so-named because of his drumming skills
- Peter Firth - Scooper, the leader of the gang.
- Brinsley Forde - Spring, the sole black member of the gang.
- Debbie Russ - Tiger, the youngest member of the gang, who has a stuffed animal tiger also called "Tiger".
- Douglas Simmonds (18 February 1958 - 15 March 2011) - Doughnut, the most food-obsessed of the gang and constantly eating

=== Guest stars ===
- Melvyn Hayes - Albert (all episodes except 4, 9, 12, 13, 15, 16 and 17).
- Ivor Salter was in many of the episodes, usually as a police officer.
- Julian Orchard, Jack Haig, Roy Evans in episode 2.
- Norman Vaughan in episode 3.
- David Lodge, Hugh Walters, Bob Todd, Liz Fraser in episode 4.
- Clive Dunn, Frederick Peisley, Pat Coombs in episode 5.
- Betty Marsden, Hugh Paddick, George Woodbridge in episode 6.
- Anthony May in episode 7.
- Jane Seymour, Tim Barrett, George Benson, John Barrard, Bob Hornery, Ruth Kettlewell in episode 8.
- Frank Thornton, Michael Sharvell-Martin in episode 9.
- David Hutcheson, Jimmy Gardner, Robin Askwith in episode 10.
- Graham Stark, Nora Nicholson, Nicholas Phipps, Jennifer Daniel in episode 11.
- Sam Kydd, John Horsley, Michael Brennan in episode 12.
- Julian Chagrin in episode 13.
- Pat Coombs, Derek Royle, Jack Haig, Bob Todd, John Barrard in episode 15.
- Timothy Bateson, Ann Lancaster in episode 16.
- Damaris Hayman, John Clive, Lucy Griffiths in episode 17.

== Episodes ==
No.	Title	Original release date
1	"Tiger Takes Off"	12 September 1970
Tiger accidentally goes for a trip on a hovercraft Brains created, and chaos ensues!
2	"The Case of the Missing Doughnut"	19 September 1970
Doughnut eats an invisibility formula Brains invented.
3	"Get a Movie On"	26 September 1970
The gang make a film to enter a contest, and Brains is left to somehow edit the footage - what will he come up with?
4	"Starstruck"	3 October 1970
The gang are chased by security around Elstree Studios as they look for a movie star's runaway dog.
5	"Happy Haunting"	10 October 1970
Albert takes the gang to a stately home for a day out.
6	"Summer Camp"	17 October 1970
The gang camp in a field with a middle-aged couple who get the worst of it.
7	"The Pop Singer"	24 October 1970
Sidney, a never-was musician, is discovered hiding in the gang's bus. They attempt to reinvent him as 'The Cool Cavalier' with a performance and disco in the yard.
8	"Scooper Strikes Out"	31 October 1970
Scooper is knocked out by a baseball and dreams he is with Alice in Wonderland (played by Jane Seymour).
9	"Robbie the Robot"	7 November 1970
Brains invents a robot which is sent to rescue Tiger's tiger from a neighbour's garden, and later becomes the hit of the television show "Inventors' Club".
10	"The Go-Karters"	14 November 1970
A biker sabotages the gang's go-kart, as a result of which Spring ends up in court after a high-speed police chase.
11	"A Helping Hound"	21 November 1970
The gang unsuccessfully try to help a woman threatened with eviction to decorate her house, but help comes when Tiger receives a large cash reward for finding a lost dog.
12	"Invaders from Space"	28 November 1970
Men in spacesuits are advertising a new sweet called Planet 7, but the gang think it is an alien invasion.
13	"Barney"	5 December 1970
The gang befriend Barney, a one-man band who keeps getting moved on by the police. When he suddenly hits the big time with a special gig, they decide they have to be there to see him.
14	"Man's Best Friend"	12 December 1970
Inspired by Albert, the gang put on a show - based on 'Laugh-In' - with aluminium foil as an entry fee to buy a guide dog for the blind.
15	"United We Stand"	19 December 1970
The owner of the yard that the gang use wants to turn it into a car park, but the kids sabotage his meeting with the Mayor.
16	"Up to Scratch"	16 December 1970
Billie has to look after a dog named Scratch which runs off after a man with a flea circus turns up.
17	"A Hit for a Miss"	2 January 1971
The boys fall for substitute teacher Miss Petit, which makes Billie jealous, and help her put on a show for an old folks home.

== Original soundtrack ==
Music played a prominent part in the programme, with an original soundtrack sung by the cast and written by Harry Booth, Melvyn Hayes and Johnny Arthey. The music was composed and directed by Ivor Slaney. An 11-track album of this was issued on Capitol Records in 1970 and re-issued as a CD in 2007 with liners notes by David Noades.

1. It's a Day and a Half (from episode 5)
2. To the Countryside (from episode 6)
3. Good Day at Yellow Rock (from episode 3)
4. With a Little Bit of Love (from episode 17)
5. I Gotta Get Through (from episode 7, sung by Anthony May)
6. Get on Board (Title song)
7. Life Is a Wonderful Thing (from episode 7)
8. Grannie's Rocking Chair (from episode 6)
9. One Man Band (from episode 13)
10. Welcome to the Party (from episode 8. Peter Firth [Scooper] was the only one of the gang singing in this. Jane Seymour, Melvyn Hayes and others cast members sang too.)
11. Fat Ladies (from episode 17)

== Telecast and home media ==
The programme made its US debut on 12 September 1970 at 10:30 am ET on ABC, and in the United Kingdom began at 4.55 pm on 1 January 1971 on BBC1. In the US, the series was repeated on Sunday mornings on ABC from 12 September 1971 to 3 September 1972, in the same time slot.

The series was given a repeat in the United Kingdom during the early 1990s by certain ITV companies.

In the United Kingdom, Here Come the Double Deckers was released in November 2010 by Second Sight as a two-disc Region 2 DVD set containing all 17 episodes. All the episodes are presented as originally aired. The set also includes a special feature, Double Decker Memories, featuring interviews with Brinsley Forde and Michael Audreson.

== Comic strip ==
Children's comic Whizzer and Chips ran a "Double Deckers" cartoon strip from 22 May 1971 until 13 May 1972.

== Go for a Take ==
Debbie Russ appears as herself/Tiger in the comedy film Go for a Take (1972), which was directed and co-written by Harry Booth. The film stars Reg Varney and is set in a film studio. Evidently, Here Come the Double Deckers is one of the shows in production within the fiction of the film. Unfortunately the original stuffed tiger prop had been lost shortly after filming had been completed on the series, so a lookalike had to be used. Tiger refers to the character "Brains". Production was at Pinewood Studios and on location.

== The Magnificent Six and 1/2 ==
Prior to Here Come the Double Deckers, Century Films produced a film serial for the Children's Film Foundation called The Magnificent Six and 1/2. The series was very similar to the Double Deckers, and essentially acted as a blueprint for the latter. Like the Double Deckers, Six and a Half centred on the adventures of seven children, who had similar personalities to the characters in Double Deckers. Many of the crew members from the Six and a Half series also worked on the Double Deckers, including producer Roy Simpson, director and writer Harry Booth, writer Glyn Jones, and choreographer Arnold Taraborrelli (who designed the title cards for Six and a Half). In addition, future Double Deckers cast members Brinsley Forde and Michael Audreson were among the stars of Six and a Half, and Melvyn Hayes appeared in a few episodes. Six and a Half also featured several gags and plotlines that would later be reused in Double Deckers.
