= Lucy Russell (actress) =

English actress

- Born: England
- Occupation: Actress
- Years active: 1998–present

Lucy Russell is an English actress. She made her debut in the film Following (1998) and has appeared in several movies since then, including Toni Erdmann.

== Career ==
She is known for starring as Grace Elliott in Éric Rohmer's L'Anglaise et le duc (English: The Lady and the Duke). In 2002 she was named as one of European films' "Shooting Stars". Her first starring role was in Christopher Nolan's Following. Since then she has appeared in numerous film and TV roles. Russell and Nolan met as fellow students at University College London, where she studied Italian. In Batman Begins, another film of Christopher Nolan, Russell portrayed a restaurant guest who spoke with Bruce Wayne about the Batman. She auditioned for and received the role of Angel's personal assistant in the 2007 film Angel. She played Michael Fassbender's sister in the film.

The short film Daisy, in which she performed the role of Sarah, won for the Best UK Short Film Award at London Independent Film Festival (2016), the Best Foreign Featurette Award at Idyllwild International Festival of Cinema (2016) and the Platinum Remi Award at World Fest Houston International Film Festival (2016). She portrayed Dee in Murmur, which was nominated for the Best Short Film Award at London Short Film Festival (2016) and the Best Acting Ensemble and Best Short Film Awards at Lift Off London Short Film Festival (2015).

She starred in the 2020 eight episode historical drama series Atlantic Crossing as Missy LeHand.

== Personal life ==
Besides English, Russell fluently speaks French and Italian, and has partial knowledge of German and Spanish languages. She participates in fencing, horse-riding, skiing and ice skating.

== Filmography ==
=== Feature films ===
Year	Title	Role	Director
1998	Following	The Blonde	Christopher Nolan
2001	Far from China	Janice	C. S. Leigh
2001	The Lady and the Duke	Grace Elliott	Éric Rohmer
2002	Nude, Descending...	Cora	C. S. Leigh (2)
2003	I Am David	American Woman	Paul Feig
2004	Pour le plaisir	Eve, the lawyer	Dominique Deruddere
2004	L'Ennemi naturel	Tanguy's ex-wife	Pierre Erwan Guillaume
2004	Red Rose	Jean Armour	Robbie Moffat
2005	Batman Begins	Female Restaurant Guest	Christopher Nolan (2)
2006	Tristan & Isolde	Edyth	Kevin Reynolds
2007	Angel	Nora Howe-Nevinson	François Ozon
2008	Cass	TV Presenter	Jon S. Baird
2009	The Imaginarium of Doctor Parnassus	Classy Shopper 3	Terry Gilliam
2011	10 Arenas of Marwood	Dr. De Hory	Michael Audreson
2012	Sightseers	Lynne Marshall	Ben Wheatley
2013	Cal	Cath Miller	Christian Martin
2013	World War Z	UN Delegate	Marc Forster
2013	I'm Still Here	Rebecca Lawrence	Kris Smith
2016	Toni Erdmann	Steph	Maren Ade
2018	Where Hands Touch	Teacher	Amma Asante
2019	Judy	Publicist	Rupert Goold
2020	Rebecca	Mrs. Clementine Whitney	Ben Wheatley (2)
2021	Without Remorse	CIA Director Sarah Dillard	Stefano Sollima
2024	Blitz	Volunteer	Steve McQueen
2026	Ink	Muriel McKay	Danny Boyle

=== Short films ===
Year	Title	Role	Director
2001	Left Turn	Julie	Sean Ellis
2008	Out There	Caroline	Edward McGown
2011	Zalika	Lisa	Corinne Kempa
2013	One Day in Hell	Anne Gates	Timothy Hart
2013	Falling and Loud Noises	The Doctor	Marisa Freyer
2014	Ashes to Ashes	Reader of Poem	Aurora Fearnley
2014	Das Tor zur Welt	The English Lady	Delia Gyger
2015	Boom Bang A Bang	Mavis	Ashwin Arvind
2015	Murmur	Dee	Aurora Fearnley (2)
2016	Daisy	Sarah	Nancy Paton
2020	Cognition	Consul EA	Ravi Ajit Chopra
2024	Housewarming	Mum	Liam White

=== Television ===
Year	Title	Role(s)	Notes
2002	Rescue Me	Doctor	Episode: "#1.2"
2003	Red Cap	Capt. Emily Garnett	Episode: "Cold War"
2003	Murphy's Law	Jenny Collins	Episode: "Kiss and Tell"
2003	Cambridge Spies	Aileen Furse	Episode: "#1.4"
2005	Midsomer Murders	Felicity Turner	Episode: "Hidden Depths"
2006	Avenger	Curtis	Television film
2007	Clapham Junction	Miss Richards	Television film
2007	Forgiven	Family Lawyer	Television film
2008	Moving Wallpaper	Sally	Episode: "1.5"
2008	10 Days to War	Dr. Heather McDonald	Episode: "Our Business Is North"
2008	He Kills Coppers	Conference Facilitator	Miniseries
2009	10 Minute Tales	Chicken Team Leader	Episode: "Syncing"
2009; 2012; 2016	Doctors	Liz White; Hilary Adams; Bea Ward	Episode: "Teotwawki"; Episode: "Pants on Fire"; Episode: "Rock-a-Bye Baby"
2010	Combat Kids	Gill	Miniseries; 3 episodes
2012	Casualty	Anna O'Shaunessy	Episode: "When Love Breaks Down"
2013	Call the Midwife	Mrs. Clarke	Episode: "2.5"
2015	Wolf Hall	Lady Anne Shelton	Episode: "Master of Phantoms"
2015	The Syndicate	Melissa Mitchell	3 episodes
2015	Cuffs	Mrs. Pryce	Episode: "Drastic Action"
2017	The Crown	Lady Mountbatten	3 episodes
2017; 2018	Genius	Frau Pauline Winteler; Madeleine Renoult-Gilot	Einstein: 3 episodes Picasso: 3 episodes
2018	Vera	Susan Wakeland	Episode: "Black Ice"
2018	Kiri	Margaret	Episode: "#1.3"
2019	Brexit: The Uncivil War	Elizabeth Denham	Television film
2019	Chernobyl	Marina Gruzinskaya	Episode: "Please Remain Calm"
2019	Dark Money	Mrs. James, headteacher	Miniseries; 2 episodes
2019	Top Boy	Julia Barnes	Episode: "Press Gang"
2019	Doc Martin	Dr. Emma Ryder	Episode: "Equilibrium"
2020	Strike Back	Dr. Helen McCluskey	Episode: "Vendetta: Part 1"
2020	Trigonometry	Frances	Episode: "Coming Out"
2020	The Letter for the King	Eloise	Miniseries; 6 episodes
2020	Happy Epidemic	Joanna	Episode: "Therapy"
2020	Roadkill	Sian Prebble	Episode: "#1.4"
2020	Atlantic Crossing	Marguerite LeHand	Miniseries; 8 episodes
2021	The Irregulars	Duchess	Episode: "The Ghosts of 221B"
2021	The Girlfriend Experience	Winston	3 episodes
2021	The Remote Office	Catherine Rowe	Miniseries; 5 episodes
2021	Brassic	Lady Beverly	Episode: "3.7"
2021	The Girl Before	Rachel	Miniseries, 2 episodes
2022	This Is Going to Hurt	Serena	Episode: "1.6"
2022	Trigger Point	Moira Bloxham	3 episodes
2022	Andor	Supervisor Grandi	4 episodes
2022	A Spy Among Friends	Jane Sissmore	Miniseries; 5 episodes
2024	3 Body Problem	Sally	Episode: "Judgment Day"
2024	Eat, Love, London	Harriet Joseph	Television film
2024	Wolf Hall: The Mirror and the Light	Lady Anne Shelton	Episode: "Wreckage"
2024	The Day of the Jackal	Marjorie Marshall	2 episodes
2024	Dune: Prophecy	Gbangbala Truthsayer	3 episodes
2025	The Hack	Tessa Jowell	Episode: "1.5"

=== Podcasts ===
Year	Title	Role(s)	Notes
2013	Doctor Who: The Monthly Adventures	Trellak / Thief / DDC-GTU-159	Episode: The Seeds of War
