= The Magnificent Six and 1/2 =

British children's comedy film series (1968–1972)

The Magnificent Six and 1/2 is a British comedy film series for the Children's Film Foundation. Based on Hal Roach's popular Our Gang series of shorts, "Six and 1/2" followed a group of seven children on their fun misadventures. Created by Harry Booth and Roy Simpson, the series ran in cinemas from 1968 to 1972, with three series and eighteen half-hour episodes in all. Following the first two series, Booth and Simpson decided to bring their children's series to television, eventually creating a very similar series called Here Come the Double Deckers!. The final "Six and 1/2" series was produced by a different company and featured an entirely new group of children in the cast.

== Series One (1968) ==
The first series of The Magnificent Six and 1/2 starred Len Jones as the group's leader, Steve, Brinsley Forde as prankster Toby, Suzanne Togni as tomboy Liz, Ian Ellis as rather large Dumbo, Michael Audreson as the clever Whizz, Lionel Hawkes as the always hungry Stodger, and Kim Tallmadge as tag-a-long Peewee (the "1/2" in the serial's title). In the first episode, "Ghosts and Ghoulies", the rest of the gang meet Whizz and his little sister Peewee for the first time. Whizz and Peewee are allowed to join the gang if they spend the night in a haunted house. Produced by Century Films with Roy Simpson and directed by Harry Booth, the series debuted in February 1968.

=== Episodes ===
- Ghosts and Ghoulies (The gang initiate new members Whizz and Peewee by having him spend the night in a haunted house.)
- When Knights Were Bold (The kids find a suit of armor, which Dumbo tries on, and quickly gets stuck in.)
- Billy the Kid (The gang are involved with a mischievous goat which turns out to be a missing regimental mascot.)
- Kontiki Kids (The gang build a raft to ferry them across a canal, with just one problem: actually getting the raft to the canal)
- Bob-a-Job (The gang help in the collections for a youth club.)
- Peewee's Pianola (The kids find a pianola, and try to bring it to junkyard owner Old Tom. But when it runs away, with Peewee trapped inside of it, nothing but chaos ensues.)

=== Cast ===
- Len Jones as Steve
- Ian Ellis as Dumbo
- Brinsley Forde as Toby
- Suzanne Togni as Liz
- Lionel Hawkes as Stodger
- Kim Tallmadge as Peewee
- Michael Audreson as Whizz
- Reg Lye as Angry houseowner

== Series Two (1969) ==
The second series was very similar to the first series, with the only noticeable difference being a small change in the cast. Len Jones was unavailable at the time, resulting in Robin Davies taking over for the part of "Steve". Brinsley Forde was absent from a few of the episodes (A Good Deed in Time and The Astronoughts), though his name still appeared in the closing credits. This would be the last series to feature the original characters. The series premiered in August 1969.

=== Episodes ===
- Peewee Had A Little Ape (Toby tries on a dummy ape skin and is mistaken for a real ape which has escaped from a circus.)
- A Good Deed in Time (The gang try to be helpful, but practically every deed they partake in involves borrowing a ladder from a decorator, who attempts to climb out of the window, not realising that his ladder has gone!)
- The Magician (At Peewee's birthday party Marvo the Magician loses Stodger in his special cabinet and then disappears himself. But Stodger materialises wherever there is any food.)
- A Lad in the Lamp (An unscrupulous ice-cream vendor steals an old lamp from the gang, but Whizz has fixed a walkie-talkie inside the lamp and the vendor gets more than he bargained for.)
- It's Not Cricket (The gang's cricket ball is confiscated by an angry man who throws it on to a passing lorry. The kids try to retrieve the ball at a local construction site, causing their usual share of havoc along the way.)
- The Astronoughts (Whizz converts an old boiler into a spaceship. However a scrap metal dealer has already bought it and hauls it away by crane with the Gang inside. Naturally enough, they believe they are in outer space.)

=== Cast ===
- Robin Davies as Steve
- Ian Ellis as Dumbo
- Brinsley Forde as Toby
- Michael Audreson as Whizz
- Lionel Hawkes as Stodger
- Suzanne Togni as Liz
- Kim Tallmadge as Peewee

== Series Three (1972) ==
The final series was produced by a different company, Lion Pacesetter, and directed by Peter Graham Scott. A completely different cast was brought in, as well as a mostly new set of characters (the one exception being the character Liz). Despite being different characters from the previous two series, the new group of kids had individual personalities very similar to those of their predecessors. The cast consisted of Paul Griffiths as the group's leader, Andy, Jody Lynn Schaller as Genie, the group's resident genius, Kay Skinner as chubby Podge, James C. Baxter as Larry, Robert Richardson as Sam, Jane Coster as Liz (a character used in the two previous series), and Steven Wallen as tag-a-long Scruff.

=== Episodes ===
- That's All We Need (The kids decide to erect an old hut as headquarters for an "Adventure Playground" on some local wasteland, not realizing that a demolition gang is moving in to clear the derelict houses surrounding it. The children inadvertently help themselves to the demolition gang's tools, sections of prefabricated huts and various useful materials. Adventure and chaos follow and ends with Andy and the gang the happy possessors of a shining new hut.)
- Up The Creek (The gang are given an unseaworthy boat which they convert into a super-fast craft. The unscrupulous boatyard owner who gave it to them bullies them into exchanging it, but chaos results and the joke is on him.)
- Up for the Cup (The gang, as supporters of their local football team, are upset when they are denied entrance to the championship game because the tickets are sold out. Observing the game from a tree situated over a private garden inadvertently sets off a chain of rather frantic and, ultimately, disastrous results.)
- The Ski Wheelers (When old Mr Brown gives the gang some skis, they resolve the problem of the lack of snow by fixing the skis to roller skates. Havoc results, but it's the two nasty louts who steal the skis who are arrested by the police.)
- Time Flies (The gang goes on a map reading exercise. Lost near a tower haunted by the ghost of a drowned seafarer, the compass direction that the ghost gives them leads them through havoc-ful lanes, restaurants, and a deep freeze plant.)
- Five Survive (The gang genuinely believe they have helped a farmer -even though he has been bad-tempered with them and does not deserve help- by rounding up what they suppose to be his stray cows.)

=== Cast ===
- Paul Griffiths as Andy
- Jody Lynn Schaller as Genie
- Kay Skinner as Podge
- James C. Baxter as Larry
- Robert Richardson as Sam
- Jane Coster as Liz
- Steven Wallen as Scruff

== Here Come the Double Deckers! ==
Around 1969, Magnificent Six and 1/2 creators Harry Booth and Roy Simpson decided to bring their series to television. The two pitched the idea to the British Broadcasting Corporation, who wound up turning down the series. Eventually, American studio 20th Century Fox agreed to produce the series, which eventually became known as Here Come the Double Deckers!. The series had a very similar format to its predecessor, following the adventures of seven children (with very similar personalities to the "Six and 1/2" group) who used a double decker bus as their clubhouse. However, unlike "Six and 1/2", the television series was produced on a much higher budget, and often contained musical numbers.

20th Century Fox wanted a completely different cast for the television series, rather than the same cast from the "Six and 1/2" series, but nevertheless, both Brinsley Forde and Michael Audreson starred in the series. The Double Deckers made its American premiere on 12 September 1970, and its United Kingdom premiere on 8 January 1971. The series lasted a total of seventeen episodes.

== Later showings ==
Six of the shorts were syndicated to television as part of CBS Children's Film Festival. Three of the shorts were shown as part of this series in 1969, and three more in 1973. Among the films shown were "Ghosts and Ghoulies", "When Knights Were Bold" and "Peewee's Pianola".

The first two series were syndicated to television in West Germany beginning on 8 November 1970. In Germany, the series was known as Sechs Wilde und ein Krümel.

In 1987, Cineplex-Odeon Home Video and MCA edited together all of the shorts from the first series into a feature film, The Adventures of the Magnificent Six and 1/2. They released the feature on VHS in Canada in 1989.

In 2002, eight of the shorts were released as bonus features on a series of four DVDs, known as Saturday Morning Pictures. These DVDs were dedicated to the Children's Film Foundation, and each release consisted of two CFF feature films and two Six and 1/2 shorts (two of the DVDs also featured promotional trailers for the Children's Film Foundation, one of which featured a clip from "Kontiki Kids". These releases were also offered on VHS, although the Six and 1/2 shorts were not included. Volume 1 featured "Ghosts and Ghoulies" and "Kontiki Kids", Volume 2 featured "Bob a Job" and "Peewee's Pianola", Volume 3 featured "The Astronaughts" and "A Good Deed in Time", and Volume 4 featured "It's Not Cricket" and "Peewee Had A Little Ape".

== See also ==
- Children's Film Foundation
