= The Lady and the Duke =

2001 film by Éric Rohmer

- Theatrical release poster
- French: L'Anglaise et le Duc
- Directed by: Éric Rohmer
- Screenplay by: Éric Rohmer
- Based on: Ma vie sous la révolution by Grace Elliott
- Produced by: Françoise Etchegaray
- Starring: Jean-Claude Dreyfus; Lucy Russell
- Cinematography: Diane Baratier
- Edited by: Mary Stephen
- Music by: Jean-Claude Valero
- Production companies: Pathé Image Production; Compagnie Éric Rohmer; France 3 Cinéma; KC Medien
- Distributed by: Pathé Distribution (France); Tobis (Germany)
- Release dates: 7 September 2001 (Venice); 7 September 2001 (France)
- Running time: 129 minutes
- Countries: France; Germany
- Language: French
- Budget: €6 million ($7.1 million)
- Box office: $1.1 million

The Lady and the Duke (French: L'Anglaise et le Duc, lit. 'The Englishwoman and the Duke') is a 2001 historical, dystopian, and romantic drama film, set during the Reign of Terror. It was written and directed by French New Wave filmmaker Éric Rohmer, and adapted from the memoirs Ma vie sous la révolution (Journal of My Life During the French Revolution) by Grace Elliott.

According to a description of the film in The Guardian, Rohmer's "customary verbal sparring and complex intellectual arguments are spiced by lavish sets, suspenseful plotting and the continuous threat of violence."

== Plot ==
Grace Elliott, a Scottish courtesan and the former mistress to both the Prince Regent and the Duke of Orléans, finds herself living in an increasingly dystopian and Orwellian Paris following the French Revolution. As her outspokenly Royalist beliefs place her friendship increasingly at risk with the pro-Jacobin Duke, Elliott decides during the September Massacres to aid the escape of condemned political prisoner Marquis de Champcenetz, the former governor of Tuileries Palace, at great personal risk. She also seeks to convince her former lover to take a public moral stand in the National Assembly against Robespierre and the escalation of the Reign of Terror.

== Cast ==
- Jean-Claude Dreyfus as Duke of Orléans
- Lucy Russell as Grace Elliott
- Alain Libolt as Duke of Biron
- Charlotte Véry as Pulcherie the Cook
- Rosette as Franchette
- Léonard Cobiant as Champcenetz
- François Marthouret as Dumouriez
- Caroline Morin as Nanon
- Marie Rivière as Madame Laurent
- Héléna Dubiel as Madame Meyler
- François-Marie Banier as Robespierre

== Reception ==
The film received praise for its use of digital technology to recreate 18th-century Paris, but was also attacked in France for its graphic violence and harsh criticism of revolutionary terror and some even accused the film of being aristocratic propaganda. Asked about this, Lucy Russell remarked: "There does seem to be a great problem, not just in France, but every country has problems facing up to the nasty parts of its history. But there's a reason it was called the Terror."
