= Big Up (album) =

1997 album by Aswad

Studio album by Aswad
- Released: 16 September 1997
- Studio: Eastcote Studios, London, England; HC&F Recording Studio, New York, NY; Matrix Studios
- Genre: Reggae
- Length: 54:20
- Label: Gut
- Producer: Aswad

Aswad chronology
Rise and Shine (1994)	Big Up (1997)	Roots Revival (1999)

Professional ratings
Review scores
Source	Rating
AllMusic	3/5 stars

Big Up is a studio album by British reggae band Aswad, released in 1997 through Gut Records. The album was bestowed with a Grammy nomination in the category of Best Reggae Album.

== Critical reception ==
Allmusic praised the album saying "Aswad continues to draw on its roots influence and expand its sound on BIG UP with dancehall rhythms and rich vocal harmonies."

== Track listing ==
No.	Title	Length
1.	"One Shot Chilla feat. UK Apache"	3:52
2.	"Danger In Your Eyes"	3:49
3.	"Runaway"	3:48
4.	"Roxanne"	3:38
5.	"Lay This On You"	5:12
6.	"If I Was"	3:37
7.	"Push"	5:07
8.	"Ring It"	4:17
9.	"Babe"	5:02
10.	"Get a Grip"	3:57
11.	"Hurry Love"	4:48
12.	"What I Know"	3:54
13.	"Without Love"	4:46
14.	"Golden Bay"	3:51
Total length:		54:20
