= Grace Elliott =

Scottish socialite, courtesan and memoirist

Grace Dalrymple Elliott
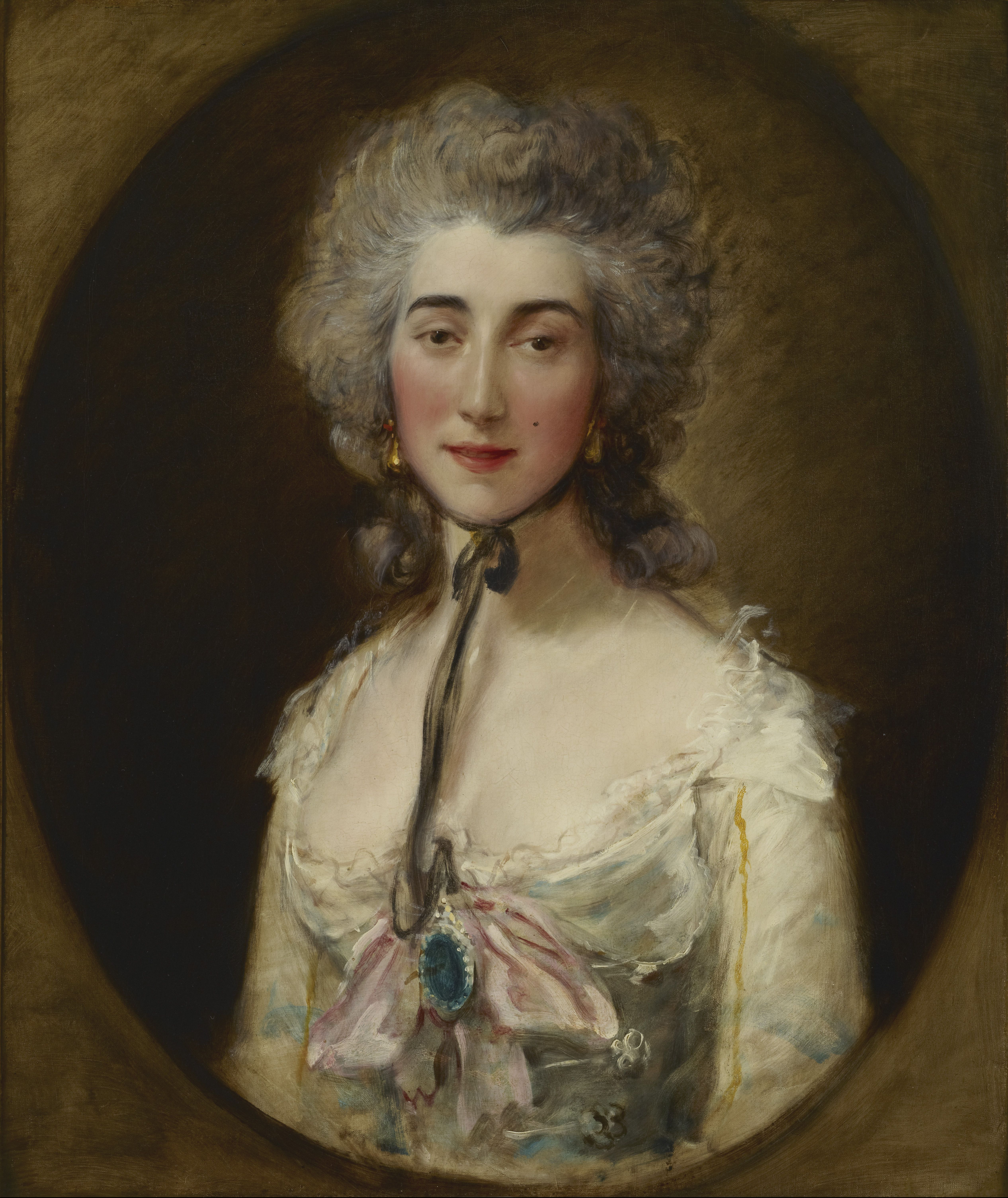
- Portrait by Thomas Gainsborough, c. 1778
- Born: Grace Dalrymple c. 1754; Edinburgh, Scotland
- Died: 16 May 1823 (aged 68–69); Ville d'Avray, France
- Burial place: Père Lachaise Cemetery, Paris
- Occupations: Writer, courtesan, spy
- Known for: mistress of the Louis Philippe II, Duke of Orléans
- Notable work: Journal of my life during the French Revolution
- Spouse: Sir John Eliot (divorced)
- Children: Georgina Seymour
- Parent(s): Grisel Craw (mother); Hew Dalrymple (father)

Grace Dalrymple Elliott (c. 1754 – 16 May 1823) was a Scottish courtesan, writer and spy resident in Paris during the French Revolution. She was an eyewitness to events detailed in her memoirs, Journal of my life during the French Revolution (Ma Vie sous la Révolution) published posthumously in 1859. She was mistress, first to the future George IV, by whom she is said to have borne an illegitimate daughter, and then to the Duke of Orléans. Elliott trafficked correspondence and helped condemned Royalists and members of the French nobility escape from the French First Republic during the Reign of Terror. She was arrested several times but managed to avoid the guillotine, and was released following the military coup that ended the Terror and resulted in the execution of Robespierre.

In the acclaimed but widely controversial 2001 film adaptation of her memoirs by French New Wave director Éric Rohmer as The Lady and the Duke, Grace Elliot was played by English actress Lucy Russell.

== Early life ==
Elliott was born probably in Edinburgh about 1754, the youngest daughter of Grissel Brown (died 30 September 1767) and Hew Dalrymple (died 1774), an Edinburgh advocate concerned in the great Douglas case. Her parents separated around the time of her birth, and she was most likely brought up at her grandparents' house.

She was educated in a French convent, and on her return to Scotland, was introduced by her father into Edinburgh society. Her beauty made such an impression on John Eliot, a prominent and wealthy physician, that he made her an offer of marriage in 1771. She accepted, although Eliot was about 18 years her senior. They were married on 19 October 1771 in London, when she was 17. The couple entered fashionable society, but eventually grew apart due to their difference in age and interests. In 1774 Elliott met and fell in love with Lord Valentia, with whom she entered into an affair. Convinced of his wife's infidelity, John Eliot had the couple followed and eventually sued Valentia for criminal conversation (adultery). He received £12,000 in damages before successfully obtaining a divorce.

With her social reputation destroyed, Elliott became recognised as a member of the demimonde and was forced to earn her living as a professional mistress or courtesan. She was then taken by her brother to a French convent, but she seems to have been brought back almost immediately by Lord Cholmondeley, who became her lover and remained one of her principal protectors throughout her life.

== Life in England ==
Having met Lord Cholmondeley at the Pantheon in 1776, she began a liaison with him that lasted three years. Their friends included the courtesans Gertrude Mahon and Kitty Frederick. Thomas Gainsborough painted two portraits of her in 1778, which are in the Frick Collection and the Metropolitan Museum of Art. In 1782, she had a short, concealed intrigue with the Prince of Wales (afterwards George IV) and gave birth to a daughter on 30 March 1782, who was baptised at St Marylebone as Georgiana Augusta Frederica Seymour (d. 1813) but used the name Georgina Seymour.

Elliott declared that the Prince was the father of her child and The Morning Post stated in January 1782 that he admitted responsibility. However, the child was dark in complexion, and when she was first shown to the Prince, he is said to have remarked, "To convince me that this is my girl they must first prove that black is white."

The Prince and many others regarded Lord Cholmondeley as the father of the girl, although the Prince's friends said that Charles William Wyndham (brother of Lord Egremont), whom she was thought to resemble, claimed paternity. Yet others thought she might have been fathered by George Selwyn. Lord Cholmondeley brought up the girl, and after her early death in 1813, looked after her only child.

== Life in France: French Revolution ==
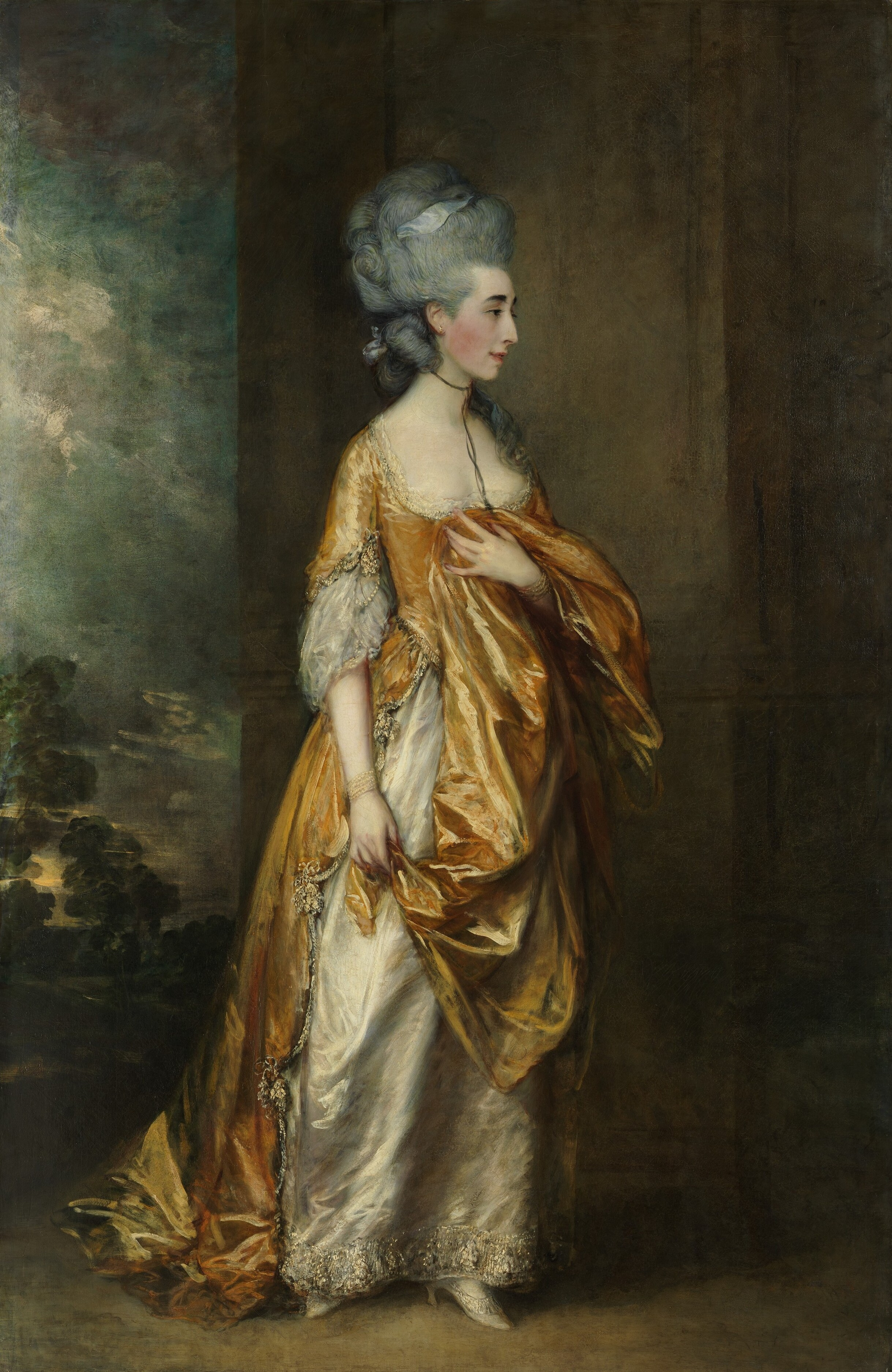
Grace Elliott (1754?–1823). Portrait by Thomas Gainsborough, 1778. (In the Metropolitan Museum of Art)

George, Prince of Wales, introduced her to the French Duke of Orleans in 1784 and by 1786, she had permanently set up residence in Paris and become one of Orleans' recognised mistresses. In exchange for her companionship, the Duke granted her a home on the Rue Miromesnil and a property in Meudon, to the south of Paris. During this period Elliott also pursued liaisons with the Duke de Fitz-James and the Prince of Conde.

Much of what is known about Elliott's life in France is recorded in her memoirs, Journal of my life during the French Revolution (Richard Bentley, 1859). Although there are a number of inconsistencies in her account, her work has become one of the best-known English-language accounts of The Terror, documenting the movements of the Duke of Orleans and those within his aristocratic Jacobin circle at the Palais-Royal. During her life in Paris, Elliott witnessed the horror of the September massacres and the body of the Princess de Lamballe carried through the streets. Although Elliott was an associate of the Duke of Orleans (who later took the name Philippe Égalité), her royalist sympathies soon became widely known throughout her district, and her home was frequently searched. It has been recently shown that Elliott was trafficking correspondence on behalf of the British government and assisting in the transportation of messages between Paris and members of the exiled French court in Coblenz and in Belgium.

Elliott risked her life several times to assist and hide aristocrats pursued by the Revolutionary government. Shortly after the Assault on the Tuileries Palace, on 10 August 1792, Elliott hid the injured Marquis de Champcentz by physically carrying him to her house on the Rue Miromesnil at great risk. During a search of her home, she placed him between the mattresses of her bed and feigned illness. On another occasion, Elliott agreed to take in and hide at her home in Meudon Madame de Périgord and her two children, who were attempting to flee to England. She helped to arrange false travel documents for several people wishing to escape the Revolution. After hiding Champcentz in the attic of her home in Meudon, she managed to fix his passage out of France. In the spring of 1793, however, she was arrested and imprisoned and spent the rest of the Terror in prisons, including the Recollets and the Carmes, where she claims to have met Joséphine de Beauharnais, although this has been questioned by historians. Her writings detail her harrowing prison experiences, the violent coercion she experienced, and the illness and deprivation endured by her fellow prisoners.

== Later life ==
Although many of her friends met their deaths, including Madame du Barry, Elliott did not. She narrowly avoided death and was released after the Reign of Terror came to an end, not before she had been confined in a total of four different prisons by the Republican government. In later years, there were rumours that she had an attachment with Napoleon Bonaparte, but had rejected his offer of marriage. She died a wealthy woman at Ville d'Avray, in present-day Hauts-de-Seine, in May 1823, while a lodger with the commune's mayor.

She was buried in Père Lachaise Cemetery.

== Works ==
- Elliott, Grace Dalrymple (2011) [1859], During the Reign of Terror: Journal of my Life during the French Revolution, Cover Art, Roy Niswanger, ISBN 9781230200811

== Depictions in film and literature ==
A dramatic portrayal of part of her life is contained in Eric Rohmer's 2001 historical drama and dystopian film The Lady and the Duke. English actress Lucy Russell played Elliott and Jean-Claude Dreyfus played the Duke of Orleans. The film received praise for its use of digital technology to recreate 18th-century Paris, but was also attacked in France for its graphic violence and harsh criticism of revolutionary terror and some even accused the film of being aristocratic propaganda. When asked about the controversy, lead actress Lucy Russell replied: "There does seem to be a great problem, not just in France, but every country has problems facing up to the nasty parts of its history. But there's a reason it was called the Terror."

Grace Elliott also appears as a major character in Hallie Rubenhold's novel The French Lesson (Doubleday, 2016).
