= The Universality of the French Language =

The Universality of the French Language (French: Discours sur l'universalité de la langue française) is a 1784 essay by Antoine de Rivarol. He began his discourse by tracing a brief history of the origins of French language, claiming that the Roman conquest and the invasion of the Franks in Gaul contributed to the emergence of a linguistic hierarchy, at the top of which stood Latin. However, the contact between Latin and the idioms spoken by the “barbarian” population generated the vulgarisation of classical Latin, namely a multitude of patois dialects. The writer also highlighted the two major languages which divided French territories: the Picard language, spoken in the north, and Provençal, the language of the south. Although pre-eminence was given to the northern language, Rivarol regarded the northern pronunciation as “a little bit thud” and regretted the eclipse of the southern language, which he qualified as full of sounds “that would have conferred to French more splendor”. Afterwards, Rivarol examined the causes of the universality of the French language.

The discovery of the Americas, the passage to India, the invention of the printing press, the development of the trade market and the progress in science gave to Europe supremacy over the world. By consequence, relations between European powers felt the necessity of a common language. In his essay, Rivarol showcased the dominant languages ruling the European continent, and demonstrated why they could not supersede the French language.

On June 3, 1784, Rivarol was awarded the Berlin Academy Prize for the essay.

== German ==
Rivarol began his critique with the language of Goethe. He blamed the German people for having denied their own language during the 16th century. The French essayist declared that the inferior position of German with regard to Latin was explained by the fact that the Prussian empire had never been unified under the same crown. Another argument criticised the difficulty of German syntax that appeared to be an obstacle to the learning of this language. In addition, the glottal pronunciation, as well as the Fraktur script “shocked people of the south”. Rivarol even dared to express in front of the Berlin Academy the revolting feelings that people from Latin origins associated with northern languages. Nevertheless, he mitigated his statements by describing the German language as “too rich and too hard at the same time”. He praised German literature for giving the world poets and writers of genius. However, as Germany fell behind its neighbours in terms of art and literature, its language faced difficulties in finding a privileged place at the international level. The German language projects an image of “antique and modest” people, too conventional and sedentary. Rivarol finished his critique on Germany by pointing out another argument against a possible development of the German language: the blind tolerance and the warm welcome that the Academy presented to foreign idioms.

== Spanish ==
The second language to be criticized by Rivarol was the Spanish language. This language from Castile had lost its power and its charm from the era of Charles V with the collapse of the Spanish Empire. In the period following the golden age of Spanish literature, “Castilian had no longer that Moorish gallantry that charmed Europe, and the national genius became darker”. Rivarol did not deny the importance that Spanish had in the metropolis of Europe. As it was spoken at the royal courts and in theatres, the genius of literary works by Miguel de Cervantes and Lope de Vega were praised throughout Europe. The Spain of the 18th century concealed “its poverty under the magnificence of the Spanish language and national pride”. Paradoxically, after having expressed his admiration for Castilian, Rivarol reproached the language for being redundant. He also depicted Spanish pronunciation as pompous.

== Italian ==
When it came to his ancestral country, Antoine de Rivarol's discourse veered to a more solemn tone. In fact, he did not hesitate to dedicate five or six pages of eulogy on the “centre of the world for so many centuries”. It is interesting to notice that Rivarol profoundly regretted the glorious times of the Roman Empire when “the only passable routes in Europe led to Rome” Consequently, the French writer asked himself why Italy did not succeed in imposing its language to the European continent. One of the main reasons that impeded the development of the Italian language lay in the papal authority. Indeed, the Roman Catholic Church always favoured Latin. Given that the Pope communicated exclusively in Latin both in written and oral speech, the dialects spoken in the regions of Italy did not manage to dethrone Latin. For centuries, the Tuscan dialect had been considered as a vulgar idiom. For that reason precisely, a lot of renowned writers, such as Dante, Petrarch or Boccaccio had long time been reluctant to write in patois. Most of the time, they published their works in Latin. In another argument, Rivarol attracted attention on the spread of Tuscan all over the Mediterranean regions. In fact, this dialect began to be spoken beyond Italian territories due to European travellers who practiced commerce activity to Asia. In addition, the Medici period culturally enriched the Italian language by means of literature and flourishing art. In the 16th century, nevertheless, the political tensions of the neighbour countries went against the expansion of Tuscan. France and Spain, immerged in warfare, did take absolutely no interest in the idea of a universal language. “The maturity of Italian was precocious”. Subsequently, Italy in its turn fell in a period of political conflicts. Invaded by Germans, by Spanish, and by French, Italy lost its authority at the expense of its adversaries. Symptomatically, the importance of the Italian language weakened.

== English ==
The last language to come under fire was English. Rivarol heaped the most virulent criticism on England. He described England as a country “under cloudy sky, isolated from the rest of the world, served as an exile for Romans” Throughout his essay, the author drew a discriminatory comparison between French and English cultures. He overtly disparaged English values at the expense of French ones. With disdainful eyes, Rivarol depicted English nation that, according to him, had no quintessential characteristics. Consequently, French mores and traditions represented a model for Europe. Regarding the thriving economy of England, the French essayist condemned British navigation judged as dangerous for the other countries. On the other hand, Rivarol fervently defended values of France that “endowed with immortal treasures, it acted against its own interests and misread its genius”. Whereas England needs everybody in order to attract potential customers, “everybody needs France”. In addition, the French pamphleteer seemed to take pleasure in comparing personalities of the two peoples. The English are portrayed as “terse and taciturn, linked to embarrassment and timidity of northern Man”. They are contrasted with the French that Rivarol described as optimistic and social individuals, who combine politeness, gallantry and grace. This unilateral defence in favour of French people dominated the essay of Antoine Rivarol. In this respect, he established a parallel between the peculiarities of a nation and virtues of its language, affirming that a rich language necessarily belonged to rich and educated people. In order to examine the case of English language and to see if it could claim the universality, Rivarol analysed English literature along with its eminent writers. The domain of literature would be the only aspect in the argument of Rivarol not to be subjected to disapproval. In fact, the writer even delivered a panegyric on the merits of English literature. He acknowledged the ingenuity of Chaucer and Spencer, describing the former as English Homer. Nevertheless, he contradicted himself few lines later: “their books did not become books of all people”. One can clearly notice the royalist tone of Rivarol while he was launching an attack against Shakespeare and Milton. He emphasised the fact that the royal court of England did not appreciate these poets judged as rustic and popular. Rivarol discredited both Milton and his poems. Conversely, poets at Charles II's court received complements from the French writer. Concerning the origins of the English language, Rivarol considered them obscure. Following the conquest of William the Conqueror, the duke of Normandy, Anglo-Saxon was assimilated to French. Both French pronunciation and the syntax had been distorted “like obelisks and statues which fell into hands of the Barbarians”.

== French ==
The last and the most important part of Rivarol's essay was devoted to the French language. Indeed, he would not cease to praise it until the end of his discourse. In this passage, Rivarol launched himself into a demonstration full of nationalist passion for the progress of the French language. He put a particular emphasis on the intrinsic values of France. He began his defence by an exaltation of the reign of Louis XIV, “true Appollo of French Parnassus, who walked down the history of human spirit, next to Augustus and Alexander the Great”.

The structure of the sentence in French is meant to be clear and faithful to the logic. As illustration, the writer cited the syntactic order in French: subject-verb-object. Speaking highly of French grammar, “what is not clear is not French”, Rivarol blamed the languages with inversions. Unlike the French syntax, which he described as “a straight line”, idioms such as Greek and Latin confused locators by leading them into a grammatical labyrinth. Due to inversion traps, Latin or Greek prose lost their clarity and accuracy. However, the only weak point that Rivarol reproached French consisted in the incompatibility with music. According to the French pamphleteer, the rigid structure of French clashed with meandering chord of musical notes. However, this constancy of the order was the reason why philosophers adopted the French language. As regards the French pronunciation, Rivarol characterised it as sweet, soft and gracious “marked by the French character”. Finally, he attempted to answer to the second question posed by the Berlin Academy, namely, why could French deserve the prerogative of the universal language. The European continent forms a remarkable diversity of kingdoms and peoples. In order to guarantee the stability of all the nations, it seemed indispensable to have a common model. In this regards, French represented the only linguistic example capable of transposing its regular order and constancy to anyone who would speak it. According to Antoine Rivarol, language is the painting of our ideas. Therefore, the choice of the French language was not only advisable but also necessary for Europe. As far as the future of French was concerned, the writer remained optimistic. According to him, the universality of French and the immortality of its literature would not hand their power to another language anytime soon. He finished his essay on notes that could appear somewhat naïve to the 21st century reader. Indeed, Rivarol named France as the country that liberated America. French, in this case is depicted as the language of Peace.

== Criticisms ==
Numerous critics reproached Rivarol for partiality in the defence of the French language in his essay, and for having based his reasoning on arguments that he himself described as delicate:

- The central position of France in Europe,
- Its political constitution,
- The genius of French writers,
- The temper of its inhabitants and
- The image that France projected to the world.

All these aspects made French a predominant tongue according to him.

Rivarol was also lambasted for having underestimated the culture of French neighbours. Scholars accused him of ignorance of northern countries, of their languages and values. Without providing any statistical data or objective evidence, Rivarol tended to generalize his statements. His nationalist and Francocentrist sensibility earned him the designation of a controversial writer.
