= Rise and Shine (Aswad album) =

1994 album by Aswad

Studio album by Aswad
- Released: 27 June 1994
- Genre: Reggae
- Length: 47:11 (w/ bonus tracks)
- Label: Bubblin'
- Producer: Aswad

Aswad chronology
| Too Wicked (1990) | Rise and Shine (1994) | Rise and Shine Again! (1995) |

Singles from Rise and Shine
- 1. "Shine" Released: 6 June 1994; 2. "Warriors" Released: 1994

Rise and Shine is a studio album by British reggae band Aswad, released in 1994 through Bubblin' Records. The album peaked at number 38 on the UK Albums Chart and at number 69 on the Dutch Album Top 100.

== Singles ==
The album spawned two singles: "Shine" and "Warrior Charge", both made it to the UK Singles Chart at No. 5 and No. 33 respectively. Its lead single, "Shine", became the group's second biggest hit after their version of "Don't Turn Around".

== Critical reception ==
Professional ratings
Review scores
| Source | Rating |
|---|---|
| AllMusic | 2/5 stars |
| Music Week | 3/5 stars |
| Select | 2/5 medals |

Andy Gill of The Independent called Rise and Shine "a return to the group's traditional strengths after the ill-judged attempt at dancehall crossover that was Too Wicked". He also declared that "the overall theme of Rise and Shine is of uplift and perseverance, the classic roots-reggae consciousness recipe applied here to less positive times."

The album was nominated for Best Reggae Album at the 37th Annual Grammy Awards.

== Track listing ==
| No. | Title | Length |
|---|---|---|
| 1. | "Day by Day" | 3:30 |
| 2. | "Shine" (Beatmasters 7" Mix) | 3:39 |
| 3. | "Fever" | 3:56 |
| 4. | "2 Makes 1" | 3:31 |
| 5. | "Warriors Charging" | 4:40 |
| 6. | "World of Confusion" | 4:04 |
| 7. | "Pickin' Up" | 3:50 |
| 8. | "Give Me a Reason" | 3:41 |
| 9. | "Deeper Than Deep" | 4:29 |
| 10. | "So Good" | 4:01 |
| 11. | "Heartbeat" | 4:24 |
| 12. | "Lay My Troubles Down" | 3:46 |

Japan bonus tracks
| No. | Title | Length |
|---|---|---|
| 13. | "Shine" | 4:15 |
| 14. | "Rhythm of Life" | 7:19 |
| Total length: | | 47:11 |

== Personnel ==
Aswad

- Angus "Drummie Zeb" Gaye – lead vocals, drums, backing vocals, programming, mixing
- Brinsley "Dan" Forde – lead vocals, guitar, backing vocals
- Dennis Anthony "Tony Gad" Robinson – lead vocals, bass, keyboards, backing vocals, programming

with:

- Paul "Jazzwad" Yebuah – drums
- Carlton Courtney "Bubblers" Ogilvie – drums, bass, keyboards, backing vocals
- Michael "Cool Walk" Martin – bass, keyboards
- Stanley "Soon Come" Andrew – guitar, backing vocals, programming
- John David Holliday – guitar, backing vocals
- Joseph Crawley "Jo" Cang – guitar, backing vocals
- Alan Glass – keyboards, programming
- Winston Rollins – horns
- Eddie "Tan Tan" Thornton – horns
- Brian Edwards – horns
- Janet Kay – backing vocals
- Viveen Wray – backing vocals
- Trevor Steel – backing vocals
- Solomon – deejay
- Anthony "Chukki Star" Williams – deejay
- Yootie General – deejay

Technical

- Peter "Mash" Morgan – programming, engineering, mixing
- James Reynolds – engineering (track 2)
- Tony Cousins – mastering

== Charts ==
| Chart (1994) | Peak position |
|---|---|
| Dutch Albums (Album Top 100) | 69 |
| UK Albums (OCC) | 38 |
| US Reggae Albums (Billboard) | 8 |

== Certifications ==
Certifications and sales for Rise and Shine
| Region | Certification | Certified units/sales |
|---|---|---|
| Japan (RIAJ) | Platinum | 200,000^{^} |
^{^} Shipments figures based on certification alone.
