= Roots Revival (Aswad album) =

Studio album by Aswad
- Released: 29 June 1999
- Genre: Reggae
- Length: 49:44
- Label: Ark 21 Records
- Producer: Aswad

Aswad chronology
Big Up (1997)	Roots Revival (1999)	Cool Summer Reggae (2003)

Roots Revival is a studio album by British reggae band Aswad, released in 1999 through Ark 21 Records. The album was bestowed with a Grammy nomination in the category of Best Reggae Album.

== Critical reception ==
Professional ratings
Review scores
Source	Rating
AllMusic	4/5 stars

Rick Anderson of AllMusic praised the album saying "Roots Revival is an apt title for this album...On this one the group returns to its roots with a vengeance."

== Track listing ==
No.	Title	Length
1.	"The Best Times of Our Lives"	4:10
2.	"Freedom Street"	3:03
3.	"Caution"	3:13
4.	"Boom Boom Carnival"	3:14
5.	"Follow '99"	4:14
6.	"Take It Easy"	4:55
7.	"Roots Revival"	4:24
8.	"Breakout"	3:51
9.	"Peace Truce"	3:49
10.	"My Love"	3:10
11.	"Thank You Lord"	3:46
12.	"Invisible Sun"	4:09
13.	"The Best Times of Our Lives"	3:46
Total length:		49:44
