= Hew Dalrymple (advocate) =

Captain Hew Dalrymple (sometimes spelt Hugh; 1727 – 1774) was a Scottish advocate and poet who from 1771 served as Attorney General of Grenada. He was born on 12 July 1727, the eldest surviving son of Robert Dalrymple, Writer to the Signet, and his wife Anne Kennedy. He married Grissel, daughter of Col. Robert Brown, 43rd Foot, from whom he later separated, and by whom he had two sons and two daughters: Jacintha Catherine Hesketh Dalrymple and the younger courtesan Grace Elliott.

Dalrymple graduated LLD in 1771. He was involved in the great Douglas case.

== Works ==
- Dalrymple, Hew (1759). "Woodstock Park: an Elegy". Archived from the original on 15 March 2012. – an elegy for Charles Spencer, 3rd Duke of Marlborough (1706–1758) who commanded the Raid on St Malo in 1758
- Dalrymple, Hew (1763–70). "Rodondo; or the State Jugglers". Scots Magazine. – a defence of Scotland during the Bute administration
