= Debbie Russ =

British actress and radio presenter (born 1960)

- Born: 2 August 1960 (age 65); England, UK
- Occupations: Actress, radio presenter
- Years active: 1970–1974; later broadcasting career

Debbie Russ (born 2 August 1960) is a British former child actress and radio presenter. She is best known for her role as Tiger in the children's television series Here Come the Double Deckers! (1970–1971).

== Acting career ==
Russ began her career as a child actress, gaining prominence as Tiger, the youngest member of the gang in Here Come the Double Deckers!. Following the series, she appeared in television productions including ITC Entertainment series such as The Adventurer (1972) and The Protectors (1973).

Her film appearances include Go for a Take (1973), in which she reprised her role as Tiger, and the Children's Film Foundation production The Flying Sorcerer (1974).

Russ's acting career was brief, largely confined to the early 1970s.

== Broadcasting career ==
After leaving acting, Russ later moved into broadcasting. She has worked as a newsreader on the BBC World Service and as a continuity announcer and presenter on BBC Radio 4 Extra.

== Filmography ==
Year	Title	Role	Notes
1970–1971	Here Come the Double Deckers!	Tiger	TV series
1972	The Adventurer	Debbie Pinter	TV series, 1 episode
1973	The Protectors	Vicky Standish	Episode: "Sugar and Spice"
1973	Go for a Take	Tiger	Film
1974	The Flying Sorcerer	Lady Eleanor	Film
