= Gertrude Mahon =

18th c. courtesan and actress

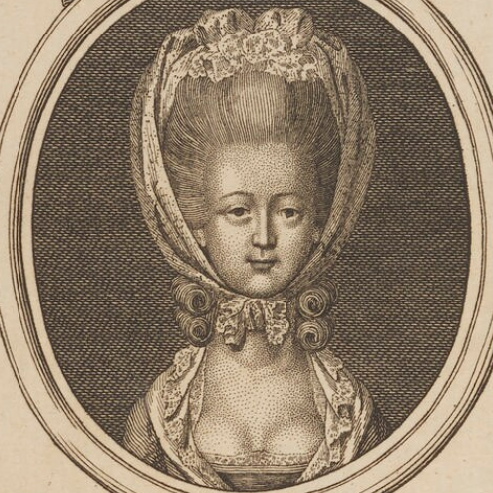
- "A Bird of Paradise"
- Born: Gertrude Tilson; 15 April 1752; Dublin, Ireland
- Died: after 1807
- Occupations: actress, courtesan
- Known for: outrageous clothes and behaviour
- Spouse: Gilbreath Mahon
- Children: one

Gertrude Mahon born Gertrude Tilson (15 April 1752 – after 1807) was a Dublin-born British courtesan and actress. She was nicknamed the "Bird of Paradise" by the press for her outrageous hats, clothes (and behaviour).

== Life ==
Mahon was born in Dublin in 1752. She was born into money; her mother was Gertrude, dowager countess of Kerry and her father James Tilson was a diplomat.

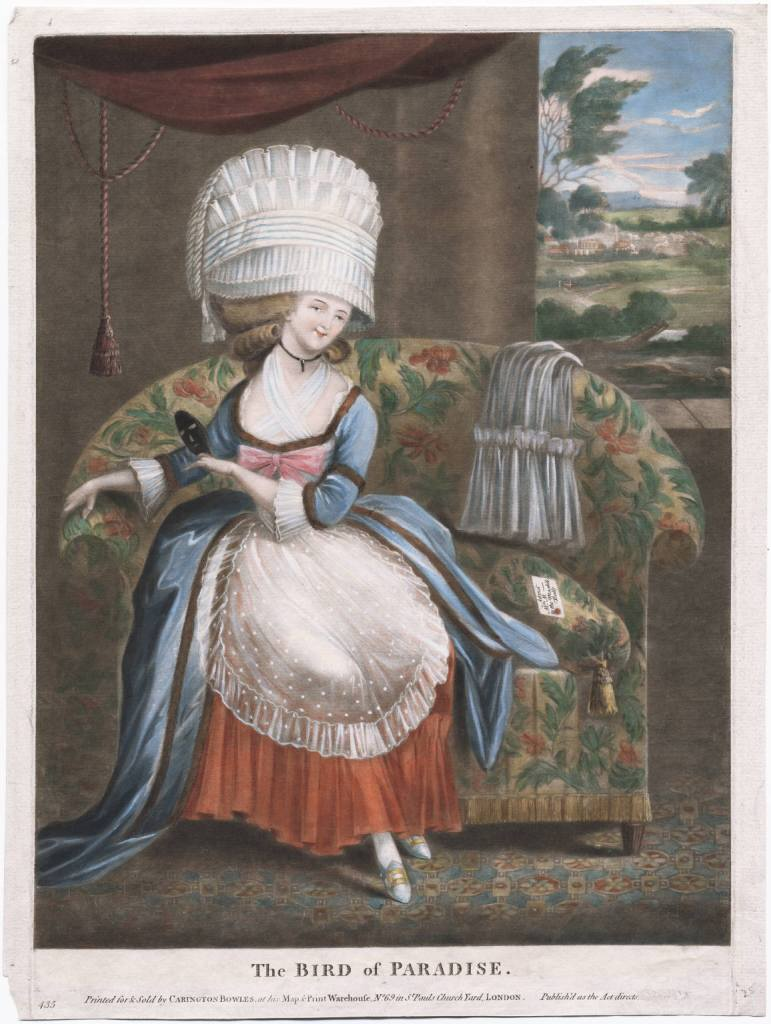
Gertrude Mahon was "The Bird of Paradise". This satirical print was from 1781.

In 1764 she became rich when her father died and left her £3,000. Frances Burney commented on how keen she was to attract a man. She attracted the attention of a gambler named Gilbreath Mahon but because she was seventeen and she lacked her mother's approval they had to go abroad. She was pregnant in 1770 and her mother allowed the couple to wed as long as it was in Britain. They married on 14 December 1770 and their son, Robert Mahon, was born in the following January. Her mother cut off the money supply, her husband deserted her and she returned to live with her mother. When her mother died she left an income to her but she left the capital to her son.

By 1776 she was notorious for her love of clothes and the men she was being seen with. She was friends with others who were disreputable including Lord Cholmondeley and the courtesans Grace Elliott and Kitty Frederick. Although her mother had hoped that her relatives would care for her, they disowned her. Her adulteries were published in the Morning Post, she was said to be pregnant, and her husband was said to have received £500 to prevent him from naming her correspondents in court.

In 1781 an engraving of her and George Bodens with the title "The Bird of Paradise and Colonel Witwou'd" and another print satirising her hats and dress were published. She was nicknamed the "Bird of Paradise" because of her brightly coloured and outrageous clothes.

Mahon appeared on the stage and despite the plays being successful her performance was considered poor. She did continue to gather interest from the public for her clothes and in particular her hats.

She was heard of in 1808 but where and when she died is unknown.
