= Go for a Take =

1972 British film by Harry Booth

- Directed by: Harry Booth
- Screenplay by: Alan Hackney
- Story by: Harry Booth; Alan Hackney
- Produced by: Roy Simpson
- Starring: Reg Varney; Norman Rossington; Sue Lloyd; Dennis Price; Julie Ege
- Cinematography: Mark McDonald
- Edited by: Archie Ludski
- Music by: Glen Mason
- Production company: a Century Films International production
- Distributed by: Fox-Rank (UK)
- Release dates: December 1972 (London, UK)
- Running time: 90 minutes
- Country: United Kingdom
- Language: English

Go for a Take (U.S. title: Double Take) is a 1972 British comedy film starring Reg Varney and Norman Rossington, directed by Harry Booth. The screenplay was by Alan Hackney.

== Plot ==
Inept waiters Wilfred Stone and Jack Foster owe money to gangster bookie Generous Jim and lose all their remaining funds on a bad bet. They go on the run, accidentally ending up in a local film studio where they get mistaken for extras and soon become involved in a succession of comic misadventures.

== Cast ==
- Reg Varney as Wilfred Stone
- Norman Rossington as Jack Foster
- Sue Lloyd as Angel Montgomery
- Dennis Price as Dracula, actor
- Julie Ege as April
- Patrick Newell as Generous Jim
- David Lodge as Graham
- Anouska Hempel as Suzi Eckmann
- Aubrey Morris as director
- Bill Fraser as TV studio doorman
- Bob Todd as security man
- Jack Haig as security man
- Melvyn Hayes as ambulance man
- John Clive as hotel waiter
- Johnny Briggs as assistant director
- John Levene as assistant director
- David Prowse as actor
- Penny Meredith as harem girl
- Debbie Russ as Tiger (reprising her role from the TV series Here Come the Double Deckers)
- Peter Stephens as director

== Production ==
The film was shot on location in central London and Slough, and at Pinewood Studios (as "Starwood Studios") with sets designed by the art director Lionel Couch.

== Music ==
The film features the song "Let's Go to the Movies", by Glen Mason and Keith Miller.

== Reception ==
=== Box office ===
The film was a box-office disappointment.

=== Critical ===
The Guardian wrote "the material is unbelievably bad."

The Monthly Film Bulletin wrote: "Beginning comparatively painlessly with a hectic car chase and one or two promising scenes at 'Starwood Studios', the latest Harry Booth comedy eventually settles down to a tedious mixture of masochism and drag, with most of the emphasis on the former. Reg Varney's cockney stoicism is not completely without charm, but the script's gags seem to consist almost entirely of a succession of violent incidents in which, for example, he has a periscope stuck up his behind or is crippled by an explosion. There is barely any attempt to generate humour from anything except pain, and even the occasional departures from this basic approach are mechanical and witless. Still, in the present state of the industry, one cannot help admiring the brazen wish-fulfilment in the film's portrayal of a thinly disguised well-known British studio, which appears to be shooting at least twelve features simultaneously."

Leslie Halliwell called the film "Painful British farce".

The Radio Times Guide to Films gave the film 1/5 stars, writing: "This British comedy has minimal laughs. Reg Varney and Norman Rossington are waiters on the run from debt collectors who take refuge in a film studio, a scenario which leads to some amazingly unfunny sequences . It's enough to make the Carry On films seem as witty as Oscar Wilde."
