= Les Actes des Apotres =

Les Actes des Apotres (English: The Acts of the Apostles) was a French royalist newspaper that was published from 1789 to 1791 during the French Revolution.

The first number of Les Actes appeared on 2 November 1789, and subsequent issues at two-day intervals thereafter. Edited by Antoine de Rivarol, its contributors included Louis de Champcenetz, Gérard de Lally-Tollendal, the Comte de Montlosier, Jean-Gabriel Peltier, and Francois Suleau.

The paper's editorial tone was variously described as satirical, cynical, and "scurrilous and obscene". The historian L. G. Wickham Legg wrote of Les Actes, "The royalist paper, indeed, is composed, not so much of comments on the events of the time, as of personal attacks directed against all who differ, even slightly, from the writers." Its authors expressed "a blind hatred for the people, and for the crowd of women who had dared to shake the pedestal of the monarchy. These men met at 'evangelical banquets'...They specialized in humorous denunciations of the patriots' 'plots', and embraced the dogma of monarchy at a time when it seemed most threatened." According to Henri Van Laun,

It was, once again, the natural French weapon in the hands of Frenchmen, satire of the most delicate kind, alternating with satire of a kind by no means delicate, irony, persifflage, innuendo, suggestion which cut and wounded to the quick, and which was more formidable, and consequently more resented, than the most outrageous invective or the most severe logic.

Occasionally the objects of the paper's scorn retaliated with violence, including an incident in which a Paris mob publicly burned copies of Les Actes as a gesture of defiance.

The paper ceased publication in October 1791. The Catholic Encyclopedia would later describe it as "the most important organ of the Royalist opposition."

Les Actes des Apotres is mentioned repeatedly in Rafael Sabatini's novel Scaramouche, where it is characterized as "the mocking organ of the Privileged party, so light-heartedly and provocatively edited by a group of gentlemen afflicted by a singular mental myopy."

== See also ==
- Journal des débats
- L'Ami du peuple
- Le Vieux Cordelier
