= François Dominique de Reynaud, Comte de Montlosier =

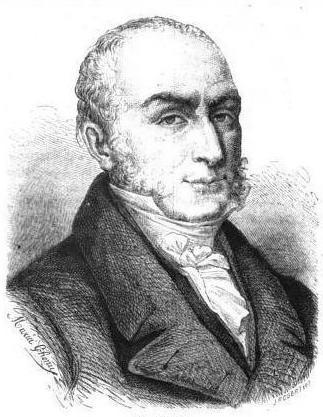
The comte de Montlosier.

François Dominique de Reynaud, Comte de Montlosier (April 16, 1755, in Clermont-Ferrand – December 9, 1838), was a notable French politician, naturalist, mesmerist, and political writer during the First French Empire, Bourbon Restoration and July Monarchy. He was the youngest of a large family belonging to the poorer nobility.

== Political activity ==
He was elected as a stand-in diplomat from the nobility of bailiwick of Clermont-Ferrand to the Estates-General, where he was a member from September 1789. He defended the French monarchy with obstinacy and talent and helped edit the French newspaper Les Actes des Apôtres.

In September 1791, after the dissolution of the Assembly, Montlosier fled to Germany where he tried to join the counter-revolutionary Army of Condé at Coblenz. After some protest concerning the liberal leanings he had shown in the Assembly, he was finally accepted.

== Exile in England ==
After the cannonade of Valmy, Montlosier withdrew to Hamburg, and thence to London, where he avoided English society, moving exclusively among the French exiles.

In his Courrier de Londres, published in London, he advocated moderation and the abandonment by the exiles of any idea of revenge. He was recalled to Paris in 1801, with permission to publish his paper in London. The Courrier was soon suppressed, nevertheless, its editor being compensated by a comfortable sinecure in the ministry of foreign affairs. Next year he sold his pen to the government to edit the violent anti-English Bulletin de Paris.

== Historical works ==
At Napoleon's request he undertook an account of the ancient monarchy of France, which should serve as a justification for the empire. After four years' labor Montlosier submitted his work to a specially appointed committee, by which it was rejected because of the stress laid on the feudal limitations of the royal authority. The work De la monarchie française . . . ou recherches sur les anciennes institutions françaises . . . et sur les causes qui ont amené la revolution . . . appeared in 1814 in three volumes, a fourth and supplementary volume in the next year containing a preface hostile to Napoleon.

His views were no more acceptable to Louis XVIII than they had been to the emperor, and he devoted himself to agriculture until he was roused by the clerical and reactionary policy of Charles X. His anti-clerical Memoire à consulter sur un système religieux, politique . . . (1826) rapidly passed through eight editions.

In 1829 he published De l'origine, de la nature, et des progrés de la puissance écclesiastique en France [On the origin, nature, and progress of ecclesiastical power in France]. In this book, Montlosier claims there were 500,000 affiliated Jesuits in France in the Chamber of Paris, in the Chamber of Deputies, at the court, in the army, in the courts, etc. He had no part in the revolution of 1830, but supported Louis Philippe's government, and entered the House of Peers in 1832. He died on December 9, 1838, at Blois. Ecclesiastical burial was denied him because he had refused to abjure his anti-clerical writings.

== Bibliography ==
- Memoires sur la revolution française, le consulat, l'empire, la restoration, et les principaux evenements qui I'ont suivie (2 vols., 1829).
