= OnMilwaukee =

Online magazine based in Milwaukee, Wisconsin

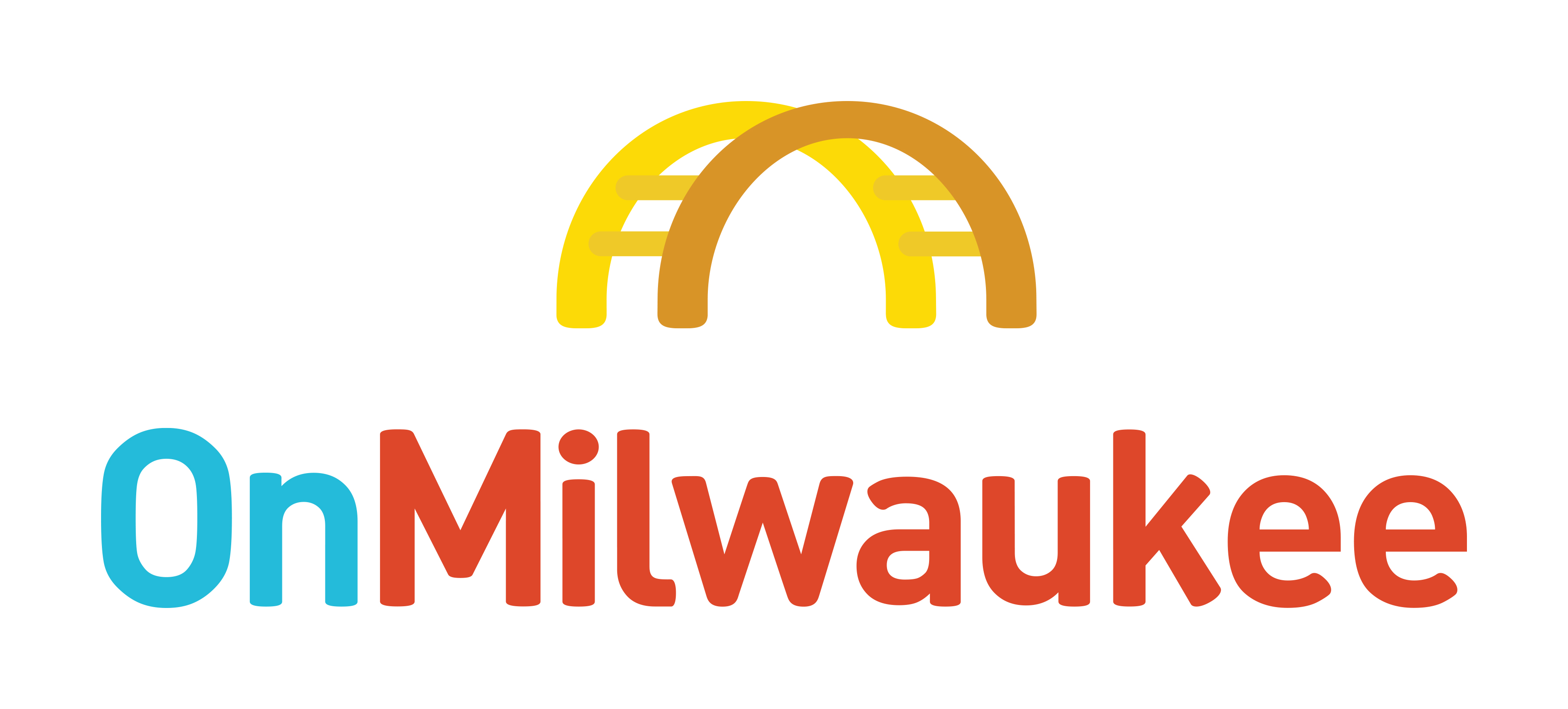
- Website type: Lifestyle/entertainment news
- Available in: English
- Creators: Andy Tarnoff, Jeff Sherman and Jon Krouse
- President: Andy Tarnoff
- Key people: Glen Ponczak; (Chief Marketing Officer); Carolynn Buser; (Chief Operations Officer); Political news
- Revenue: Approx. $3 million (2020)
- Website: www.onmilwaukee.com
- Commercial: Yes
- Launched: September 1, 1998; 28 years ago

OnMilwaukee is a digital media company and online magazine. It provides lifestyle and culture news about Milwaukee, Wisconsin. Articles on the site primarily focus on dining and entertainment, as well as daily briefs and blogs.

== Background ==
OnMilwaukee was formed by Andy Tarnoff, Jeff Sherman, and Jon Krouse in 1998. As the story goes, Jeff Sherman and Andy Tarnoff met at the Nomad Pub in early 1998. With their passion for their city, they launched OnMilwaukee.com in September that year.

The managing editor of the magazine is Bobby Tanzilo, who is also with WISN-TV (Milwaukee, WI).

== History ==
According to WISN-TV in February 2019, the magazine was looking for black history stories from African Americans in the area.

According to an article by the Milwaukee Record in December 2015, they had grown a lot since the inception. The writer of the article also questioned if Jeff Sherman and Andy Tarnoff were joking when they said they wanted to buy the Milwaukee Record.

In 2020, after being with OnMilwaukee for over twenty years, Jeff Sherman sold his interest in the media company and left the organization completely.

In January, 2024, founder Jeff Sherman joined 620 WTMJ where he launched the radio program The Upswing which focuses on the world of business, communities, and commerce in the greater Milwaukee area as well as across Wisconsin state.

== Awards ==
OnMilwaukee was the winner of the 2012, 2015, 2017, 2020, 2022, and 2023 EPPY Awards for Best Entertainment Website and Best Entertainment/Cultural News on a Website.

== Further reading and listening ==
- Milwaukee Record, December 23, 2015 - On The Record Episode 48: OnMilwaukee founders Jeff Sherman and Andy Tarnoff
