= Michael Audreson =

British actor

- Born: 1 August 1956 (age 69); England, United Kingdom
- Occupations: actor, writer, director
- Years active: 1964–2011

Michael Audreson (born 1 August 1956) is a British actor who appeared in films and television shows in the 1960s. He was in the 12-episode Children's Film Foundation series The Magnificent Six and a Half before playing the bespectacled "Brains" in Here Come the Double Deckers (1970–71). In the film Young Winston (1971) he played Winston Churchill as a schoolboy, with his voice dubbed by Simon Ward.

As the 1970s progressed, Audreson had a role in two episodes of The Tomorrow People (1978) television series.
