= Louisa Henrietta de Rivarol =

French translator

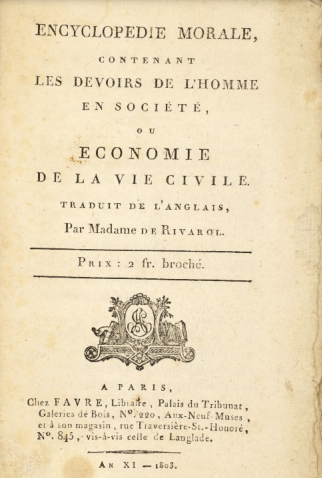
- Robert Dodsley's Encyclopedie morale translated by her
- Born: Louisa Flint; 1749; Remiremont
- Died: 1821 (aged 71–72); Paris
- Known for: translation
- Spouse: Antoine de Rivarol.
- Children: Raphael

Louisa Henrietta de Rivarol born Louisa Flint (1749 – 1821) was a French translator of Scottish descent.

== Life ==
Rivarol was born in 1749 in Remiremont. Her father, Mather Flint, was a Scot who had emigrated to France when he was eleven with his uncle George Flint. George was a well known printer and writer loyal to the Jacobite cause. He settled in Paris in 1734 and around the time of her birth and later published books about English grammar and language guides.

In 1780 she married the French writer and translator Antoine de Rivarol. He claimed to be an aristocrat. She had herself translated a number of works. She translated a Shakespearean play including some notes by Samuel Johnson. Johnson had written to her on 31 March 1769 in French to thank her for the nice things she had said about him. The play may have been the Merchant of Venice. Johnson mentioned his friend Sir Joshua Reynold and his sister. Sir Joshua Reynolds was in Paris later that year and he went to see her parents.

Antoine Rivarol abandoned her after a short relationship which resulted in the birth of a son, Raphael. To her husband's embarrassment, Lespagnier, a nurse who supported her after he abandoned her, was awarded the Montyon Prize for virtuous behavior by the Académie française. Antoine tried unsuccessfully to have the prize withdrawn but he was only able to keep his wife's name (i.e. his name) out of the report of the award.

She was held for three months during the French Revolution in 1794. She was then able to obtain a divorce from her husband, however she appears to have held no ill will. She blamed his brother and others for the failure of her marriage. Her son Raphael served with her husband. Her ex-husband died in Berlin in 1801 and she published an account to settle the confusion over her divorce. She lived on a small pension till she died in Paris in 1821.
