= Louis René Quentin de Richebourg de Champcenetz =

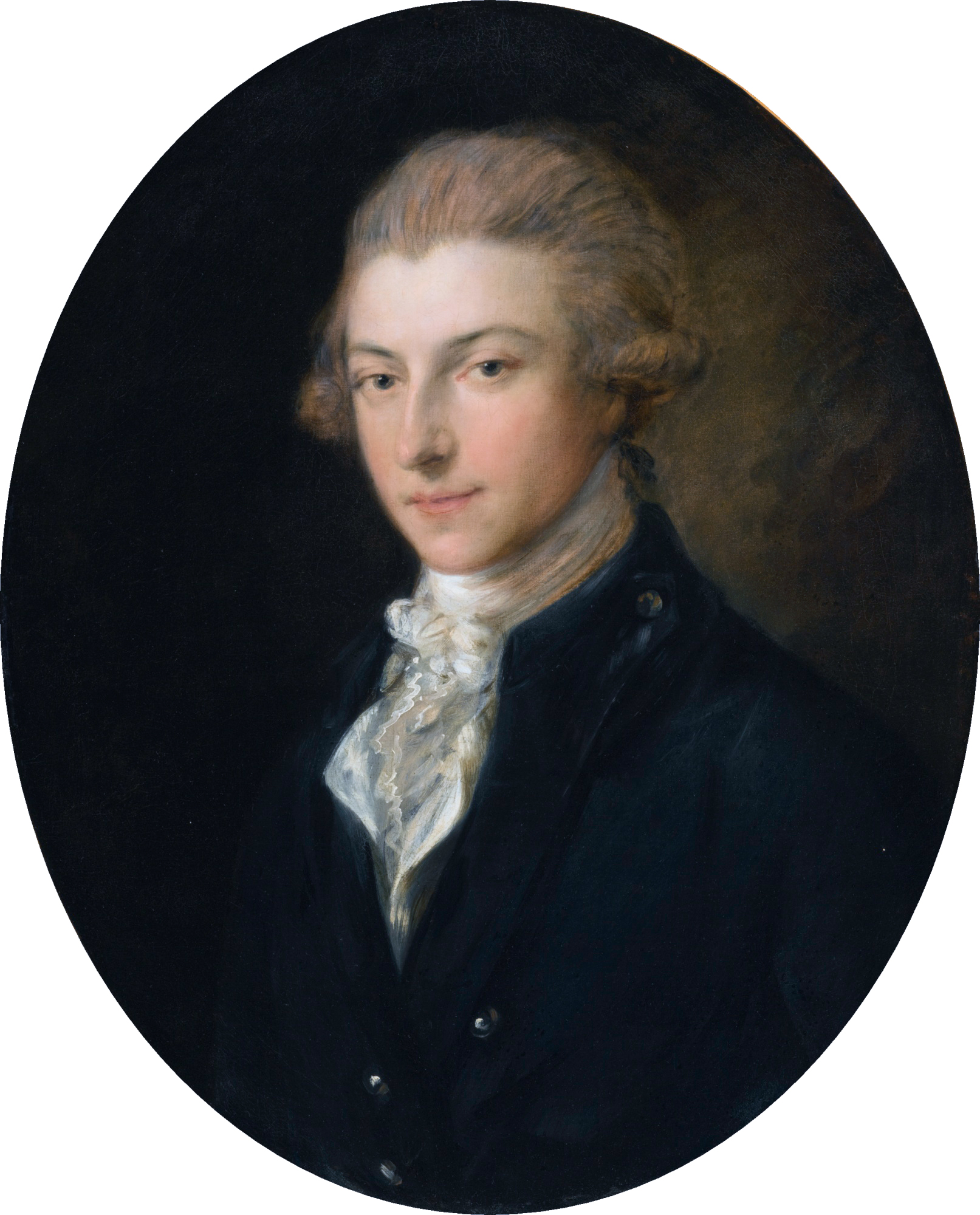
Louis-René Ferdinand Quentin de Richebourg, Chevalier de Champcenetz (Thomas Gainsborough)

Louis René Quentin de Richebourg de Champcenetz (1759, in Paris – 23 July 1794, Paris) was a French journalist guillotined for his writings.

== Life ==
Louis-René Quentin de Richebourg, known as the Chevalier de Champcenetz, was a younger son of Jean-Louis Quentin de Richebourg, the elder Marquis de Champcenetz, governor of the Tuileries Palace at the time of the French Revolution. He has frequently been confused with his elder brother Louis-Pierre, the younger Marquis.

During the Revolution, at the urging of friends concerned for his safety, he retired briefly to Meaux, but soon returned to Paris. He was tried by Fouquier-Tinville and executed in July 1794.

== Work ==
He collaborated with Rivarol and others on satirical papers including the Actes des Apôtres (1789–91), Petit Almanach de nos Grands Hommes (1788) and the Petit Dictionnaire des Grands Hommes de la Révolution (1790).

== Writings ==
- Les Gobbe-Mouches (Au Palais Royal, 1788).
- Petit traité de l'amour des femmes pour lets sots (A Bagatelle, 1788).
- Réponse aux lettres sur le caractère et les ouvrages de J. J. Rousseau: Bagatelle que vingt libraires ont refusé de faire imprimer [in response to Mme. de Staël] (A Genève, 1789).

== Sources ==
- Jean Chrétien Ferdinand Hoefer, Nouvelle Biographie générale, t. 9, Paris, Firmin-Didot, 1854, p. 187–188
- Gustave Vapereau, Dictionnaire universel des littératures, Paris, Hachette, 1876, p. 1190
