= Antoine de Rivarol =

French writer (1753–1801)

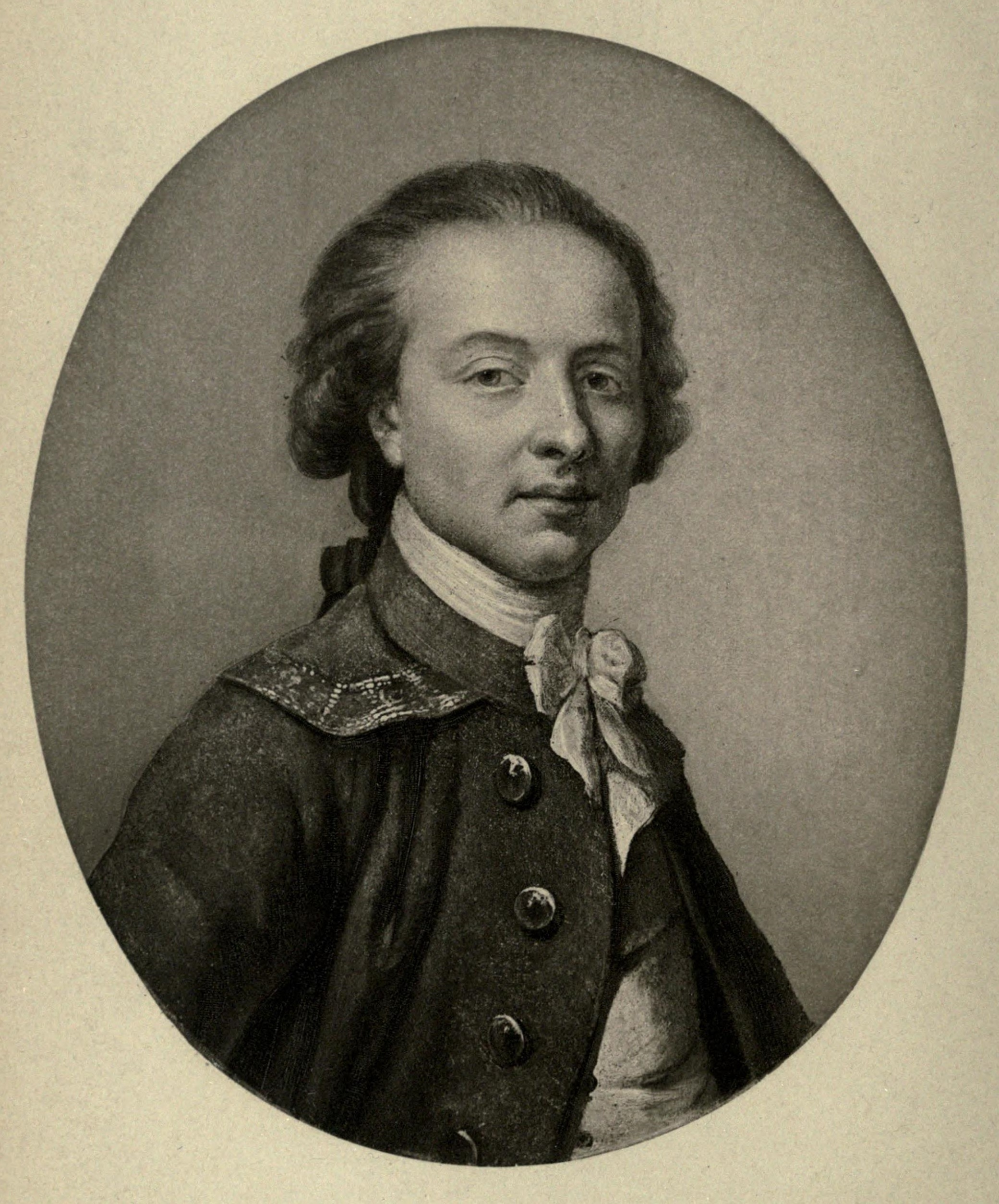
- Portrait of Antoine de Rivarol, by Melchior Wyrsch.
- Born: Antoine Rivaroli; 26 June 1753; Bagnols, Languedoc, Kingdom of France
- Died: 11 April 1801 (aged 47); Berlin, Brandenburg, Holy Roman Empire
- Occupation: Journalist

Antoine de Rivarol (26 June 1753 – 11 April 1801) was a French royalist writer and translator who lived during the Revolutionary era. He was briefly married to the translator Louisa Henrietta de Rivarol.

== Biography ==
Rivarol was born in Bagnols, Languedoc. It appears that his father, an innkeeper, was a cultivated man. The son assumed the title of comte de Rivarol, asserting a connection with the noble Italian family Riveroli, although his enemies said his name was really "Riverot" and that he was not of noble stock. He went to Paris in 1777 and won several academic prizes.

In 1780 he married Louisa Henrietta de Rivarol, a translator of Scottish descent. She had translated some works by Samuel Johnson and Johnson had become a friend of her family. Antoine Rivarol abandoned his wife after a short relationship which resulted in the birth of a son. To Rivarol's embarrassment, a nurse who supported his abandoned wife was awarded the Montyon Prize for her humanity. He was divorced in 1784.

In 1784, his Discours sur l'Universalité de la Langue Française and his translation of Dante's Inferno were favourably noted. The year before the French Revolution broke out, he and Champcenetz published a lampoon, titled Petit Almanach de nos grands hommes pour 1788, that ridiculed without pity a number of writers of proven or future talent, along with a great many nobodies.

Rivarol was the foremost journalist, commentator and epigrammatist among that faction of aristocrats which was most stalwartly conservative: he heaped scorn upon republicanism and defended the Ancien Régime.

Rivarol's writing was published in the Journal Politique of Antoine Sabatier de Castres and the Actes des Apotres of Jean Gabriel Peltier. He left France in 1792, first settling in Brussels, then moving successively to London, Hamburg, and Berlin, where he died. Rivarol's rivals in France – in sharp conversational sayings – included Alexis Piron and Nicolas Chamfort.

His brother, Claude François Rivarol (1762–1848), was also an author. His works include a novel, Isman, ou le Fatalisme (1795); a comedy, Le Véridique (1827); and the history Essai sur les Causes de la Révolution Française (1827).

He died as exile in Berlin and was interred in the Dorotheenstadt cemetery, but the site of his grave was soon forgotten.

== Works ==
- (1782). Lettre Critique sur le Poème des Jardins.
- (1783). Lettre à M. le Président de *** sur le globe Airostatique, sur les Têtes Parlantes et sur l’État Présent de l’Opinion Publique à Paris.
- (1784). De l’Universalité de la Langue Française.
- (1785). L’Enfer, Poème du Dante.
- (1787). Récit du Portier du Sieur Pierre-Augustin Caron de Beaumarchais.
- (1788). Le Petit Almanach de nos Grands Hommes.
- (1788). Première Lettre à M. Necker, sur l’Importance des Opinions Religieuses.
- (1788). Seconde Lettre à M. Necker sur la Morale.
- (1788). Le Songe d’Athalie (with Louis de Champcenetz).
- (1789). Mémoire sur la Nature et la Valeur de l’Argent.
- (1789). Le Petit Almanach de nos Grandes Femmes (with Louis de Champcenetz).
- (1789). Journal Politique-national des États-Généraux et de la Révolution de 1789.
- (1789). Adresse à MM. les Impartiaux ou Les Amis de la Paix Réunis chez Monseigneur le Duc de La Rochefoucault.
- (1790). Petit Dictionnaire des Grands Hommes de la Révolution (with Louis de Champcenetz).
- (1790). Triomphe de l’Anarchie.
- (1790). Épître de Voltaire à Mlle Raucour, actrice du Théâtre-français.
- (1790). Le Petit Almanach de nos Grands-hommes.
- (1790). Réponse à la réponse de M. de Champcenetz au sujet de l’ouvrage de madame la B. de S*** sur Rousseau.
- (1791). Essai sur la Nécessité du Mal.
- (1792). De la Vie Politique.
- (1792). Lettre à la Noblesse Française, au Moment de sa Rentrée en France sous les Ordres de M. le duc de Brunswick, Généralissime des Armées de l’Empereur et du Roi de Prusse.
- (1792). Le Petit Almanach des Grands Spectacles de Paris.
- (1793). Adresse du Peuple Belge, à S. M. l’Empereur.
- (1795). Histoire Secrète de Coblence dans la Révolution Française.
- (1797). Tableau Historique et Politique des Travaux de l’Assemblée Constituante, depuis l’Ouverture des États Généraux jusqu’après la Journée du 6 Octobre 1789.
- (1797). Discours Préliminaire du Nouveau Dictionnaire de la Langue Française.
- (1808). Œuvres Complètes, Précédées d’une Notice sur sa Vie [5 vol.].
