= Louis René Quentin de Richebourg, marquis de Champcenetz =

Marquis de Champcenetz (1723–1813)

Louis René Quentin de Richebourg, marquis de Champcenetz (1723-1813), was a French official. He was governor of the Tuileries Palace at the time of the French Revolution.

He was married three times: the third time with Albertine-Elisabeth Pater. He was the father of his namesake, the journalist Louis René Quentin de Richebourg de Champcenetz.

He was the personal enemy of the Duc d'Orleans Louis Philippe, who nevertheless enabled him to save his life at the request of Grace Elliott.
