= A New Chapter of Dub =

Remix album by Aswad
- Released: April 1982
- Studio: Fallout Shelter Studios, London
- Genre: Dub
- Length: 41:36
- Label: Island
- Producer: Aswad; Michael "Reuben" Campbell

Aswad chronology
New Chapter (1981)	A New Chapter of Dub (1982)	Not Satisfied (1982)

A New Chapter of Dub is an album by English reggae band Aswad, released by Island Records in April 1982. The record is a dub version of Aswad's previous album New Chapter (1981), and was produced by the group with Michael "Reuben" Campbell. Having felt New Chapter under-performed commercially because it was too intricate for mainstream reggae audiences (the market Aswad wanted to break first), the group conceived the dub remix album as a way of appealing to core reggae audiences. The record emphasises dub techniques like delay, echo and drop-out and was among the first British dub albums to use tape and digitally manipulated echo on a horn section. Although not a commercial success, A New Chapter of Dub received critical acclaim and has since been cited by some writers as one of the greatest dub albums of all time.

== Background and production ==
Having established themselves in the late 1970s as a key group in British reggae, the London-based Aswad left Island Records and signed to Columbia Records for their album New Chapter (1981), their first studio album since Hulet (1978). The intricately arranged album fused classic and modern reggae sounds with soul influences, and explored electronic, studio-created dub techniques which were balanced with the group's live sound, but despite receiving critical acclaim, it was under-promoted by Columbia and failed to provide the band with a commercial breakthrough. According to vocalist and guitarist Brinsley "Dan" Forde, Aswad wanted to create "something special" with the album, and believed it failed because it did not cater to the mainstream reggae market. He commented: "That's the market we've got to break first if we want to go on anywhere else."

In order to re-establish themselves on the reggae market, the group conceived the release of A New Chapter of Dub, which Bradley described as "some of the tracks that we'd already given to the sound systems." An instrumental dub version of New Chapter, A New Chapter of Dub was produced by Aswad with dub producer Michael "Reuben" Campbell. Music critic Rick Anderson believes Campbell to be an alias for noted dub producer and radio DJ Mikey Dread. Until this point, sound systems were the specific reason Aswad created dubs. Campbell mixed the record at Fallout Shelter Studios with Angus "Drummie Zeb" Gaye, drummer-vocalist for the band.

According to music critic Rick Anderson, A New Chapter of Dub incorporates traditional dub production tricks, such as delay, drop-out and echo, in ways similar to dub pioneer King Tubby, but applies the effects "in a wanton and sometimes exaggerated way" more familiar to Lee "Scratch" Perry. Among the album's key characteristics are shuddering bass and reverberated brass. The horn section was treated with echo, achieved both with tape and digital techniques. "Flikkaflame" makes heavy use of intense snare drum echoes, while "Shining Dub" incorporates heavily flanged guitar in a fashion comparable to the Black Ark. The former song, and "Zion 1", also feature harshly echoed vocals, while the softer "Truth" is driven by a hazy drum-roll beat from Dummie Zeb. Designed by Paul Smykle, the album sleeve depicts a black Saviour, holding a cross, scouring heavenly skies on a chariot dragged by four roaring lions, judging "the quick and the dead", as described by Nathaniel Samuel Murrell in the book Chanting Down Babylon: The Rastafari Reader. He describes the "remarkably striking" artwork as exemplifying how album covers are "the most visible vehicle for spreading the Rasta message in art," writing that such covers transcend the "program art" category.

== Release and reception ==
Professional ratings
Review scores
Source	Rating
AllMusic	4.5/5 stars
Encyclopedia of Popular Music	3/5 stars

Aswad resigned with Island Records for A New Chapter of Dub, who released it in April 1982. As with New Chapter, the album did not reach the UK Albums Chart, where the group did not debut until Not Satisfied later in the year. Nonetheless, the record received critical acclaim. In a positive review, Mike Hrano of the Harrow Midweek recommended the album to those disappointed by New Chapter, writing that it "exemplifies the full ferocious roar of Aswad as the lions of British reggae." He wrote that the record uses "all those larger than life, louder than loud production tricks," such as shivering bass and reverb-heavy brass, to create a "positively fearsome" record, concluding "that only the sturdiest sound systems will have the faintest hope of coping with it." Greg Tate of The Village Voice listed the album among his ten favourites records of 1982, curated as his ballot for the annual Pazz & Jop poll. A New Chapter of Dub remained available long after New Chapter fell out-of-print, although the latter was re-issued in 2002.

A New Chapter of Dub has gone on to be considered by writers to be one of the greatest dub albums; author Klive Walker notes that "it became more popular than the version with the version with the complete songs and vocals." The record also became popular among audiences who did not enjoy Aswad's vocal music. In a retrospective review, Rick Anderson of AllMusic named it the group's strongest dub album, and highlighted its innovation, saying the record "sometimes anticipated developments that would emerge as much as a decade later," in particular exemplifying the "intensified snare drum echoes" in "Flikkaflame", which he writes "anticipate effects that would become commonplace in jungle mixes of the early '90s." The Rough Guide to Reggae describes the album as taking "some of Aswad's best rhythms" and giving them "a new dimension with Michael 'Reuben' Campbell and Angus 'Drummie Zeb Gaye's inspired mixing." In a guide to dub, The Beat magazine described the "consistently interesting and varied" album to be "very worthwhile."

In 2010, Matador Network included the album in their list "Champion sounds: 50 of the world’s most heavyweight dub albums," where the editors highlight it for being "one of the first UK dub releases to use tape and digital echo on a horn section and a precursor of the subsequent explosion of 'electronic dub'." In 2018, Red Bull Music included the album in their list of "10 essential UK dub and reggae albums," having been chosen for inclusion by On-U Sound Records founder Adrian Sherwood, who commented: "The main track is an absolute horns anthem. Aswad were the standard setters really, as far as the rhythm section goes." Rob Kenner of Vibe included A New Chapter of Dub in a list of the best dub albums. Bobby Tanzilo of OnMilwaukee described the "great record", with its dominance on "bass runs that were snaky and full of finesse, but were also repeated many times," as helping him learn bass guitar. French band Dub Wiser named their debut album A New Millennium Dub (2001) in tribute to Aswad's dub album, while Walker poses Roots Manuva's Dub Come Save Me (2002) as "the new-millennium descendant" to Aswad's dub "masterpiece."

== Track listing ==
All tracks written by Aswad

=== Side one ===
1. "Dub Fire" – 4:29
2. "Flikaflame" – 4:22
3. "Truth" – 4:19
4. "Bammie Blow" – 4:08
5. "Tuffist" – 3:41

=== Side two ===
1. "Shining Dub" – 3:05
2. "Zion I" – 5:02
3. "Natural Aggression" – 6:02
4. "Ghetto in the Sky" – 6:29

== Personnel ==
Adapted from the liner notes of A New Chapter of Dub

Aswad

- Brinsley Dan – percussion, rhythm guitar, vocals, writing, production
- Tony Gad – bass, keyboards, percussion, vocals, writing, production
- Drummie Zeb – drums, mixing, percussion, vocals, writing, production

Others

- Jimmy "Senyan" Haynes – guitar
- Michael "Reuben" Campbell – mixing, production
- John Kpiaye – guitar
- Martin "Tatta" Augustine – guitar
- Clifton "Bigga" Morrison – keyboards
- Paul "Groucho" Smykle – painting
- Dennis Levi – percussion
- Michael "Bammie" Rose – saxophone
- Red Rembrandt Brothers – photography
- Vin Gordon – trombone
- Eddie "Tan Tan" Thornton – trumpet
