= Cool Summer Reggae =

Album by British band Aswad

Studio album by Aswad
- Released: 12 August 2002
- Genre: Reggae
- Label: Universal

Aswad chronology
Roots Revival (1999)	Cool Summer Reggae (2002)	Collection (2003)

Cool Summer Reggae is an album by Aswad, released in 2002. The collection features re-recordings of their hits "Don't Turn Around" and "Shine", plus cover versions of Toploader's "Dancing in the Moonlight", Gregory Issacs' "Night Nurse" and Sting's "Roxanne".

== Charts ==
Chart (2002)	Peak position
UK Albums (OCC)	54
French Albums (SNEP)	77

== Track listing ==
No.	Title	Length
1.	"Night Nurse"	3:46
2.	"Good Thing Going"	4:00
3.	"Roxxane"	3:57
4.	"Don't Turn Around"	3:21
5.	"Stir It Up"	3:23
6.	"Lifted"	3:41
7.	"Uptight"	4:23
8.	"Shine"	3:25
9.	"Would I Lie to You"	4:17
10.	"Weather with You"	3:27
11.	"Searching"	4:27
12.	"No No No"	3:33
13.	"Dancing in the Moonlight"	3:14
14.	"I Can See Clearly Now"	3:31
15.	"Shy Guy"	4:03
16.	"Smokey Blues"	3:10
17.	"Two Makes One"	3:59
