= Too Wicked =

Studio album by Aswad
- Released: 17 September 1990
- Studio: Music Works
- Genre: Reggae, dancehall
- Label: Mango
- Producer: Gussie Clarke, Aswad

Aswad chronology
Crucial Tracks (Best of Aswad) (1989)	Too Wicked (1990)	Firesticks (1993)

Too Wicked is an album by the British band Aswad, released in 1990.

The album peaked at No. 51 on the UK Albums Chart. "Next to You" was a minor radio hit in the United States.

== Production ==
The album was recorded in Kingston, Jamaica, at producer Gussie Clarke's studio; Steely & Clevie also worked on Too Wicked. It contains a cover of the Eagles' "Best of My Love". Shabba Ranks contributed vocals to "Fire".

== Critical reception ==
Professional ratings
Review scores
Source	Rating
AllMusic	2/5 stars
Calgary Herald	C+
Chicago Tribune	1.5/4 stars
The Encyclopedia of Popular Music	2/5 stars
MusicHound Rock: The Essential Album Guide	3.5/5 stars
Select	3/5 medals

Trouser Press wrote that Too Wicked pushes "towards funk, pop, soul and even dancehall, with beatbox drumming, hi-tech samples and house grooves all reeking of commercial aspirations." The Los Angeles Times deemed it "a large helping of smooth, homogenized, PG-rated reggae originals." The Province stated that "the record continues Aswad's courtship of smooth, '70s, soul-influenced reggae."

The Washington Post called the album "cluttered with redundant programmable drum loops and tacky, short, sampled sound bites, perhaps revealing the group's unsuccessful attempts to use current musical trends to 'update' its sound." The Austin American-Statesman thought that "Aswad's upscale version of reggae attempts to wed sophisticated love songs with the basic beat and generally succeeds."

The Independent considered Too Wicked an "ill-judged attempt at dancehall crossover."

== Track listing ==
No.	Title	Length
1.	"Fire"
2.	"Next to You"
3.	"Best of My Love"
4.	"Confidential"
5.	"Gotta Find a Way"
6.	"Just Can't Take It"
7.	"Dancing on My Own"
8.	"Smile"
9.	"Love Won't Leave Me"
10.	"Got to Get (To Your Loving)"
11.	"Old Fire Stick"
12.	"Hang on Baby"
