= Shine (Aswad song) =

1994 single by Aswad

Single by Aswad

from the album Rise and Shine
- B-side: "Pickin' Up"
- Released: 6 June 1994
- Genre: Reggae
- Length: 3:39
- Label: Bubblin'
- Songwriters: Aswad; Joe Cang
- Producer: Aswad

Aswad singles chronology
"Dancehall Mood" (1993)	"Shine" (1994)	"Warriors" (1994)

Music video
- "Shine" on YouTube

"Shine" is a song by British reggae group Aswad. It was written by Joe Cang and Aswad, who also produced it. Released on 6 June 1994, by Bubblin' label, in a radically remixed form courtesy of the Beatmasters, it was the first single from the group's seventeenth album, Rise and Shine (1994). The song is the band's second-biggest hit in the United Kingdom, after 1988's "Don't Turn Around", reaching number five on the UK Singles Chart. "Shine" also became a top-40 hit in several European countries, Israel and New Zealand. It was nominated in the category for Tune of the Year at the International Dance Awards 1995.

== Background and release ==
Swedish band Ace of Base's successful remake of "Don't Turn Around" as well as a remix of the song by Aswad for Ace of Base, helped reintroduce the group to the European pop audience with "Shine". Sales of some 75.000 copies of the single was achieved in its first two weeks on release in Britain. In Japan, it became a number-one airplay hit.

== Critical reception ==
James Hamilton from Music Week's RM Dance Update described the song as a "bouncy reggae bubbler".

== Music video ==
A music video was produced to accompany the song, directed by D. Red. It features the group performing on the beach, in front of local people dancing to the song. The video was a Box Top on British music television channel The Box in July 1994. Two months later, it received "break out" rotation on MTV Europe and was B-listed on Germany's VIVA. In November 1994, the video was A-listed on France's MCM.

== Track listings ==
- UK 7-inch and cassette single
1. "Shine" (Beatmasters 7-inch mix)
2. "Pickin' Up"
- UK 12-inch single

A1. "Shine" (Beatmasters 12-inch mix)
A2. "Shine" (Beatmasters 7-inch mix)
B1. "Shine" (Majorwad mix)
B2. "Pickin' Up"

- UK and Australasian CD single
1. "Shine" (Beatmasters 7-inch mix)
2. "Shine" (Beatmasters 12-inch mix)
3. "Pickin' Up"
4. "Shine" (Majorwad mix)
- Scandinavian CD single
1. "Shine" (Beatmasters 7-inch mix)
2. "Shine" (Beatmasters 12-inch mix)

== Charts ==
=== Weekly charts ===
Chart (1994)	Peak position
Austria (Ö3 Austria Top 40)	12
Belgium (Ultratop 50 Flanders)	17
Europe (Eurochart Hot 100)	16
Europe (European AC Radio)	9
Europe (European Hit Radio)	10
Finland (IFPI)	18
France (SNEP)	25
Germany (GfK)	39
Iceland (Íslenski Listinn Topp 40)	4
Ireland (IRMA)	7
Israel (Israeli Singles Chart)	16
Netherlands (Dutch Top 40)	13
Netherlands (Single Top 100)	17
New Zealand (Recorded Music NZ)	28
Scottish Singles Sales (Official Charts)	12
Sweden (Sverigetopplistan)	23
UK Singles (Official Charts)	5
UK Airplay (Music Week)	2
UK Dance (Music Week)	22
UK Club Chart (Music Week)	32

=== Year-end charts ===
Chart (1994)	Position
Europe (European Hit Radio)	39
Iceland (Íslenski Listinn Topp 40)	72
Netherlands (Dutch Top 40)	99
UK Singles (OCC)	47
UK Airplay (Music Week)	9

== Certifications ==
Region	Certification	Certified units/sales
United Kingdom (BPI)	Silver	200,000^{^}
^{^} Shipments figures based on certification alone.
