= Aswad =

British reggae group

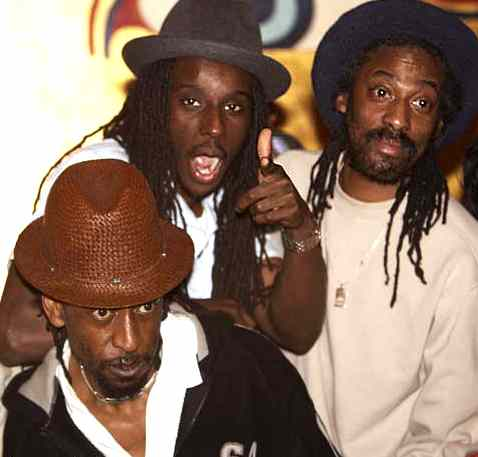
- Aswad in 2002

Background information
- Origin: London, England
- Genres: Reggae; reggae fusion; R&B
- Years active: 1975–present
- Labels: Island; Grove; CBS (UK); Simba Mesa; Ark 21; PROTV
- Members: Tony Robinson
- Past members: Brinsley Forde; Angus Gaye; Donald Griffiths; Courtney Hemmings; George Oban
- Website: Official website

Aswad are a British reggae group, noted for adding strong R&B and soul influences to the reggae sound. They have been performing since the mid-1970s, and have released 21 albums. Their UK hit singles include the number one "Don't Turn Around" (1988) and "Shine" (1994). "Aswad" is Arabic for "black". They are three-time Grammy Award nominees.

== History ==
The members of Aswad are UK descendants of immigrants from the Caribbean. They attended John Kelly/Holland Park School. Aswad was formed in 1975 in the Ladbroke Grove area of West London.

The original members of Aswad were guitarist/vocalist Brinsley "Chaka B" Forde, drummer/vocalist Angus "Drummie Zeb" Gaye, lead guitarist/vocalist Donald "Dee" Griffiths, bassist George "Ras" Oban, and keyboardist Courtney "Khaki" Hemmings. Aswad were the backing band of Burning Spear's 1977 Live album, recorded at the Rainbow Theatre in London. Other contributors included Vin Gordon, and Karl Pitterson.

Initially, the band produced music in the roots reggae vein, with members contributing songs individually and with Forde acting as the band's principal songwriter. The band's dynamic soon began to change however. Shortly after the release of their self-titled debut album in 1976, Hemmings left and was replaced by Tony "Gad" Robinson (the only time in the band's history where a departing member would be officially replaced by an incoming musician). The band then released their second studio effort, Hulet, in 1978, before George Oban ( who later played with Burning Spear and African Headcharge ) departed the band in 1979, with Robinson taking over the position of bassist as well as continuing his role as keyboardist. The following year saw Griffiths depart, leaving Forde as the band's sole guitarist. During this early period in the band's history they were distinctly different from Jamaican reggae acts, in that they wrote songs that dealt with the issues surrounding the experiences of black youths growing-up in the UK; such as "Three Babylon" and "It's Not Our Wish","Natural Progression", "Ghetto in the Sky". and the powerful jazz-influenced instrumental "Warrior Charge", which is still much played by roots reggae sound systems worldwide. The band continued making roots reggae and dub music, and in 1985, released Jah Shaka Meets Aswad in Addis Ababa Studio.

Once the band's line-up had stabilised into the trio of Forde, Gaye, and Robinson, Aswad followed a more commercial reggae style, gaining a wider audience with the New Chapter album (1981). They then followed this with the Michael Reuben Campbell-produced A New Chapter of Dub LP which was a dub of the entire New Chapter album. Clifton "Bigga" Morrison of Prince Far I's band, The Arabs, played bass on some of the tracks. Not Satisfied was a London roots-reggae album released in 1982. In August 1983, Aswad played live at Meanwhile Gardens on the Sunday of the Notting Hill Carnival; the resulting live album Live and Direct is a faithful record of that event, where they played a live dub set. "Love Fire" gained wide recognition when it was used as the backing rhythm for Dennis Brown's "Promised Land".

Among Aswad's catalogue of hits is "Don't Turn Around", a UK No. 1 hit in 1988, originally recorded by Tina Turner as a B-side to her "Typical Male" single. They followed this up with UK No. 11 hit "Give a Little Love", and a reggae-flavoured rendition of "Best of My Love", first popularised and written by The Eagles. In 1989, they contributed the single "Set Them Free" to the Greenpeace Rainbow Warriors album. In the same year, they performed together with Cliff Richard the song "Share a Dream", recorded the previous year, at Wembley Stadium as part of The Event (16 and 17 June 1989). Their next single, "Shine", was released in 1994 and was a big hit in much of Europe. Another track was the upbeat 1998 remake of The Police's "Invisible Sun", performed with Sting.

The band also hold the distinction of having played with each one of the ex-Wailers.

The band has toured extensively, playing in diverse locations from London's Royal Albert Hall and Montego Bay's Reggae Sunsplash, to gigs in West Africa, Israel and Japan.

Aswad underwent their first line-up change in sixteen years in 1996, when Forde departed the band for spiritual reasons, leaving Gaye as the only founding member. Once again, the remaining members opted not to seek to recruit a replacement musician, and thus Aswad became a duo of Gaye and Robinson. With the exception of a brief reunion with Forde in 2009 for the Island record label's 50th-anniversary celebrations, the band's line-up remained the same until Angus Gaye’s death on 2 September 2022, aged 62.

Aswad released their final studio album to date in 2009, with City Lock. They released the singles "What Is Love?" and "Do That Thing" in the same year.

Aswad toured the UK in Spring 2025, including playing at the Lambeth Country Show, at Butlins resorts, Bournemouth's Reggae Weekender, and with Ali Campbell's UB40 at Colchester Castle.

== Members ==
Current members

- Tony "Gad" Robinson - bass, keyboards, vocals (1976-present)

Former members

- Brinsley "Dan" Forde – vocals, lead & rhythm guitars (1975–1996, 2009)
- Angus "Drummie Zeb" Gaye – vocals, drums (1975–2022; his death)
- Donald "Dee" Griffiths – lead guitars (1975–1980)
- Courtney "Khaki" Hemmings – keyboards (1975–1976)
- George "Ras" Oban – bass (1975–1979)

Additional musicians

- Stanley Andrew – lead guitars, rhythm guitars, acoustic guitars, vocals
- Clifton "Bigga" Morrison – vocals, keyboards, melodica
- Martin "Tatta" Augustine – lead guitars
- John Kpiaye – guitars
- Jimmy "Senyah" Haynes – lead guitars, acoustic guitars
- Michael "Bammie" Rose – saxophone
- Vin "Trommie" Gordon – trombone
- Eddie "Tan Tan" Thornton – trumpet
- Carlton "Bubblers" Ogilvie – keyboards
- Jimmy "J-Slice" Neath – trumpet
- Paul Garred – guitars
- Michael Martin – keyboards
- Patrick Tenyue – trumpet
- Henry 'Buttons' Tenyue – trombone
- Brian Edwards – saxophone
- Trevor “T-BoNe” Jones – trombone
- Perry "Lion" Melius – drums
- Kenrick Rowe – drums
- Paul Slowley – drums

== Production work ==
- Ace of Base remix of "Don't Turn Around" (No.5 hit in the UK)
- Vanessa Mae – "Classical Gas" (#41 in UK)
- Janet Kay – "Missing You"

== See also ==
- List of reggae musicians
- John Arnison
