= Jah Kingdom =

Studio album by Burning Spear
- Released: 1991
- Recorded: 1991
- Genre: Reggae
- Label: Mango
- Producers: Winston Rodney, Nelson Miller

Burning Spear chronology
| Mek We Dweet (1990) | Jah Kingdom (1991) | The World Should Know (1993) |

Jah Kingdom is a studio album by the Jamaican musician Burning Spear, released in 1991. Burning Spear supported the album with a North American tour.

== Production ==
Jah Kingdom was produced by Winston Rodney and Nelson Miller. Burning Spear employed horns and synthesizers on the album, which was recorded with the Burning Band. The cover of the Grateful Dead's "Estimated Prophet" first appeared on the tribute album Deadicated.

== Critical reception ==
Professional ratings
Review scores
| Source | Rating |
|---|---|
| AllMusic | 4.5/5 stars |
| Boston Herald | B+ |
| Calgary Herald | C− |
| Robert Christgau | (neither) |
| The Encyclopedia of Popular Music | 3/5 stars |
| Entertainment Weekly | B+ |

Entertainment Weekly praised Rodney's "high silk voice." The Washington Post determined that, "pared down to the essentials, the arrangements generally mirror Rodney's economical phrasing, and if they're missing some of the grittiness that characterizes his singing (and some of his lyrics), at least the gloss isn't insufferably thick."

The Gazette opined that the album "is crisply produced, pleasant enough and the band is hard at work, but the singer seems disinterested." The Boston Herald noted Rodney's "ability to write politico-religious lyrics that are by turns angry and joyful, stinging and gentle."

AllMusic wrote that the band "plays with a lighter touch than what was normally heard on Spear's previous albums."

== Track listing ==
1. "Jah Kingdom"
2. "Praise Him"
3. "Come, Come"
4. "World Power"
5. "Tumble Down"
6. "Call On Jah"
7. "Should I"
8. "When Jah Call"
9. "Thank You"
10. "Land of My Birth"
11. "Estimated Prophet"

== Personnel ==
- Winston Rodney - vocals, percussion
- Nelson Miller - drums
- Paul Beckford - bass
- Lenford Richards - lead guitar, piano ("World Power"), Casio PG 380 (solo "Thank You")
- Lenval Jarrett - rhythm guitar
- Alvin Haughton - percussion
- Charles Dickey - trombone
- James Smith - trumpet (solo "Thank You")
- Mark Wilson- saxophone
- Jay Noel - keyboards

Additional musicians

- Robbie Lyn - synthesizers, piano
- Ronald "Nambo" Robinson - trombone (tracks 1,3,4,5&10)
- Junior "Chico" Chin - trumpet (tracks 1,3,4,5&10)
- Dean Fraser - saxes (tracks 1,3,4,5&10)
- Richard Johnson - piano (tracks 5,7&9)

Credits

- All songs written by Winston Rodney except track 11 (B Weir/J Barlow)
- Executive Producer - Burning Music Production
- Track 11 Produced & Arranged by Ralph Sall, originally released on Arista Records album Deadicated
- Recorded at Grove Recording Studio, Ocho Rios, Jamaica
- Recording engineer - Barry O'Hare
- Assistant engineer - Andrew Thomas
- Mixed at Platinum Island Studios, New York
- Mixed by Michael Sauvage
- Assistants - Barry O'Hare, Mervyn Williams
- Studio Assistant - Wes Naprstek
- Mastered at Masterdisk by Tony Dawsey
- Art Direction - Deborah Melian
- Front Cover Artwork - Tony Ramsay
- Photography - Chris Carroll
