= Live in Paris Zenith '88 =

Live album by Burning Spear
- Released: 1988
- Recorded: May 21, 1988
- Genre: Reggae
- Label: Slash Records
- Producer: Winston Rodney; Nelson Miller

Burning Spear chronology
Mistress Music (1988)	Live in Paris Zenith '88 (1988)	Mek We Dweet (1990)

Professional ratings
Review scores
Source	Rating
AllMusic	2/5 stars
Robert Christgau	B+
The Encyclopedia of Popular Music	3/5 stars

Live in Paris Zenith '88 is the second live album by Jamaican reggae singer Burning Spear, released in 1988.

It was nominated for a Grammy Award for Best Reggae Album at the 32nd Grammy Awards in 1990.

== Track listing ==
1. "Spear Burning"
2. "We Are Going"
3. "The Youth"
4. "New Experience"
5. "African Postman"
6. "Happy Day"
7. "Woman I Love You"
8. "Queen of The Mountain"
9. "Creation Rebel"
10. "Mistress Music"
11. "Built This City"
12. "The Wilderness"
13. "Driver"
14. "Door Peep" (only on double CD and vinyl)

Content of 2CD Reissue in 2003

CD1 :

1. "Spear Burning"
2. "We Are Going"
3. "The Youth"
4. "New Experience"
5. "African Postman"
6. "Happy Day"
7. "Woman I Love You"
8. "Travelling"

CD2 :

1. "Queen of The Mountain"
2. "Creation Rebel"
3. "Mistress Music"
4. "Built This City"
5. "The Wilderness"
6. "Driver"
7. "Door Peep"
8. "Old Marcus Garvey"
9. "Swell Headed"

== Credits ==
- All songs written by Winston Rodney
- Executive Producer – Blue Moon Productions
- Recorded in digital at the Zenith on May 19, 1990 with Mobile Studio Le Voyageur (Paris)
- Sound engineer – Andrzej (Andy) Gierus
- Assistant engineers – Rene Weiss, Pierre Allesandri and Jonathan Dee
- Mixed on 48 digital track at Marcus Studio Recording, London by Winston Rodney and Nelson Miller
- Assistant Engineer – Jonathan Dee
- Mastered by Tom Baker at Future Disc Systems, Hollywood, CA
- Art concept and design – Jon Sellers and Virginia Hodge
- Art work – Compodesign, Paris
- Photos by Jean-Bernard Sohiez
- This LP is dedicated to Florence
- Love Always To All Burning Spear Fans
- Thanks to Eric Greenspan, Winston Rodney and Nelson Miller for their trust and to Garance Production, Le Voyageur, Jeremy Jones (Marcus Studio Recording), Vu a la Tele, Duran Production, Dennis Bovell, Andy, Pascal Soalhat, Blue Moon Music and all the Burning Band.

== Musicians ==
- Winston Rodney – lead vocal and percussion
- Nelson Miller – drums
- Devon Bradshaw – bass
- Anthony Bradshaw – guitar
- Lenford Richards – lead Guitar
- Alvin Haughton – percussion
- Pamela Fleming – trumpet
- Jennifer Hill – saxophone
- Nilda Richards – trombone
- Richard Anthony Johnson – synthesizer and keyboard
