= The Fittest of the Fittest =

Studio album by Burning Spear
- Released: 1983
- Recorded: 1983
- Genre: Reggae
- Length: 35:12
- Labels: EMI, Heartbeat
- Producers: Burning Music Production; Burning Band

Burning Spear chronology
Farover (1982)	The Fittest of the Fittest (1983)	Resistance (1986)

The Fittest of the Fittest is an album by the reggae musician Burning Spear, released in 1983.

== Critical reception ==
Professional ratings
Review scores
Source	Rating
AllMusic	4/5 stars
The Encyclopedia of Popular Music	3/5 stars
The Rolling Stone Album Guide	3/5 stars

Trouser Press called the album "excellent," writing that "keyboard stabs, creative percussion and intriguing arrangements provide a solid background to his cries and moans of passion."

AllMusic called it "a superb album, which while not in the same class as Spear's first five releases, proves that the artist still has a good deal of simmer left."

== Track listing ==
All tracks composed by Winston Rodney

1. "The Fittest of the Fittest" - 3:45
2. "Fire Man" - 4:10
3. "Bad to Worst" - 3:32
4. "Repatriation" - 3:43
5. "Old Boy Garvey" - 3:45
6. "2000 Years" - 4:00
7. "For You" - 4:04
8. "In Africa" - 4:04
9. "Vision" - 4:42

== Personnel ==
Burning Band

- Winston Rodney - vocals, percussion
- Bobby Ellis - trumpet, flugelhorn
- Herman Marquis - saxophone
- Anthony Bradshaw - bass
- Nelson Miller - drums, percussion
- Michael Wilson - lead guitar, rhythm guitar
- Devon Bradshaw - rhythm guitar, lead guitar
- Anthony Johnson - keyboards

Additional musicians

- Aston "Family Man" Barrett - bass (track 3)
- Tyrone "Organ D" Downie - keyboards (track 3)
- Earl "Wire" Lindo - keyboards (track 3)
- Junior Marvin - guitar (track 3)
- David Madden - trumpet
- Glen Dacosta - saxophone
- Barry Bailey - trombone
- Calvin Cameron - trombone
- Alvin Haughton - percussion
- Winston Wright - piano, clavinet
- Bobby Kalphat - organ
- Robbie Lyn - organ

Production

- Engineered by Errol Brown
- Assistant Engineer: Chris Lewis
- Mixed by Winston Rodney and Errol Brown
- Recorded and mixed at Tuff Gong Recording Studio, Kingston, Jamaica
- Original art and design by Wicked and Wild
- Original photography by Howard Liebowitz, M.D.
- Original typography and inner bag design by Keith Breeded (Assorted Images) and The Printed Word
- Peter Ashbourne - Prophet 5
