= Pamela Fleming =

American musician

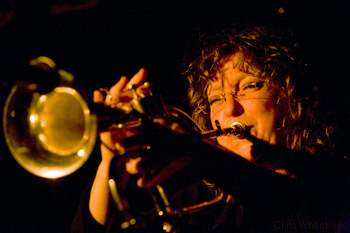

Background information
- Born: October 10, 1957 (age 68); New York City
- Origin: New York City
- Genres: Jazz, reggae, klezmer
- Occupation(s): Musician, composer
- Instrument(s): Trumpet, flugelhorn
- Years active: 1989–present
- Website: fearlessdreamer.com

Pamela Fleming (born 10 October 1957) is an American musician who composes and plays trumpet and flugelhorn. Born in New York City, her family moved to the suburb of New City, New York when she was a child. She grew up in New City and graduated from Clarkstown High School North before attending the Eastman School of Music. She graduated from Eastman in 1979 with a BM degree in music performance.

Shortly after graduating, she formed Third Wind with Paula Kimper, another Eastman alumna. She also joined the ensemble Anomy, playing trumpet, synthesizer, and spoken word. In 1985, she joined an all-female brass section The You Threes, and began playing with the reggae band Steppin' Razor, with Jenny Hill and Nilda Richards. The You Threes became The Burning Brass when they toured globally with Burning Spear from 1986-1988. In 1991, she started her own group, Fearless Dreamer. She also played with Natalie Merchant at the 1998 Lilith Fair.

Fleming is a current member of blues/folk/world fusion/jazz group Hazmat Modine, playing trumpet on their second studio album, Cicada. She also plays with Metropolitan Klezmer and their all-female side project, Isle of Klezbos. With Metropolitan Klezmer, she also plays a shofar made from a kudu horn. Since 2006, she has played with the Black Rock Coalition orchestra. She also played trumpet in the second incarnation of Isis, an all-female horn band first founded in 1972.

== Discography ==
- Burning Spear, People of the World (1986)
- Burning Spear, Mistress Music (1988)
- Burning Spear, Live in Paris Zenith '88 (1989)
- La Monte Young, The Second Dream of the High-Tension Line Stepdown Transformer from the Four Dreams of China (1991)
- Dennis Brown, Blazing (1992)
- Primordial Source, Primordial Source (1995)
- Primordial Source, Polarity (1996)
- Metropolitan Klezmer, Yiddish for Travelers (1997)
- Pucho & His Latin Soul Brothers, Mucho Pucho (1997)
- Pucho & His Latin Soul Brothers,Groovin' High (1997)
- Chris Cunningham, Stories to Play (1998)
- Fearless Dreamer, Fearless Dreamer (1998)
- Firewater, The Ponzi Scheme (1998)
- Jimmy Scott, Holding Back the Years (1998)
- Toots and the Maytals, Ska Father (1998)
- Mob Story, A Hip Hopera (2000)
- Metropolitan Klezmer, Mosaic Persuasion (2001)
- The Motives Project, So Much More (2001)
- Nepo Soteri, Mother Nature (2001)
- Rachelle Garniez, Crazy Blood (2001)
- Terry Dame's, Monkey on a Rail (2002)
- Afroditee, Sex in New York City (2003)
- Isle of Klezbos, Greetings from the Isle of Klezbos (2003)
- Metropolitan Klezmer, Surprising Finds (2003)
- Rachelle Garniez, Luckyday (2003)
- Stuffy Shmitt, Other People's Stuff (2003)
- Bossa Nova Beatniks, Moonlit Bossa (2004)
- Fearless Dreamer, Climb (2004)
- Louis Atlas, Citizen of NYC (2004)
- NYC Reggae Collective, AlieNation (2004)
- Blue Number Nine, Living It Up in the New World (2005)
- Stefanie Seskin, The Edge of Reason (2005)
- Carla Lynne Hall, Supernova (2006)
- Easy Star All-Stars, Radiodread (2006)
- Corey Harris, Zion Crossroads (2007)
- Gov't Mule, Mighty High (2007)
- Metropolitan Klezmer, Traveling Show (2007)
- Easy Star All-Stars, Until That Day (2008)
- Paprika, Pride of Brooklyn (2008)
- Dub Poet Anton, What I Do (2009)
- Easy Star All-Stars, Easy Star's Lonely Hearts Dub Band (2009)
- Angela Johnson, It's Personal (2010)
- Joseph Daley Earth Tones Ensemble, The Seven Deadly Sins (2010)
- Natalie Merchant, Leave Your Sleep (2010)
- Paprika, Are We in Rio Yet (2010)
- Easy Star All-Stars, First Light (2011)
- Hazmat Modine, Cicada (2011)
- Ananda Rasa Kirtan, Mulani Dub Kirtan (2013)
- Sean McMorris, Lo & Behold (2013)
- Angela Johnson, Naturally Me (2014)
- Isle of Klezbos, Live from Brooklyn (2014)
- Pamela Fleming's Dead Zombie Band, Rise and Dance (2014)
