= Deadicated: A Tribute to the Grateful Dead =

1991 Grateful Dead tribute album

Compilation album by Various Artists
- Released: April 23, 1991
- Genres: Country rock, Folk-rock, Rock
- Length: 74:33
- Label: Arista
- Producer: Various

Professional ratings
Review scores
Source	Rating
AllMusic	4.5/5 stars
Entertainment Weekly	B+

Deadicated: A Tribute to the Grateful Dead is a 1991 tribute album with music of the Grateful Dead performed by various artists.

The compilation was a rainforest benefit album, with significant proceeds from its sale being donated to the Rainforest Action Network and Cultural Survival.

The cover of "Bertha" by Los Lobos was released as a single and peaked at No. 24 on Billboard's Modern Rock Tracks chart and No. 37 on Billboard's Mainstream Rock Tracks chart.

Grateful Dead guitarist Jerry Garcia spoke positively of the Deadicated album in a 1991 Rolling Stone interview, in which he said "That record is full of wonderful surprises." Garcia cited the tracks by Midnight Oil, Jane's Addiction, Lyle Lovett, Suzanne Vega, and the Indigo Girls as among his favorite selections on the compilation.

== Track listing ==
No.	Performed by	Title	Written by	Length
1.	Los Lobos	"Bertha"	Jerry Garcia, Robert Hunter	5:17
2.	Bruce Hornsby and the Range	"Jack Straw"	Bob Weir, Hunter	5:51
3.	The Harshed Mellows	"U.S. Blues"	Garcia, Hunter	5:18
4.	Elvis Costello	"Ship of Fools"	Garcia, Hunter	5:20
5.	Suzanne Vega	"China Doll"	Garcia, Hunter	3:25
6.	Suzanne Vega	"Cassidy"	Weir, John Perry Barlow	3:34
7.	Dwight Yoakam	"Truckin'"	Garcia, Weir, Phil Lesh, Hunter	5:25
8.	Warren Zevon with David Lindley	"Casey Jones"	Garcia, Hunter	4:16
9.	Indigo Girls	"Uncle John's Band"	Garcia, Hunter	4:48
10.	Lyle Lovett	"Friend of the Devil"	Garcia, John Dawson, Hunter	4:14
11.	Cowboy Junkies	"To Lay Me Down"	Garcia, Hunter	5:18
12.	Midnight Oil	"Wharf Rat"	Garcia, Hunter	6:05
13.	Burning Spear	"Estimated Prophet"	Weir, Barlow	6:46
14.	Dr. John	"Deal"	Garcia, Hunter	4:17
15.	Jane's Addiction	"Ripple"	Garcia, Hunter	4:39

== Personnel ==
=== By song ===
"Bertha" (produced by Los Lobos)

- David Hidalgo – lead vocals, acoustic guitar, accordion, bass
- Cesar Rosas – electric guitar
- Conrad Lozano – bass, vocals
- Steve Berlin – organ, percussion
- Louis Perez – drums
- Victor Bisetti – percussion

"Jack Straw" (produced by Bruce Hornsby and the Range and Eddie King)

- Bruce Hornsby – piano, synthesizers, vocals
- George Marinelli Jr. – guitar, background vocals
- John Molo – drums
- John Puerta – bass, background vocals
- John J. T. Thomas – keyboards

"U. S. Blues" (produced by Ralph Sall)

- Dan Baird – throat, guitar
- Michelle Malone – throat
- Stan Lynch – gang drum, primitive ritual percussion
- Mauro Magellan – gang drum
- Mike Campbell – guitar
- Benmont Tench – piano, organ
- Brendan O'Brien – bass

These artists were credited as "The Harshed Mellows" (from the phrase "harsh my mellow", which means to be a killjoy, delivering bad news to someone who is happy/content/high). Most were members of the Georgia Satellites and Tom Petty and the Heartbreakers.

"Ship Of Fools" (produced by D.P.A. McManus and Kevin Killen)

- Elvis Costello – guitar, vocals
- Jim Keltner – drums
- Jerry Scheff – bass
- Larry Knechtel – piano
- James Burton – guitar
- Marc Ribot – banjo, horn

"China Doll" and "Cassidy" (produced by Ralph Sall)

- Suzanne Vega – vocals
- Anton Sanko – pump organ, Akai S-1000
- Marc Shulman – acoustic guitar, tiple, electric guitar
- Michael Visceglia – acoustic bass guitar
- Frank Vilardi – bodhrán, cymbals, drums, bongos
- Jeff Scantlebury – percussion

"Truckin'" (produced by Pete Anderson)

- Dwight Yoakam – lead vocals
- Tommy Funderburk – background vocals
- Pete Anderson – lead guitar
- Jeff Donavan – drums
- Skip Edwards – keyboards
- Taras Prodaniuk – bass

"Uncle John's Band" (produced by Ralph Sall)

- Amy Ray – guitar, vocals
- Emily Saliers – guitar, vocals
- Randell Kirsch – vocals
- LuAnn Kirsch – vocals
- Chris Hickey – vocals
- Dan McNamara – congas, percussion
- Barbara Marino – percussion

"Casey Jones" (produced by Ralph Sall)

- Warren Zevon – piano, vocals
- David Lindley – guitars, vocals
- Jorge Calderón – bass, vocals
- Stan Lynch – drums, percussion
- Ian McLagan – Hammond B-3 organ

"Friend of the Devil" (produced by George Massenburg, Lyle Lovett, and Billy Williams)

- Lyle Lovett – guitar, vocals
- Russell Kunkel – drums
- Leland Sklar – bass
- Dean Parks – guitars
- Bill Payne – piano

"To Lay Me Down" (produced by Michael Timmins)

- Margo Timmins – vocals
- Michael Timmins – guitar
- Peter Timmins – drums
- Alan Anton – bass
- Jeff Bird – harmonica, mandolin
- Kim Deschamps – dobro, pedal steel guitar
- Jaro Czerwinec – accordion

"Wharf Rat" (produced by Ralph Sall and Midnight Oil)

- Peter Garrett – harmonica, vocals
- Rob Hirst – drums, vocals
- Bones Hillman – bass, vocals
- Martin Rotsey – guitar
- Jim Moginie – guitar, keyboards, vocals

"Estimated Prophet" (produced by Ralph Sall)

- Winston Rodney – vocals
- Nelson Miller – drums
- Linval Jarett – piano, guitar
- Paul Beckford – bass
- Alvin Hawton – percussion
- Dave Robinson – saxophone
- James K. Smith – trumpet
- Charles Dickey – trombone
- Jay Noel – keyboards

"Deal" (produced by Ralph Sall)

- Dr. John – piano, vocals
- Freddy Staehle – drums
- Rafael Cruz – percussion
- Wilbur Bascomb – bass
- Joe Caro – guitar
- Lew Soloff – trumpet
- Andrew Snitzer – tenor saxophone
- Ronnie Cuber – baritone saxophone

"Ripple" (produced by Ralph Sall and Perry Farrell)

- Perry Farrell – vocals
- Dave Navarro – guitars
- Stephen Perkins – drums, percussion
- Eric Avery – bass

=== Album production ===
- Executive producer, concept – Ralph Sall
- A&R – Roy Lott
- Booklet design – Ann Petter
- Illustration – MIKIO, William Giese
- Tree bark photo – W. Cody, Westlight
- Engineers – Dusty Wakeman, Eddie King, Peter Doell, Leslie Jones, Ray Blair, Kevin Killen, Steve Lyon, Nick Addison, Clif Norrell, George Massenburg, Bob Doidge, Thom Cadley, Lee Anthony, Michel Sauvage, Junior Edwards, S. Morris, C. Gopie, Michael Scalcione, Tim Leitner, Patrick Dillette, Joe Gibb
- Mixing – Ralph Sall, Ray Blair, Steve Addabbo, Anton Sanko, David Leonard, Brian Foxworthy, Noel Hazen, George Massenburg, Cowboy Junkies, Bob Doidge, Michel Sauvage
