= Mistress Music =

Studio album by Burning Spear
- Released: 1988
- Recorded: 1988
- Genre: Reggae
- Length: 37:36
- Label: Slash

Burning Spear chronology
People of the World (1986)	Mistress Music (1988)	Mek We Dweet (1990)

Mistress Music is an album by the Jamaican musician Burning Spear, released in 1988 by Slash Records. It was produced by Burning Spear and Nelson Miller. Burning Spear supported the album with a North American tour.

== Critical reception ==
Professional ratings
Review scores
Source	Rating
AllMusic	3/5 stars
Robert Christgau	B
The Encyclopedia of Popular Music	2/5 stars

The Gazette wrote that "Mistress Music seems to be a logical step in a process by which Spear is trying to make his music more accessible without making more than minor concessions to commercialism."

== Track listing ==
1. "Tell the Children"
2. "Leader"
3. "Woman, I Love You"
4. "One Way"
5. "Negril"
6. "Mistress Music"
7. "Love Garvey"
8. "Tell Me, Tell Me"
9. "Say You Are in Love"
10. "Fly Me to the Moon"

== Personnel ==
- Burning Spear - vocals, harmony
- Devon Bradshaw - bass
- Nelson Miller - drums
- Anthony Bradshaw - guitar, harmony
- Lenford Richards - lead guitar
- Alvin Haughton - percussion
- Jennifer Hill - saxophone ("Love Garvey" and "Say You Are In Love")
- Pamela Fleming - trumpet ("Love Garvey," "Say You Are In Love," and solo on "Fly Me To The Moon")
- Nilda Richards - trombone ("Love Garvey" and "Say You Are In Love")

Additional musicians

- Robbie Lyn - synthesizers, piano
- Dean Fraser - saxophone
- Ronald "Nambo" Robinson - trombone
- Junior "Chico" Chin - trumpet
- Michael Sauvage - piano ("Mistress Music")

Credits

- All Songs Written By Winston Rodney
- Published By Burning Spear Publishing PRS
- Executive Producer - A Burning Music Production 18 Hill Street, St. Ann's Bay
- Recorded At - Tuff Gong Recording Studios, Kingston, Jamaica
- Recording Engineer - Gary Sutherland
- Mixed At - Sound Ideas Studio, New York
- Mixing Engineers - Michael Sauvage and Mervyn Williams
- Assistant - Joe Pirrera
- Mastered By - Brian Gardner and Matt Wallace at Grundman Mastering, Los Angeles
- Photography - Lendon Flanagan
- Illustration - Oscar Moreno
