= The World Should Know =

The World Should Know may refer to:

- The World Should Know (Burning Spear album), 1993
- The World Should Know (Couse and the Impossible album), 2005
