= Hazmat Modine =

American world jazz blues band

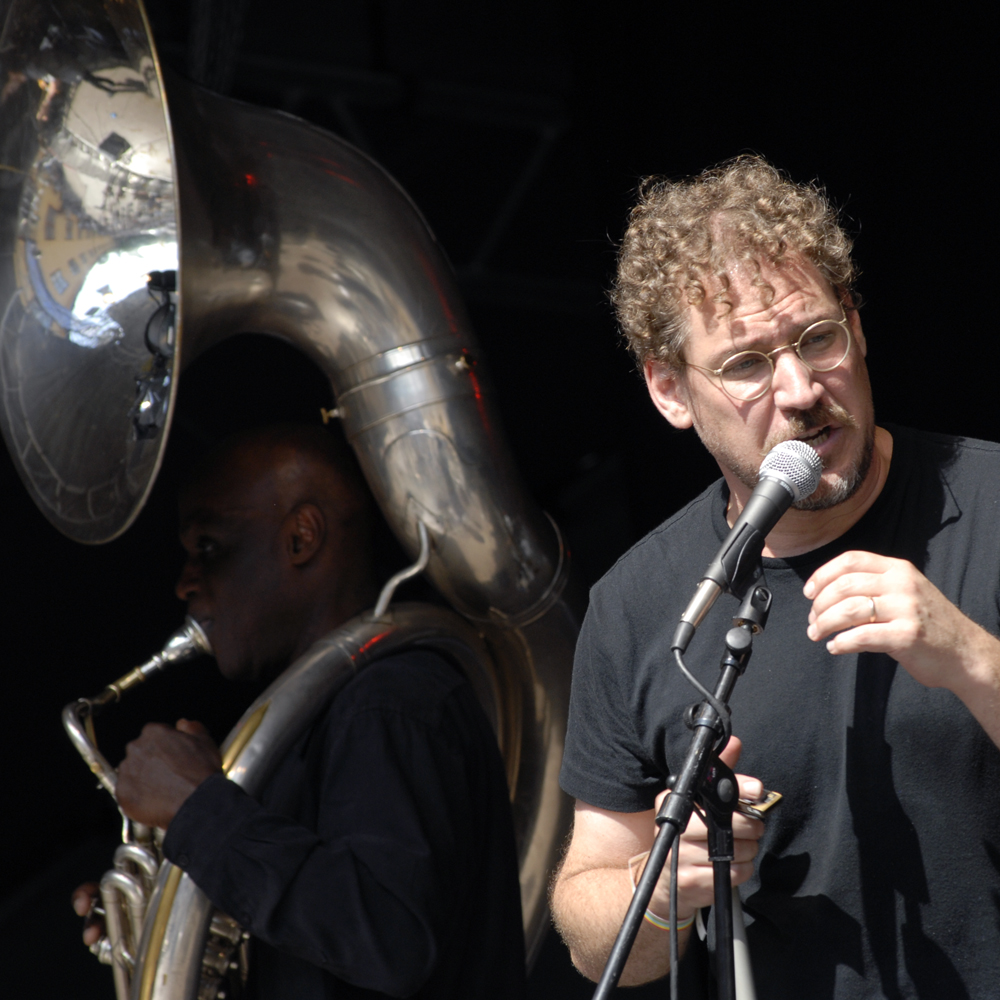
Singer Wade Schuman of Hazmat Modine performing at Stockholm JazzFest09, with sousaphone player Joe Daly (left)

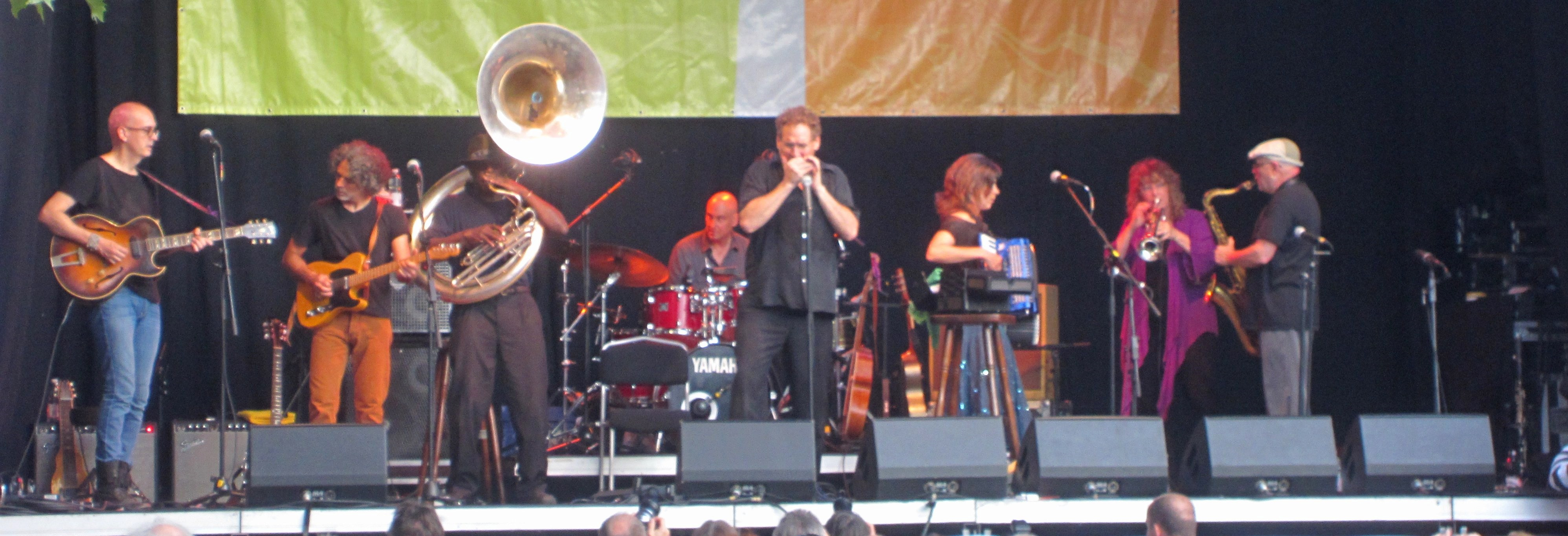
Hazmat Modine performing in Stuttgart, 2013

Hazmat Modine is a musical group based in New York City and led by singer/songwriter and multi-instrumentalist Wade Schuman. Their music is rooted in blues and also touches on folk, jazz and World music. The most recent lineup of the band circa 2024 features harmonica, tuba, trumpet, saxophone, trombone, drums, banjo and guitar, and violin. As well as solo and harmony vocals.

The band's name is a portmanteau of "hazmat," a shortening of "hazardous material", and "Modine", a brand of heater.

== History ==
Founded in the late 1990s by songwriter Wade Schuman (vocals and harmonica, occasional guitar and other instruments), the band in their formative years also featured mainstays Joe Daley (tuba, sousaphone) and Randy Weinstein (harmonica). Other personnel varied considerably, including not only performers on guitar, drums and sax but also exotic oddities like cimbalom and bass marimba.

Their debut album was recorded over a five-year span and earned positive critical notice. Hazmat Modine was featured on the National Public Radio program "All Things Considered" on October 25, 2006, and on the Australian Broadcasting Corporation program "The Daily Planet" on May 29, 2006.

Their second Hazmat Modine album featured a more stable lineup, though Weinstein has parted ways with the band.

In 2013 Wade Schuman enlisted his friend Erik Della Penna to join the band as a guitarist, co-vocalist and songwriter. Schuman wanted the band to evolve into one that had more vocal harmonies; he was becoming more interested in the long tradition of American songwriting by the likes of Irving Berlin, Fats Waller, Doc Pomus, Hays & Porter. A live album followed in 2014, and a studio album in 2015.

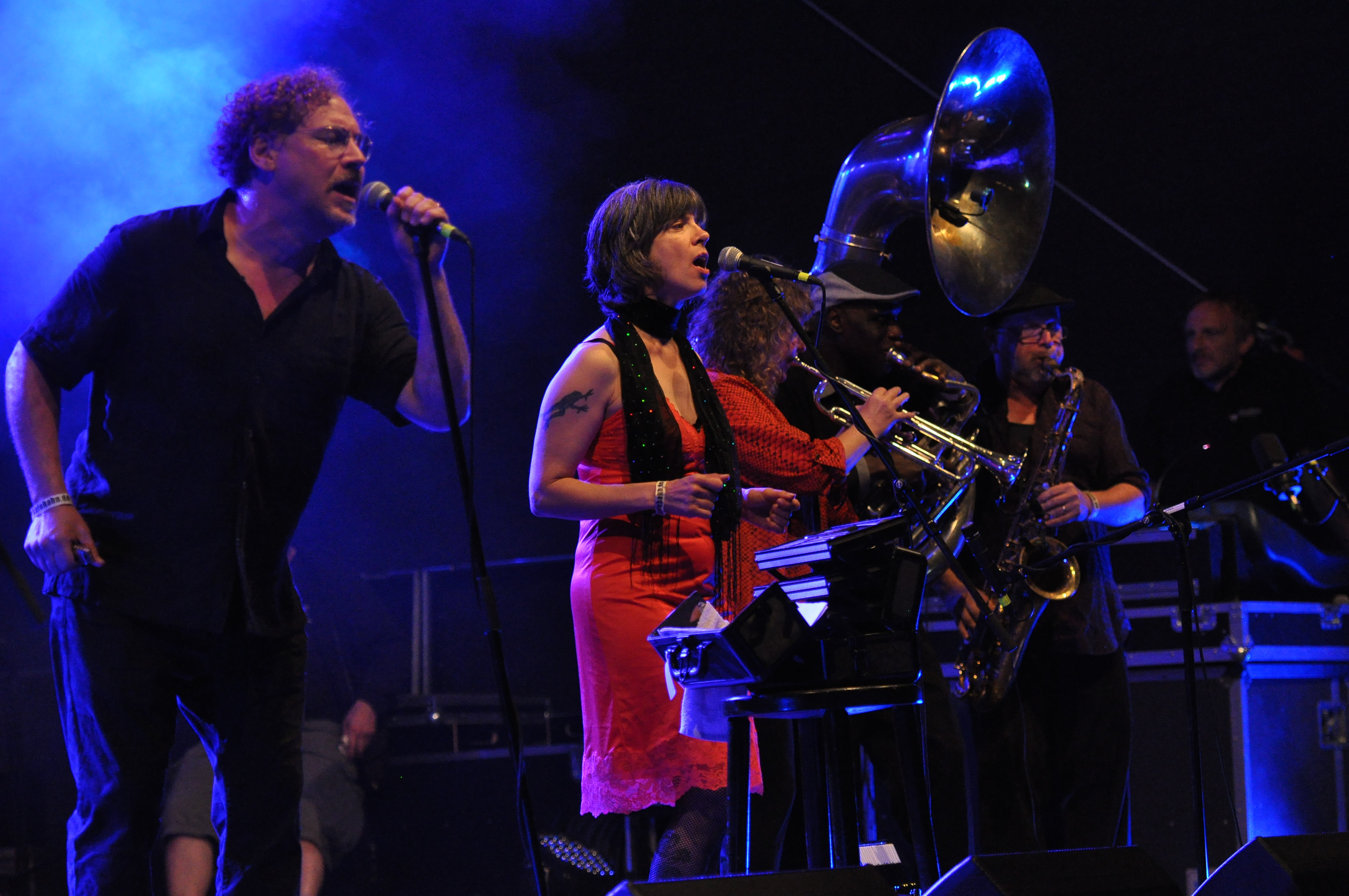
Hazmat Modine performing in Koblenz, 2014

Hazmat Modine has collaborated with Huun-Huur-Tu and Alash, both bands from Kyzl Tuva in Central Asia, Natalie Merchant, Kronos Quartet, Gangbe Brass Band from Benin, and Balla Kouyate from Mali.

== Critical reception ==
The band's first album, titled Bahamut and released in the US on the Barbès Records label, peaked at #12 on Billboard's "Top Blues Albums" chart.

Reviewing the album for Allmusic, Jeff Tamarkin gave it four stars out of a possible five, and termed it a "stunning debut". Tamarkin praised the band for successfully fusing styles as disparate as blues, jazz, calypso, and ska into "music that sounds at once ageless and primeval, authentically indigenous and inexplicably otherworldly, familiar and unlike anything else." He also praised the group for making "listener-friendly music" that doesn't "require a degree in ethnomusicology to enjoy".

Pitchfork Media reviewer Joe Tangari gave the album's track "Everybody Loves You", a collaboration with Tuvan throat singers Huun-Huur-Tu, a four-star review. Characterizing it as "generalized roots music that takes from pretty much any roots it sees fit," he praised it as "true world music, weird and wonderful to the last note."

== Members ==
- Wade Schuman: Diatonic harmonica and lead vocals, guitar, pan flute, songwriting
- Erik Della Penna: Guitars, banjo guitar, vocals, songwriting
- Pamela Fleming: Trumpet, flugelhorn
- Steve Elson: Tenor saxophone, duduk, contra alto clarinet, flute
- Reut Regev: Trombone
- Varun Das: Drums
- Daisy Castro: Violin

== Past or intermittent members ==
- Joseph Daley: Tuba, sousaphone
- Patrick Simard: Drums
- Bill Barrett: Harmonica
- Scott Veenstra: Drums
- Randy Weinstein - Harmonica
- Pete Smith: Guitar
- Richard Livingston Huntley: drums
- Henry Bogdan: Lap Steel guitar
- Michaela Gomez: Guitar, Lap Steel
- Graham Hawthorne: Drums
- Rachelle Garniez: Vocals, Accordion
- Tim Keiper: Drums
- Kevin Garcia: Drums
- Bob Jay: Guitar
- Thor Jenson: Guitar
- Charlie Burnham: Violin
- Mazz Swift: Violin
- Scott Robinson: Reeds, horns

== Discography ==
Title	Date of release	Record label
Bahamut	August 2006	Barbès Records (JARO in Europe)
Cicada	May 2011	Barbès Records (JARO in Europe)
Hazmat Modine Live	May 2014	JARO in Europe
Extra-Deluxe-Supreme	May 2015	JARO in Europe and Barbès in the U.S.
Box of Breath	May 2019 & 2020	JARO Medien GmbH & Geckophonic in the U.S.
Bonfire	2023	JARO Medien GmbH & Geckophonic in the U.S.
