= People of the World =

Studio album by Burning Spear
- Released: 1986
- Recorded: 1986
- Studio: Tuff Gong Studio Recording (Kingston, Jamaica)
- Genre: Roots reggae
- Label: Slash Records
- Producer: Burning Spear (also exec.); Nelson Miller

Burning Spear chronology
Resistance (1985)	People of the World (1986)	Mistress Music (1988)

Professional ratings
Review scores
Source	Rating
AllMusic	3/5 stars
Robert Christgau	B+
The Encyclopedia of Popular Music	3/5 stars

People of the World is a studio album by Jamaican reggae singer Burning Spear. It was released in 1986 via Slash Records. Recording sessions took place at Tuff Gong Recording Studio in Kingston. It was nominated for a Grammy Award for Best Reggae Recording at the 30th Annual Grammy Awards in 1988.

== Track listing ==
No.	Title	Length
1.	"People of the World"	4:00
2.	"I'm Not the Worst"	3:10
3.	"Seville Land"	2:53
4.	"Who's the Winner?"	3:50
5.	"Distant Drum"	4:07
6.	"We Are Going"	4:13
7.	"This Experience"	4:10
8.	"Built This City"	3:48
9.	"No Worry You'self"	3:46
10.	"Little Love Song"	3:48

== Personnel ==
- Winston Rodney – vocals, funde, harmony, producer
- Anthony Bradshaw – backing vocals, rhythm guitar, funde, harmony
- Richard Anthony Johnson – keyboards
- Robert Lyn – Yamaha Clap Expander synthesizer
- Lenford Richard – lead guitar
- Devon Bradshaw – bass
- Nelson Miller – drums, producer
- Alvin Haughton – percussion
- Jennifer Hill – saxophone
- Dean Fraser – saxophone
- Nilda Richards – trombone
- Ronald "Nambo" Robinson – trombone
- Pamela Fleming – trumpet
- Junior "Chico" Chin – trumpet
- Rass Brass – horn arrangement (tracks: 1–3, 5–6, 8–10)
- Burning Brass – horn arrangement (tracks: 4, 7)
- Mervyn Williams – recording
- Michael Sauvage – mixing
- Gary Sutherland – assistant engineering
- Ron Victor – assistant engineering
- Chris Bellman – mastering
- Michael Hodgson – art direction & design
- Scott Baldwin – illustration
- Donna Cline – photography
