= Blue Riddim Band =

American Reggae Band

The Blue Riddim Band was a Kansas City, Missouri-based reggae band and the first US-based group to play at Jamaica's Reggae Sunsplash festival, which they did in August 1982. (6). The recording of the group's 1982 Sunsplash performance was nominated for the Grammy Award for Best Reggae Album in 1986. (2)

== History ==
Blue Riddim emerged from the group Rhythm Funkshun in Miami in the mid-70s under the direction of instrumentalist and composer Bob Zohn and drummer Steve "Duck" McLane. (3)

Zohn and McLane began regular trips to Jamaica in 1973. During an early trip to Kingston, they visited the Turntable Club and met members of the Soul Syndicate band, a highly sought studio ensemble. Drummer "Santa" Davis and bassist George "Fully" Fullwood befriended Zohn and McLane and exchanged musical information with them for years to come. These relationships were vital to Blue Riddim's later success. (3)

Rhythm Funkshun added horn players Scott Korchak and Jack Blackett in 1977, and briefly used the name Pat's Blue Riddim before settling on Blue Riddim Band. By the end of the 1970s the group was based in Lawrence, Kansas and was touring the United States—headlining its own shows and opening for Jamaican acts, including Dennis Brown, Big Youth, Culture, Burning Spear, Peter Tosh, and Bob Marley. (3),(4). In addition to McLane, Zohn, Blackett and Korchak were Howard Yukon on guitar, Pat Pearce on keyboards and Drew Myers on bass and trombone.

In April 1980, Island Records owner Chris Blackwell paid for demo recordings of 19 tracks, engineered by Jack Nuber in Kansas City. These were never officially released. (5)

Flying Fish Records released the band's first studio album, Restless Spirit, in 1981. Lloyd James (a.k.a. Prince Jammy and later King Jammy) supervised the final mix for the album. Blue Riddim self-produced an album at Channel One Studios in Kingston, Jamaica in July/August 1982 and July/August 1983. These sessions were never officially released as a full album. "I'm Your Puppet" and "Higher and Higher" were released as singles, the former in Jamaica by Channel One studio manager Chuku Irving and the latter on the band's A Major Label. The group's other full-length album, Alive in Jamaica, is taken from recordings of their August 1982 Reggae Sunsplash performance. (6)

Blue Riddim was the first American reggae band to play the annual Sunsplash festival, then in its fifth year. Blue Riddim shared the honor of “best band” and was widely recognized by Jamaican press and radio for its accomplishment. (10)

Harmonica player Jimmy Becker, from Chicago, joined the group near the time of the first Sunsplash performance. Becker had lived in Kingston during the late 70s and recorded on studio sessions for Big Youth, the Gladiators, Dennis Brown, and Black Uhuru, among others. (4). Joining the band at the Sunsplash performance were percussionist Noel Simms (a.k.a. "Scully" a.k.a. Zoot Simms) and Kenny Sutchar on keyboards.

Alive In Jamaica was nominated for the Grammy Award for Best Reggae Album in 1986.

The band's song “Love People” was included in the soundtrack to the 1986 film Club Paradise starring Robin Williams and Jimmy Cliff. The original motion picture soundtrack also included work by Jimmy Cliff, Elvis Costello, and the Mighty Sparrow.

== Strategic Dance Initiative ==
In the mid-1980s, the band lost the right to use the Blue Riddim Band name in a dispute with its management company that was later settled out of court. Changing its name to S.D.I. (Strategic Dance Initiative), the core band members continued to perform in Kansas City for the next ten years (but without singer Scott Korchak and Jimmy Becker).

Founding member Bob Zohn left the group shortly after the 1982 Sunsplash performance and died of a heart attack in Ft. Lauderdale in June 1987. (7)

== Reunion ==
The group reunited in 1997 at Epiphany Artists' Sierra Nevada World Music Festival in California and performed subsequent concerts backing Big Youth and Junior Reid in 1998 in Kansas City. The group had informally backed other singers over the years who made cameo appearances with them, including Johnny Osbourne (in Los Angeles, 1983) and Mikey Dread (Catalina, 1985).

In December 1999, the group, including Scotty and Jimmy, performed their old repertoire to at Kansas City's Grand Emporium and Lawrence's Liberty Hall. In 2000 they backed both Ernie Smith and Chalice's Trevor Roper in Midwest concerts.

In 2007, singer Scott Korchak died from liver disease. The band was inducted into the Kansas Music Hall of Fame the same year.

In 2009, the group recorded an album Tribute, produced by Leonard DStroy (Kyle Dykes). Also in 2009, a studio session of mostly instrumentals, Ska Inferno, produced by saxophonist Jack Blackett, was released via Markosa Records.

In 2010, Blue Riddim consisted of charter members Steve “Duck” McLane on drums, Jack “Blackie” Blackett on tenor saxophone, with Todd “Bebop” Burd on bass, Jack Lightfoot on trumpet, Jimmy Becker on harmonica, and Joe Miquelon on keyboards. The core group was most recently augmented by Chris Bartak on trombone, Dan Bergner on keyboards, Jimmy Dykes on guitar/vocals and Edward Turner on vocals. Also in 2010, reggae artist and fellow Kansas City native Jack Miller released on CD a live session recorded in San Diego in 1981 under the title Ska Reggae Revival. These recordings had previously been distributed on cassette only. In the same year Rougher Records released "Tribute," a collection of Jamaican oldies produced by Todd Burd.

In 2011, Todd "Bebop" Burd and Emily "Goldie" Madison co-produced a single, released on 7-inch on Rougher Records, featuring Jamaican deejay Big Youth toasting over the band's original “Nancy Reagan” backing track. “Nancy Reagan” was a non-album novelty-cut originally released on a 12-inch single on the group's own A Major Label.

In 2013, Burd and Madison produced the band's latest album, a collaboration between Blue Riddim Band and The Rougher All Stars, "Enter The Riddim" released on Rougher Records. A video was produced for the first single "Do Me Like That."
