= No Destroyer =

Studio album by Burning Spear
- Released: 18 August 2023
- Recorded: 2011
- Studio: The Magic Shop
- Genre: Roots reggae
- Length: 52:29
- Label: Burning Music

Burning Spear chronology
Jah Is Real (2008)	No Destroyer (2023)

Professional ratings
Review scores
Source	Rating
Mojo	4/5 stars

No Destroyer is a studio album by Jamaican musician Burning Spear. It was released on 18 August 2023 through Burning Music.

The album was recorded in 2011 at the Magic Shop recording studio in New York City. It is Burning Spear's first studio album since he announced his retirement in 2016. He explained his choice to release new music by saying that "we can't retire from what His Majesty assigns us to do."

No Destroyer was nominated for the Grammy Award for Best Reggae Album in 2024.

== Track listing ==
All tracks are written by Winston Rodney, except where noted.

No.	Title	Writer(s)	Length
1.	"The Spear"		3:42
2.	"No Destroyer"		5:36
3.	"Independent"		4:24
4.	"Jamaica"		4:47
5.	"Cure for Cancer"		4:05
6.	"Obsession"		5:26
7.	"Mommy"		4:11
8.	"Open the Gate"		4:25
9.	"No Fool"		2:59
10.	"Negril"	Winston Rodney, Sonia Rodney	3:50
11.	"Talk"		4:29
12.	"They Think"		4:28
Total length:			52:29
