= Rasta Business =

Studio album by Burning Spear
- Released: 1995
- Recorded: 1995
- Studio: Grove Recording Studio (Ocho Rios, St. Ann's, Jamaica)
- Genre: Roots reggae
- Length: 47:38
- Label: Heartbeat Records
- Producer: Burning Spear; Nelson Miller

Burning Spear chronology
The World Should Know (1993)	Rasta Business (1995)	Living Dub Vol. 3 (1996)

Alternative cover

Professional ratings
Review scores
Source	Rating
AllMusic	4/5 stars
Robert Christgau	(dud)
The Encyclopedia of Popular Music	3/5 stars

Rasta Business is a studio album by Jamaican reggae singer Burning Spear. It was released in 1995 through Heartbeat Records. Recording sessions took place at Grove Recording Studio in Ocho Rios.

It was nominated for a Grammy Award for Best Reggae Album at the 38th Annual Grammy Awards in 1996.

== Track listing ==
All tracks are written by Winston Rodney.

No.	Title	Length
1.	"Africa"	4:47
2.	"This Man"	3:37
3.	"Not Stupid"	4:18
4.	"Creation"	3:40
5.	"Every Other Nation"	4:49
6.	"Burning Reggae"	4:29
7.	"Rasta Business"	4:18
8.	"Old Timer"	4:38
9.	"Subject in School"	3:45
10.	"Hello Rastaman"	4:46
11.	"Legal Hustlers"	4:48
Total length:		47:38

== Personnel ==
- Winston Rodney – vocals, percussion, akete, harmony, producer
- Carol "Passion" Nelson – harmony vocals
- Nelson Miller – backing vocals (track 9), drums, percussion
- Archibald "Tedo" Davis – backing vocals (track 9)
- Jay Noel – synthesizer (tracks: 1, 4)
- Robert Lyn – piano, synthesizers
- Lenford Richards – lead guitar, funde
- Rupert Bent – lead guitar
- Lenval "Shayar" Jarrett – rhythm guitar
- Paul Beckford – bass
- Basil Cunningham – bass (track 11)
- Alvin Haughton – percussion
- Uziah "Sticky" Thompson – percussion
- Mark Wilson – saxophone
- Dean Fraser – saxophone
- Charles Dickey – trombone
- Ronald "Nambo" Robinson – trombone
- James Smith – trumpet
- Junior "Chico" Chin – trumpet
- Barry O'Hare – recording, mixing
- Dr. Toby Mountain – mastering
- Garret Vandermolen – album supervision
- Nancy Given – design
- Shona Valeska – photography

== Chart history ==
Chart (1995)	Peak position
US Reggae Albums (Billboard)	15
