= Our Music (album) =

Studio album by Burning Spear
- Released: September 20, 2005
- Recorded: 2005
- Studio: Magic Shop, New York City
- Genre: Roots reggae
- Length: 55:17
- Label: Burning Music
- Producer: Burning Spear

Burning Spear chronology
Living Dub Vol. 6 (2004)	Our Music (2005)	Jah Is Real (2008)

Professional ratings
Review scores
Source	Rating
AllMusic	4/5 stars

Our Music is a studio album by Jamaican reggae singer Burning Spear. It was released on September 20, 2005, through Burning Music. Recording sessions took place at the Magic Shop Recording Studio in New York City.

The album was nominated for a Grammy Award for Best Reggae Album at the 48th Annual Grammy Awards in 2006.

== Track listing ==
All tracks are written by Winston Rodney.

No.	Title	Length
1.	"Our Music"	4:52
2.	"Try Again"	5:00
3.	"Down in Jamaica"	4:15
4.	"Together" (Extended Mix)	6:21
5.	"Friends"	4:29
6.	"O' Rastaman" (Extended Mix)	7:13
7.	"Fix Me"	3:56
8.	"Walk"	3:25
9.	"One Marcus Garvey"	4:41
10.	"My Duty"	3:55
11.	"Little Garvey" (Extended Mix)	7:10
Total length:		55:17

== Personnel ==
- Winston Rodney – lead vocals, background vocals, percussion, arranger
- Num Heru-ur Shutef Amon'Tehu – background vocals, percussion
- Marie Della Thomas – background vocals
- Joanne Williams – background vocals
- Patrick Gordon – background vocals
- Simone Gordon – background vocals
- Melanie Lynch – background vocals
- Celia Chavez – background vocals
- Michael Hyde – keyboards
- Earl Appleton – keyboards (tracks: 10, 11)
- Ian "Beezy" Coleman – lead guitar, rhythm guitar, bass guitar
- Donovan Mackity – lead guitar
- Andy Bassford – lead guitar
- Chino Smith – lead guitar
- Cecil Ordonez – lead guitar (track 7)
- Linford Carby – rhythm guitar
- I Palmer – bass guitar
- David Rekhley – bass guitar (tracks: 10, 11)
- Leroy "Horsemouth" Wallace – drums
- Karl W. Wright – drums (tracks: 10, 11)
- Jerry Johnson – saxophone
- Jason Jackson – trombone
- Kevin Batchelor – trumpet
- Barry O'Hare – recording
- Benedetto Antonio Caccavale – assistant engineering
- Chris Gehringer – mastering
- Mark Seliger – photography
- Carter Van Pelt – footage

== Chart history ==
Chart (2005)	Peak position
French Albums (SNEP)	177
US Reggae Albums (Billboard)	12
