= Club Paradise =

1986 film by Harold Ramis

- Theatrical release poster
- Directed by: Harold Ramis
- Screenplay by: Harold Ramis Brian Doyle-Murray
- Story by: Harry Shearer Tom Leopold Chris Miller David Standish
- Produced by: Michael Shamberg
- Starring: Robin Williams; Peter O'Toole; Rick Moranis; Jimmy Cliff; Twiggy; Adolph Caesar; Eugene Levy; Joanna Cassidy; Andrea Martin; Brian Doyle-Murray
- Cinematography: Peter Hannan
- Edited by: Marion Rothman
- Music by: David Mansfield Van Dyke Parks Jimmy Cliff
- Distributed by: Warner Bros.
- Release date: July 11, 1986
- Running time: 95 minutes
- Country: United States
- Language: English
- Budget: $19 million
- Box office: $12.3 million (domestic)

Club Paradise is a 1986 American comedy film directed by Harold Ramis and starring Robin Williams, Twiggy, Peter O'Toole and Jimmy Cliff. Set in a fictional Caribbean banana republic, it follows a group of vacationers' attempts to create a luxury resort from a seedy nightclub, and the series of events that take place.

The film reunites director and cowriter Ramis with his SCTV co-stars Andrea Martin, Eugene Levy, and Joe Flaherty, and includes additional SCTV performers Rick Moranis and Robin Duke. They play supporting roles in the film, as does cowriter Brian Doyle-Murray, a former SCTV staff writer. It was the final film of actor Adolph Caesar, who died in March 1986, four months before the film's release.

== Plot ==
Jack Moniker is a Chicago firefighter who is injured on the job. Using his disability insurance payout, he retires to the small (fictional) Caribbean island of Saint Nicholas, and buys a small property. Anthony Croyden Hayes, appointed by the British crown as governor of St. Nicholas, is concerned more with vacationing than governing. Miss Phillipa Lloyd, who is visiting St. Nicholas with some friends, decides to stay permanently, and becomes Jack's girlfriend.

Jack befriends financially-troubled reggae musician Ernest Reed, and they form Club Paradise, which they market as a Club Med-style resort, complete with a brochure that features photographs of Jack in various disguises on every page. This attracts a handful of tourists, including Barry Nye and Barry Steinberg, who are there for the marijuana and the women.

Much of the film involves the tourists' comic misadventures adjusting to island life, and the low-rent facilities of Club Paradise. Also traveling to the island is The New York Times travel writer Terry Hamlin, who ends up spending most of her time in the company of Governor Hayes. Adding to the comedic content is suburban housewife Linda White, who is vacationing with her husband Randy, who, despite the very favorable surroundings and atmosphere, is not very randy.

Voit Zerbe plays a key role, as a developer who wants to force Jack and Ernest from their property so that he can build a massive high-end casino on the beach, as part of a deal that he is making with two business partners. To do that, he uses the help of the local prime minister, Solomon Gundy, and his men to cause trouble to have Club Paradise to close "legally". Jack and Ernest board Zerbe's yacht to provide some "useful intelligence" for Governor Hayes, by finding out what is going to happen to the future of St. Nicholas. They skin dive to the yacht, where they are captured by local police and thrown in jail. When Prime Minister Gundy's strong-arm tactics do not work, he orders a military takeover of the island. Ernest builds up a resistance force, and St. Nicholas is soon threatened with the possibility of civil war, which is averted at the last minute with assistance from Jack and Governor Hayes. As Gundy's takeover fails, Zerbe and his partners leave St. Nicholas and head for the Cayman Islands.

== Cast ==
- Robin Williams as Jack Moniker
- Peter O'Toole as Governor Anthony Croyden Hayes
- Rick Moranis as Barry Nye
- Jimmy Cliff as Ernest Reed
- Twiggy as Phillipa "Philadelphia" Lloyd
- Adolph Caesar as Prime Minister Solomon "Sol" Gundy
- Eugene Levy as Barry Steinberg
- Joanna Cassidy as Terry Hamlin
- Andrea Martin as Linda White
- Brian Doyle-Murray as Voit Zerbe
- Joe Flaherty as Pilot
- Steven Kampmann as Dr. Randy White
- Robin Duke as Mary Lou
- Mary Gross as Jackie
- Simon Jones as Toby Prooth
- Antoinette Bower as Pamela
- Peter Bromilow as Nigel
- Louise Bennett as Portia
- Charles Hyatt as Mr. Banks
- Leonie Forbes as Mrs. Geddes
- Richard Wiese as Christopher
- Carl Bradshaw as Cabbie
- Carey Lowell as Fashion Model
- Louis Zorich as Swiss Businessman
- Bruce McGill as Dave
- Ansel Collins, Chinna Smith, Bertram McLean, Christopher Meredith, Wilburn Cole, and Sydney Wolfe as Flamboyant (Ernest Reed's band)

Harold Ramis's wife, Anne Ramis, has a cameo appearance as a travel agent.

== Production ==
Shooting took place in Jamaica, Chicago and Los Angeles from April to July 1985. The titular "Club Paradise" was a set constructed on Winnifred Beach in Portland Parish, while other scenes were shot in the city of Port Antonio. Warner Bros. Pictures planned to release it in early 1986, but held it back until July.

Bill Murray turned down the film's lead role Jack Moniker, which was eventually given to Robin Williams; his brother, Brian Doyle-Murray, ended up in the cast. John Cleese was also slated to star, but immediately dropped out, before Peter O'Toole signed on to replace him.

"Ed Roboto" is a pseudonym for Harry Shearer, who was asked to do a rewrite with Tom Leopold. Only two words of what the two writers wrote ended up in the film (the title). Shearer commented that he was "so appalled by the movie" that he removed his name from the credits.

Adolph Caesar died of a heart attack four months before the film's release.

== Soundtrack ==
The film's soundtrack was released by Columbia Records, and includes several tracks by Jimmy Cliff, Elvis Costello, Mighty Sparrow, Blue Riddim Band and Well Pleased & Satisfied, some of which are unique to this release. It was released on CD in Japan in 1994, and in 2004 in Europe, with the latter including seven extra songs.

== Reception ==
The film was given mostly negative reviews from critics, with Rotten Tomatoes maintaining Club Paradise an 11% rating, based on 28 reviews. Metacritic, which uses a weighted average, assigned the film a score of 40 out of 100, based on 13 critics, indicating "mixed or average" reviews. Audiences polled by CinemaScore gave the film an average grade of "C+" on a scale of A+ to F.

=== Critical response ===
Variety said, "There are enough funny skits in Club Paradise to make for a good hour of SCTV, where most of the cast is from, but too few to keep this Club Med satire afloat for 104 minutes."

People wrote, "Director Harold Ramis, who co-wrote the film with Brian Doyle-Murray, never stoops for an easy laugh. He seems capable, however, of making a movie with more momentum than this."

Roger Ebert of the Chicago Sun-Times gave the film 2 stars out of 4 stars, and wrote, "The movie never really comes together, and I think the fault for that begins with Williams. When the star of a movie seems desperate enough to depend on one-liners, can the rest of the cast be blamed for losing confidence in the script?"

Dave Kehr of the Chicago Reader wrote, "Moranis and Levy get most of the laughs as a pair of geeky business partners desperately on the make for beach bunnies; Williams is saddled with a lot of soggy insult humor that doesn't really let him show his gifts."

Ramis said, "We thought Club Paradise had a good chance at the box office. But we were the fourth Caribbean comedy out that year, and none of them did any business. The casting ended up being diametrically opposed to what was intended. It was intended for Bill Murray and John Cleese, with Bill as the laid-back guy and Cleese as the over-the-top guy, and we ended up with Robin Williams and Peter O'Toole, with O'Toole as the laid-back guy and Robin the over-the-top guy. The polarities shifted, and it was probably not as interesting or as solid as it might have been if Bill and Cleese were there."

Peter O'Toole's performance in the film earned a nomination for the Golden Raspberry Award for Worst Supporting Actor, but lost to Jerome Benton for Under the Cherry Moon at the 7th Golden Raspberry Awards.

== See also ==
- List of American films of 1986
