= Bahamut (album) =

Studio album by Hazmat Modine
- Released: August 26, 2006
- Recorded: 1999–2005
- Genre: Pop rock; blues; folk; jazz; world
- Length: 68:00
- Label: Barbès Records

Hazmat Modine chronology
Bahamut (2006)	Cicada (2011)

Bahamut is the debut album by American blues/folk/world music/jazz band Hazmat Modine. The album was released on August 26, 2006 by Barbès Records. Most tracks were composed by lead singer Wade Schuman; the album also includes arrangements of traditional songs. Tuvan folk band Huun-Huur-Tu feature on three tracks with their characteristic throat singing.

== Track listing ==
No.	Title	Writer(s)	Length
1.	"Yesterday Morning"	Wade Schuman	5:08
2.	"It Calls Me" (Featuring Huun-Huur-Tu)	Schuman	3:10
3.	"Bahamut"	Schuman	6:03
4.	"Fred of Ballaroy"	Schuman	1:28
5.	"Broke My Baby's Heart"		7:20
6.	"Almost Gone"	Schuman	3:25
7.	"Steady Roll"	J. Bernie Barbour / Traditional	5:34
8.	"Everybody Loves You" (Featuring Huun-Huur-Tu)	Schuman	6:16
9.	"Lost Fox Train"	Schuman	3:39
10.	"Dry Spell"	Schuman	4:44
11.	"Ugly Rug"	Schuman	1:24
12.	"Who Walks in When I Walk Out?"		4:47
13.	"Grade-A Gray Day"	Schuman	3:36
14.	"Man Trouble" (Featuring Huun-Huur-Tu)	Jaybird Coleman / Traditional	11:11
15.	"Ticket #14-9140"	Schuman	0:15

== Personnel ==
Hazmat Modine

- Henry Bogdan: Hawaiian guitar
- Josh Camp: Claviola
- Joseph Daley: Tuba
- Steve Elson: Baritone saxophone
- Alexander Fedoriouk: Cimbalom
- Michael Gomez: Guitar
- Daniel Hovey: Guitar
- Richard Huntley: Drums
- Wade Schuman: Guitar, harmonica, lute, vocals
- Jon Sholle: Guitar
- Pete Smith: Guitar
- Scott Veenstra: Drums
- Randy Weinstein: Guitar, vocals

Huun-Huur-Tu

- Sayan Bapa
- Anatoli Kuular

== Reception ==
Bahamut peaked at #12 on Billboard's "Top Blues Albums" chart.

Reviewing the album for Allmusic, Jeff Tamarkin gave it four stars out of a possible five, and termed it a "stunning debut". Tamarkin praised the band for successfully fusing styles as disparate as blues, jazz, klezmer, calypso, and ska into "music that sounds at once ageless and primeval, authentically indigenous and inexplicably otherworldly, familiar and unlike anything else." He also praised the group for making "listener-friendly music" that doesn't "require a degree in ethnomusicology to enjoy".

Pitchfork Media reviewer Joe Tangari gave the album's track "Everybody Loves You," a collaboration with Tuvan throat singers Huun-Huur-Tu, a four-star review. Characterizing it as "generalized roots music that takes from pretty much any roots it sees fit," he praised it as "true world music, weird and wonderful to the last note."
