= The Rough Guide to Voodoo =

The Rough Guide To Voodoo

Compilation album by Various artists
- Released: 24 September 2013
- Genre: World
- Length: 118:40
- Label: World Music Network

Full series chronology
The Rough Guide to Country Legends: Jimmie Rodgers (2013)	The Rough Guide To Voodoo (2013)	The Rough Guide to the Music of the Mediterranean (2013)

The Rough Guide To Voodoo is a world music compilation album originally released in 2013 featuring music inspired and influenced by the Voodoo religious tradition (from West African Vodun to New World Haitian Vodou, Louisiana Voodoo, and related movements). Part of the World Music Network Rough Guides series, the album contains two discs: an overview of the genre on Disc One, and a "bonus" Disc Two highlighting Erol Josué. Disc One features four American tracks, two each from Brazil, Haiti, and Cuba, and one each from Trinidad and Benin. The collection was compiled by Dan Rosenberg and was produced by Phil Stanton, co-founder of the World Music Network.

== Critical reception ==
Professional ratings
Review scores
Source	Rating
Songlines	4/5 stars
PopMatters	7/10 stars
The Australian	3.5/5 stars

The album was met with generally positive reviews. Neil Kelly of Pop Matters wrote that Disc One was often "unsettling", and that it "deserves serious consideration for truth in advertising alone." He also praised the accessibility of Disc Two.

== Track listing ==
=== Disc One ===
No.	Title	Artist (Country)	Length
1.	"Guede Nibo"	Grupo Vocal Desandann (Haiti) (Cuba)	2:07
2.	"Shango"	Lord Nelson (Trinidad and Tobago)	4:21
3.	"Marie Laveau"	Dr. John (United States)	3:56
4.	"Segala"	Gangbé Brass Band (Benin)	4:30
5.	"Canto De Xango"	Baden Powell & Vinicius De Moraes (Brazil)	5:52
6.	"Osain/Osanyin"	Bata Ketu (United States) (Cuba) (Brazil)	10:35
7.	"Cantos Iyesa"	Lazaro Ros & Olorun (Cuba)	4:28
8.	"Dey"	Toto Bissainthe (Haiti)	3:39
9.	"Canto De Oxum"	Maria Bethânia (Brazil)	5:15
10.	"Yemaya"	Conjunto Folklorico Nacional De Cuba	9:02
11.	"New Orleans Funeral"	Steve Gray (United States)	2:33
12.	"Marie Laveau"	Craig Klein Feat. John Boutté (United States)	6:52

=== Disc Two ===
Disc Two is a re-release of the album Régléman by Erol Josué, a Haitian Voodoo priest.

No.	Title	Length
1.	"Hounto Legba"	3:19
2.	"Madam Letan"	5:13
3.	"La Souvenance"	2:46
4.	"Madichon"	4:33
5.	"Ochan Lavi"	4:30
6.	"Balize"	3:51
7.	"Atomp’A"	4:23
8.	"Garçon Solide"	4:22
9.	"Vire Wonn"	4:54
10.	"Ti Moun Yo"	4:03
11.	"Yege Dahomen"	5:45
12.	"Nadoki Nadoka"	3:45
13.	"Krepsol"	4:06
