= The Burning Spear Experience =

Compilation album by Burning Spear
- Released: 2007
- Genre: Reggae

Burning Spear chronology
Living Dub Vol. 5 (2006)	The Burning Spear Experience (2007)	Jah Is Real (2008)

The Burning Spear Experience is a compilation album by Jamaican reggae singer Burning Spear. It was nominated for a Grammy Award for Best Reggae Album at the 50th Grammy Awards in 2008.

== Track listing ==
=== Disc 1 ===
1. On the Inside (4:21)
2. Music Business [Unreleased] (4:45)
3. Experience (4:12)
4. Jah Rasta [Unreleased] (3:09)
5. Burning Reggae (4:27)
6. Part Two: Marcus Garvey [Recorded in Australia] (7:08)
7. Institution [Jamaica Version] (3:29)
8. Business Dub (4:46)
9. My Roots [Jamaica Version] (4:21)
10. Part Two: Loving Day [Unreleased] (4:06)
11. Part Two: Driver [Recorded in Australia] (6:59)
12. Cry Blood [Jamaica Version] (5:06)

=== Disc 2 ===
1. I Am In [Unreleased] (4:08)
2. Part Two: Man in the Hills [Recorded in Australia] (7:19)
3. So Clean [Unreleased] (2:29)
4. Negril (4:06)
5. Pieces of Dub (3:24)
6. Repartition [Jamaica Version] (3:41)
7. Part Two: Happy Day (7:30)
8. Throw Down Your Arms [Jamaica Version] (4:05)
9. Trust (3:57)
10. Part Two: Creation Rebel (6:54)
11. Come in Peace (4:21)
12. Part Two: Door Peep [Recorded In Albuquerque, New Mexico] (8:21)
13. Part Two: We Been There (7:24)

=== Disc 3 ===
1. [Bonus Material] [DVD]
