= Mek We Dweet =

Studio album by Burning Spear
- Released: 1990
- Studios: Tuff Gong, Kingston, Jamaica
- Genre: Roots reggae
- Length: 42:41
- Label: Island
- Producers: Burning Spear (also exec.); Nelson Miller

Burning Spear chronology
| Mistress Music (1988) | Mek We Dweet (1990) | Jah Kingdom (1991) |

Mek We Dweet is a studio album by the Jamaican reggae singer Burning Spear, released in 1990 via Island Records. The recording sessions took place at Tuff Gong Recording Studio in Kingston. Burning Spear supported the album by touring with Reggae Sunsplash.

The album peaked at number 2 on the World Albums chart in the United States, and was nominated for a Grammy Award for Best Reggae Recording at the 33rd Annual Grammy Awards in 1991.

== Critical reception ==
Professional ratings
Review scores
| Source | Rating |
|---|---|
| AllMusic | 4/5 stars |
| Chicago Tribune | 3.5/4 stars |
| The Encyclopedia of Popular Music | 3/5 stars |

The Chicago Tribune wrote: "As Burning Spear looks to a future of justice and equality, he also envisions a music as modern, energetic and polished as anything young reggae lions like Ziggy Marley are doing today."

== Track listing ==
| No. | Title | Length |
|---|---|---|
| 1. | "Mek We Dweet" | 4:20 |
| 2. | "Civilization" | 4:06 |
| 3. | "Garvey" | 4:12 |
| 4. | "Elephants" | 3:53 |
| 5. | "My Roots" | 4:21 |
| 6. | "Take a Look" | 4:33 |
| 7. | "Great Men" | 4:11 |
| 8. | "One People" | 4:12 |
| 9. | "African Woman" | 4:18 |
| 10. | "Mek We Dweet in Dub" | 4:28 |
| Total length: | | 42:41 |

== Personnel ==
- Winston Rodney – vocals, drums, producer, executive producer
- Lenford Richard – piano, lead guitar, flute
- Robert Lyn – piano, synthesizer
- Lenval "Shayar" Jarrett – rhythm guitar
- Paul Beckford – bass guitar
- Nelson Miller – drums, producer
- Alvin Haughton – percussion
- Dean Ivanhoe Fraser – saxophone
- David Robinson – saxophone (tracks: 3, 7)
- Ronald "Nambo" Robinson – trombone
- Charles Dickey – trombone (tracks: 3, 7)
- Junior "Chico" Chin – trumpet
- James Smith – trumpet (tracks: 3, 7)
- Mervyn Williams – recording, mixing
- Gary Sutherland – recording
- Anthony Kelly – recording
- Michel Sauvage – mixing
- Garth Atkins – assistant recording
- Danny Mormando – assistant mixing
- Tony Dawsey – mastering
- Mo Ström – cover design
- Peter Hugh Dennis – illustration
- Deborah Feingold – photography

== Chart history ==
| Chart (1990) | Peak position |
|---|---|
| US World Albums (Billboard) | 2 |
