= Cicada (Hazmat Modine album) =

Studio album by Hazmat Modine
- Released: May 17, 2011
- Recorded: 2007
- Genre: Pop rock, blues, folk, jazz, world
- Length: 51:13
- Label: Barbès Records

Hazmat Modine chronology
Bahamut (2006)	Cicada (2011)

Cicada is a 2011 album by American blues/folk/world fusion/jazz band Hazmat Modine. The album was released on May 17, 2011 by Barbès Records, almost five years after their debut album, Bahamut.

Beninese musical ensemble Gangbé Brass Band features on two tracks; Natalie Merchant and the Kronos Quartet feature on one each.

== Track listing ==
All songs written by Wade Schuman except as noted

No.	Title	Writer(s)	Length
1.	"Mocking Bird"		3:44
2.	"Child of a Blind Man" (Featuring Gangbé Brass Band and Natalie Merchant)		4:12
3.	"Two Forty Seven"		4:46
4.	"Cicada"	M. Gomez	4:52
5.	"Buddy"		6:08
6.	"In Two Years"	J. Daley	2:00
7.	"I've Been Lonely for So Long"		4:19
8.	"The Tide"	M. Gomez	5:50
9.	"Ebb Tide"		0:46
10.	"Walking Stick"	Irving Berlin	3:01
11.	"So Glad"		5:44
12.	"Cotonou Stomp" (Featuring Gangbé Brass Band)		2:05
13.	"Dead Crow" (Featuring the Kronos Quartet)		3:36

== Personnel ==
- Magloire Ahouandjinou: Trumpet, vocals
- Martial Ahouandjinou: Trombone, vocals
- Benoît Avihoue: Percussion, vocals
- Bill Barrett: Chromatic harmonica, vocals
- Alexis Bloom: Vocals
- Elaine Caswell: Vocals
- Joseph Daley: Sousaphone, tuba
- Athanase Dehoumon: Flugelhorn, vocals
- Hank Dutt: Viola
- Steve Elson: Clarinet, contra-alto clarinet, piccolo, baritone saxophone, soprano saxophone, tenor saxophone
- Michael Farkas: Handclapping, vocals
- Alexander Fedoriouk: Cimbalom
- Pam Fleming: Trumpet
- Lucien Gbaguidi: Saxophone, vocals
- Michael Gomez: Balalaika, electric mandocello, guitar, resonator guitar, lap steel guitar, shamisen
- David Harrington: Violin
- Richard Livingston Huntley: Drums, gong, log drums, talking drum
- Crespin Kpitiki: Percussion, vocals
- Scott Lehrer: Vocals
- Natalie Merchant: Vocals
- Erik Della Penna: Guitar, handclapping, vocals
- Reut Regev: Trombone
- Catherine Russell: Vocals
- Wade Schuman: Guitar, handclapping, vocals
- John Sherba: Violin
- Pete Smith: Guitar, vocals
- James Vodounnon: Sousaphone, vocals
- Eric Yovogan: Trumpet, vocals
- Jeffrey Zeigler: Cello

== Reception ==
Cicada received positive reviews from critics. Robin Denselow, writing for The Guardian, gave the album four out of five stars. Calling it "a brave and unexpected record", he was complimentary of several tracks but singled out the collaborations with Gangbé Brass Band, Natalie Merchant, and the Kronos Quartet as highlights. In another four-star review, All About Jazz praised the band's eclectic makeup and concluded, "Even if Cicada doesn't surpass the novelty or the awards of the group's debut, Bahamut, it is a CD of spectacular aural aurora; one that brings an authentic, multi-referenced, American approach to the concept of world music."

Bill Lupoletti, host of the "Global a Go-Go" program on WRIR public radio, called Cicada a "brilliant album", highlighting "Child of a Blind Man", "I've Been Lonely for So Long", "Walking Stick", "So Glad", and "Dead Crow" as the album's best tracks. Allmusic's William Ruhlmann considered Cicada more "traditional jazz" than Bahamut, while still calling the band's sound "an eclectic mixture of roots styles that is nearly beyond category".
