= Grammy Award for Best Reggae Album =

Honor presented to recording artists for quality reggae albums

- Awarded for: Quality reggae albums
- Country: United States
- Presented by: National Academy of Recording Arts and Sciences
- First award: 1985
- Currently held by: Keznamdi – Blxxd & Fyah (2026)
- Website: grammy.com

The Grammy Award for Best Reggae Album is an award presented at the Grammy Awards for quality works in the reggae genre. Originally called the Grammy Award for Best Reggae Recording, the honor was presented to artists for eligible songs or albums. The Jamaican group Black Uhuru received the first award in 1985. Beginning with the 1992 ceremony, the name of the award was changed to Best Reggae Album. Starting in 2002, awards were often presented to the engineers, mixers, and/or producers in addition to the performing artists. According to the category description guide for the 52nd Grammy Awards, eligible works are vocal or instrumental reggae albums "containing at least 51% playing time of newly recorded music", including roots reggae, dancehall and ska music.

At the 62nd Annual Grammy Awards in 2020, Koffee became the youngest person. Ziggy Marley holds the record for the most wins in this category, with seven wins as of 2017. Sharon Marley and Cedella Marley of Ziggy Marley and the Melody Makers hold the record for most wins and nominations by a female artist, with three wins out of eight nominations. The current recipient of the award is Keznamdi, who won at the 68th Annual Grammy Awards with his album Blxxd & Fyah.

== Recipients ==
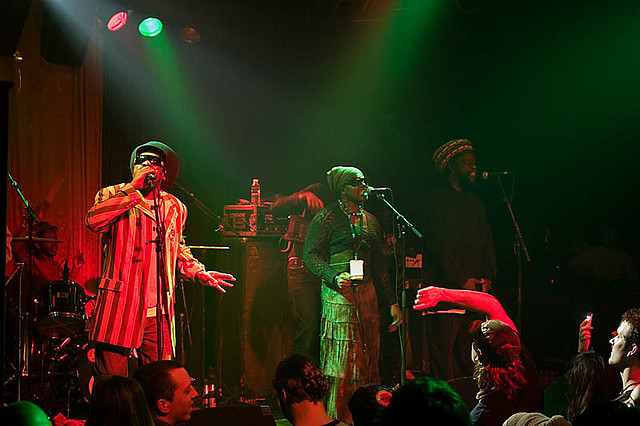
Inaugural recipients Black Uhuru

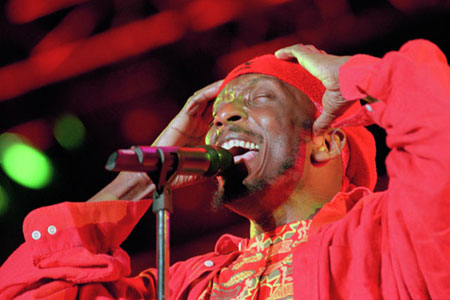
1986 award recipient Jimmy Cliff in 1997

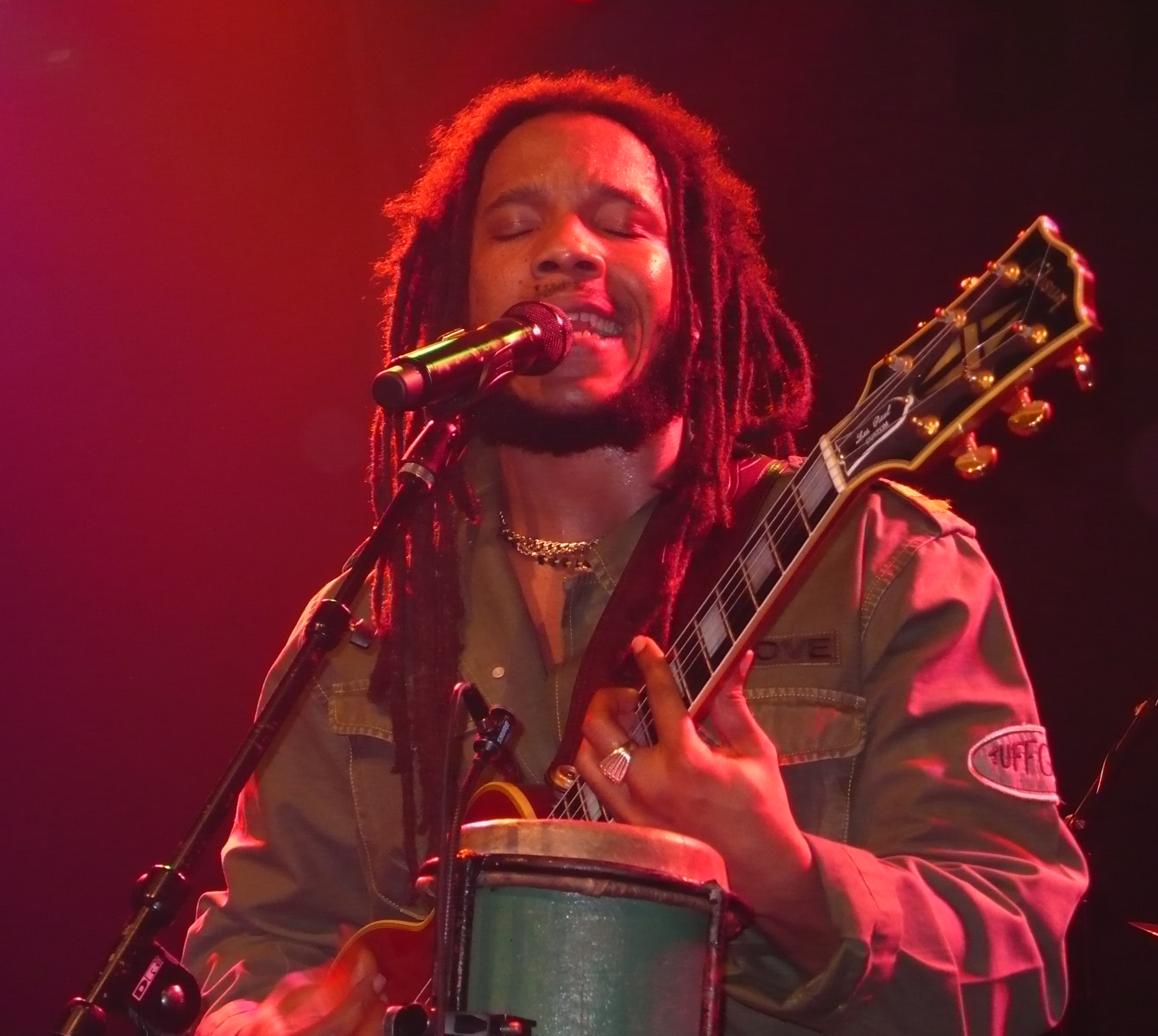
Five-time award winner Stephen Marley (three times as a member of the band Ziggy Marley and the Melody Makers) in 2007

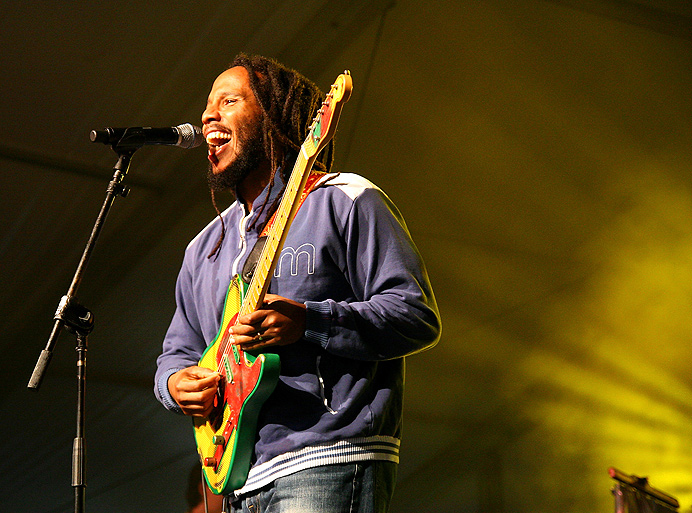
Six-time award winner Ziggy Marley (three times as the leader of his eponymous band), performing at the Austin City Limits Music Festival in 2007

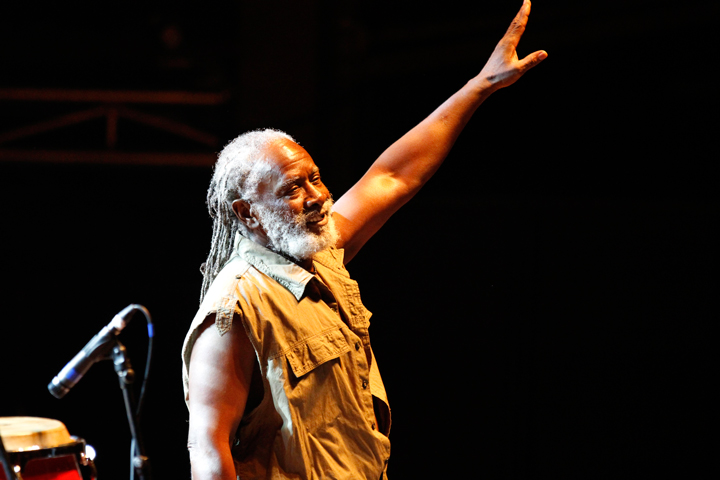
Thirteen-time nominee and two-time winner Burning Spear.

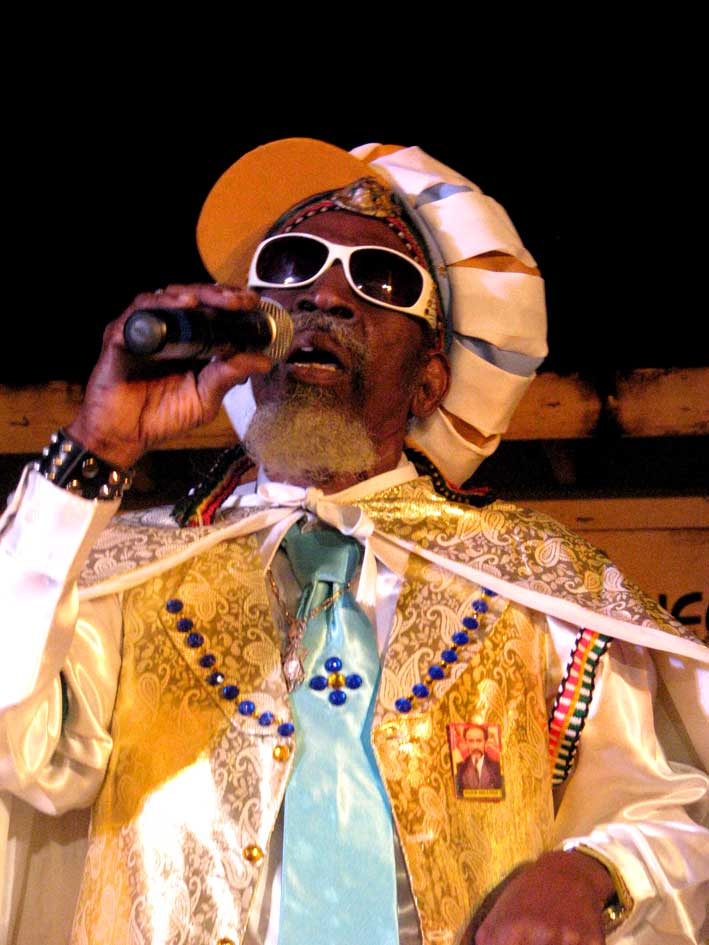
Three-time award winner Bunny Wailer, performing in 2009

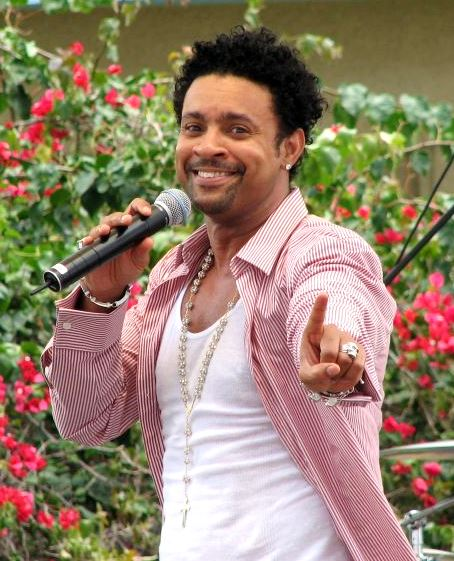
1996 award winner Shaggy, performing in 2006

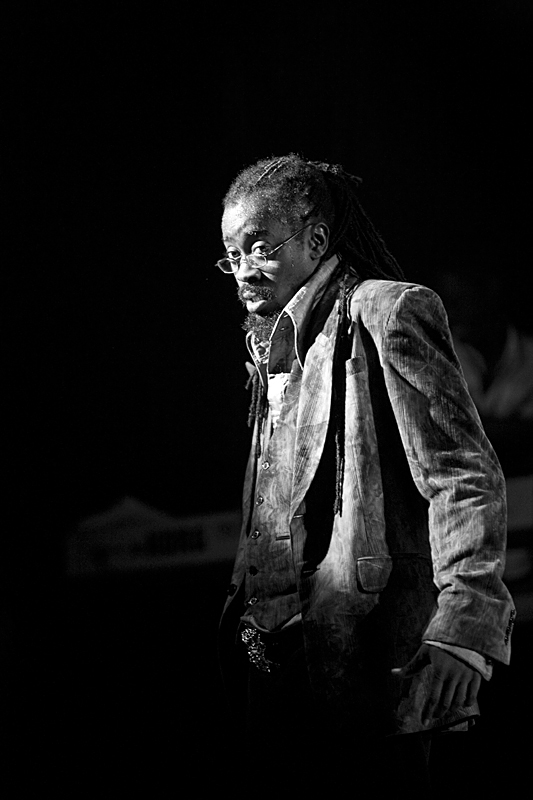
2001 award winner Beenie Man in 2008

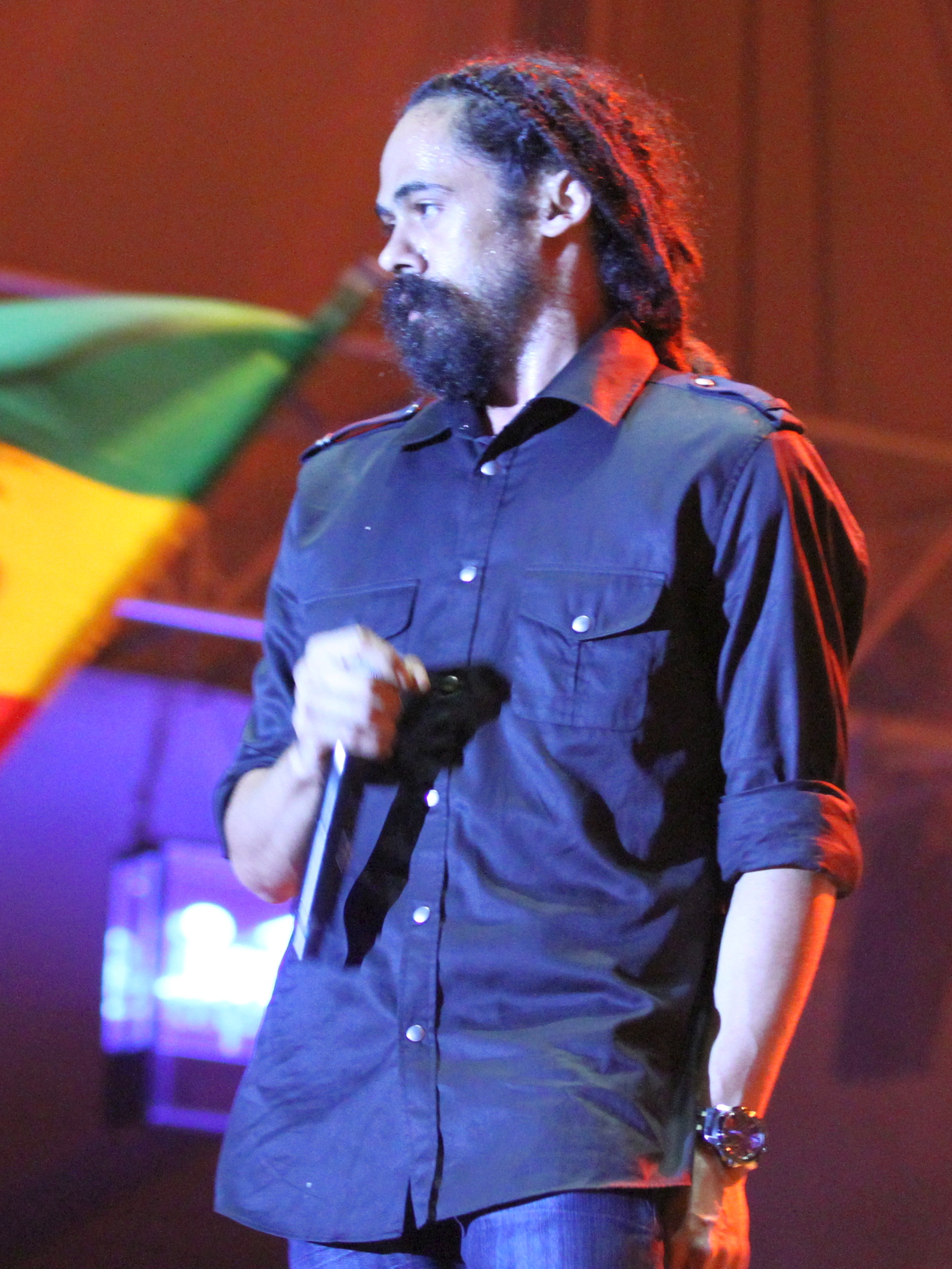
Three-time award winner Damian Marley, performing in 2015.

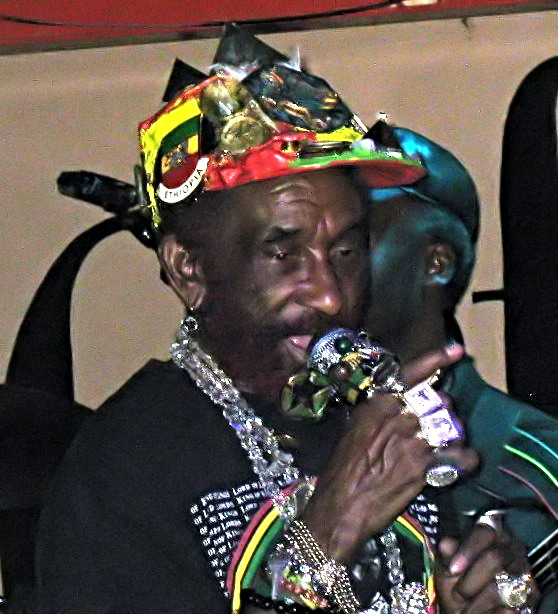
2003 award recipient Lee "Scratch" Perry, performing in 2008

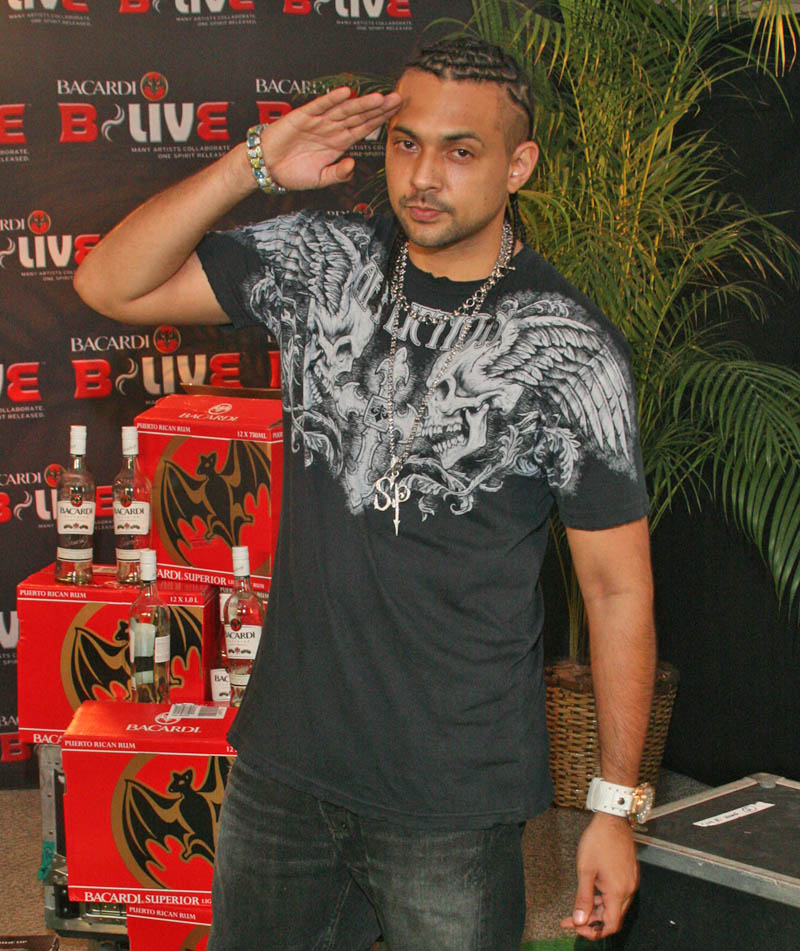
2004 award winner, Sean Paul

=== 1980s ===
Year^{[I]}	Work	Performing artist(s)
1985
1985	Anthem	Black Uhuru
1985	Captured Live	Peter Tosh
1985	King Yellowman	Yellowman
1985	"Reggae Night"	Jimmy Cliff
1985	"Steppin' Out"	Steel Pulse
1986
1986	Cliff Hanger	Jimmy Cliff
1986	Alive in Jamaica	Blue Riddim Band
1986	Play the Game Right	Ziggy Marley and the Melody Makers
1986	Resistance	Burning Spear
1986	Working Wonders	Judy Mowatt
1987
1987	Babylon the Bandit	Steel Pulse
1987	Brutal	Black Uhuru
1987	Club Paradise	Jimmy Cliff
1987	Linton Kwesi Johnson in Concert with the Dub Band	Linton Kwesi Johnson and the Dub Band
1987	Rasta Philosophy	The Itals
1988
1988	No Nuclear War	Peter Tosh
1988	Brutal Dub	Black Uhuru
1988	Hold on to Love	Third World
1988	People of the World	Burning Spear
1988	UB40 CCCP: Live in Moscow	UB40
1989
1989	Conscious Party	Ziggy Marley and the Melody Makers
1989	"Breakfast in Bed"	UB40 and Chrissie Hynde
1989	Hanging Fire	Jimmy Cliff
1989	Toots in Memphis	Toots Hibbert
1989	UB40	UB40

=== 1990s ===
Year^{[I]}	Work	Performing artist(s)
1990
1990	One Bright Day	Ziggy Marley and the Melody Makers
1990	I.D.	Wailers Band
1990	Liberation	Bunny Wailer
1990	Live in Paris Zenith '88	Burning Spear
1990	Serious Business	Third World
1991
1991	Time Will Tell: A Tribute to Bob Marley	Bunny Wailer
1991	An Hour Live	Toots & the Maytals
1991	Make Place for the Youth	Andrew Tosh
1991	Mek We Dweet	Burning Spear
1991	Now	Black Uhuru
1992
1992	As Raw As Ever	Shabba Ranks
1992	Gumption	Bunny Wailer
1992	Iron Storm	Black Uhuru
1992	Jahmekya	Ziggy Marley and the Melody Makers
1992	Victims	Steel Pulse
1992	We Must Carry On	Rita Marley
1993
1993	X-tra Naked	Shabba Ranks
1993	All Over the World	The Wailing Souls
1993	Breakout	Jimmy Cliff
1993	Committed	Third World
1993	Rastafari Centennial: Live in Paris – Elysee Montmartre	Steel Pulse
1994
1994	"Bad Boys"	Inner Circle
1994	Fe Real	Maxi Priest
1994	Joy and Blues	Ziggy Marley and the Melody Makers
1994	Mystical Truth	Black Uhuru
1994	The World Should Know	Burning Spear
1995
1995	Crucial! Roots Classics	Bunny Wailer
1995	Light My Fire	Dennis Brown
1995	Reggae Dancer	Inner Circle
1995	Rise and Shine	Aswad
1995	Stir It Up	Various Artists
1995	Strongg	Black Uhuru
1996
1996	Boombastic	Shaggy
1996	Free Like We Want 2 B	Ziggy Marley and the Melody Makers
1996	Hi-Bop Ska! The 30th Anniversary Recording	The Skatalites
1996	Live It Up	Third World
1996	Rasta Business	Burning Spear
1997
1997	Hall of Fame: A Tribute to Bob Marley's 50th Anniversary	Bunny Wailer
1997	Greetings from Skamania	The Skatalites
1997	Lyrically Potent	Sister Carol
1997	Man with the Fun	Maxi Priest
1997	Mr. Cool	Gregory Isaacs
1998
1998	Fallen Is Babylon	Ziggy Marley and the Melody Makers
1998	Appointment with His Majesty	Burning Spear
1998	Big Up	Aswad
1998	Freedom of Speech	Yellowman
1998	Rage and Fury	Steel Pulse
1999
1999	Friends	Sly and Robbie
1999	Inna Heights	Buju Banton
1999	Many Moods of Moses	Beenie Man
1999	Psychedelic Souls	The Wailing Souls
1999	Ska Father	Toots & the Maytals

=== 2000s ===
Year^{[I]}	Work	Performing artist(s)
2000
2000	Calling Rastafari	Burning Spear
2000	The Doctor	Beenie Man
2000	Generation Coming	Third World
2000	Living Legacy	Steel Pulse
2000	Roots Revival	Aswad
2001
2001	Art and Life	Beenie Man
2001	Equality	The Wailing Souls
2001	Let Me Be the One	Dennis Brown
2001	Life Is a Miracle	Pato Banton
2001	Private & Confidential	Gregory Isaacs
2002
2002	Halfway Tree	Damian Marley
2002	Island Warriors	Various Artists
2002	Many More Roads	Ky-Mani Marley
2002	Music Is Life	Beres Hammond
2002	A New Day	Luciano
2003
2003	Jamaican E.T.	Lee "Scratch" Perry
2003	Anything for You	Freddie McGregor
2003	Ghetto Dictionary: The Mystery	Bounty Killer
2003	Merci	Alpha Blondy
2003	Still Blazin'	Capleton
2004
2004	Dutty Rock	Sean Paul
2004	Ain't Givin' Up	Third World
2004	Free Man	Burning Spear
2004	Friends for Life	Buju Banton
2004	No Holding Back	Wayne Wonder
2005
2005	True Love	Toots and the Maytals
2005	African Holocaust	Steel Pulse
2005	Black Magic	Jimmy Cliff
2005	Def Jamaica	Various Artists
2005	The Dub Revolutionaries	Sly and Robbie
2006
2006	Welcome to Jamrock	Damian Marley
2006	Black Gold & Green	Third World
2006	Clothes Drop	Shaggy
2006	Our Music	Burning Spear
2006	The Trinity	Sean Paul
2007
2007	Love Is My Religion	Ziggy Marley
2007	Rhythm Doubles	Sly and Robbie
2007	Too Bad	Buju Banton
2007	Who You Fighting For?	UB40
2007	Youth	Matisyahu
2008
2008	Mind Control	Stephen Marley
2008	Anniversary	Sly and Robbie and the Taxi Gang
2008	The Burning Spear Experience	Burning Spear
2008	The End of an American Dream	Lee "Scratch" Perry
2008	Light Your Light	Toots and the Maytals
2009
2009	Jah Is Real	Burning Spear
2009	Amazing	Sly and Robbie
2009	Intoxication	Shaggy
2009	Let's Get Physical	Elephant Man
2009	Repentance	Lee "Scratch" Perry
2009	Vibes	Heavy D

=== 2010s ===
Year^{[I]}	Work	Performing artist(s)
2010
2010	Mind Control – Acoustic	Stephen Marley
2010	Awake	Julian Marley
2010	Brand New Me	Gregory Isaacs
2010	Imperial Blaze	Sean Paul
2010	Rasta Got Soul	Buju Banton
2011
2011	Before the Dawn	Buju Banton
2011	Isaacs Meets Isaac	Gregory Isaacs and King Isaac
2011	Legacy: An Acoustic Tribute to Peter Tosh	Andrew Tosh
2011	Made in Jamaica	Bob Sinclar and Sly and Robbie
2011	One Pop Reggae +	Sly and Robbie and the Family Taxi
2011	Revelation	Lee "Scratch" Perry
2012
2012	Revelation Pt. 1 – The Root of Life	Stephen Marley
2012	Harlem-Kingston Express Live!	Monty Alexander
2012	Reggae Knights	Israel Vibration
2012	Summer in Kingston	Shaggy
2012	Wild and Free	Ziggy Marley
2013
2013	Rebirth	Jimmy Cliff
2013	Miracle	The Original Wailers
2013	New Legend – Jamaica 50th Edition	Sly and Robbie and the Jam Masters
2013	Reggae Got Soul: Unplugged on Strawberry Hill	Toots and the Maytals
2013	Tomahawk Technique	Sean Paul
2014
2014	In Concert	Ziggy Marley
2014	The Messiah	Sizzla
2014	One Love, One Life	Beres Hammond
2014	Reggae Connection	Sly and Robbie and the Jam Masters
2014	Reincarnated	Snoop Lion
2015
2015	Fly Rasta	Ziggy Marley
2015	Amid the Noise and the Haste	SOJA
2015	Back on the Controls	Lee "Scratch" Perry
2015	Full Frequency	Sean Paul
2015	Out of Many, One Music	Shaggy
2015	The Reggae Power	Sly and Robbie and Spicy Chocolate
2016
2016	Strictly Roots	Morgan Heritage
2016	Acousticalevy	Barrington Levy
2016	Branches of the Same Tree	Rocky Dawuni
2016	The Cure	Jah Cure
2016	Zion Awake	Luciano
2017
2017	Ziggy Marley	Ziggy Marley
2017	Everlasting	Raging Fyah
2017	Falling Into Place	Rebelution
2017	Live in Virginia	SOJA
2017	Rose Petals	J Boog
2017	Sly & Robbie Presents... Reggae for Her	Devin Di Dakta and J.L
2018
2018	Stony Hill	Damian "Jr. Gong" Marley
2018	Avrakedabra	Morgan Heritage
2018	Chronology	Chronixx
2018	Lost in Paradise	Common Kings
2018	Wash House Ting	J Boog
2019
2019	44/876	Sting and Shaggy
2019	As the World Turns	Black Uhuru
2019	A Matter of Time	Protoje
2019	Rebellion Rises	Ziggy Marley
2019	Reggae Forever	Etana

=== 2020s ===
Year^{[I]}	Work	Performing artist(s)
2020
2020	Rapture	Koffee
2020	As I Am	Julian Marley
2020	The Final Battle: Sly & Robbie vs. Roots Radics	Sly and Robbie and the Roots Radics
2020	Mass Manipulation	Steel Pulse
2020	More Work to Be Done	Third World
2021
2021	Got to Be Tough	Toots and the Maytals
2021	Higher Place	Skip Marley
2021	It All Comes Back to Love	Maxi Priest
2021	One World	The Wailers
2021	Upside Down 2020	Buju Banton
2022
2022	Beauty in the Silence	SOJA
2022	Live N Livin	Sean Paul
2022	Pamoja	Etana
2022	Positive Vibration	Gramps Morgan
2022	Royal	Jesse Royal
2022	10	Spice
2023
2023	The Kalling	Kabaka Pyramid
2023	Com Fly Wid Mi	Shaggy
2023	Gifted	Koffee
2023	Scorcha	Sean Paul
2023	Third Time's The Charm	Protoje
2024
2024	Colors of Royal	Julian Marley and Antaeus
2024	Born for Greatness	Buju Banton
2024	Call Roots Riddim 2023	Collie Buddz
2024	No Destroyer	Burning Spear
2024	Simma	Beenie Man
2025
2025	Bob Marley: One Love – Music Inspired by the Film (Deluxe)	Various Artists
2025	Evolution	The Wailers
2025	Never Gets Late Here	Shenseea
2025	Party with Me	Vybz Kartel
2025	Take It Easy	Collie Buddz
2026
2026	Blxxd & Fyah	Keznamdi
2026	From Within	Mortimer
2026	Heart & Soul	Vybz Kartel
2026	No Place Like Home	Jesse Royal
2026	Treasure Self Love	Lila Iké
2027	Too Too Bad	Buju Banton
2027	Exile	Chronixx
2027	Brightside	Ziggy Marley
2027	The Art of Acceptance	Protoje
2027	Supernova	Runkus
2027	Lottery	Shaggy

^{^[I]} Each year is linked to the article about the Grammy Awards held that year.

== 2010 controversy ==
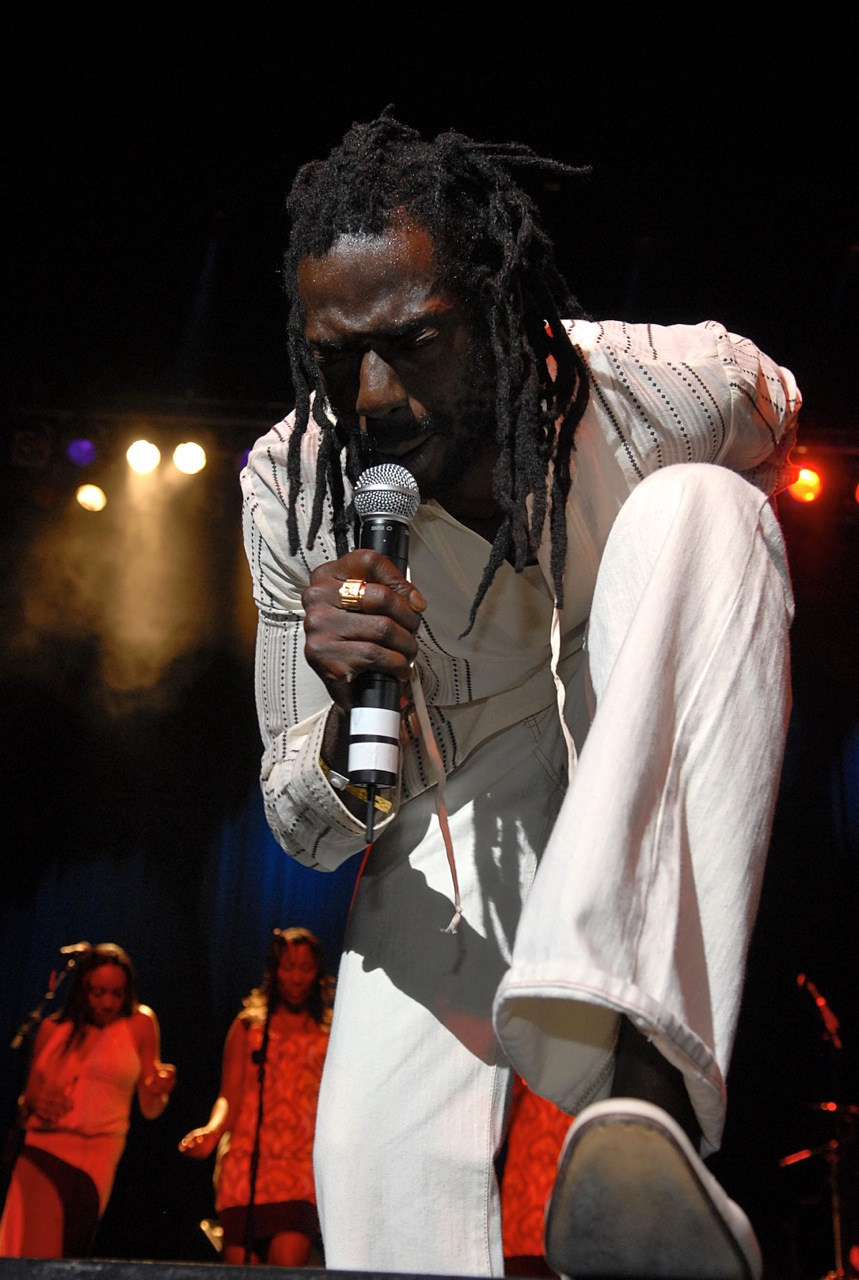
2010 nominee and subject of controversy Buju Banton, performing in 2007

Buju Banton's (real name Mark Anthony Myrie) nomination for the 2010 award for his album Rasta Got Soul sparked controversy and protest due to homophobic lyrics within his music. Banton's most controversial song, released in 1988, is "Boom, Bye Bye", which "promote[s] the murder of gay men by shooting or burning". Following the artist's nomination (which came 11 years after his first nomination in 1999) , the Gay & Lesbian Alliance Against Defamation and the Los Angeles Gay and Lesbian Center placed an advertisement in the Daily Variety encouraging Grammy officials to denounce music that "promotes or celebrates violence against any group of people". The advertisement, which took the form of a letter signed by gay rights and civil rights activists, asserted that honoring Banton was awarding "extraordinary hateful work". The National Academy of Recording Arts and Sciences responded by insisting that artists are honored for quality music "regardless of politics". Banton has been quoted as saying that he sees "no end to the war" between himself and gay men. The 2010 award was presented to Stephen Marley. Banton subsequently did win the Grammy in 2011 for the album Before the Dawn. As of 2027, Banton has received eight nominations. Other reggae musicians that have been accused of promoting anti-gay lyrics include Beenie Man, Elephant Man, Shabba Ranks and Sizzla.

== See also ==
- List of reggae musicians
- List of roots reggae artists
- List of ska musicians
- Music of Jamaica
- Reggae genres
