= Resistance (Burning Spear album) =

Studio album by Burning Spear
- Released: 1985
- Studio: Tuff Gong Studio Recording (Kingston, Jamaica)
- Genre: Roots reggae
- Length: 36:43
- Label: Heartbeat Records
- Producer: Burning Spear; Nelson Miller

Burning Spear chronology
The Fittest of the Fittest (1983)	Resistance (1985)	People of the World (1986)

Professional ratings
Review scores
Source	Rating
AllMusic	4.5/5 stars
The Encyclopedia of Popular Music	4/5 stars

Resistance is a studio album by Jamaican reggae singer Burning Spear. It was released in 1985 through Heartbeat Records, making it the artist's first release for the label. Recording sessions took place at Tuff Gong Recording Studio in Kingston, horns on "Jah Feeling" and "Mek We Yadd" were recorded at Aquarius Studios Kingston.

It was nominated for a Grammy Award for Best Reggae Recording at the 27th Annual Grammy Awards.

== Track listing ==
All tracks are written by Winston Rodney, except track 4 written with Noel Hamil.

No.	Title	Length
1.	"Resistance"	4:13
2.	"Mek We Yadd"	4:11
3.	"Holy Foundation"	3:39
4.	"Queen of the Mountain"	3:40
5.	"The Force"	3:43
6.	"Jah Say"	4:22
7.	"We Been There"	4:08
8.	"Jah Feeling"	4:27
9.	"Love to You"	4:20
Total length:		36:43

== Personnel ==
- Winston Rodney – vocals, akete, producer
- Richard Anthony Johnson – keyboards, piano, organ, Casio MT-40, Fender Rhodes
- Bobby Kalphat – organ
- Winston Wright – piano, clarinet
- Robert Lyn – synthesizer
- Peter Ashbourne – Prophet-5 synthesizer
- Lenford Richard – lead guitar
- Devon Bradshaw – rhythm guitar
- Michael Wilson – lead & rhythm guitar
- Anthony Bradshaw – bass
- Nelson Miller – drums, fundé, co-producer
- Alvin Haughton – percussion
- Dean Fraser – saxophone
- Herman Marquis – saxophone
- Glen DaCosta – tenor saxophone (track 2)
- Ronald "Nambo" Robinson – trombone
- Calvin "Bubbles" Cameron – trombone
- Barrington Xavier Bailey – trombone
- Leslie Wint – trumpet, flugelhorn
- David Madden – trumpet
- Junior "Chico" Chin – trumpet (track 7)
- Errol Brown – recording
- Jack Nuber – mixing
- Mervyn Williams – assistant engineering (tracks: 2, 8)
- Christopher Lewis – assistant engineering
- David Young – assistant mixing
- Wicked and Wild – art concept and photography
