= Andrew Tosh =

- Born: Carlos Andrew McIntosh; 19 June 1967 (age 59)
- Origin: Kingston, Jamaica
- Genres: Reggae
- Instruments: Vocals, Piano, Guitar and Kete drum
- Label: Box 10 / House of Tosh

Andrew Tosh (born Carlos Andrew McIntosh, 19 June 1967) is a Jamaican reggae singer and the son of Peter Tosh. He is the nephew of reggae singer Bunny Wailer, also an original member of the Wailers. Andrew has a strong vocal resemblance to his late father and like his father, rides the unicycle.

== Biography ==
Tosh was exposed to the music of his father's group the Wailers from an early age, his mother, Shirley Livingston, also being the sister of Bunny Wailer and half-sister of Claudette Pearl Livingston by Cedella Booker, the mother of the Wailers' third member, Bob Marley. His first recording session was in 1985, produced by Charlie Chaplin, and resulting in the single "Vanity Love". After his father was shot dead in 1987, he performed two songs at his funeral, "Jah Guide" and "Equal Rights".

He moved on to work with producer Winston Holness on his debut album, Original Man on ROHIT Records. This was followed in 1989 by a second album, Make Place for the Youth, which was recorded in the United States and was nominated for a Grammy Award for Best Reggae Album.

He toured with the Wailers Band in 1991.

In 2004, he recorded an album of songs by his father, Andrew Sings Tosh: He Never Died.

In 2007, he announced that he was working on his fourth studio album, Focus.

2010, he released an acoustic album dedicated to his father, Legacy: An Acoustic Tribute to Peter Tosh produced by himself, his girlfriend Dawn Simpson and legendary Handel Tucker. The album features a duet with Andrew and Kymani Marley a rendition of "Lessons in My Life" and a song entitled "I Am" which features Bunny Wailer. The album was nominated for a 2011 Grammy for Best Reggae Album.

In 2011, he announced that he was working on a new album titled Eye to Eye, featuring Kymani Marley and other guest artists, expecting a 2012 release date.

== Albums ==
- Original Man (1987) ROHIT
- Make Place for the Youth (1989) Tomato
- Message From Jah (2000) Dressed to Kill
- Andrew Tosh (2001) Dressed to Kill
- Andrew Sings Tosh: He Never Died (2004) Paras
- Legacy: An Acoustic Tribute To Peter Tosh (2010) Box 10 Entertainment / Tuff Gong
- Eye to Eye (2013)

== Film and video ==
- Peter Tosh Band with Andrew Tosh: Live
