= Lázaro Ros =

Afro-Cuban singer

Lázaro Ros (May 11, 1925 – February 8, 2005) was an Afro-Cuban singer. His music borrowed much from Africa, as he performed music of the Lucumí culture, of the Yoruba people from modern-day Nigeria, and of the Arará culture of the Dahomean people from modern-day Benin. Ros was largely self-taught, and first learned to sing by learning the chants associated with Santería, a religion based in the Lucumí and Arará cultures.

== Life ==
Ros was born in the Santos Suárez district of Havana, Cuba. He began to work at the age of 11 distributing milk. At the age of 13 he began to sing at religious festivities, or fiesta de santo. His first major employment as a musician was in 1949, where he sang on Sunday afternoons for the radio station, RHC-Cadena Azul. After the 1959 revolution, he received international acclaim with the Conjunto Folklórico Nacional de Cuba (or National Folkloric Ensemble of Cuba) which allowed him to travel to Mexico, France, Spain, and the United States. He also worked at the Cuban Institute of Ethnology and Folklore. He is recognized as a founder of Afro-Cuban rock due to his work with the Síntesis and their album, Ancestros (Ancestors). He also recorded with a group called Olorun. In the year of his death, he was awarded the Orden Félix Varela First Degree, Cuba's highest cultural honour.

Ros's orisha in the yoruba religion was Oggun. He would later become the Akpwon Mayor, and an Oriate.

== Discography ==
Contributing artist

- The Rough Guide to the Music of Cuba (1998, World Music Network)
- The Rough Guide To Voodoo (2013, World Music Network)
