= Rhythm Doubles =

Studio album by Sly and Robbie
- Released: September 19, 2006
- Genre: Reggae
- Label: Rootdown Records

Rhythm Doubles is a studio album by Sly and Robbie. It was nominated for Best Reggae Album at the 49th Annual Grammy Awards (held on February 11, 2007).

== Track listing ==
1. "El Cumbanchero" - 5:12 featuring the Taxi Gang
2. "Bounce" - 4:18 featuring Wyclef Jean & Bounty Killer
3. "Memories" - Ghetto Heaven"-3:52 featuring Mitch & Scantana
4. "Walk Out" - 3:47 featuring Elephant Man
5. "Liar" - 4:04 featuring Lady Saw
6. "Black People" - 3:25 featuring Bounty Killer
7. "Party Hot" - 4:01 featuring Conrad Crystal, Suga Roy & Yellowman
8. "My Girl" - 3:56 featuring Chaka Demus & Pliers
9. "Love Sound" - 5:04 featuring Alaine & Beres Hammond
10. "Star" - 3:53 featuring T.O.K.
11. "There for You" - 4:54 featuring Annette Brissett & Beres Hammond
12. "Milk & Honey" - 4:02 featuring Ali Campbell & Luciano
13. "Heavy Load" - 3:54 featuring Ras Abijah
14. "Just to Know" - 4:00 featuring Maxi Priest
15. "Big Up" - 4:04 featuring Wayne Marshall
16. "Searching" - 4:47 featuring Trini
17. "Mango Tongo" - 4:17 featuring the Taxi Gang
18. "Sun Shine" (bonus track) - 3:56 featuring T.O.K.
