= The World Should Know (Burning Spear album) =

Studio album by Burning Spear
- Released: 1993
- Genre: Reggae
- Label: Hearbeat
- Producers: Winston Rodney, Nelson Miller

Burning Spear chronology
Jah Kingdom (1991)	The World Should Know (1993)	Rasta Business (1995)

Alternative cover
- Burning Music release

The World Should Know is a studio album by the Jamaican reggae singer Burning Spear, released in 1993. It was nominated for a Grammy Award for Best Reggae Album at the 36th Grammy Awards in 1994. Burning Spear supported the album with a North American tour.

== Production ==
The album was produced by Winston Rodney and Nelson Miller.

== Critical reception ==
Professional ratings
Review scores
Source	Rating
AllMusic	4.5/5 stars
Robert Christgau	(neither)
The Encyclopedia of Popular Music	3/5 stars
Los Angeles Times	3/4 stars

Newsday noted that "the roots of Spear's heavily rhythmic and deeply spiritual music lie in the insistent patterns of Jamaica's Nyabinghi drummers, which Spear's Burning Band translates into solid drumming and playfully ornamental percussion." The Gazette deemed the album "embarrassingly short on substance and originality." The Los Angeles Times wrote: "This consummately crafted collection features taut, muscular riddims, contemporary keyboard swirls and strong, jazzy horn lines behind Spear's inimitable village-elder voice delivering love songs and his perennial theme of personal identity."

== Track listing ==
1. "The World Should Know"
2. "In a Time Like Now"
3. "I Stand Strong"
4. "Identity"
5. "It's Not a Crime"
6. "Mi Gi Dem" (I Give Them)
7. "Loving Day"
8. "Sweeter Than Chocolate"
9. "On the Inside"
10. "Peace"

== Personnel ==
- Winston Rodney - vocals, percussion
- Nelson Miller - drums
- Paul Beckford - bass
- Lenford Richards - lead guitar, Casio PG 380
- Lenval Jarrett - rhythm guitar
- Alvin Haughton - percussion

Additional musicians

- Robbie Lyn - keyboards
- Nambo Robinson - trombone
- Chico Chin - trumpet
- Dean Fraser - saxes
- Charles Dickey - trombone
- James Smith - trumpet
- Mark Wilson - saxophone
- Sharon Forrester - harmony
- Pam Hall - harmony
- Marie "Twiggi" Gittens - harmony

Credits

- All songs written by Winston Rodney
- Published by Burning Spear Publishing
- Executive producer - Burning Music Production
- Recorded Grove Recording Studio, White River, Ocho Rios.
- Recording Engineer: Barry O'Hare
- Assistant Engineer: Andrew Thomas.
- Mixed by Michael Sauvage.
- Mixed at Platinum Island Studio, New York.
- Assistant: Mervyn Williams.
- Studio Assistant Axel Niehaus.
- Mastered at Northeast Digital by Toby Mountain.
