= Gangbé Brass Band =

Beninese musical ensemble

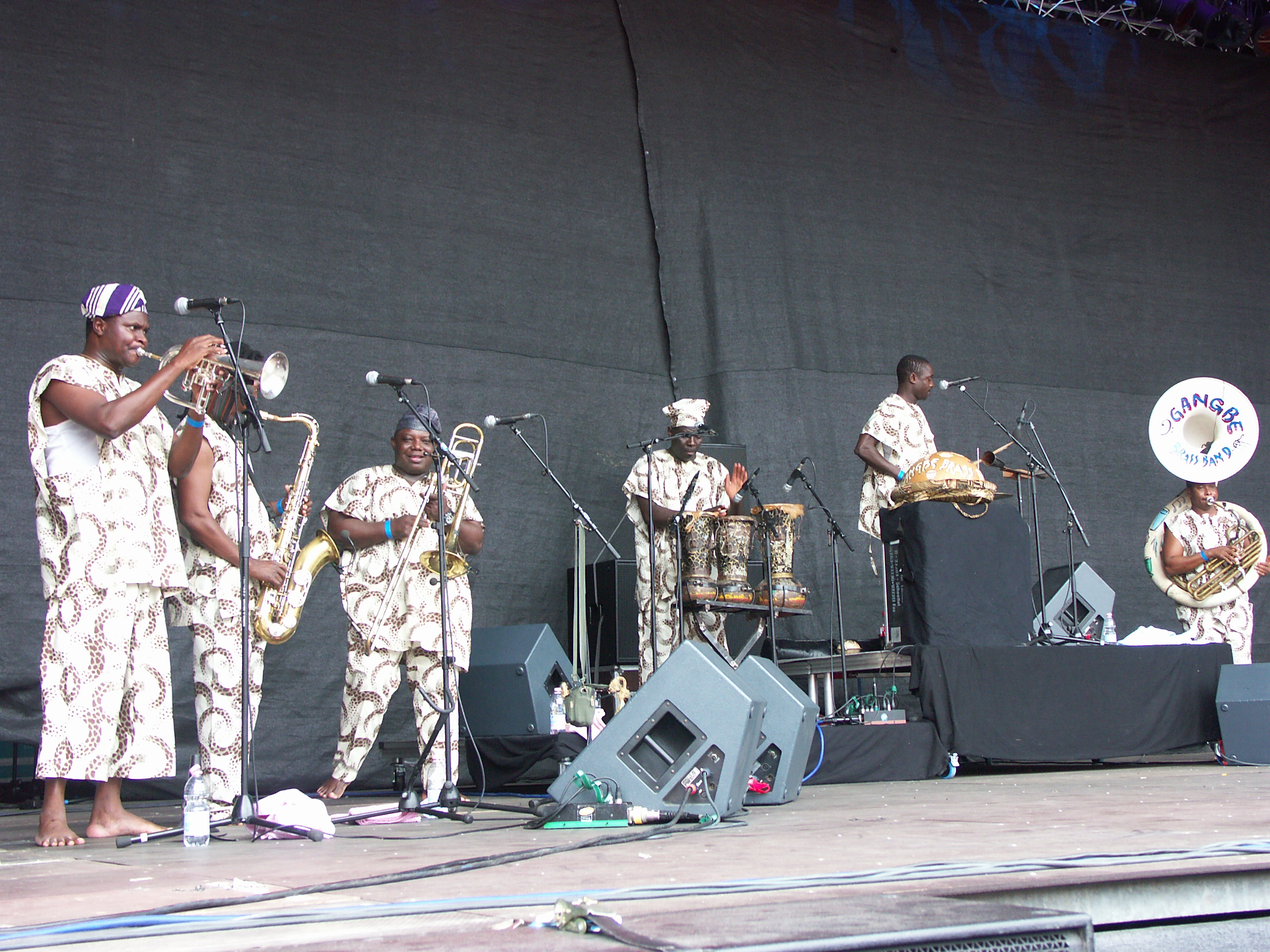
Gangbé Brass Band at the 2009 Nuremberg Bardentreffen

The Gangbé Brass Band is a 10-member Beninese musical ensemble founded in 1994. The word "gangbe" means "sound of metal" in the Fon language. They blend West African jùjú and traditional Vodou music with Western jazz and big-band sounds. Their unusual instrumentation---trumpet, trombone, and sousaphone, along with West African percussion and vocals---is, to some extent, part of West Africa's colonial legacy; French colonial officers imported brass instruments and trained local musicians to play European-style military and dance hall music. Gangbe has released five albums: "Gangbe" (1998), "Togbe" (2001), "Whendo" (2004), "Assiko" (2008), and "Go slow to Lagos" (2015) and tours extensively in Europe and North America.

== Discography ==
Albums

- Gangbe (1998)
- Togbe (2001)
- Whendo (2004)
- Assiko (2008)
- Go Slow to Lagos (2015)

Contributing artist

- Cicada (2011)
- The Rough Guide To Voodoo (2012)
- Celia (Angelique Kidjo album) (2019)
