= Jah Is Real =

Album by Burning Spear

Studio album by Burning Spear
- Released: August 19, 2008
- Studio: Magic Shop, New York City
- Genre: Roots reggae
- Length: 1:08:46
- Label: Burning Music
- Producer: Burning Music Production

Burning Spear chronology
The Burning Spear Experience (2007)	Jah Is Real (2008)	Living Dub Vol. 6 (2008)

Singles from Jah Is Real
- 1. "The Cruise" Released: 2008

Professional ratings
Review scores
Source	Rating
AllMusic	4/5 stars
PopMatters	6/10 stars

Jah Is Real is a studio album by Jamaican reggae singer Burning Spear. It was released on August 19, 2008, through Burning Music. The recording sessions took place at the Magic Shop in New York City.

The album peaked at number 3 on the Reggae Albums chart in the United States. It won the Grammy Award for Best Reggae Album at the 51st Annual Grammy Awards in 2009.

== Track listing ==
All tracks are written by Winston Rodney.

No.	Title	Length
1.	"The Cruise"	4:38
2.	"Step It"	8:10
3.	"You Were Wrong"	4:56
4.	"Run for Your Life"	6:29
5.	"Jah Is Real"	4:06
6.	"People in High Places"	4:23
7.	"One Africa"	4:56
8.	"Grandfather"	3:54
9.	"Wickedness"	4:54
10.	"Stick to the Plan"	4:29
11.	"No Compromise"	4:17
12.	"700 Strong"	4:31
13.	"Grassroot"	4:22
14.	"Step It Remix"	4:41
Total length:		1:08:46

== Personnel ==
- Winston Rodney – vocals, percussion
- "Lady" Peachena Eure – backing vocals
- Marie Della Thomas – backing vocals
- Joanne Williams – backing vocals
- The Late Show's Gospel Choir – backing vocals
- Kennedy Simmonds – keyboards
- William Berlind – keyboards
- Lawrence Lewis – keyboards
- Michael Hyde – keyboards
- George Bernard Worrell, Jr. – keyboards (tracks: 2, 3, 6, 9, 11)
- Brian Thorn – lead guitar, engineering
- Andrew Hobby Bassford – lead guitar
- Donovan McKitty – lead guitar
- Cecil Ordonez – lead guitar
- Ian "Beezy" Coleman – rhythm guitar
- Linford Carby – rhythm guitar
- David Rekhley – bass
- I Palmer – bass
- William Earl "Bootsy" Collins – bass (tracks: 2, 3, 6, 9)
- Mr. Handgroove – bass guitar (track 14)
- Howard Smith – drums
- Num Heru-ur Shutef Amon'Tehu – percussion
- "Blessed" Donald Toney – saxophone
- Gerald "Jerry" Johnson – saxophone
- Jason Jackson – trombone
- Kevin Batchelor – trumpet
- Donovan "Snakie" Simmonds – additional engineering
- Ted Young – additional engineering
- Michael John – additional engineering
- Chris Gehringer – mastering
- Alexei Afonin – photography

== Chart history ==
Chart (2008)	Peak position
US Reggae Albums (Billboard)	3
