= Nelson Miller =

Jamaican drummer and record producer (1954–2019)

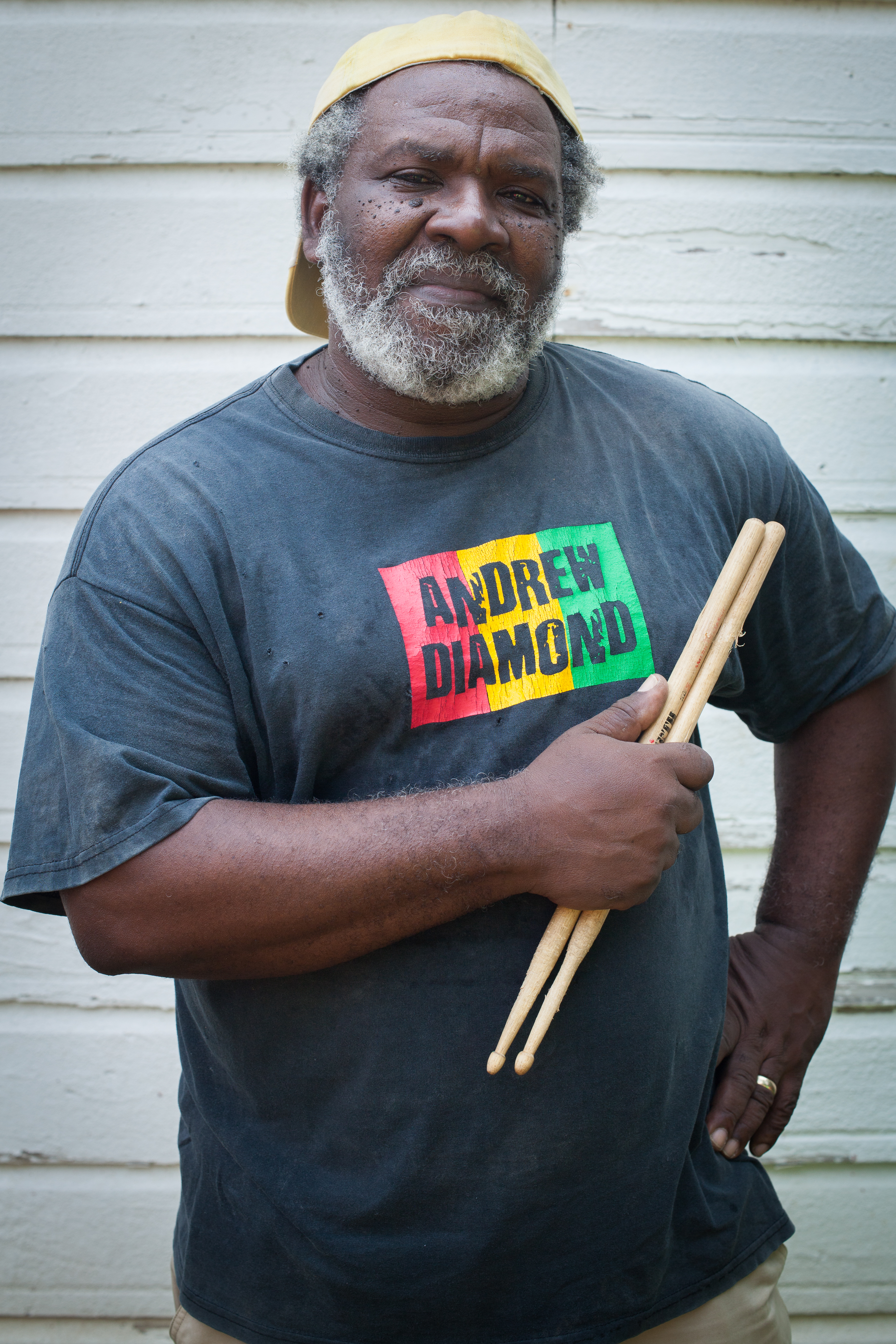
Nelson Miller at SR Music Studio, Kingston, Jamaica

Nelson Miller (12 November 1954 – 30 June 2019) was a Jamaican drummer and record producer. Miller was born and raised in Port Antonio. Influenced by Lloyd Knibb, Carlton "Santa" Davis, and Mikey "Boo" Richards, he began playing in bands in Port Antonio as a teenager.

He has played on and produced many Burning Spear albums since the late 1970s, including the Grammy Award nominated Resistance. He also led the band The Two Ton Machine, releasing the album Chinatown in 1985.

He later recorded with Clinton Fearon of The Gladiators, and in the Solid Foundation Band, working with Prezident Brown.

Miller unexpectedly took ill the morning of 30 June 2019 and was taken to the hospital. He died later that evening. Actual cause of death remains unknown.
