= Burning Spear =

Jamaican musician (born 1945)

Burning Spear OD
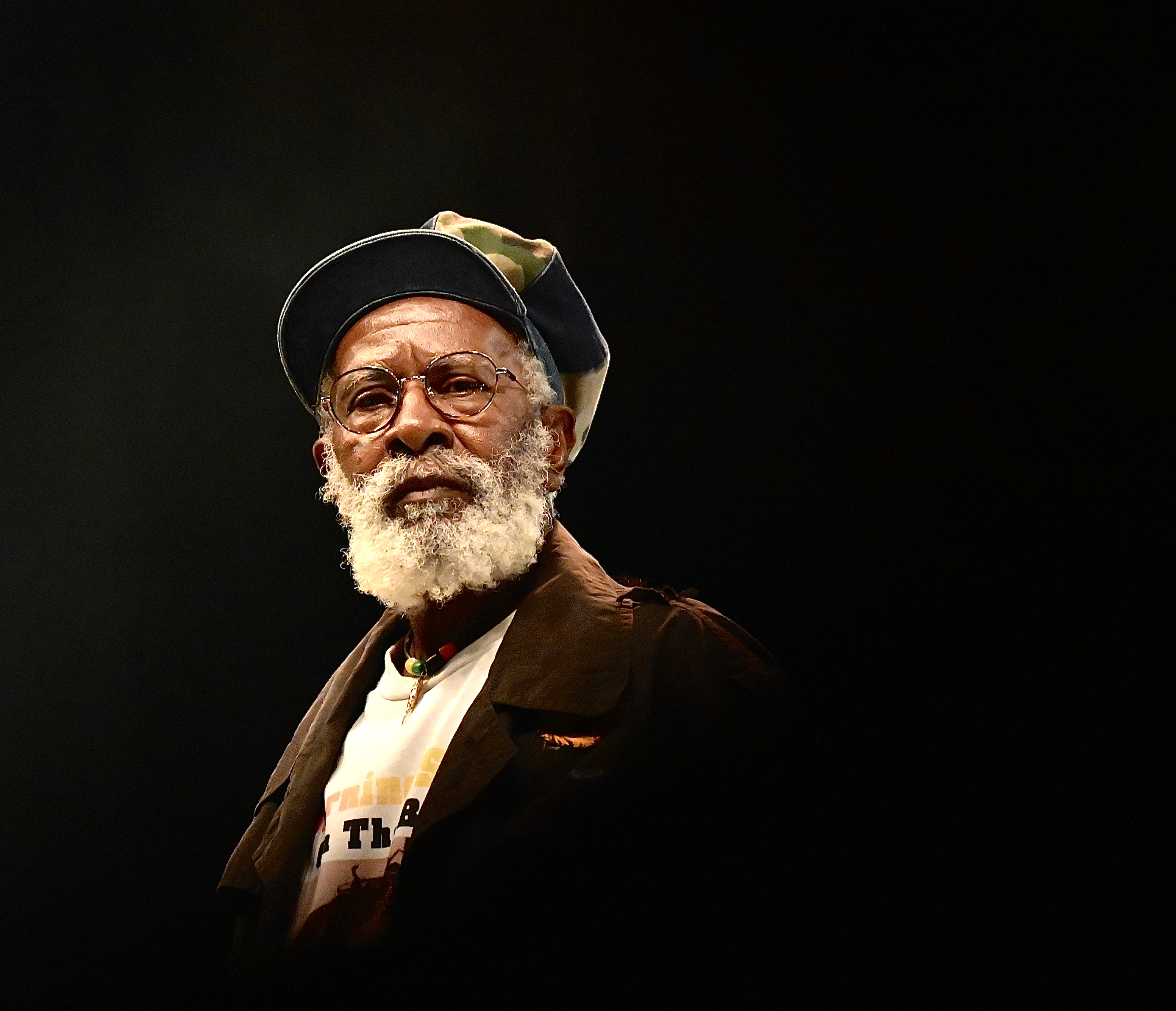
- Burning Spear live at Reggae Geel, Belgium, in 2023

Background information
- Born: Winston Rodney; 1 March 1945 (age 81); Saint Ann's Bay, Saint Ann, Jamaica
- Genres: Reggae; roots reggae; dub
- Years active: 1969–present
- Labels: Studio One; Island; EMI; Heartbeat; Slash; Warner Bros.; Burning
- Website: burningspearwebsite.com

Winston Rodney OD (born 1 March 1945), better known by the stage name Burning Spear, is a Jamaican roots reggae singer-songwriter, vocalist, and musician. Burning Spear is a Rastafarian and one of the most influential and long-standing roots artists to emerge from the 1970s.

== Early life ==
Winston Rodney was born in Saint Ann's Bay, Saint Ann, Jamaica. He is married to Sonia Rodney. As a young man he listened to the R&B, soul and jazz music transmitted by the US radio stations whose broadcasts reached Jamaica. Curtis Mayfield is cited by Rodney as a major US musical influence along with James Brown. Rodney was deeply influenced as a young man by the views of the political activist Marcus Garvey, especially with regard to the exploration of the themes of Pan-Africanism and self-determination. In 1969, Bob Marley, who was also from Saint Ann, advised Rodney to approach Coxsone Dodd's Studio One label after Rodney sought his advice during a casual conversation.

== Career ==
Burning Spear was originally Rodney's group, named after a military award given by Jomo Kenyatta, the first President of an independent Kenya, and included bass singer Rupert Willington. The duo auditioned for Dodd in 1969 which led to the release of their debut single "Door Peep" (the session also included Cedric Brooks on saxophone). They were then joined by tenor Delroy Hinds. The trio recorded several more singles for Dodd, and two albums, before leaving Studio One in 1974. Rodney later became disillusioned with both the label and the Jamaican music industry, returning to his native Saint Ann, where he worked as a farmer. In early 1975, he began working with Jack Ruby, operator of the Ocho Rios–based Hi-Power sound system. Their first recording with Ruby, "Marcus Garvey", was intended as an exclusive track for Hi-Power, but was released as a single, giving them an immediate hit, and was followed by "Slavery Days". These recordings featured the backing band The Black Disciples, which included Earl "Chinna" Smith, Valentine Chin, Robbie Shakespeare and Leroy Wallace. The group worked with Ruby on their third album, Marcus Garvey (1975), which was immediately successful and led to a deal with Island Records to give the album a wider release. Island remixed and altered the speed of some of the tracks, much to the annoyance of fans and the group, leading Rodney to set up his own Burning Music label for future releases where he would have full control, although further releases followed on Island including Garvey's Ghost, a dub version of the Marcus Garvey album, and Man in the Hills. In late 1976, Rodney split from both Ruby and group members Willington and Hinds, and from that point on used the name Burning Spear for himself alone. Dry and Heavy followed in 1977, self-produced but still on Island, and with a sizeable following by now in the United Kingdom, he performed in London that year with members of Aswad acting as his backing band for a sold-out show at the Rainbow Theatre, which was recorded and released as the album Live!. Aswad also provided backing on his next studio album, Social Living (1978), which also featured Sly Dunbar and Rico Rodriguez. A dub version of the album, Living Dub (1979), was mixed by Sylvan Morris. His profile was raised further by an appearance in the film Rockers, performing "Jah no Dead".

In 1980, Rodney left Island Records and set up the Burning Music Production Company, which he signed to EMI, debuting on the label with Hail H.I.M., recorded at Marley's Tuff Gong studio and co-produced by Aston Barrett. A Sylvan Morris dub version followed in the form of Living Dub Volume Two. In 1982, Rodney signed with Heartbeat Records with a series of well-received albums following, including the 1985 Grammy-nominated Resistance. He returned to Island in the early 1990s, releasing two albums before rejoining Heartbeat. This arrangement in which Burning Music Productions delivered completed albums of music to EMI, Island and Heartbeat Records for worldwide distribution lasted for many years. When Heartbeat ceased releasing new material, Burning Music took matters into their own hands and began to release music solely through their own imprint. Albums released by Heartbeat through an agreement with Burning Music include: The World Should Know (1993), Rasta Business (1995), and Appointment with His Majesty (1997).

Burning Spear spent decades touring extensively, and several live albums have been issued including Burning Spear Live, Live in Paris, Live in South Africa, Live in Vermont, Peace and Love Live, Live at Montreux Jazz Festival and (A)live 1997. Touring the world time and time again, the band's live sound matured and grew more sophisticated. While remaining firmly rooted in reggae, accents of free jazz, funk and psychedelic music were increasingly in evidence.

His 1999 album, Calling Rastafari brought his first Grammy Award in 2000, a feat which he repeated with Jah Is Real in 2009. In 2000 Home to My Roots Tour he performed in Cape Town, South Africa, alongside another reggae musician Joseph Hill with Culture. In 2002 he and his wife, Sonia Rodney who has produced a number of his albums, restarted Burning Music Records, giving him a greater degree of artistic control. Since the mid-1990s, he has been based in Queens in New York City. Burning Spear was awarded the Order of Distinction in the rank of Officer on 15 October 2007. Since establishing their own label, Winston and Sonia Rodney have released nearly 40 singles, CDs, DVDs and vinyl albums on the Burning Music imprint. Many of these albums have been deluxe editions of albums previously available on other labels and often include bonus tracks and DVD footage.

In 2016 Rodney announced his retirement, but in 2022 it was announced that he would perform at the Rototom Sunsplash festival in Spain, and on the 'Welcome to Jamrock' cruise in December.

Rodney announced three shows in California in July 2022: San Francisco on 22 July, San Diego on 23 July and Los Angeles on 24 July. He also announced a show at the Levitt Pavilion, Denver, Colorado on 30 July 2022. These shows were followed by dates at Forum Birmingham on 13 August and the O2 Academy, Brixton, London on 14 August. On 14 August 2023 he performed a show in the Barby Club live music venue in Tel Aviv, Israel and on 15 August 2023 in Megiddo, Israel where he appeared together with Ehud Banai.

== Awards ==
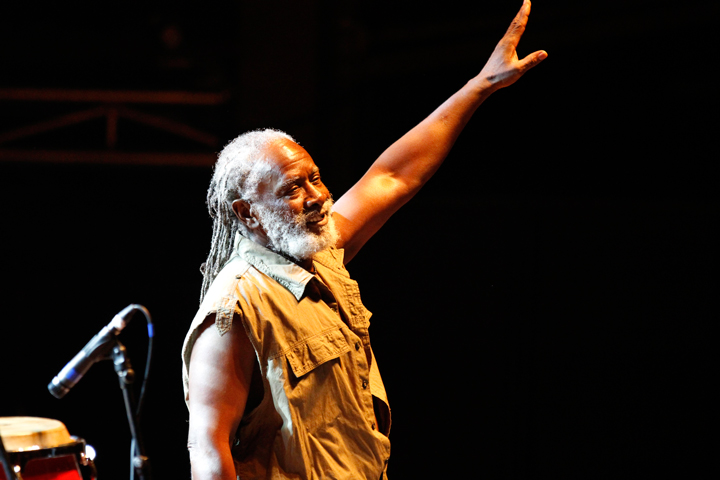
Burning Spear in 2013

Burning Spear has won two Grammy Awards for Best Reggae Album; one at the 42nd Grammy Awards in 2000 for Calling Rastafari, and one for 2009's Jah Is Real. He has been nominated for a total of 12 Grammy Awards.

Nominations for Grammy Award for Best Reggae Album:

- 1986 Resistance
- 1988 People of the World
- 1990 Live in Paris Zenith '88
- 1991 Mek We Dweet
- 1994 The World Should Know
- 1996 Rasta Business
- 1998 Appointment with His Majesty
- 2000 Calling Rastafari (winner)
- 2004 Free Man
- 2006 Our Music
- 2008 The Burning Spear Experience
- 2009 Jah Is Real (winner)
- 2024 No Destroyer
