= Burning Spear discography =

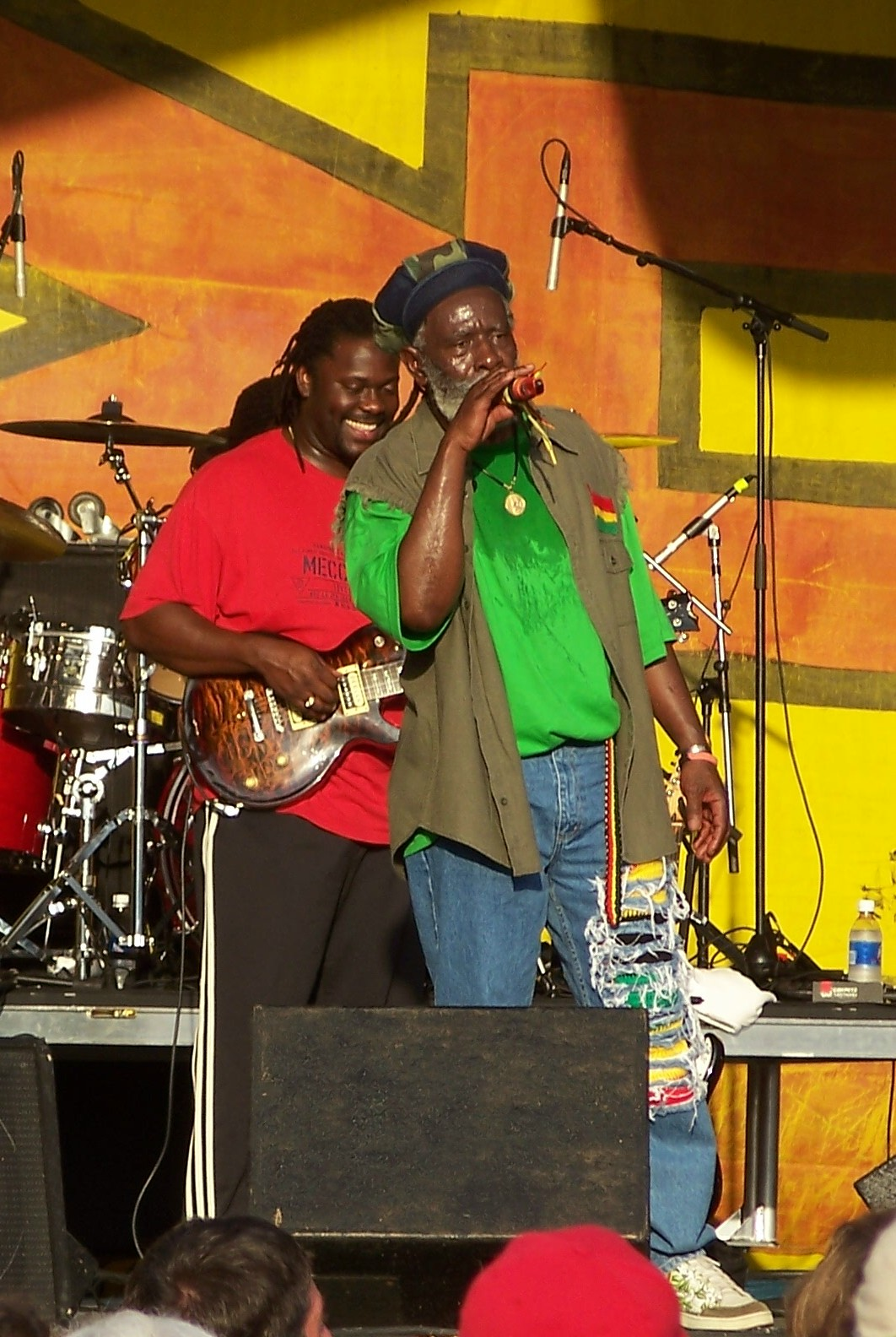
- Studio albums: 28
- Live albums: 6
- Compilation albums: 23

Reggae artist Burning Spear started his career in 1969. This article contains the discography of the artist's albums and singles.

== Albums ==
=== Studio albums ===
- Studio One Presents Burning Spear (1973), FAB
- Rocking Time (1974), FAB
- Marcus Garvey (1975), Island
- Garvey's Ghost (1976), Island
- Man in the Hills (1976), Island
- Dry & Heavy (1977), Island
- Social Living (1978), also released as Marcus' Children
- Living Dub Vol. 1 (1979), Rita Marley Music
- Hail H.I.M. (1980), Radic
- Living Dub Vol. 2 (1980), Rita Marley Music
- Farover (1982), Radic
- The Fittest of the Fittest (1983), Radic
- Resistance (1985), Heartbeat
- People of the World (1986), Greensleeves/Slash
- Mistress Music (1988), Greensleeves/Slash
- Mek We Dweet (1990), Mango
- Jah Kingdom (1991), Mango
- The World Should Know (1993), Heartbeat
- Rasta Business (1995), Heartbeat
- Living Dub Vol. 3 (1996), Declic
- Appointment with His Majesty (1997), Heartbeat
- Living Dub Vol. 4 (1998), Musidisc
- Calling Rastafari (1999), Heartbeat
- Free Man (2003), Nocturne
- Our Music (2005), Burning
- Living Dub Vol. 5 (2006), Collective
- Jah Is Real (2008), Burning
- Living Dub Vol. 6 (2008), Burning
- No Destroyer (2023), Burning

=== Live albums ===
- Live (1977), Island
- Live in Paris Zenith '88 (1989), Slash
- Love & Peace: Burning Spear Live! (1994), Heartbeat
- (A)live in Concert 97 (1998), Musidisc
- Live at Montreaux Jazz Festival 2001 (2001), Terra Firma
- Live in South Africa 2000 (2004), Revolver

=== Compilations ===
- Harder Than the Best (1979), Island
- Reggae Greats: Best of Island years 1975-1978 (1985), Island
- 100th Anniversary: Marcus Garvey/Garvey's Ghost (1987)
- The Fittest Selection: Greatest hits of 1980-1983 (1987), EMI
- Keep the Spear Burning (1989), Island
- The Original (1992), Sonic Sounds
- Chant Down Babylon The Island Anthology (1996), Island
- Best of Burning Spear (1999), Declic
- Ultimate Collection: Best of Collection (2001), Island
- Best of the Fittest: Best of Collection (2001), EMI
- Rare and Unreleased (2001)
- Spear Burning (2002), Pressure Sounds
- 20th Century Masters: The Millennium Collection: The Best of Burning Spear: Best of the Island years (2002), IMS
- Jah No Dead (2003)
- Creation Rebel (2004), Heartbeat
- Travelling (2004), Clocktower
- Sounds from the Burning Spear (2004), Soul Jazz
- Gold (2005)
- Rare and Unreleased (2006), Revolver
- The Burning Spear Experience (2007), Burning
- The Best of Burning Spear (2008), Virgin US
- Selection: The Fittest, Sonic Sounds
- The Best of Burning Spear: Marcus Garvey (2012), Island

== Singles ==
- "We Are Free" (1970), Bamboo - B-side of Irving Brown's "Let's Make It Up"
- "Zion Higher" (1971), Banana - B-side of King Cry Cry's "I Had a Talk"
- "Live It Out" (1971), Coxsone
- "Get Ready", (197?), Coxsone
- "Creation Rebel" (197?), Coxsone
- "Call on You" (197?), Coxsone
- "What a Happy Day" (197?), Coxsone
- "Rocking Time" (197?), Coxsone
- "Marcus Garvey" (197?), Fox
- "Slavery Days" (197?), Fox
- "Swell Headed"
- "Foggy Road"
- "Resting Place" (197?), Fox
- "Children of Today", Spear
- "The Youth" (197?), Spear
- "Old Marcus Garvey" (1976), Island
- "I & I Survive" (1976), Island
- "The Lion" (1976), Island
- "Civilised Reggae"/"Social Living" (1978), Island
- "She's Mine" (1982), Radic
- "Jah Is My Driver" (1982), Radic - 12-inch
- "Marcus Garvey" (1987), Island - 12-inch
- "Tell the Children" (1988), Blue Moon
- "Great Men" (1990), Mango
- "Free the Whole Wide World" (1994), Tribesman
- "Never" (2006), Collective
- "Education", Burning Spear
- "Travelling", Klassic Vinyl

Contributions

- "Perfect Day" (1997) - Various Artists charity single in aid of Children in Need

== DVD ==
- Home to My Roots (2004), Burning Music/Nocturne
- Live in Vermont (2008), Burning Music
- Live in Peru (2010)
- Rastafari Live (2012), Hudson Street
