= Man in the Hills =

Studio album by Burning Spear
- Released: August 18, 1976
- Studio: Randy's and Harry J's, Kingston, Jamaica
- Genre: Reggae
- Length: 33:53
- Label: Island
- Producer: Jack Ruby

Burning Spear chronology
Garvey's Ghost (1976)	Man in the Hills (1976)	Dry & Heavy (1977)

Professional ratings
Review scores
Source	Rating
AllMusic	4.5/5 stars
Christgau's Record Guide	B+
The Encyclopedia of Popular Music	4/5 stars
Rolling Stone	(Favorable)
PopMatters	(Favorable)

Man in the Hills is a reggae album by Jamaican musician Burning Spear (Winston Rodney), released in 1976 (see 1976 in music) on Island Records. Man in the Hills was follow-up to the seminal Marcus Garvey; Man in the Hills is usually considered a worthy follow-up, though less innovative and incendiary. produced by Jack Ruby, Man in the Hills is a simple and unadorned album, with songs that reminisce about Spear's childhood in St. Anne's Bay, Jamaica.

"Door Peep" was originally recorded in 1969 at Studio One after Spear ran into Bob Marley (also from St. Anne's Bay); Spear later quotes Marley "And Bob was going to his farm. The man was moving with a donkey and some buckets and a fork, and cutlass and plants. We just reason man-to-man and I-man say wherein I would like to get involved in the music business. And Bob say, 'All right, just check Studio One.' " The single was released but fared poorly on the Jamaican charts.

After Marcus Garvey, Spear's fame had grown considerably, and he was a star in Jamaica and cult sensation in the United Kingdom. Man in the Hills was a much quieter and more restrained album than its predecessor, and was more pastoral and dreamlike than militant and radical (though songs like "Is It Good" and "No More War" continue to address social issues).

"Man in the Hills", the titular album opener evokes the superiority of rural living over urban. In Jamaican history, the roots of radical protest, a national identity and the Rastafari movement, grew from communities formed by escaped slaves in the hills and (after emancipation in 1838) the so-called "Free Villages".

== Track listing ==
1. "Man in the Hills" (Rodney) – 4:00
2. "It's Good" (Phillip Fullwood, Rodney) – 2:45
3. "No More War" (Rodney) – 3:19
4. "Black Soul" (Rodney) – 3:25
5. "Lion" (Rodney) – 3:14
6. "People Get Ready" (Rodney) – 3:22
7. "Children" (Rodney) – 3:44
8. "Mother" (Rodney) – 3:37
9. "Door Peep" (Rodney) – 2:40
10. "Groovy" (Rodney) – 3:53

== Credits ==
- Winston Rodney – lead vocals and percussion
- Delroy Hines – harmony vocals
- Rupert Willington – harmony vocals
- Robbie Shakespeare – bass
- Aston "Family Man" Barrett – bass
- Leroy "Horsemouth" Wallace – drums
- Bernard "Touter" Harvey – keyboards
- Earl "Wire" Lindo – keyboards
- Tyrone "Organ D" Downie – keyboards
- Earl "Chinna" Smith – lead and rhythm guitar
- Tony Chin – rhythm guitar
- Bobby Ellis – trumpet
- Richard "Dirty Harry" Hall – tenor saxophone
- Herman Marquis – alto saxophone
- Vincent "Trommie" Gordon – trombone

Production

- Recorded at Randy's Recording Studio, North Parade; and Harry J Studio, Roosevelt Avenue, Kingston, Jamaica
- Original album design and illustration: Neville Garrick
