= Rockers (soundtrack) =

Soundtrack album by Various Artists
- Released: Mango November 29, 1979; Palm July 30, 2002
- Recorded: Various
- Genre: Reggae
- Label: Island Records
- Compiler: Chris Blackwell

Rockers is the soundtrack to the 1978 film of the same name. It was released in 1979 by Mango Records and includes some of the songs heard in the film by Jamaican reggae musicians such as Junior Murvin, Bunny Wailer, Burning Spear, Peter Tosh and Jacob Miller. A compact disc appeared in 2002 on the Palm label, a reissue imprint of Island Records.

== Critical reception ==
Professional ratings
Review scores
| Source | Rating |
|---|---|
| AllMusic | 5/5 stars |
| Robert Christgau | B+ |
| The Encyclopedia of Popular Music | 4/5 stars |
| MusicHound Soundtracks | 4/5 stars |
| The New Rolling Stone Record Guide | 5/5 stars |
| Rolling Stone | 4/5 stars |
| Martin C. Strong | 9/10 |

Martin C. Strong called the album "one of the best samplers of 70s reggae on the market, with an iconoclastic, end-of-an era feel". MusicHound Soundtracks opined that it is "a fine collection of artists and tunes," with "many of the giants of contemporary reggae," as well as "some lesser-known talents". Robert Christgau wrote: "First side's a smart reggae compilation, [...] side two's just honorable soundtrack". AllMusic claimed that "the soundtrack remains one of the most diverse yet coherent albums of the roots age". In 2024, Rolling Stone magazine named Rockers the 52nd greatest soundtrack of all time.

== Track listing ==
=== Side One ===
1. "We 'A' Rockers" (Ian Lewis, Bernard Harvey) – Inner Circle
2. "Money Worries" (Wilson) – The Maytones
3. "Police and Thieves" (Junior Murvin, Lee Perry) – Junior Murvin
4. "Book of Rules" (Barry Llewellyn, Harry Johnson) – The Heptones
5. "Stepping Razor" (Joe Higgs) – Peter Tosh
6. "Tenement Yard" (Jacob Miller, Roger Lewis) – Jacob Miller
7. "Fade Away" (Earl "Chinna" Smith) – Junior Byles

=== Side Two ===
1. "Rockers" (Neville Livingstone) – Bunny Wailer
2. "Slave Master" (Gregory Isaacs) – Gregory Isaacs
3. "Man in the Street" (Coxsone Dodd) – Rockers All Stars
4. "Graduation in Zion" (Frank Dowding) – Kiddus I
5. "Jah No Dead" (Winston Rodney) – Burning Spear
6. "Satta Massagana" (L. Manning, D. Manning, B. Collins) – Third World
7. "Natty Take Over" (Justin Hinds, Michael Roper) – Justin Hinds & the Dominoes

Note: Some versions replace "Man in the Street" with "Dread Lion" by Lee Perry & the Upsetters.

== Personnel ==
- Theodoros Bafaloukos – executive producer, art direction, logo design, photography
- Avrom Robin – executive producer, photography
- Chris Blackwell – soundtrack compilation

== Songs not included in the album ==
The following songs are heard in the film, but were not included in the released soundtrack album:

- "Satta Amasagana" – The Abyssinians with Ras Michael & the Sons of Negus (Nyabinghi version)
- "Man in the Street" – Rockers All Stars
- "Money Trouble" – The Maytones & I-Roy
- "Satta Amasagana" – Rockers All Stars
- "Stumbling Block" – Dillinger
- "Midnight Rock Live Dubplate (Answer Riddim, Channel One)" – Big Joe & Jah Thomas
- "Waiting for the Bus" – Rockers All Stars
- "Sweet Sensation" – The Melodians
- "Honeyball" – Rockers All Stars
- "Rockers" – Rockers All Stars
- "The Beating" – Rockers All Stars
- "Water is Power" – Mount Salem African Methodist Episcopal Zion Church
- "Get On Up (Get On Down)" – Roundtree (Disco-Funk)
- "Queen Majesty" – The Jays & Ranking Trevor
- "Treasure Dub" – Joe Gibbs & the Professionals
- "The Raid" – Rockers All Stars
