= Garvey's Ghost =

Studio album by Burning Spear
- Released: 1976
- Recorded: 1975
- Genres: Dub, reggae
- Length: 38:29
- Label: Island
- Producer: Lawrence Lindo

Burning Spear chronology
| Marcus Garvey (1975) | Garvey's Ghost (1976) | Man in the Hills (1976) |

Professional ratings
Review scores
| Source | Rating |
|---|---|
| AllMusic | 1.5/5 stars |
| Christgau's Record Guide | B+ |
| The Encyclopedia of Popular Music | 4/5 stars |
| The Rolling Stone Record Guide | 4/5 stars |

Garvey's Ghost is the fourth studio album by Jamaican reggae artist Burning Spear, released in 1976 on Island Records, ILPS 9382. Each track is a dub version of its correspondent song on his third album, Marcus Garvey.

== Content ==
The album was fashioned by Island Record engineers John Burns and Dick Cuthell in their Hammersmith studio. It features prominently the backing musicians, whom Lindo named the Black Disciples, assembled from members of the session group the Soul Syndicate and Bob Marley's touring band, the Wailers.

On July 27, 2010, the album was remastered and released by Universal's Hip-O Records reissue imprint in tandem with the original Marcus Garvey LP on one compact disc.

== Track listing ==
All tracks written by Winston Rodney and Phillip Fullwood except as indicated.

1. "The Ghost" — 3:56
2. "I and I Survive" — 3:55
3. "Black Wa-Da-Da" (W. Rodney, C. Paisley, P. Fullwood) — 3:53
4. "John Burns Skank" (Marcus Rodney, Mackba Rodney, Winston Rodney) — 3:49
5. "Brain Food" (W. Rodney) — 3:11
6. "Farther East of Jack" — 4:26
7. "2000 Years" (D. Hines, R. Willington, W. Rodney) — 3:49
8. "Dread River" (W. Rodney, M. Lawrence, P. Fullwood) — 3:13
9. "Workshop" (A. Folkes, W. Rodney, P. Fullwood) — 4:34
10. "Reggaelation" (W. Rodney) — 3:43

== Credits ==
- Winston Rodney - lead vocals
- Delroy Hines - harmony vocals
- Rupert Willington - harmony vocals
- Bobby Ellis - trumpet
- Vincent "Trommie" Gordon - trombone, clavinet
- Carlton "Sam" Samuels - flute
- Herman Marquis - alto saxophone
- Richard "Dirty Harry" Hall - tenor saxophone
- Tyrone "Organ D" Downie - piano, organ
- Bernard "Touter" Harvey - piano, organ, clavinet
- Earl "Chinna" Smith - lead guitar
- Valentine "Tony" Chin – rhythm guitar
- Robbie "Rabbi" Shakespeare - bass
- Aston "Family Man" Barrett - bass
- Leroy "Horsemouth" Wallace - drums

Production

- Engineers: George Philpott and Errol Thompson
- Dubbing engineers: John Burns and Dick Cuthell
- Recorded at Randy's Recording Studio, North Parade, Kingston, Jamaica
- Mixed at Joe Gibbs Studio, Retirement Crescent, Kingston, Jamaica
- Dub mix at Island Studios, Hammersmith
