= Farover =

Studio album by Burning Spear
- Released: 1982
- Recorded: 1982
- Genre: Reggae
- Length: 42:15
- Label: EMI
- Producer: Winston Rodney

Burning Spear chronology
Living Dub Vol. 2 (1980)	Farover (1982)	The Fittest of the Fittest (1983)

Farover is an album by the Jamaican reggae singer and musician Burning Spear, released in 1982.

== Critical reception ==
Professional ratings
Review scores
Source	Rating
AllMusic	4/5 stars
Robert Christgau	B+
The Encyclopedia of Popular Music	3/5 stars
The Rolling Stone Album Guide	3/5 stars

Robert Christgau noted that "ever more delicate backup horns subsume ever more docile backup vocals as his unearthly outcries grow more coaxing, less admonitory." The Boston Globe called Farover "a generally solid roots effort, even if it is not as intense as Burning Spear Live." The Miami Herald deemed the album "typical of him—mostly philosophical tunes like 'O'Jah' and the title song that are bouncy and soothing at best." Trouser Press praised the "haunting vocals and trance-inducing music."

== Track listing ==
All tracks are composed by Winston Rodney

1. "Farover" – 4:22
2. "Greetings" – 4:42
3. "Image (Of Marcus Mosiah Garvey)" – 4:53
4. "Rock" – 3:32
5. "Education" – 4:12
6. "She's Mine" – 4:48
7. "Message" – 5:26
8. "Oh Jah" – 5:33
9. "Jah Is My Driver" – 4:47

== Personnel ==
- Winston Rodney – lead vocals, background vocals, percussion
- Anthony Bradshaw – bass, percussion, background vocals (track 7)
- Aston "Family Man" Barrett – organ, clavinet, bass (track 9)
- Nelson Miller – drums, octoban
- Michael Wilson – lead and rhythm guitar
- Devon Bradshaw – rhythm guitar, lead guitar track 7
- Richard Johnson – organ, piano, synthesizer, clavinet
- Herman Marquis – alto saxophone
- Bobby Ellis – trumpet, percussion
- Elias Rodney – percussion

Credits

- Recorded and mixed at Tuff Gong Recording Studio, Kingston, Jamaica
- Engineer Errol Brown
- Mixed by Winston Rodney and Errol Brown
- Original cover by Neville Garrick
