= Reggae Greats =

Reggae Greats may refer to:

- Island Reggae Greats, a series of reggae compilation albums
- Reggae Greats (Burning Spear album), 1984
- Reggae Greats: Lee "Scratch" Perry
