= Marcus' Children =

Marcus' Children aka Social Living

Studio album by Burning Spear
- Released: 1978
- Recorded: 1978
- Genre: Reggae
- Length: 37:05
- Label: Island (ILPS 9556)
- Producer: Karl Pitterson, Winston Rodney

Burning Spear chronology
| Live (1977) | Marcus' Children aka Social Living (1978) | Living Dub Vol 1 (1979) |

Alternative cover
- Blood and Fire release

Marcus' Children is a studio album by the Jamaican musician Burning Spear, originally released in 1978 as Social Living. It was produced by Karl Pitterson and Burning Spear.

"Marcus Say Jah No Dead" was covered by Sinéad O'Connor on her 2005 album Throw Down Your Arms.

== Critical reception ==
Professional ratings
Review scores
| Source | Rating |
|---|---|
| AllMusic | 4/5 stars |
| Robert Christgau | A− |
| The Encyclopedia of Popular Music | 5/5 stars |

Robert Christgau wrote: "In its sinuous vocalizations and giving groove, its single and unison horns, the music is all charity and cooperation—it's why Winston Rodney is preaching 'Social living is the best.'"

== Track listing ==
=== Marcus' Children AKA Social Living ===
1. "Marcus Children Suffer" - 4:39
2. "Social Living"- 2:49
3. "Nyah Keith" - 4:03
4. "Institution" - 3:29
5. "Marcus Senior" - 5:09
6. "Civilized Reggae" - 7:11
7. "Mister Garvey" - 4:52
8. "Come"- 3:53
9. "Marcus Say Jah No Dead" - 3:57

=== Social Living (2003 Island Remaster) ===
1. "Marcus Children Suffer"
2. "Social Living"
3. "Nayah Keith"
4. "Institution"
5. "Marcus Senior"
6. "Civilized Reggae"
7. "Mister Garvey"
8. "Come"
9. "Marcus Say Jah No Dead"

==== Bonus Tracks ====
1. "Social Living [Extended Mix]"
2. "Civilized Reggae [Extended Mix]"

== Credits ==
- Recorded at Harry J Studio, Kingston, Jamaica and at Compass Point Studios, Nassau, Bahamas
- Engineer Sylvan Morris
- Mixed at Compass Point Studios by Karl Pitterson and Benji Armbrister
- All songs written by Winston Rodney and published by EMI Copyright Holdings Ltd. except tracks 2, 3, 5 published by Blue Mountain Music

== Musicians ==
- Earl "Chinna" Smith - guitar
- Bertram "Ranchie" McLean - guitar
- Brinsley Forde - guitar
- Donald "Roots" Kinsey - guitar
- Donald Griffiths - guitar
- Lowell "Sly" Dunbar - drums
- Leroy "Horsemouth" Wallace - drums
- Angus Gaye - drums
- Robbie Shakespeare - bass
- Aston "Family Man" Barrett - bass
- George Oban - bass
- Bernard "Touter" Harvey - keyboards
- Earl "Wire" Lindo - keyboards
- Michael "Ibo" Cooper - keyboards
- Courtney Hemmings - keyboards
- Bobby Ellis - trumpet
- Dick Cuthell - trumpet
- Richard "Dirty Harry" Hall - tenor saxophone
- Herman Marquis - alto saxophone
- Vincent "Trommie" Gordon - trombone
- Rico Rodriguez - trombone
- Winston Rodney - percussion
- Uziah "Sticky" Thompson - percussion

== Blood and Fire release notes ==
- Remastered by Kevin Metcalfe at the Town House, London
- Designed and built by Mat at intro, London
- Photograph of Cover by Phil Hale
- Photograph of the Black Disciple Band by Kim Gottlieb
- Photograph of Burning Spear by Adrian Boot
- The copyright to recording is owned by Island Records Inc. and is licensed to Blood and Fire Ltd.
