= Dry & Heavy (album) =

Studio album by Burning Spear
- Released: August 5, 1977
- Recorded: 1977
- Genre: Reggae
- Length: 32:04
- Label: Island
- Producer: Winston Rodney

Burning Spear chronology
Man in the Hills (1976)	Dry & Heavy (1977)	Live (1977)

Dry & Heavy is a studio album by the Jamaican musician Burning Spear, released in 1977 through Island Records.

== Production ==
The album was produced by Winston Rodney and recorded at Harry J's studio. It was the last album to include the musicians known as the Black Disciples.

== Critical reception ==
Professional ratings
Review scores
Source	Rating
AllMusic	4.5/5 stars
Christgau's Record Guide	B
The Encyclopedia of Popular Music	4/5 stars
The Rolling Stone Album Guide	4/5 stars

Fact deemed the album among Burning Spear's "peak-period greats." The Rolling Stone Album Guide wrote that Dry & Heavy "counterbalances the anger and dread of the early albums by displaying a downright optimistic side." PopMatters called it "an absolutely crucial album for Rodney, as it added a whole new arrow of nuance to his quiver—and it is also a really great-sounding reggae album."

== Track listing ==
All tracks composed by Winston Rodney; except where indicated

1. "Any River" - 3:19
2. "The Sun" (Rodney, Don Taylor, Phillip Fullwood) - 3:42
3. "It's a Long Way Around" (Rodney, Fullwood) - 3:06
4. "I W.I.N." - 3:47
5. "Throw Down Your Arms" - 4:05
6. "Dry & Heavy" - 3:29
7. "Wailing" - 2:46
8. "Black Disciples" - 4:23
9. "Shout It Out" - 3:27

== Personnel ==
- Winston Rodney - lead vocals, percussion, production, arrangements
- Robbie Shakespeare - bass guitar
- Aston "Family Man" Barrett - bass guitar
- Leroy "Horsemouth" Wallace - drums
- Bernard "Touter" Harvey - keyboards
- Earl "Wire" Lindo – keyboards
- Earl "Chinna" Smith - lead and rhythm guitar
- Donald "Roots" Kinsey - lead guitar
- Bertram "Ranchie" McLean - rhythm guitar
- Noel "Skully" Simms - percussion
- Uziah "Sticky" Thompson – percussion
- Bobby Ellis - trumpet
- Richard "Dirty Harry" Hall - tenor sax
- Herman Marquis - alto sax
- Vincent "Trommie" Gordon – trombone
- Sylvan Morris – engineer
