= Peter Sova =

Czech-born American cinematographer (1944–2020)

- Born: September 25, 1944; Prague, Protectorate of Bohemia and Moravia
- Died: August 27, 2020 (aged 75); South Kortright, New York, U.S.
- Years active: 1975–2019

Milan Peter Sova (September 25, 1944 – August 27, 2020) was a Czech-born American cinematographer.

== Early life ==
Sova was born in Prague, Protectorate of Bohemia and Moravia (present-day Czech Republic).

After training to be a machinist in Prague (then Czechoslovakia), he would emigrate to New York City, where he worked fixing cameras at ABC.

== Career ==
Sova's first work as cinematographer was on the 1977 film Short Eyes.

Through his career he would collaborate frequently with Barry Levinson and Paul McGuigan.

He became a member of the American Society of Cinematographers in 1999.

== Personal life and death ==
He was married to his wife Elizabeth from 1988 until her death in 2018. They had one son together.

Sova died at his home in South Kortright, New York on August 27, 2020, at the age of 75.

== Filmography ==
=== Film ===
Year	Title	Director
1977	Short Eyes	Robert M. Young
1978	Rockers	Theodoros Bafaloukos
1982	Diner	Barry Levinson
1987	Tin Men	Barry Levinson
1987	Good Morning, Vietnam	Barry Levinson
1987	Courtship	Howard Cummings
1989	Sing	Richard Baskin
1991	Late for Dinner	W. D. Richter
1991	Bed & Breakfast (Note: Shared credit with Peter Shea)	Robert Ellis Miller
1992	Straight Talk	Barnet Kellman
1994	Jimmy Hollywood	Barry Levinson
1995	Feast of July	Christopher Menaul
1996	Sgt. Bilko	Jonathan Lynn
1997	Donnie Brasco	Mike Newell
1998	The Proposition	Lesli Linka Glatter
2000	Gangster No. 1	Paul McGuigan
2002	Doctor Sleep	Nick Willing
2004	The Reckoning	Paul McGuigan
2004	Wicker Park	Paul McGuigan
2006	Lucky Number Slevin	Paul McGuigan
2008	The Strangers	Bryan Bertino
2009	Push	Paul McGuigan

=== Television ===
TV movies

Year	Title	Director	Notes
1975	The Jolly Corner	Arthur Barron	
1977	Soldier's Home	Robert Young	
1978	Summer of My German Soldier	Michael Tuchner	
1979	The Halloween That Almost Wasn't	Bruce Bilson	
1980	Barn Burning	Peter Werner	
1980	Nurse	David Lowell Rich	
1984	A Doctor's Story	Peter Levin	
1986	Adam's Apple	James Frawley	
1992	Double Jeopardy	Lawrence Schiller	With Robert Carmichael
1994	Fatherland	Christopher Menaul	

TV series

Year	Title	Director	Notes
1978	NBC Special Treat	Barra Grant	Episode "The Tap Dance Kid"
1986	The Equalizer	Donald Petrie	Episode "Dead Drop"

Miniseries

Year	Title	Director	Notes
2000	Perfect Murder, Perfect Town	Lawrence Schiller	
2006	Thief	Paul McGuigan	Episode "Pilot"

== Awards and nominations ==
Year	Award	Category	Title	Result
1994	CableACE Award	Cinematography in a Movie or Miniseries	Fatherland	Nominated
2000	AFI Fest	Vision Award in Cinematography	Gangster No. 1	Won
