= Peace and love =

Peace and love may refer to:

== Music ==
- Peace & Love (festival), a Swedish music festival

=== Albums ===
- Peace and Love (DJ Tatana album), 2004
- Peace and Love (Edison Chen album), 2001
- Peace & Love (Juliana Hatfield album), 2010
- Peace and Love (The Pogues album), 1989
- Peace and Love (Swingin' Utters album), 2018
- Peace and Love, Inc. (Information Society album), 1992

=== Songs ===
- "Peace and Love", by Fountains of Wayne from their album Welcome Interstate Managers
- "Peace & Love", by Juliana Hatfield from her album Peace & Love
- "Peace and Love", by Neil Young from his album Mirror Ball
- "Peace and Love", by Quasi from their album When the Going Gets Dark
- "Peace and Love", by the Red Hot Chili Peppers from their album Return of the Dream Canteen

== Other uses ==
- Peace and Love (sculpture), by Ringo Starr
- "Peace and Love" (Inspector George Gently), a 2010 television episode
- A common phrase used by Ringo Starr since at least 1992.

== See also ==
- Peace & Love City, a Swedish bandy club
- Love & Peace (disambiguation)
