= Slave Master =

Slave Master may refer to:

- "Slave Master", a song by Gregory Isaacs from the 1979 soundtrack Rockers
- "Slave Master", a song by Future from the 2015 album DS2
- "Slavemaster", an alias of serial killer John Edward Robinson (1943—)
