= Love & Peace =

Love & Peace is a catchphrase of pacifism, and may refer to several music-related topics:

== Albums ==
- Love & Peace (Edmond Leung EP), 2009
- Love & Peace (Elvin Jones-McCoy Tyner Quintet album), 1982
- Love & Peace (Emi Tawata album), 2008
- Love & Peace (Girls' Generation album), 2013
- Love & Peace (Ray Charles album), 1978
- Love & Peace (Seasick Steve album), 2020
- Love & Peace: Burning Spear Live!, an album by Burning Spear
- Love and Peace: A Tribute to Horace Silver, a 1995 album by Dee Dee Bridgewater

== Films ==
- Love & Peace (film), a 2015 Japanese film directed by Sion Sono

== Songs ==
- "Love & Peace", a song by Japanese band Tokio
- "Love & Peace", a 2006 song by Sifow from Clarity
- "Love & Peace! Hero ga Yattekita", the B-side to Morning Musume's single "The Manpower!!!"

== See also ==
- Peace and love (disambiguation)
