= Living Dub Vol. 2 =

Living Dub Volume 2

Studio album by Burning Spear
- Released: 1980
- Recorded: 1980
- Genre: Reggae
- Label: Burning Spear
- Producer: Winston Rodney

Burning Spear chronology
Hail H.I.M. (1980)	Living Dub Volume 2 (1980)	Farover (1982)

Alternative cover
- Burning Music release

Professional ratings
Review scores
Source	Rating
AllMusic	3/5 stars
The Encyclopedia of Popular Music	4/5 stars

Living Dub is a dub album by the Jamaican artist Burning Spear, his third overall and second under the name "Living Dub".

== Track listing ==
1. Cry Africa (Cry Blood Africans)
2. Telegram In Dub (African Postman)
3. Teacher (African Teacher)
4. Offensive Dub (Jah A Guh Raid)
5. Majestic Dub (Hail H.I.M.)
6. Pirate's Dub (Columbus)
7. Foggy (Road Foggy)
8. Marcus Dub (Follow Marcus Garvey)
9. World Dub (Bad To Worst)
10. Over All Dub (Civilized Reggae)

== Credits ==
- All songs written and arranged by Winston Rodney
- Published by Burning Music
- Recorded at Tuff Gong Recording Studio, Kingston Jamaica
- Engineered by Dennis Thompson and Errol Brown
- Remixed in November 1992 at Grove Recording Studio, Ocho Rios, Jamaica by Barry O'Hare and Nelson Miller
- Reissue supervision: Chris Wilson
- Original artwork and photography by Neville Garrick

== Personnel ==
- Winston Rodney - vocals, percussion, congos
- Aston "Family Man" Barrett - bass, percussion
- Nelson Miller - drums
- Junior Marvin - guitar
- Tyrone "Organ D" Downie - keyboards
- Earl "Wire" Lindo - keyboards
- Herman Marquis – alto saxophone
- Bobby Ellis - trumpet
- Egbert Evans - trombone
