= Hail H.I.M. =

Studio album by Burning Spear
- Released: 1980
- Recorded: 1980
- Genre: Reggae
- Length: 36:48
- Label: EMI
- Producers: Winston Rodney, Aston Barrett

Burning Spear chronology
Living Dub Vol. 1 (1979)	Hail H.I.M. (1980)	Living Dub Vol. 2 (1980)

Hail H.I.M. is a studio album by the Jamaican musician Burning Spear, released in 1980. He supported the album with a North American tour.

== Critical reception ==
Professional ratings
Review scores
Source	Rating
AllMusic	5/5 stars
Robert Christgau	B
The Encyclopedia of Popular Music	4/5 stars

Trouser Press considered "African Postman" and "Columbus" to be classics. The Black Country Evening Mail wrote that Burning Spear "is probably the only authentic rasta musician around who has not gone commercial."

== Track listing ==
1. "Hail H.I.M." (Winston Rodney)
2. "Columbus" (Rodney)
3. "Road Foggy" (Rodney)
4. "Follow Marcus Garvey" (Rodney)
5. "Jah See and Know" (Rodney)
6. "African Teacher" (Rodney)
7. "African Postman" (Rodney)
8. "Cry Blood Africans" (Rodney)
9. "Jah a Guh Raid" (Rodney)

== Musicians ==
- Winston Rodney - vocals, percussion, congos
- Aston "Family Man" Barrett - bass, percussion
- Nelson Miller - drums
- Junior Marvin - guitar
- Tyrone Downie - keyboards
- Earl Lindo - keyboards
- Bobby Ellis - trumpet
- Herman Marquis - saxophone
- Egbert Evans - horns

Credits

- Recorded and mixed at Tuff Gong Recording Studio, Kingston, Jamaica
- Engineers: Dennis Thompson and Errol Brown
- Original album cover design and photography by Neville Garrick
