= American Mime Theatre =

Mime theatre in New York City

American Mime Theatre, Inc.
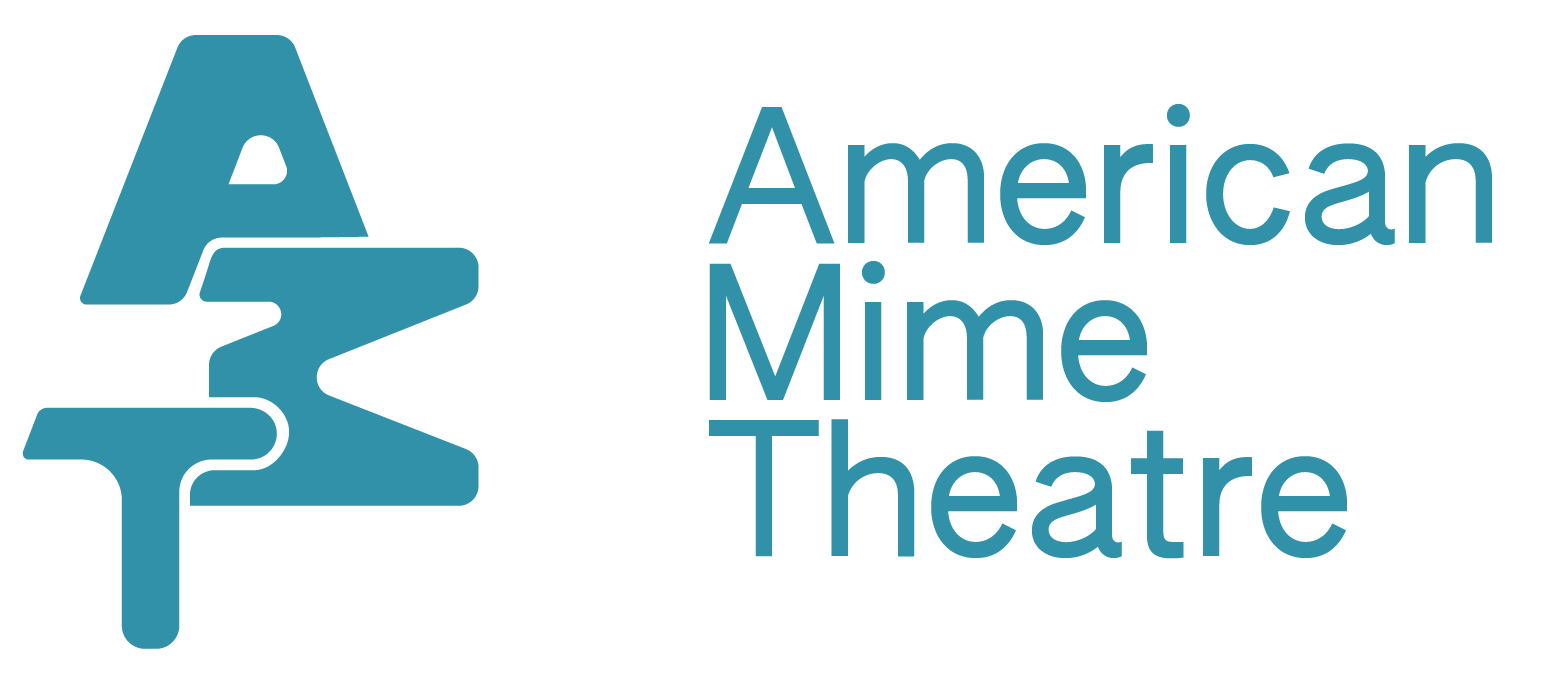
- American Mime Theatre's logo

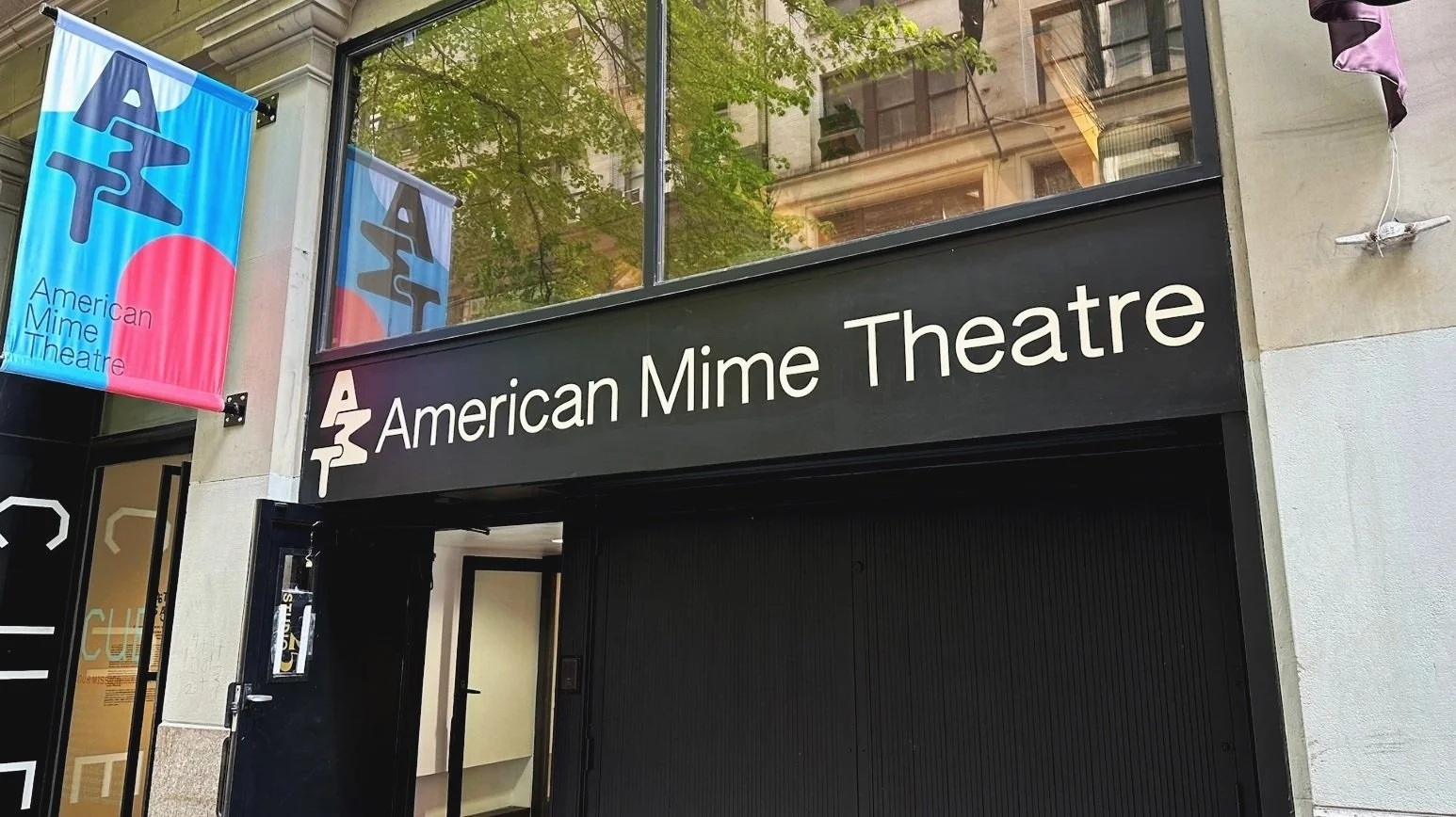
- The American Mime Theatre studio located in downtown NYC
- Industry: Performing Arts
- Founded: 1952
- Founder: Paul J. Curtis
- Headquarters: New York City
- Website: americanmimetheatre.org

The American Mime Theatre (AMT) is a New York not-for-profit arts corporation offering high-quality acting, movement, and physical theatre classes for adults and youth, as well as hosting its own professional performance company.It was founded in 1952 by Paul J. Curtis (August 29, 1927– April 28, 2012). Some of the notable performers in the company's past include Anita Morris, Lily Tomlin (albeit for exactly three weeks), James Noble and his wife Carolyn Coates, as well as Marion Knox, Deda Kavanaugh, Charles Barney, Janet Carafa, Marc Maislen, Daniel Richter, and Jean Barbour.

The organization’s mission is to preserve and evolve the art form known as American Mime, created by Paul J. Curtis in 1952. American Mime is a Medium for silent actors who play symbolic activities in characterization and express the feelings and desires of their characters honestly through a kind of motivated movement called “acting in form.”

In 2024, American Mime Theatre, Inc., appointed Janet Carafa, a longtime American Mime artist and yoga instructor, as the company’s new Artistic Director, with the goal of developing and evolving American Mime for new audiences, first in New York, and then nationally and internationally.

== Founder ==
Paul J. Curtis
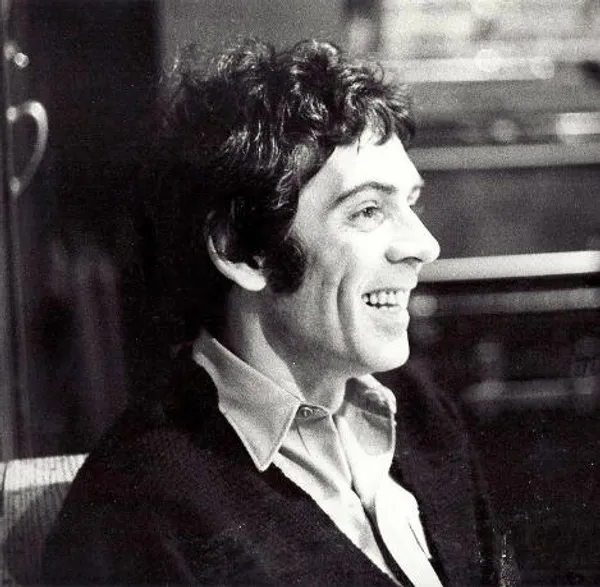
- Born: August 29, 1927
- Died: April 28, 2012 (aged 84)
- Education: Columbia University Dramatic Workshop of the New School for Social Research
- Organization(s): AEA, AFTRA, Nat. Movement Theater Assn.

Paul J. Curtis was born in Boston, MA on August 29, 1927. He studied at the Dramatic Workshop of the New School for Social Research in NYC, as well as Columbia University. Following his graduation, he moved to Europe, where he learned from German theatre director Erwin Piscator from 1947-1949.

Throughout his career, Curtis also served as a senior lecturer at Cornell University, the Chairman of the Mime Department at the American Academy of Dramatic Arts, and as a mime instructor with Bennington College. He was also associated with national and international institutions including International Mimes & Pantomimists, Jacob's Pillow Dance Festival, the Metropolitan Opera Ballet School, Gene Frankel Theater Workshop, the Guggenheim Museum, Johns Hopkins University, the American Conservatory Theatre, and the Leonardls.

== History ==
In 1952, 24-year-old Paul J. Curtis graduated as a theater director from the Dramatic Workshop of the New School for Social Research (NYC). He went to Europe to explore different theater forms and was disturbed by the arbitrary separation of acting and dance. Returning to the United States, he thought it would be interesting to present to American actors a project of mime to demonstrate its potential and to correct the limitations of the medium practiced by the French School of Mime.

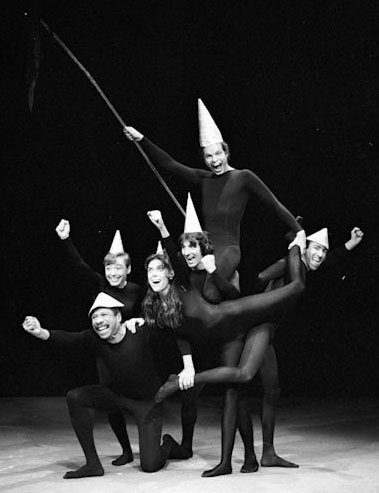
The American Mime company performs "Sludge"

Back in New York, Curtis formed a company of five actors and five dancers and began to create a series of new plays for a concert at the 92nd Street Y in New York City. With these performers, Curtis combined his extensive background in acting, dance, and movement arts to craft a new art form that went beyond traditional pantomime. On the suggestion of French theatre director, film and stage actor, Jean-Louis Barrault, Curtis decided to call his new style of performance “American Mime.”

For the next 70 years, the American Mime Theatre continued to evolve, with performances at legacy institutions including Lincoln Center, MoMA, and various international festivals.

Following Paul J. Curtis’s passing in 2012, AMT continued under the direction of lifelong AMT artist, Jean Barbour, who even held classes via Zoom during the COVID-19 quarantine period. Later, under the leadership of previous company member Arthur Yorinks, AMT expanded further, opening a new studio space in downtown NYC and producing repertoire and original productions.

As of 2024, Janet Carafa has taken over as AMT Artistic Director. Today, the company hosts an eight-member professional performance group, as well as a number of mime and physical theatre classes.

== Style and procedures ==
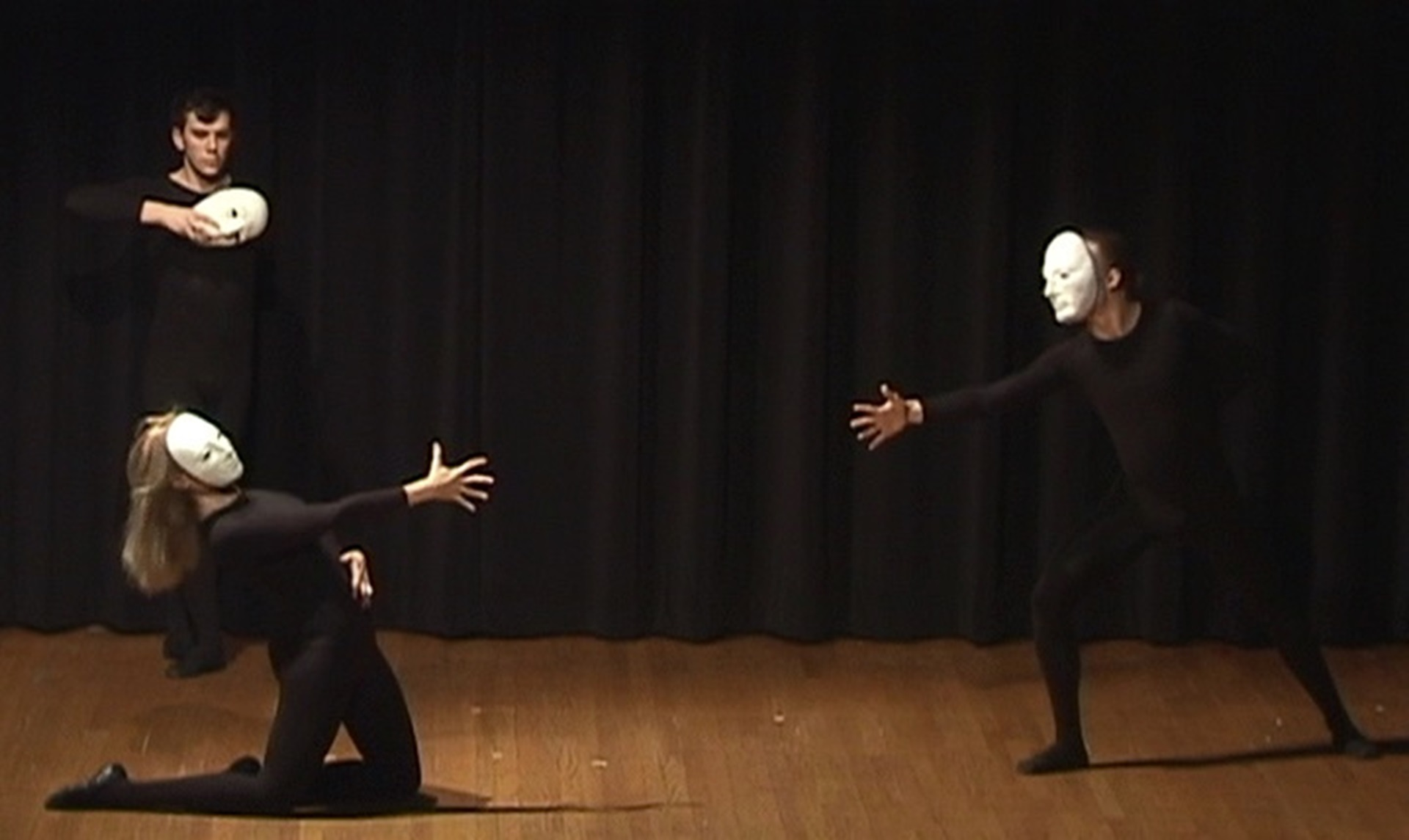
AMT presents The Lovers at Lincoln Center

The American Mime Theatre Study Process is documented in an extensive textbook written by AMT founder Paul J. Curtis. Through a series of classes, American Mime students learn a variety of procedures for developing physical technique and artistic skills in characterization and playwriting. Today, American Mime is taught through classes at AMT’s Studio and outside institutions. The purpose of the classes is not only to produce American Mime artists who may become teachers or members of the performing company, but also to teach the skills of American Mime to actors, dancers and other professional or beginning performers, teachers, and directors. Initial American Mime Core Classes include the following class procedures: preparation, moving to words, characterization, Interplay, technique, elements of movement, freedom, pantomime and improvisation. All class procedures are taught in the context of a unique methodology that requires each student to define their greatest lack, choose a device to improve that lack and to show the results in class.

The basic costume of the American Mime is a black, long-sleeve unitard and black dance shoes. While some additional costume elements may be added, full costumes are almost never used. Unlike other schools of mime, American Mime never uses whiteface, though some American Mime repertory performances, most notably “The Lovers” are performed using neutral masks.

== Repertoire ==
1950s
Title	Year	Director
The Pinball Machine	1953	Paul J. Curtis
Fate	1953	Paul J. Curtis
The Tell Tale Heart	1953	Paul J. Curtis
Escapade	1953	Paul J. Curtis
The Demon Lover	1953	Paul J. Curtis
Of Identity	1953	Paul J. Curtis
Once Upon An Island	1954	Paul J. Curtis
Monolotry	1954	Paul J. Curtis
The Triple Goddess	1954	Paul J. Curtis
The Western	1954	Paul J. Curtis
Improvisation	1955	Paul J. Curtis
Presentation	1955	Paul J. Curtis
Eden	1956	Paul J. Curtis
Abstraction	1956	Paul J. Curtis
Commedia	1956	Paul J. Curtis
Dreams I	1958	Paul J. Curtis

1960s
Title	Year	Director
The Scarecrow	1962	Paul J. Curtis
The Godstuff	1962	Paul J. Curtis
The Lovers	1963	Paul J. Curtis
Birds	1965	Paul J. Curtis
Female	1967	Paul J. Curtis
Light	1968	Paul J. Curtis
Hurly-Burly	1969	Paul J. Curtis

1970s
Title	Year	Director
Evolution	1973	Paul J. Curtis
Sludge	1974	Paul J. Curtis
Six	1975	Paul J. Curtis
Abstraction	1977	Paul J. Curtis

1980-90s
Title	Year	Director
The Unitaur	1982	Paul J. Curtis
Peepshow	1988	Paul J. Curtis
Pageant	1989	Paul J. Curtis
Music Box	1991	Paul J. Curtis

Present Day
Title	Year	Director
Dreams - 13 Variations	2024	Arthur Yorinks
Sol	2025	Janet Carafa
He Must Be Stopped	2025	Janet Carafa

== Reviews ==
In 1984, The New York Times wrote: "As one of the few who toiled in the vineyards over the decades when mime was considered chiefly a European import, Mr. Curtis deserves credit where credit is due. The program that the American Mime Theater is offering... demonstrated an independent view of mime that owes little to conventions associated with the form ... it allows for a free-form approach that roams between the realistic and the stylized."
