= Guy Portelli =

English sculptor (born 1957)

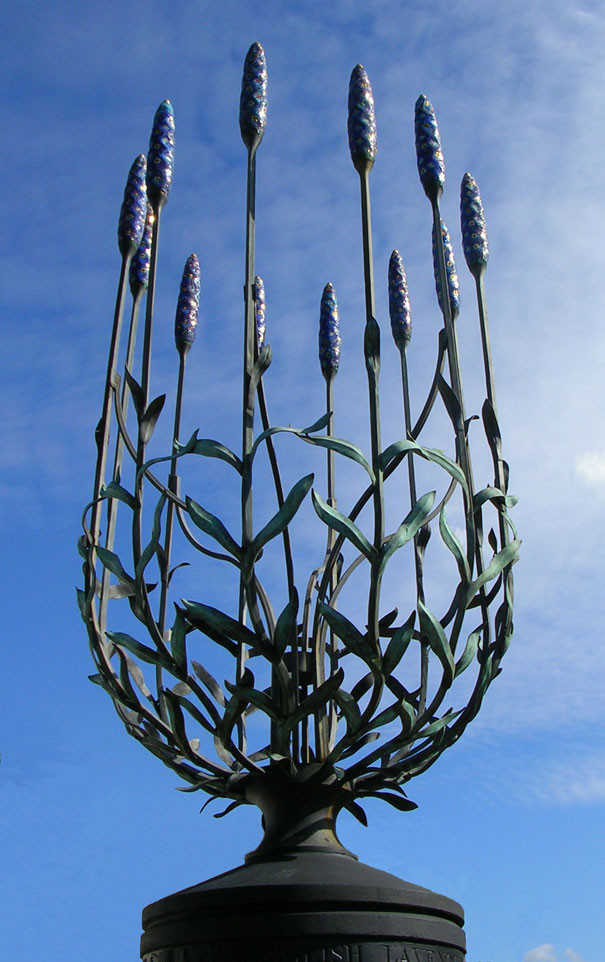
English Lavender in the London Borough of Sutton

Guy Portelli (born 13 June 1957) is a contemporary English sculptor and author.

== Life ==
He was born in South Africa in 1957, but moved permanently to England with his parents in 1969, who had each come earlier to Britain to study as art students. He lived largely with his grandfather in Southend, London, during the initial move. The family moved to Tonbridge in the early 1970s, where he still lives.

He studied at the Hugh Christie School in Tonbridge. He left school at 16 to study at Medway College of Art. Originally studying interior design, this changed to a focus on sculpture in his second year. Whilst at college he started his own business, designing theatre sets, employing around twenty people.

On graduation, he found work designing hotel interiors but continued a part-time course in sculpture at Chelsea Art College (where his parents had studied).

In the late 1970s, he found employment at the BBC's special-effects department, working on sets for Doctor Who and Blake's 7.

His father, of Maltese ancestry, had success as a musician and film-maker, and died in 1974, when Guy was only 17. Portelli’s own son Anthony died aged only 13.

== Sculpture ==
Portelli began sculpting at age 17.

His work is found in public and corporate collections in Britain and the United States. Musician Ringo Starr possesses several of his pieces. The Peace and Love sculpture has been on show in Beverly Hills.

Portelli was previously a fellow of the Royal Society of British Sculptors and was vice-president of the Royal Society of British Artists.

In 2002, he won the Elisabeth Frink School Award, and the Scott Goodman Harris Award in 2003.

== Dragons Den ==
In 2008, Portelli gained £80,000 from three investors of the television programme Dragons' Den, convincing them that modern art is a viable and realistic investment. This centred upon his "Pop Icons" collection, 18 pieces exhibited at the Mall Galleries in London. This instantly raised his public profile.

== Notable works ==
- Masai Warrior, Commonwealth Institute (1983)
- 13 Greek Goddesses, London Pavilion, Piccadilly Circus (1987)
- Opera Terrace fountain, Covent Garden, London (1987)
- Sculptures for the Townswomen’s Guild, Chelsea Flower Show (1990)
- 5m-high sculpture of Sir Rowland Hill, Shrewsbury (1991)
- Eagle Gates, Guernsey (1997)
- Multiple sculptures for the Trafford Centre, Manchester (1998)
- 6m English Lavender, Sainsbury’s, London Borough of Sutton (1999)
- Palio Horses, Sienna Building, Hatton Garden (1999)
- Sculpture of Group Captain Townsend, West Malling Airfield (2002)
- Mandela (mosaic, 2011)
- Spirit of 71, Swansea Museum (2011)
- The Torch, Tonbridge (2014)
- Celebrating the Battle of Hastings 950th Anniversary (sculpture, Battle High Street, 2016)
- Isle of Wight Festival - 50th Anniversary (mosaic and hand prints, Isle of Wight, 2020)

=== Pop Icons project (circa 2008) ===
As of May 2015, the pop icons series consisted of twenty three sculptures.

- Amy Winehouse - Excess (edition of five, 2008)
- Bob Marley
- Bob Dylan
- Bono
- David Bowie
- Elton John - Rocket Man (edition of five, 2009)
- Frank Sinatra
- Jimi Hendrix - Hey Joe
- Jeff Beck
- John Lennon
- John Lee Hooker
- Led Zeppelin - Meridian
- Grace Jones - Grace Jones (edition of ten, 1985)
- Madonna - The Material Girl
- Melanie Safka
- Michael Jackson
- Miles Davis
- Prince - Purple Crash
- Sade
- Sex Pistols - Post Punk
- Spice Girls - What U Want (edition of five, 2009)
- Tupac
- The Who - Mod Rock (edition of five, 2009)

== Books ==
- Modern British Sculpture, Guy Portelli, 2005

== See also ==
- List of British artists
- List of sculptors
