= Barn Burning (film) =

- Directed by: Peter Werner
- Written by: Horton Foote
- Story by: William Faulkner
- Produced by: Robert Geller; Calvin Skaggs
- Starring: Henry Fonda; Tommy Lee Jones
- Cinematography: Peter Sova
- Edited by: Jay Freund
- Music by: Elizabeth Swados
- Production company: Learning in Focus
- Release date: March 18, 1980
- Running time: 41 minutes
- Country: United States
- Language: English

Barn Burning is a 1980 American short film directed by Peter Werner and starring Tommy Lee Jones. It is based on the 1939 short story of the same name by William Faulkner.

== Cast ==
- Tommy Lee Jones as Abner Snopes
- Diane Kagan as Mother Snopes
- Carolyn Coates as Lula De Spain
- Michael Riney as Brother
- Shawn Whittington as Sarty Snopes
- Jimmy Faulkner as Major De Spain
- Jennie Hughes
- Julie Kaye Townery
- Al Scott
- Jean Pettigrew
- Henry Fonda as narrator
