= Carolyn Coates =

American actress (1927–2005)

- Born: Carolyn Owen Oates; April 29, 1927; Oklahoma City, Oklahoma, U.S.
- Died: March 27, 2005 (aged 77); Branford, Connecticut, U.S.
- Education: UCLA
- Occupation: Actress
- Years active: 1947–2001
- Spouse: James Noble (m. 1955)
- Children: 1

Carolyn Owen Coates (April 29, 1927 – March 27, 2005) (Note: As per the gravestone photo featured on her Find a Grave page, the middle name Coates was given by her parents was Owen, her mother's maiden name.) was an American stage, film and television actress. Noted for portraying formidable women, Coates earned a Theatre World Award for her performance as Hecuba in The Trojan Women.

== Early life and career ==
A native of Oklahoma City, Coates was the younger of two daughters born to Jessica Owen and Glenn Clinton Coates. Her parents soon divorced, however, and, as noted in a 1973 interview, subsequent remarriages led to a decidedly unsettled pre-adolescence. As Coates recalled, "I was in 10 different schools before 10th grade." The resulting anxiety made her all the more appreciative upon discovering that "[t]he theater is like a family, like a home—all of the things I missed as a child."

After finally settling in Santa Monica, Coates studied acting at UCLA. There, she gained valuable experience, in roles such as Shakespeare's Juliet, Margaret in Thomas Dekker's The Shoemaker's Holiday (starring opposite a young William Schallert), and Cybel in Eugene O'Neill's The Great God Brown. During this period, Coates also appeared in summer stock with the Bolton Landing Players, earning kudos as Millie in Frederick Jackson's The Bishop Misbehaves, and as Aunt Connie in Mark Reed's Yes, My Darling Daughter.

In 1954, Coates appeared as Agatha in the American premiere of Jean Giraudoux's Electra, staged at the Henry Street Playhouse in New York's Greenwich Village. The following year, she and erstwhile Pygmalion co-star James Noble were wed. Shortly thereafter, and continuing for roughly six years, they became featured performers in Paul J. Curtis's American Mime Theatre.

In 1965, her portrayal of Hecuba in Euripides' The Trojan Women earned Coates a Theatre World Award. In December of that year she was narrated "Sibelius: A Symphony for Finland," a 90-minute TV documentary commemorating the composer's centennial, which aired on NET's series Festival of the Arts.

In May 1967, Coates co-starred with Martin Sheen, Eugene Roche, Frederick Rolf and Eleanor Phelps on The Catholic Hour, in a series of four episodes addressing the question, "Is God dead?"

In 1985, Coates undertook what would later be termed, variously, a nine-year sabbatical or retirement, to volunteer in hospitals and on the phones for AIDS Project Los Angeles and the Gay Men's Health Crisis.

In 2001, New Haven's Long Wharf Theater hosted what would prove to be the actress's swan song, as Coates portrayed Gladys in Kenneth Lonergan's The Waverly Gallery. Hartford Courant critic Malcolm Johnson writes:

This portrait of the mental disintegration of 85-year-old Gladys Green, acted by the tiny Carolyn Coates with shifts from lucidity and humor to crazy jumbles of words, will break the heart of anyone who has ever suffered through the decline of an aged parent or relative. [...] Coates' sometimes playful, sometimes dithering, occasionally volatile performance, sweet, charged with nostalgia and a confusion complicated by deafness, dominates Tillinger's production.

== Personal life ==
Having first met her future husband in 1951, playing Eliza Doolittle to his Henry Higgins in a summer stock production of Pygmalion in Worcester, Massachusetts, Coates married actor James Noble in 1955. They had one child, a daughter.

On March 27, 2005, Coates died of cancer at the Connecticut Hospice in Branford, Connecticut, survived by her husband and daughter. Her remains are interred at the family plot in Muskogee, Oklahoma, alongside those of her husband.

== TV appearances ==
TV
TV Show	Role	Episode	Year
Camera Three	NA (Note: On location at Circle in the Square Downtown, performing a scene from Jean Genet's The Balcony; episode also features producer Theodore Mann and director Jose Quintero.)		1961
The Inheritance	NA (Voice only)		1965
Jean Sibelius	Narrator		1965
New York Television Theatre	Elmina Ruggles	"The Club Bedroom"	1966
The Catholic Hour	Young Woman	"A Sense of Loss"	1967
The Catholic Hour	Young Woman	"An Abundance of Perspectives"	1967
The Catholic Hour	Young Woman	"A Father's Death"	1967
The Catholic Hour	Woman B	"Rebirths of Hope"	1967
Critique	Herself (reading translations of Russian poetry)	"Poets on Street Corners"	1969
Guideline	Margaret ("a 35-year-old mother of three who refuses to bear a fourth child"; her abortion "causes estrangement among members of her family.")	"Whose Life"	1970
The Doctors	Alice Watson		1975
Dallas	Nurse	"Mastectomy: Part 1"	1979
Knots Landing	Karen's Mother	"Will the Circle Be Unbroken"	1980
Lou Grant	Margaret Carruthers	"Search"	1981
The Waltons	Elvira Perkins	"The Gold Watch"	1981
Palmerstown, U.S.A.		"Roadhouse"	1981
Jessica Novac	NA	"Kenny"	1981
McClain's Law	Margaret Stanton	"The Sign of the Beast: Part 1"	1982
Benson	Mrs. Collingswood	"The Honeymooners"	1983
Benson	Judge Watson	Made in Hong Kong: Part 1	1984
Remington Steele	Mayor Amaryllis MacKenzie	"Small Town Steele"	1984
Glitter	Mrs. Davis	"A Minor Miracle"	1984
St. Elsewhere	Mrs. Fordham	"Saving Face"	1985
St. Elsewhere	Mrs. Fordham	"Amazing Face"	1985
St. Elsewhere	Mrs. Fordham	"She Rote"	1985

== Filmography ==
Film
Year	Title	Role	Notes
1961	The Hustler	Waitress	
1972	The Effect of Gamma Rays on Man-in-the-Moon Marigolds	Mrs. McKay	
1980	Barn Burning	Aunt	
1980	Joshua's World	NA	
1980	Scared Straight! Another Story	Mary Loring	
1981	The Postman Always Rings Twice	Twin Oaks Customer	
1981	Murder in Texas	Helen Fairchild	
1981	Mommie Dearest	Mother Superior	
1981	Incident at Crestridge	Mrs. Dobbs	
1983	Starflight: The Plane That Couldn't Land	Claire	
1983	Blood Feud	Kennedy's secretary	
1984	The Buddy System	Teacher	
1985	This Child Is Mine	Grace	

== Playlist ==
Plays
Year	Play	Role	Theater	Notes
1947	The Great God Brown	Cybel	UCLA Campus Theatre	April 22, 1947 - April 26, 1947
1954	Electra	Agatha	Henry Street Playhouse	April 19, 1954 - April 25, 1954
1963	The Trojan Women	Trojan Woman	Circle in the Square Downtown	December 23, 1963 - ?
1965	And Things That Go Bump in the Night	Ruby (Standby)	Royale Theatre	April 26, 1965 – May 8, 1965
1965	Who's Afraid of Virginia Woolf?	Martha (with James Noble as George)	Williamstown Theatre Festival	July 13, 1965 – July 17, 1965
1965	Three Sisters	Olga	Williamstown Theatre Festival	July 27, 1965 – July 31, 1965
1965	The Trojan Women	Hecuba	Circle in the Square Downtown	September 3, 1965 – ?
1965	The Country Wife	Miss Althea	Vivian Beaumont Theatre	December 9, 1965 – January 23, 1966
1966	The Condemned of Altona	Johanna	Vivian Beaumont Theatre	February 3, 1966 – March 13, 1966
1966	The Caucasian Chalk Circle	NA	Vivian Beaumont Theatre	March 24, 1966 – June 18, 1966
1966	A Whitman Portrait	The Woman	Gramercy Arts Theatre	October 11, 1966 – ?
1967	The Party on Greenwich Avenue	Helen Radmacher	Cherry Lane Theatre	May 10, 1967 – ?
1968	The Death of Bessie Smith / The American Dream	Second Nurse / Mrs. Barker	Billy Rose Theatre	October 2, 1968 – October 26, 1968
1969	Fire!	Lorna	Longacre Theatre	January 28, 1969 - February 1, 1969
1969	A Scent of Flowers	Agnes	Martinique Theatre	October 20, 1969 – ?
1970	The Disintegration of James M. Cherry	Woman	Mitzi E. Newhouse Theatre	January 29, 1970 – ?
1970	The Effect of Gamma Rays on Man-in-the-Moon Marigolds	Beatrice	Mercer Arts Center	April 7, 1970 – ?
1971	All Over	The Wife, The Nurse (Standby)	Martin Beck Theatre	March 28, 1971 – May 1, 1971
