= Free Man =

Studio album by Burning Spear
- Released: July 1, 2003
- Recorded: 2003
- Genre: Reggae
- Label: Burning Spear
- Producer: Burning Music Production

Burning Spear chronology
Calling Rastafari (1999)	Free Man (2003)	Living Dub Vol. 6 (2004)

Free Man is a studio album by Jamaican reggae singer Burning Spear, released in 2003.

It was nominated for a Grammy Award for Best Reggae Album at the 46th Grammy Awards in 2004.

== Track listing ==
1. "Trust"
2. "We Feel It"
3. "Ha Ha"
4. "Not Guilty"
5. "Rock and Roll"
6. "Hey Dready"
7. "Freeman"
8. "Loved For Who I Am"
9. "Rise Up"
10. "Old School"
11. "They Can't"
12. "Changes"

== Credits ==
- All songs written by Winston Rodney
- Published by Burning Spear Publishing
- Recorded, Mixed, Edited and Mastered by Chris Daley at MVP (The New Harry J) Studio, 10 Roosevelt Ave., Kingston, Jamaica, WI

"Old School" and "They Can't" Recorded by Stephen Stewart

- Assistant Engineer: Khabier Bonner
- Remastered by George Marino at Sterling Sound NY, NY
- Photography: Mark Seliger
- Design: Helicopter
- Listening Panel: Elise Kelly, Basil Walters, Roland Reid, Sonia Rodney, T. Boots Harris, Stephen Stewart
- Special Thanks to all the musicians who worked on this project, engineer, assistant engineer and listening panel, all the fans all over the world, Mrs. Sonia Rodney, Marl Seliger, Brother Asher, Michael Sauvage and Roger Steffen, Garrett Vandermollen.

== Musicians ==
Burning Spear - lead vocals, percussion, background vocals

- Leroy "Horsemouth" Wallace - drums
- Shawn "Mark" Dawson - drums
- Dillon White - drums
- Chris Meredith - bass
- Ian "Beezy" Coleman - bass, rhythm guitar, lead guitar
- Stephen Stewart - keyboards
- Leebert "Gibby" Morrison - lead guitar
- Robert Browne - lead guitar
- Uziah "Sticky" Thompson - percussion
- Christopher "Skyjuice" Burth - percussion
- Chico Chin - trumpet
- Everton Gayle - saxophone
- Barry Bailey - trombone
- Delton Browne - background vocals
- Paul "Lymie" Murray - background vocals
- Pam Hall - background vocals
- Michael "Lukie D" Kennedy - background vocals
- Anthony Selassie - background vocals
- Jeoffrey "Star" Forrest - background vocals
