= Paramedics (film) =

1988 film by Stuart Margolin

- Directed by: Stuart Margolin
- Written by: Barry Bardo; Richard Kriegsman
- Produced by: Leslie Greif
- Starring: George Newbern; Christopher McDonald
- Cinematography: Michael W. Watkins
- Edited by: Allan A. Moore
- Music by: Murray MacLeod
- Distributed by: Vestron Pictures
- Release date: June 3, 1988
- Running time: 90 min
- Country: United States
- Language: English
- Box office: $149,577

Paramedics is a 1988 comedy film starring George Newbern and Christopher McDonald.

== Plot ==
When this group of rowdy and raunchy, laid-back medics are transferred from their cushy uptown district to the rough south-end, they find plenty of trouble when they discover the tough guys are playing a "corpses-for-dollars" scam and they want to crack the case. Mike "Mad Mike" and "Uptown", having been sent to the new district by their boss, Captain Prescott, as a form of punishment, soon discover that two paramedics are working with gang members in order to provide dead bodies, which would be harvested for organs to be sold on the Black Market. So they decide to bring down the black market and their old boss, who has nothing to do with the black market, but has ended up their boss again in the South District. All of this Uptown is dealing with his girlfriend, Savannah, who wants him to focus and go to med school, and Mad Mike, who is smitten with a French woman (Liette), who is transporting a heart from France that is needed for a transplant.

There is a subplot about a mystery woman named "Danger Girl" who seduces her lovers to the point they meet with bizarre accidents, as was the case of the judge who had a near fatal heart attack and a man who drove his car into a water fountain. At the end of the film, she meets up with Captain Prescott, who much to his chagrin, has been named Deputy Chief of the South District, on the recommendation of heroes Uptown and Mad Mike, who receive special recognition for breaking up the black market scheme.

== Cast ==
- George Newbern as "Uptown"
- Christopher McDonald as Mike "Mad Mike"
- John P. Ryan as Captain Prescott
- James Noble as Chief Wilkins
- John Pleshette as Dr. Lido
- Elaine Wilkes as Savannah
- Lydie Denier as Liette
- Lawrence Hilton-Jacobs as "Blade Runner"
- Karen Witter as "Danger Girl"
- Ray Walston as Heart Attack Patient
- Leigh Hamilton as Despatcher (Note: Though Leigh Hamilton played the role of the Despatcher, her voice was overdubbed by Sally Kellerman.)
- Peter Isackson as Breedlove
- Eric Boardman as White
- Lisa Applewhite as Nurse Helms
- Helanie Lembeck as Lieutenant Holcomb
- Bill Johnson as Caesar "Big Caesar"

== Release ==
The film was given a limited release in the United States by Vestron Pictures on June 3, 1988. Opening on 301 screens, the film's opening weekend gross was $149,577. Vestron would stop tracking the film after its first weekend.

== DVD release ==
Lions Gate Home Entertainment has not announced any current plans to release the film onto DVD.
