= Rockers (1978 film) =

- Directed by: Theodoros Bafaloukos
- Written by: Theodoros Bafaloukos
- Produced by: Patrick Hulsey
- Starring: Leroy "Horsemouth" Wallace
- Cinematography: Peter Sova
- Edited by: Susan Steinberg
- Production company: Rockers Film Corporation
- Distributed by: New Yorker Films; Succéfilm
- Release date: 1978
- Running time: 100 minutes
- Country: Jamaica
- Languages: English; Jamaican Patois
- Budget: JA$500,000

Rockers is a 1978 Jamaican comedy-drama film by Theodoros Bafaloukos. Several popular reggae artists star in the movie, including Leroy "Horsemouth" Wallace, Burning Spear, Gregory Isaacs, Big Youth, Dillinger, Robbie Shakespeare, and Jacob Miller.

Rockers was originally intended to be a documentary but blossomed into a full-length feature showing reggae culture at its peak. The film features authentic culture, characters and mannerisms. The main rocker Leroy "Horsemouth" Wallace, for example, is shown living with his actual wife and children and in his own home.

The recording studios shown are the famous Harry J Studios and Channel One Studios, where many roots reggae artists recorded during the 1970s including Bob Marley. The film includes Kiddus I's recording of "Graduation In Zion" at Harry J's, which he happened to be recording when Bafaloukos visited the studio, and a scene where Robbie arranges a session for the protagonist at Channel One. It also features Randy's Record Mart, the largest Jamaican music store of its time, and Joe Gibbs Record Manufacturing Co.

With a budget of JA$500,000 (about $40,000), Rockers was completed in two months. The film premiered at the 1978 San Francisco Film Festival and had a theatrical release in the US in 1980.

== Plot ==
Horsemouth, a drummer living in a ghetto of Kingston, Jamaica, plans to make some extra money selling and distributing contemporary reggae records. He buys an orange-red 175 motorcycle on borrowed money to carry them to the sound systems, bodegas, clubs, and even (dance) parties around the island. His friend Jah Wise paints a Lion of Judah on both sides of the gas tank. Then Horsemouth gets the records to distribute from Jack Ruby and Joe Gibbs record businesses. After selling some records at various places, Horsemouth pays a visit to singer Jacob Miller at Channel One Studios, and he is asked to play drums with Miller and members of the band Inner Circle for a gig in a tourist resort. When Horsemouth goes to the resort to sign for the job, he gets acquainted with the owner's daughter, Sunshine.

That night, Horsemouth's motorbike is stolen. During the following days, Sunshine discovers that the robbers are her father's hired men, who run an organized crime scheme led by Sunshine's father. After some hesitation, she ends up helping Horsemouth and his friends recover the bike and other stolen goods. The film starts as a loose interpretation of Vittorio de Sica's 1948 film Bicycle Thieves and turns into a reggae interpretation of the Robin Hood myth.

== Cast ==
- Leroy "Horsemouth" Wallace as himself (drummer)
- Monica "Madgie" Craig as herself (Horsemouth's common-law wife in real life)
- Poopa, Sharon, and Rickie as themselves (children of Horsemouth and Madgie in real life)
- Richard "Dirty Harry" Hall as himself (saxophonist)
- Gregory "Jah Tooth" Isaacs as himself (singer)
- Jacob "Jakes" Miller as himself (singer)
- Robert "Robbie" Shakespeare as himself (bassist)
- Frank Dowding as Kiddus I (himself) (singer)
- Winston Rodney as Burning Spear (himself) (singer)
- Manley Buchanan as Big Youth (himself) (deejay)
- Lester Bullocks as Dillinger (himself) (deejay)
- Berris "Prince Hammer" Simpson as himself (deejay and producer)
- Winston "Dr. Alimantado" Thompson as himself (deejay)
- Joseph "Big Joe" Spalding as himself (deejay)
- Everard "Jah Ruby" Metcalf as himself (deejay and member of the dance group Black Invaders)
- Fay Bennett as herself (early slackness deejay and comedian)
- Martin Williams as Mr. Marshall (rocksteady singer from the Jamaicans)
- Marjorie "Sunshine" Norman as Mr. Marshall's daughter (occasional actress, lived in the same community as Ashley "Higher" Harris in real life).
- Lawrence "Jack Ruby" Lindo as himself (record producer)
- Sister Aloma as herself (wife of L. "Jack Ruby" Lindo, managed Jack Ruby's record store in Ocho Ríos)
- Joe Gibbs as himself (record producer)
- Philyp "John Dread" Richards as himself (music promoter and future music producer)
- Errol "Knatty Garfield" Brown as himself (Rastafari personality, also appears in the concert documentary film Heartland Reggae; not to be confused with other artists named Errol Brown)
- Syndrel "T. Dread" Easington as himself (reggae personality and friend of artists)
- Junior "Natty Majesty" Wilby as himself (young Rastafarian and friend of artists)
- Omar "Ruffy" & Otis "Tuffy" Newton as themselves (twin Rastafari children known among reggae artists)
- Sylvan Morris as himself (sound engineer)
- Tommy McCook as himself (saxophonist, flautist)
- Herman Marquis as himself (saxophonist)
- Bobby Ellis as himself (trumpeter)
- Vin Gordon as himself (trombonist)
- Earl "Chinna" Smith as himself (guitarist)
- Bertram "Ranchie" McLean as himself (guitarist, bassist and composer)
- Leroy Smart as himself (singer)
- Noel "Scully" Simms as himself (percussionist)
- Uziah "Sticky" Thompson as himself (percussionist)
- Herman "Bongo Herman" Davis as himself (percussionist and dancer with a unique style in a scene at a record shop)
- Ian Lewis as himself (bassist and founding member of Inner Circle)
- Roger Lewis as himself (guitarist and founding member alongside his brother Ian of Inner Circle)
- Bernard "Touter" Harvey (keyboardist and composer)
- Earl "Wya" Lindo as himself (keyboardist)
- Belly Lloyd as himself (pianist)
- Carlton "Santa" Davis as himself (drummer)
- Trevor "Leggo Beast" Douglas as himself (music promoter)
- Tyrone "Trainer Ragg" Blake as himself (owner of Turntable Club and Merritone Sound System)
- Don Cooper as himself (selector at Merritone Turntable Club)
- Robert "Jah Wise" Campbell as himself (painter, visual artist and selector for Tippatone Sound System)
- Theophilus "Easy Snapping" Beckford as himself (pianist and ska pioneer)
- The Mighty Diamonds as themselves (vocal reggae group).
- The Abyssinians as themselves (vocal reggae group)
- Ras Michael & the Sons of Negus as themselves (traditional Rastafarians drummers; Ras Michael as vocalist)
- Black Invaders as themselves (popular dance group from Jamaica)
- Ashley "Higher" Harris as himself (Rastafarian bush doctor living in the mountains)
- Raymond "Jeep Man" Hall as himself (ganja planter)
- Peter Francis Honiball as Mr Honeyball (himself) (businessman and manager of the gourmet restaurant "Au Refuge" in real life. Part of the film was shot at Honiball's home, called Hightide at Rosemount in the Parish of St James.)
- Robert F. Colesberry as a tourist (U.S. producer and actor)
- Sandy McLeod as a tourist (U.S. filmmaker and actress).

== Critical reception ==
Janet Maslin of The New York Times highlighted the film's "funny, offbeat players and sinuous reggae score." Q Classic wrote: "What makes Rockers so splendid is both that it is entirely natural – the Rasta speak verges on impenetrable and subtitles are essential for most – and its stellar cast. Despite depicting a grittily real Jamaica, Rockers is in essence similar to a mid-'60s pop B-movie: a feeble plot bolstered by some pop stars trying to act, between singing a few songs." Jamaican novelist Marlon James, writing for GQ magazine, opined: "Don't bother watching for the plot ... you watch Rockers for the dazzling feats of Jamaica's fashion imagination: sweater-vests, tracksuits, sweater-vests with tracksuits, suits tailored for a wedding but put to better use at a party... The fashion bull's-eyes fill every frame".

On the review aggregator website Rotten Tomatoes, 100% of 6 critics' reviews are positive.

== Soundtrack ==
The soundtrack to the film was released in 1979 by Mango Records and includes only some of the songs heard in the film. In 2024, Rolling Stone magazine named it the 52nd greatest soundtrack of all time.

== Legacy ==
Samples of the film's dialogue were used in the early 1990s jungle track "Babylon" by Splash, "Terrorist Dub" by Californian ragga metal band Insolence, in the track "Zion Youth" from the 1995 album Second Light by Dreadzone and in 2012 in the song "Smoke" by Inner Terrestrials.

In 2018, Wallace, Kiddus I, and Big Youth came together to perform two shows in São Paulo, Brazil, to commemorate the 40th anniversary of the film.

In 2019, Italian singer Alborosie released "Living Dread", a cover of Black Uhuru's "Anthem". The music video recreates scenes from the film Rockers and features Leroy 'Horsemouth' Wallace, the film's original star.

== See also ==
- The Harder They Come (1972)
