= Jack Ruby (music producer) =

Jamaican record producer and sound system operator (1943–1989)

- Born: Lawrence Lindo; 14 March 1943
- Died: 7 April 1989 (aged 46)
- Years active: 1970s-1989
- Relatives: Jack Ruby Jr. (son); Kisean Paul Anderson (grandson)

Lawrence Lindo (14 March 1943 – 7 April 1989), better known as Jack Ruby, was a Jamaican record producer and sound system operator, best known for his 1970s productions of artists such as Burning Spear.

Ruby was based in Ocho Rios and during his time was the only major Jamaican record producer not headquartered in Kingston. He ran the Jack Ruby Hi Fi sound system and is considered one of the best roots reggae producers of the 1970s, having established a distinctive sound, noted for the unique use of horn arrangements. Ruby produced Burning Spear's Marcus Garvey and Man in the Hills albums, both of which were licensed to Island Records, establishing Spear as an international success. Other artists that he produced include Justin Hinds (Just in Time/Jezebel), the Gaylads, the Heptones, and Big Youth.

Ruby appeared as himself in the film Rockers, which also features Kiddus I recording "Graduation in Zion" in Ruby's studio.

In the 1980s, he suffered from ill-health and his productions were less regular, although he produced the debut album by Foundation in 1988. He died in April 1989.

His son, who works under the name Jack Ruby Jr., is a deejay who has worked with the Toasters, and his grandson is the popular singer Sean Kingston.

== Productions ==
- Burning Spear – Marcus Garvey (1976)
- Burning Spear – Garvey's Ghost (1976)
- Burning Spear – Harder Than The Best (compilation of recordings from 1975–1977)
- Burning Spear – Man in the Hills (1976)
- Justin Hinds & the Dominoes – Jezebel (1976)
- Justin Hinds – Just in Time (1978)
- Kiddus I – Graduation in Zion (compilation 1978–1980) - produced some tracks
- Ken Boothe & Tyrone Taylor – Two of a Kind (1987)
- Various Artists – Black Slavery Days (The Sound of St. Ann's) (recorded 1975, released 1981)
- Various Artists – Jack Ruby Hi Fi (1981)
- Various Artists – Jack Ruby Presents the Black Foundation (compilation of 1970s recordings)
- King Tubby & Errol Thompson – The Black Foundation in Dub (dubs of the above album)
- Donovan – World Power (1987)
- Donovan – Banzani (1988)
- Foundation – Flames (1987)
- Foundation – Heart Feel It (1988)
- Earth Messengers – Ivory Towers (1988)
- Link and Chain – New Day (1988)
- Revealers – hard times 70's
