= Calling Rastafari =

Studio album by Burning Spear
- Released: August 24, 1999
- Recorded: 1999
- Studios: Grove Music Studio (Ocho Rios, Jamaica)
- Genre: Roots reggae
- Length: 54:24
- Label: Heartbeat Records
- Producers: Sonia Rodney (exec.); Burning Spear

Burning Spear chronology
Living Dub Vol. 4 (1999)	Calling Rastafari (1999)	Free Man (2003)

Alternative cover

Professional ratings
Review scores
Source	Rating
AllMusic	4/5 stars
Exclaim!	N/A

Calling Rastafari is a studio album by Jamaican reggae singer Burning Spear. It was released on August 24, 1999 through Heartbeat Records. Recording sessions took place at Grove Music Studio in Ocho Rios.

The album peaked at number 9 on the Reggae Albums chart in the United States. It won the Grammy Award for Best Reggae Album at the 42nd Annual Grammy Awards in 2000.

== Track listing ==
All tracks are written by Burning Spear.

No.	Title	Length
1.	"As It Is"	4:56
2.	"Hallelujah" (Extended Mix)	6:51
3.	"House of Reggae"	4:37
4.	"Let's Move"	4:36
5.	"Brighten My Vision"	4:47
6.	"You Want Me To"	4:57
7.	"Calling Rastafari"	3:51
8.	"Sons of He" (Extended Mix)	5:59
9.	"Statue of Liberty"	3:36
10.	"Own Security"	4:27
11.	"Holy Man" (Extended Mix)	5:47
Total length:		54:24

== Personnel ==
Burning Band

- Winston Rodney – vocals, percussion, arranger, producer, mixing
- Stephen Stewart – keyboards
- Num Heru-ur Shutef Amon'Tehu – percussion
- Clyde Cummings – saxophone
- James Smith – trumpet
- Micah Robinson – trombone

Additional musicians

- Ian "Beezy" Coleman – harmony vocals, lead guitar, rhythm guitar
- Carol "Passion" Nelson – harmony vocals
- Rochelle Bradshaw – harmony vocals
- Yvonne Patrick – harmony vocals
- Lesline Kidd – harmony vocals
- Wayne Arnold – lead guitar
- Chris Meridith – bass guitar
- Shawn "Mark" Dawson – drums
- Uziah "Sticky" Thompson – percussion
- Howard "Saxy" Messam – saxophone
- Chico Chin – trumpet

Technicals

- Sonia Rodney – executive producer
- Barry O'Hare – engineering, mixing
- Toby Mountain – mastering
- Joshua Blood – supervisor, lyric transcription
- Anne Murdock – design
- David Corio – photography

== Chart history ==
Chart (1999)	Peak position
US Reggae Albums (Billboard)	9
