= Marcus Garvey (album) =

Studio album by Burning Spear
- Released: December 12, 1975
- Recorded: 1975
- Genre: Reggae
- Length: 33:45
- Label: Island
- Producer: Lawrence Lindo

Burning Spear chronology
Rocking Time (1974)	Marcus Garvey (1975)	Garvey's Ghost (1976)

Alternative cover
- Jamaican release cover

Marcus Garvey is the third album by reggae artist Burning Spear, released in 1975 on Fox Records in Jamaica and then internationally on Island Records later in the year. The album is named after the Jamaican National Hero and Rastafari movement prophet Marcus Garvey. A dub version of it was released four months later as Garvey's Ghost.

This was the first album by Burning Spear recorded for producer Lawrence Lindo, better known by his handle taken from the assassin of Lee Harvey Oswald, Jack Ruby. Apparently, Lindo and Burning Spear realized the opening track to this album, "Marcus Garvey", on their first meeting. Island Records, whose founder Chris Blackwell had been instrumental in breaking Jamaican reggae artists Jimmy Cliff, Toots and the Maytals, and Bob Marley to an international audience, then made a deal to release it internationally, but believed the original Jamaican mix of the album to be too threatening, or at least too commercially unviable, for white audiences and therefore remixed it into what they considered a more palatable form, outraging him. The Jamaican release also does not include the final track, "Resting Place", which had only been issued as a single there. The backing musicians, whom Lindo named the Black Disciples, had been assembled from the Soul Syndicate and the Wailers.

On July 27, 2010, this album was remastered and released by Universal's Hip-O Records reissue imprint in tandem with the dub version on one compact disc.

The album was listed in the 1999 book The Rough Guide: Reggae: 100 Essential CDs.

== Reception ==
Professional ratings
Review scores
Source	Rating
AllMusic	5/5 stars
Christgau's Record Guide	A−
The Encyclopedia of Popular Music	5/5 stars
The Rolling Stone Record Guide	5/5 stars

Ed Ward in a 1976 review in Rolling Stone felt that the music was rootsy and compelling, but that it would not be understood by American audiences, and that the lead song about Marcus Garvey would not make sense to anyone who did not know Jamaican culture.

Robert Christgau felt that it was the most African-sounding and most political reggae album to be released in America at the time.

=== Legacy ===
Jo-Ann Greene in an AllMusic retrospective summary feels that the album was a significant recording in roots reggae, though regrets that Island subsidiary Mango remixed the album too commercially, diluting some of the "haunting atmospheres" of producer Jack Ruby's original mix.

The album was included in Robert Dimery's 1001 Albums You Must Hear Before You Die where Jim Harrington commented that he felt it had "a poignant blend of religious aspirations and cultural concerns".

== Track listing ==
All tracks written by Winston Rodney and Phillip Fullwood except as indicated.

1. "Marcus Garvey" — 3:27
2. "Slavery Days" — 3:34
3. "The Invasion" (W. Rodney, Carl Paisley, Fullwood) — 3:22
4. "Live Good" (Marcus Rodney, Mackba Rodney, Winston Rodney) — 3:14
5. "Give Me" (W. Rodney) — 3:11
6. "Old Marcus Garvey" — 4:03
7. "Tradition" (D. Hines, R. Willington, W. Rodney) — 3:30
8. "Jordan River" (W. Rodney, M. Lawrence, Fullwood) — 3:00
9. "Red, Gold & Green" (A. Folkes, W. Rodney, Fullwood) — 3:14
10. "Resting Place" (W. Rodney) — 3:10 (not on original Jamaican LP release)

== Credits ==
- Burning Spear – lead vocals

The Black Disciples

- Delroy Hines – harmony vocals
- Rupert Willington – harmony vocals
- Bobby Ellis – trumpet
- Vincent "Trommie" Gordon – trombone, clavinet
- Carlton "Sam" Samuels – flute
- Herman Marquis – alto saxophone
- Richard "Dirty Harry" Hall – tenor saxophone
- Tyrone "Organ D" Downie – piano, organ
- Bernard "Touter" Harvey – piano, organ, clavinet
- Earl "Chinna" Smith – lead guitar
- Valentine "Tony" Chin – rhythm guitar
- Robbie "Rabbi" Shakespeare – bass
- Aston "Family Man" Barrett – bass
- Leroy "Horsemouth" Wallace – drums

Production

- Engineers: George Philpott and Errol Thompson
- Recorded at Randy's Recording Studio, North Parade, Kingston, Jamaica
- Mixed at Joe Gibbs Studio, Retirement Crescent, Kingston, Jamaica
