= Studio One Presents Burning Spear =

Studio album by Burning Spear
- Released: 1973
- Genre: Reggae
- Label: Studio One
- Producer: Clement Dodd

Burning Spear chronology
| Studio One Presents Burning Spear (1973) | Rocking Time (1974) |

Alternative cover

Studio One Presents Burning Spear is the debut studio album by Jamaican musician Burning Spear, released in 1973.

Professional ratings
Review scores
| Source | Rating |
|---|---|
| Allmusic | 4.5/5 stars |
| The Encyclopedia of Popular Music | 3/5 stars |

== Track listing ==
=== Side one ===
1. "Ethiopians Live it Out"
2. "We Are Free"
3. "Fire Down Below"
4. "Creation"
5. "Don't Mess with Jill"
6. "Down by the Riverside"

=== Side two ===
1. "Door Peep Shall Not Enter"
2. "Pick Up the Pieces"
3. "Get Ready"
4. "Journey"
5. "Them a Come"
6. "He Prayed"

== Credits ==
- All songs written by Winston Rodney
- Recorded at Jamaica Recording and Publishing Studio
- Music Arranged by Clement Dodd
- Published by JAMREC Music/BMI

== Musicians ==
- The Sound Dimensions
