= Live (Burning Spear album) =

Live album by Burning Spear
- Released: 1977
- Recorded: October 1977
- Genre: Reggae
- Length: 33:47
- Label: Island
- Producer: Denise

Burning Spear chronology
Dry & Heavy (1977)	Live (1977)	Marcus' Children (1978)

Professional ratings
Review scores
Source	Rating
AllMusic	4/5 stars
Robert Christgau	B
The Encyclopedia of Popular Music	2/5 stars

Live is the first live album of the reggae artist Burning Spear, recorded at the Rainbow Theatre with the band Aswad as backup. It was released in 1977.

== Track listing ==
1. "The Ghost" (Marcus Garvey) - 4:40
2. "I and I Survive" (Slavery Days) - 4:19
3. "Black Soul" - 5:36
4. "Lion" - 6:05
5. "Further East of Jack" (Old Marcus Garvey) - 4:53
6. "Man in the Hills" - 4:54
7. "Throw Down Your Arms" - 3:16

== Credits ==
- Recorded live at the Rainbow Theatre, London, England, October, 1977
- Published by Island Music, Inc. (BMI) Except "Lion" and "Throw Down Your Arms" published by Burning Spear Publishing (ASCAP)
- Sound Engineer: Dennis Thompson
- Recorded By Frank Owen, Island Mobile
- Mixed At Island, Hammersmith By Gowin Logie and Terry Barham
- Mastered By John Dent at Trident Studios
- Cover Photos – Peter Murphy and Claire Hershman
- Special Thanks to Dennis Thompson

== Musicians ==
The core of musicians on the album made up the band Aswad.

- Winston Rodney aka Burning Spear – vocals
- Phillip Fullwood – congos
- George Lee – saxophone
- Angus Gaye – drums
- Bobby Ellis – trumpet
- Brinsley Forde – rhythm guitar
- George Oban – bass
- Courtney Hemmings – keyboards
- Donald Griffins – lead guitar
