= Appointment with His Majesty =

Appointment With His Majesty

Studio album by Burning Spear
- Released: 1997
- Recorded: 1997
- Genre: Reggae
- Length: 57:54
- Label: Heartbeat Records
- Producer: Burning Music Production

Burning Spear chronology
| Living Dub Vol. 3 (1996) | Appointment With His Majesty (1997) | Living Dub Vol. 4 (1999) |

Alternative cover
- Burning Music release

Professional ratings
Review scores
| Source | Rating |
|---|---|
| AllMusic | 4/5 stars |
| The Encyclopedia of Popular Music | 3/5 stars |

Appointment With His Majesty is a studio album by the Jamaican reggae singer Burning Spear. It was nominated for a Grammy Award for Best Reggae Album at the 40th Grammy Awards, in 1998.

The album peaked at No. 10 on Billboard's Reggae Albums chart.

== Production ==
The title track is thought to be a polemic about the rise of dancehall music. "Play Jerry" is a tribute to Jerry Garcia.

== Critical reception ==
The Washington Post wrote that "the reggae ... is typically swirling and hypnotic, but this is first and foremost message music." The Boston Globe thought that "the formula is simple: mesmerizing bass lines, snappy horns and Spear's own time-worn voice, reflecting conscious themes and Pan-African concerns." Stereo Review concluded that Spear "remains a quietly persuasive singer with often overlooked knacks for melody and topical bite; 'Commercial Development' and 'Don't Sell Out' strike back at the industrialization of both Jamaica and reggae."

== Track listing ==
- All songs written and arranged by Winston Rodney.
1. "The Future (Clean It Up)" – 4:47
2. "Appointment With His Majesty" – 4:20
3. "Play Jerry" – 4:39
4. "Reggae Physician" – 4:25
5. "Glory Be to Jah" – 5:04
6. "Don't Sell Out" – 4:33
7. "Come in Peace" – 4:23
8. "African Jamaican" – 5:02
9. "My Island" – 4:54
10. "Commercial Development" – 5:21
11. "Music" – 4:54
12. "Loving You" – 4:57

== Credits ==
- Published by Burning Spear Publishing, ASCAP.
- Executive producer – Sonia Rodney
- Recorded at Grove Recording Studio, Ocho Rios, St. Ann's.
- Edited by Barry O'Hare
- Mixed by Barry O'Hare and Winston Rodney.
- Assistant engineer – Bobby Hawthorne
- Project Coordinator for Heartbeat - Garret Vandermolen
- Sequencing - Chris Wilson
- Mastered by Dr. Toby Mountain at Northeastern Digital Recording, Southborough, MA.
- Photography by Dana Siles
- Design by Jean-Pierre LeGuillou

=== Musicians ===
- Winston Rodney - vocals, congas, percussion, background vocals
- Nelson Miller - drums
- James Smith - trumpet
- Lenval Jarrett - rhythm guitar
- Num H.S. Amun’Tehu - percussion, background vocals
- Steven Stewart - keyboards
- Rupert Bent - lead guitar
- Ronald "Nambo" Robinson - trombone
- Howard Messam - saxophone
- Barry O'Hare - keyboard
- Carol "Passion" Nelson - background vocals
- Edna Rodney - background vocals
- Rachell Bradshaw - background vocals
- Yvonne Patrick - background vocals
- Sharon Gordon - background vocals

Additional Musicians

- Tony Williams - drums
- Trevor McKenzie - bass
- Collin Elliot - bass
- Robbie Lyn - keyboard, background vocals
- Ian "Beezy" Coleman - rhythm, lead guitar ("Play Jerry")
- Junior "Chico" Chin - trumpet ("Play Jerry")
- Uziah "Sticky" Thompson - percussion ("Play Jerry")
- Tony Green - saxophone ("Play Jerry")
