= James Noble (actor) =

American actor (1922–2016)

- Born: James Wilkes Noble; March 5, 1922; Dallas, Texas, U. S.
- Died: March 28, 2016 (aged 94); Norwalk, Connecticut, U. S.
- Occupation: Actor
- Years active: 1950–2011
- Spouse: Carolyn Coates (m. 1956; died 2005)
- Children: 1

James Wilkes Noble (March 5, 1922 – March 28, 2016) was an American actor, best known for his portrayal of sweet-natured, dense, naive Governor Eugene X. Gatling on ABC's 1979–1986 sitcom Benson.

== Life and career ==
Noble studied acting and engineering at Southern Methodist University before leaving to serve in the United States Navy during World War II. Returning from the war, Noble studied acting under Lee Strasberg and made appearances in Broadway theater.

His television career started in soap operas such as The Brighter Day, As the World Turns, The Doctors as Dr. Bill Winters and A World Apart. His big screen roles included Reverend John Witherspoon in the film version of the Broadway musical 1776 (1972); assorted roles as doctors in films such as One Summer Love (1976), 10 (1979) and Promises in the Dark (1979); Kaufman, the president's chief of staff, in Being There (1979); Father O'Flanagan in the comedy sequel Airplane II: The Sequel (1982); Sinclair in A Tiger's Tale (1987); Chief Wilkins in the comedy Paramedics (1988) and Dr. Bailey in Chances Are (1989). He was also the spokesman in various Pepto-Bismol commercials in the 1970s and also appeared in various made-for-television films over the course of his career (such as the 1978 tele-film "Breaking Up" with Lee Remick).

Noble played the father of Larry Appleton in the 1980s sitcom Perfect Strangers. Noble played the live-action version of Archie Comics character Hiram Lodge in the movie Archie: To Riverdale and Back Again (1990).

== Personal life ==
Noble was married to actress Carolyn Coates from 1956 until her death in 2005. They had one child, a daughter.

Noble had lived with his family in Leonia, New Jersey, before moving to California in 1980.

== Death ==
Noble died on March 28, 2016, at the age of 94. A spokesman for Noble's family said that the actor had suffered a stroke the week before his death.

== Filmography ==
Year	Title	Role	Notes
1968	What's So Bad About Feeling Good?	Board Member	Uncredited
1971	The Sporting Club	Canon Pritchard	
1971	Been Down So Long It Looks Like Up to Me	Father Pettis	
1972	1776	Rev. John Witherspoon (NJ)	
1974	Who?	General Deptford	
1976	One Summer Love	Dr. Lee	
1976	Death Play	Norman	
1978	Summer of My German Soldier	FBI Agent Pierce	
1979	10	Dr. Miles	
1979	Promises in the Dark	Dr. Blankenship	
1979	Being There	Kaufman	
1982	Airplane II: The Sequel	Father O'Flanagan	
1987	A Tiger's Tale	Sinclair	
1987	You Talkin' to Me?	Peter Archer	
1988	Paramedics	Chief Wilkins	
1989	Chances Are	Dr. Bailey	
1995	Bang	Rooftop Dealer	
2011	Fake	Mssr. Rousseau	
