= Harder Than the Best =

Harder Than The Best

Compilation album by Burning Spear
- Released: 1979
- Recorded: 1979
- Genre: Reggae
- Label: Island

Professional ratings
Review scores
Source	Rating
Allmusic	link
Christgau's Record Guide	A

Harder Than the Best is a 1979 compilation album by Winston Rodney, also known as Burning Spear, a Jamaican roots reggae singer and musician known for his Rastafari movement messages.

== Track listing ==
1. "Marcus Garvey"
2. "Dry and Heavy"
3. "Throw Down Your Arms"
4. "Social Living"
5. "The Invasion (Black Wa-Da-Da)"
6. "Slavery Days"
7. "Old Marcus Garvey"
8. "Man in the Hills"
9. "The Sun"
10. "Civilized Reggae"
