= Kiddus I =

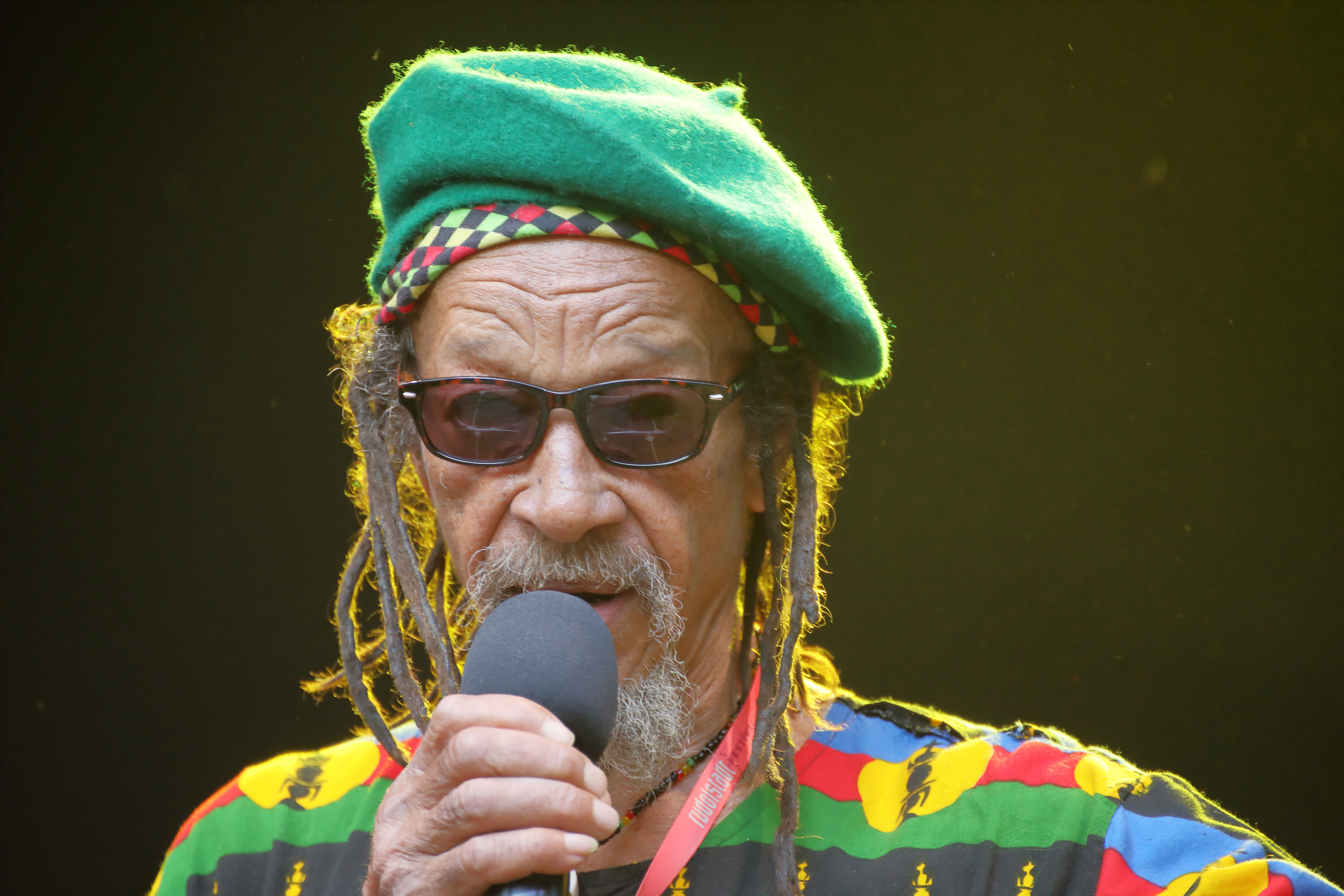
- Kiddus I, Rudolstadt-Festival 2019

Background information
- Born: Frank Louis Dowding Jr. December 1944 (age 81–82)
- Origin: Saint Mary Parish, Jamaica
- Genres: Reggae
- Instruments: Vocals

Kiddus I (born Frank Louis Dowding Jr, December 1944) is a reggae singer and musician, best known for his appearance in the film Rockers.

== Biography ==
Dowding was born in 1944 in Saint Mary Parish, Jamaica. His mother, Maria Cathcart Dowding a home maker and his father, Frank Dowding, a bookkeeper. He adopted the stage name Kiddus, which is Amharic for "blessed one", after becoming a Rastafarian. In 1971, he set up a Rastafarian commune and craft centre located between uptown and downtown Kingston, which became a unique feature of a city generally divided by social class.

Dowding was a member of Ras Michael's Sons Of Negus from 1971 to 1978, singing and playing funde drums. He recorded several self-productions in 1972 with Aston Barrett at Joe Gibbs' studio, but these were not released due to lack of funds. Rockers director Theodoros Bafaloukos had seen Kiddus recording "Graduation In Zion" in 1976, two years before the film was made, and decided to film Kiddus recording the track as part of the movie.

Kiddus had by then released a few singles on his own Shepherd label, including "Security In The Streets" which was recorded with Lee Perry at his Black Ark studio. Dowding was a prominent member of the Peace Movement, and "Security in the Streets" was one of the first of several songs recorded in appreciation of the Peace Treaty of 1978 between rival political gang-leaders Claudie Massop and Bucky Marshall.

After releasing a handful of further singles, and recording an album that was not released due to the master tapes getting lost, little was heard of Kiddus I until French label Makasound issued Inna De Yard in 2005, one of a series of albums recorded acoustically by vintage reggae artists in Jamaica. Japanese label Dub Store Records then reissued some of the 1970s singles, followed by the anthology Graduation In Zion: 1978-1980 in 2007. In June 2009, Kiddus I released Green Fa Life (Naya Records), remarkably his first full-length electric instrumentation album of his 30+ year career. Green Fa Life sees Kiddus I team up with roots reggae legends Earl "Chinna" Smith and Leroy 'Horsemouth' Wallace, although that is naming just a few of the very respected heavy weight artists who also play on the album. Kiddus I also appears on the first two "Grass Yard Productions" albums [Naya Records] released 2009 with the tracks "Merry Chase" and "Shine Your Light". Both Grass Yard Productions: Vol1 & Vol2 has Kiddus I sharing studio time with other stella Jamaican musicians such as Ken Bob, Johnny "Dizzy" Moore, Jamel, Don I, Ken Boothe, Israel Voice, Jahmali and Michh "Shemaiah" Abrahams.

Around 2009 he set up the Green Fa Life project, promoting planting of the Moringa tree and products derived from it.

In 2007, a copy of his album tapes from 1981 were discovered, and his debut album was finally released in 2009 as Rocking Rebel Volumes 1&2.

In 2014 he staged the first Rastaman Vibration concert in Cheapside, St. Elizabeth, with the intention of expanding it into a festival in future years.

== Albums ==
- Inna De Yard (2005), Makasound
- Graduation In Zion: 1978-1980 (2007), Dub Store
- Green Fa Life (2009), Naya
- Rocking Rebel Volumes 1&2 (2009)
- Topsy Turvy World (2013)
- Take A Trip (2015)
- Topsy Turvy Dub (2018)
- Stick to the Course (2018)
- Shepard Singles: 1979-1985 (2023)
