= Chant Down Babylon: The Island Anthology =

Compilation album by Burning Spear
- Released: 1996
- Genre: Roots reggae
- Label: Island/PolyGram Records

Professional ratings
Review scores
Source	Rating
AllMusic	5/5 stars
The Encyclopedia of Popular Music	4/5 stars

Chant Down Babylon: The Island Anthology is a compilation album by Burning Spear. It was released by Island Records in 1996.

== Track listing ==
=== Disc one ===
1. "Marcus Garvey" (Winston Rodney, Phillip Fullwood)
2. "Slavery Days" (Rodney, Fullwood)
3. "I & I Survive" (Rodney, Fullwood)
4. "Old Marcus Garvey" (Rodney, Fullwood)
5. "Tradition" (Rodney, Delroy Hines, Rupert Willington)
6. "The Invasion (A.K.A. Black Wa-Da-Da)" (Rodney, C. Paisley, Fullwood)
7. "Door Peep" (Rodney)
8. "No More War" (Rodney)
9. "Black Soul" (Rodney)
10. "Man In The Hills" (Rodney)
11. "Cultivation" (Rodney)
12. "The Sun" (Rodney, Fullwood, Don Taylor)
13. "It's A Long Way Around" (Rodney, Fullwood)
14. "Throw Down Your Arms" (Rodney)
15. "Dry & Heavy" (Rodney)
16. "Black Disciples" (Rodney)
17. "The Lion" (live) (Rodney)
18. "Jordan River" (live) (Rodney, M. Lawrence, Fullwood)
19. "Jah No Dead" (Rodney)

=== Disc two ===
1. "Marcus Children Suffer" (Rodney)
2. "Social Living" (Rodney)
3. "Marcus Say Jah No Dead" (Rodney)
4. "Nyah Keith" (Rodney)
5. "Civilize Reggae" (Rodney)
6. "Mek We Dweet" (Rodney)
7. "My Roots" (Rodney)
8. "Recall Some Great Men" (Rodney)
9. "Great Men's Dub" (Rodney)
10. "One People" (Rodney)
11. "African Women" (Rodney)
12. "Jah Kingdom" (Rodney)
13. "Praise H.I.M." (Rodney)
14. "Should I" (Rodney)
15. "Estimated Prophet" (Robert Weir, John Perry Barlow)
16. "Thank You" (Rodney)

== Credits ==
- Compilation produced by Jerry Rappaport
- Executive producers Bill Levenson and Trevor Wyatt
- Digitally mastered by Joseph M. Palmaccio, PolyGram Studios
- Additional mastering by Suha Gur, PolyGram Studios
- Essay by Amy Wachtel
- Package design by Aldo Sampieri
- Photographers: David Corio (front cover), Chris Carroll, Adrian Boot, Dennis Morris
- Project coordination by Terry Tierney
- Project assistance by Catherine Ladis
- Special thanks: Chris Blackwell, Hooman Majd, Jon Baker, Pat Monaco, Holly Ferguson, Harry Weinger, Pattie Chirico and the staff at the Polygram Studios and the staff at Island Studios, London.
