= Living Dub Vol. 1 =

Living Dub Volume 1

Studio album by Burning Spear
- Released: 1979
- Recorded: 1979
- Genre: Reggae
- Length: 30:50 (Heartbeat CD)
- Label: Burning Spear
- Producer: Winston Rodney

Burning Spear chronology
Marcus' Children (1978)	Living Dub Volume 1 (1979)	Hail H.I.M. (1980)

Alternative cover
- Burning Music release

Living Dub Volume 1 is a studio album by reggae artist Burning Spear. It is a dub mix of the 1978 album Social Living.

Originally released on vinyl in 1979, the album's first CD issue came in 1991 on a Jamaican release by Dee Jay Records and featured the same mix as the 1979 album. The second CD release came in 1993 on Heartbeat Records, but this time featured a completely new remix created specially for the CD.

The original 1979 mix was restored to CD in 2002 as Original Living Dub Vol. 1, on Burning Music. Both mixes credit Winston Rodney (Burning Spear) with production. The 1979 mix was created by Sylvan Morris, the 1993 mix by Barry O'Hare.

== Critical reception ==
Professional ratings
Review scores
Source	Rating
AllMusic	3/5 stars
Calgary Herald	B
The Virgin Encyclopedia of Seventies Music	3/5 stars

Reviewing a reissue, the Calgary Herald wrote that the "remixed, stripped-down, mostly instrumental tracks pulsate with hypnotic rhythms and sparse, vocal echoes."

== Track listing ==
1. Children of Today
2. Present
3. Associate
4. Jah Boto
5. In Those Days
6. Run Come Dub
7. Help Us
8. Musiya
9. All Over
10. Hill Street Dub (Heartbeat release only)
