= Rocking Time =

Studio album by Burning Spear
- Released: 1974
- Recorded: Jamaica Recording & Publishing Studio LTD
- Genre: Reggae
- Label: Studio One
- Producer: Clement Dodd

Burning Spear chronology
| Studio One Presents Burning Spear (1973) | Rocking Time (1974) | Marcus Garvey (1975) |

Professional ratings
Review scores
| Source | Rating |
|---|---|
| Allmusic | 4.5/5 stars |
| The Encyclopedia of Popular Music | 3/5 stars |

Rocking Time is the second studio album by Jamaican musician Burning Spear, released in 1974 (see 1974 in music) on the Studio One label.

His second album for Studio One, Rocking Time featured bass guitarist Leroy Sibbles and drummer Leroy "Horsemouth" Wallace. The album was described by AllMusic as "cosmic reggae at its rawest" and "the very epitome of conscious music".

== Track listing ==
1. "Call On You"
2. "Foggy Road"
3. "Swell Headed"
4. "Girls Like You"
5. "Old Time Saying"
6. "Bad To Worst"
7. "What A Happy Day"
8. "This Race"
9. "Walla Walla"
10. "Rocking Time"
11. "Weeping And Wailing"
12. "Mamie"

== Credits ==
- All Songs Written By Winston Rodney and Clement Dodd
- Published by Jamrec Music Publishers
- Recorded at Jamaica Recording and Publishing Studio
- Recording Engineering: Clement Dodd
- Produced & Arranged by Clement Dodd
