= Jah No Dead =

Compilation album by Burning Spear
- Released: 2003
- Genre: Reggae
- Length: 52:40
- Label: Island

Professional ratings
Review scores
Source	Rating
Allmusic	4.5/5 stars
Muzik	4/5 stars

Jah No Dead is a compilation album by Burning Spear released in 2003. The tracks are compiled from five albums that Burning Spear released on Island in the 1970s.

== Track listing ==
1. "Social Living" - Long Version
2. "Marcus Say Jah No Dead"
3. "Slavery Days"
4. "The Invasion"
5. "Marcus Garvey"
6. "Man in the Hills" - Album Version
7. "Throw Down Your Arms"
8. "People Get Ready" - Album Version
9. "Dry & Heavy"
10. "Civilised Reggae"
11. "I and I Survive" (Slavery Days)
12. "The Ghost" (Marcus Garvey)
13. "Jah No Dead"
