= Reggae Greats: Lee "Scratch" Perry =

Reggae Greats

Greatest hits album by Lee "Scratch" Perry & Various Artists
- Released: 1984
- Recorded: 1976–1979
- Studio: Black Ark, Kingston, Jamaica
- Genre: Reggae
- Label: Mango
- Producer: Lee "Scratch" Perry

Professional ratings
Review scores
Source	Rating
AllMusic	4.5/5 stars

Reggae Greats: Lee "Scratch" Perry is a 1984 Island Records compilation album featuring Lee "Scratch" Perry. It focuses mainly on his work as a producer/composer rather than a singer. Perry only sings on three of the songs. All of the tracks are from the period between 1976 and 1979, and were recorded at Perry's Black Ark studio. The album is generally considered a good introduction to Perry's Black Ark work, and is often chosen as the best single album by Perry, but with tracks drawn from Perry's popular late 1970s albums, it has also been described as "not essential" and containing "no surprises".

== Track listing ==
1. "Party Time" – The Heptones
2. "Police and Thieves" – Junior Murvin
3. "Groovy Situation" – Keith Rowe
4. "Soul Fire" – Lee Perry
5. "War Ina Babylon" – Max Romeo
6. "Wisdom" – Jah Lion
7. "To Be a Lover" – George Faith
8. "Roast Fish and Cornbread" – Lee Perry
9. "Croaking Lizard" – Prince Jazzbo
10. "Dreadlocks in Moonlight" – Lee Perry
