= Living Dub Vol. 4 =

Living Dub Volume 4

Studio album by Burning Spear
- Released: 1999
- Genre: Reggae
- Label: Heartbeat Records; Declic
- Producer: Burning Music Production

Burning Spear chronology
Appointment with His Majesty (1997)	Living Dub Volume 4 (1999)	Calling Rastafari (1999)

Alternative cover

Professional ratings
Review scores
Source	Rating
AllMusic	3/5 stars

Living Dub Volume 4 is an album by the Jamaican reggae musician Burning Spear, released in 1999.

== Critical reception ==
The New Zealand Herald thought that "while being generally good smoky stuff, it doesn't bear comparison with his crucial Marcus Garvey/Garvey's Ghost and Social Living/Living Dub pairings from way back which drop your unsuspecting brain down an elevator shaft."

AllMusic wrote that "it's not exactly easy listening, but to those with ears to hear, Burning Spear makes some of the most compelling reggae there is."

== Track listing ==
1. Dub It Clean
2. Dub Appointment
3. First Time Dub
4. Physician Dub
5. Jah Dub
6. Dub Smart
7. Peaceful Dub
8. Dub African
9. My Island Dub
10. Music Dub
11. Loving Dub

== Credits ==
- All songs written and arranged by Winston Rodney.
- Published by Burning Music Publishing, ASCAP.
- Executive Producer: Sonia Rodney
- Recorded at Grove Recording Studio, Ocho Rios, St. Ann's, Jamaica
- Edited by Barry O'Hare
- Mixed by Barry O'Hare and Winston Rodney.
- Assistant engineer: Bobby Hawthorne
- Mastered by Toby Mountain at Northeastern Digital Recording, Southborough, Mass.
- Photography and back cover art © Dana Siles 1997
- Cover photo-montage by Francisco Gonzalez.
- Design by Jean-Pierre LeGuillou.
- Album supervision by Chris Wilson.

== Musicians ==
- Winston Rodney - vocals, congas, percussion, background vocals
- Nelson Miller - drums
- James Smith - trumpet
- Lenval Jarrett - rhythm guitar
- Num H.S. Amun'Tehu - percussion, background vocals
- Steven Stewart - keyboards
- Rupert Bent - lead guitar
- Ronald "Nambo" Robinson - trombone
- Howard Messam - saxophone
- Barry O'Hare - keyboard
- Carol "Passion" Nelson - background vocals
- Edna Rodney - background vocals
- Rachell Bradshaw - background vocals
- Yvonne Patrick - background vocals
- Sharon Gordon - background vocals

=== Additional musicians ===
- Tony Williams - drums
- Trevor McKenzie - bass
- Collin Elliot - bass
- Robbie Lyn - keyboard, background vocals
- Beezy Coleman - rhythm, lead guitar ("Play Jerry")
- Junior "Chico" Chin - trumpet ("Play Jerry")
- Uziah "Sticky" Thompson - percussion ("Play Jerry")
- Tony Green - saxophone ("Play Jerry")
