= Living Dub Vol. 3 =

Living Dub Volume 3

Studio album by Burning Spear
- Released: 1996
- Recorded: 1996
- Genre: Reggae
- Label: Heartbeat Records
- Producer: Winston Rodney

Burning Spear chronology
Rasta Business (1995)	Living Dub Volume 3 (1996)	Appointment with His Majesty (1997)

Living Dub Volume 3 is a dub album of reggae music by the Jamaican singer Burning Spear (Winston Rodney). It was released in 1996.

== Track listing ==
1. Dub Peace
2. Dub Creation
3. Dub Not Stupid
4. Dub Subject in School
5. Dub This Man
6. Dub Rastaman
7. Dub Legal
8. Dub Nation
9. Dub the World
10. Dub Old Timer
11. Dub Africa
12. Dub Burning
13. Dub Business
14. Dub Lovin

== Credits ==
- All Songs Written by Winston Rodney and Published by Burning Spear Publishing, ASCAP
- Executive Producer - Burning Music Productions
- Recorded at Grove Recording Studio, Ocho Rios, St. Ann, Jamaica
- Recording Engineer - Barry O'Hare
- Mixed by Barry O'Hare except: "World Dub" and "Loving Dub" mixed by Michael Sauvage
- Project Coordinator for Heartbeat - Garret Vandermolen
- Mastered by Dr. Toby Mountain at Northeastern Digital Recording, Southborough, MA
- Special Thanks To Karl Young, Barry O'Hare, Tedo Davis, Sonia Rodney, Anthony "Jolly" Rhoden, Carolyn Marr, and Mutabaruka

=== Musicians ===
- Winston Rodney - vocals, percussion, akete, harmony
- Nelson Miller - drums, percussion, backing vocals on "Subject In School"
- Paul Beckford - bass
- Lenford Richards - lead guitar, funde
- Lenval "Shayar" Jarrett - rhythm guitar
- Jay Noel - synthesizer on "Africa" and "Creation"
- Alvin Haughton - percussion
- James Smith - trumpet
- Charles Dickey - trombone
- Mark Wilson - saxophone

Additional Musicians

- Robbie Lyn - piano, synthesizers
- Basil Cunningham - bass on "Legal "Hustlers"
- Dean Fraser - saxophone
- Ronald "Nambo" Robinson - trombone
- Junior "Chico" Chin - trumpet
- Uziah "Sticky" Thompson - percussion
- Carol "Passion" Nelson - harmony vocals
- Rupert Bent - lead guitar
- Archibald "Tedo" Davis - backing vocals on "Subject In School"
