= Peace and Love (sculpture) =

- Artist: Ringo Starr
- Medium: Polished steel
- Weight: 800 pounds
- Location: Beverly Hills, California, United States; 34°4′21.9″N 118°24′9.1″W

Peace and Love is a public sculpture in Beverly Hills, California. It was designed by Ringo Starr, who resides in Beverly Hills. The sculpture is a polished steel depiction of Starr's hand making a peace sign, and it weighs 800 pounds. Starr shipped the original bronze version of the sculpture from the United Kingdom to Beverly Hills when he moved there.

Ringo Starr planned to donate the sculpture to Beverly Hills in 2017, but the city's former Fine Art Commission unanimously rejected the gift because it did not fit their definition of "art". In 2019, the city council of Beverly Hills changed its position, accepting the sculpture. The sculpture was placed in front of the City Hall with the support of then-mayor John A. Mirisch.
