= Reggae Greats (Burning Spear album) =

Reggae Greats: Best of the Island Years 1975-1978

Greatest hits album by Burning Spear
- Released: 1984
- Genre: Reggae
- Label: Island

Professional ratings
Review scores
Source	Rating
AllMusic	4/5 stars
Robert Christgau	A−
The Encyclopedia of Popular Music	4/5 stars

Reggae Greats is a best of album by reggae artist Burning Spear. The album is subtitled "Best of the Island Years 1975-1978" and was released in 1984.

== Track listing ==
1. Door Peep
2. Slavery Days
3. Lion
4. Black Disciples
5. Man in the Hills
6. Tradition
7. Throw Down Your Arms
8. Social Living
9. Marcus Garvey
10. Dry & Heavy
11. Black WA-DA-DA (Invasion)
12. The Sun
