= Big Joe (reggae) =

- Born: Joseph Spalding; 1955 (age 69–70)
- Origin: Kingston, Jamaica
- Genres: Reggae
- Occupation: musician

Big Joe (born Joseph Spalding; 1955) is a Jamaican reggae deejay and record producer, who recorded extensively in the 1970s and early 1980s.

== Biography ==
Spalding was born in Kingston, Jamaica in 1955, and began his recording career in the early 1970s working with producer Harry Mudie. He then worked with producer Winston Edwards and had a hit single with "Selassie Skank". He moved on to record for Coxsone Dodd at Studio One and set up his own Small Axe Hi Fi sound system and a record label. In 1978, he was part of the cast of the movie Rockers, directed by Ted Bafaloukos, where he played himself, doing toasting at a sound system party alongside producer and sound system operator Jack Ruby. In the 2000s Spalding had success as a hip hop producer and recording engineer.

== Discography ==
- Keep Rocking And Swinging (1976) Celluloid
- At The Control (1978) Live & Love
- African Princess (1978) Thompson Sound/Trojan
