= Richard Hall (musician) =

Jamaican saxophonist

Richard "Dirty Harry" Hall
- Also known as: Dirty Harry
- Born: Richard Hall
- Origin: Jamaica
- Genre: Reggae
- Occupation: Instrumentalist
- Instrument: Tenor saxophone

Richard Hall was a Jamaican saxophonist who worked with many reggae artists including Peter Tosh and Burning Spear. Nicknamed "Dirty Harry," he also starred in the 1978 film Rockers alongside Leroy "Horsemouth" Wallace.

== Biography ==
Born October 7, 1951 Former Alpha Boys school student, Richard Hall was well known for his tenor saxophone playing. In 1974, he played on Jacob Miller's "Keep On Knocking" for Augustus Pablo's Rockers Production team. In 1975, he was asked to contribute to Burning Spear's Marcus Garvey album, which featured the Black Disciples band. He also played on Augustus Pablo's dub album King Tubbys Meets Rockers Uptown and Peter Tosh's second solo album, Equal Rights. The film Rockers features Richard Hall, alongside Bobby Ellis, Herman Marquis and Tommy McCook, playing "Satta A Massagana" in a backyard. Hall also appeared on the cover of the VHS release.

Hall was shot and killed during a robbery in the East Village, Manhattan.
