= Love & Peace: Burning Spear Live! =

Live album by Burning Spear
- Released: 1994
- Recorded: 1993
- Genre: Reggae
- Length: 55:17
- Label: Heartbeat Records
- Producer: Winston Rodney

Love & Peace: Burning Spear Live! is a live album by Jamaican musician Burning Spear, released by Heartbeat Records in 1994. It was recorded on tour at various venues throughout the USA during the summer of 1993.

== Critical reception ==
Professional ratings
Review scores
Source	Rating
AllMusic	4.5/5 stars

AllMusic said that the album "comes closer to capturing the pure excitement and gospel-like devotion of a Burning Spear gig than most live albums", and rated it 4.5/5 stars.

== Track listing ==
All tracks are written by Winston Rodney.

No.	Title	Length
1.	"The Sun"	5:57
2.	"I Stand Strong"	5:02
3.	"Come Come"	6:22
4.	"Take A Look"	10:21
5.	"Mek We Dweet"	3:27
6.	"Great Men"	4:58
7.	"Jah Kingdom"	5:46
8.	"Mi Gi Dem"	5:50
9.	"Peace"	7:31
Total length:		55:17

== Credits ==
Musicians

- Winston Rodney - vocals, percussion

The Burning Band:

- Nelson Miller - drums
- Paul Beckford - bass
- Lenford Richards - lead guitar
- Lenval Jarrett - rhythm guitar
- Alvin Haughton - percussion
- Jay Noel - keyboards
- James Smith - trumpet
- Charles Dickey - trombone
- Mark Wilson - saxophone

Other credits

- Winston Rodney - production
- Mervyn Williams - recording, mixing
- Michael Sauvage - remixing at Pilot Studio, N.Y.
- Dr. Toby Mountain - mastering at Northeastern Digital
- David Corio - photography
- Nancy Given - design
