= Theodoros Bafaloukos =

Greek director and screenwriter

Theodoros Bafaloukos (May 18, 1946 – 2016) was a director, screenwriter and production designer from Greece known for his work in Jamaica and the U.S. He directed Rockers, the 1970s era film about Jamaican music and culture.

Bafaloukos was born on the island of Andros in Greece. He traveled to Jamaica as a photographer in 1975 where he was briefly detained under suspicion of being a CIA spy. He lived on the island and became friends with Augustus Pablo who features in the film. The film became an influential classic. TimeOut called it a Trenchtown variant on the story of Robin Hood. It premiered at the San Francisco Film Festival in 1978 and was shown at the Cannes Film Festival the same year as Apocalypse Now. It was received enthusiastically. Le Monde said it was not a film but a work of art.

Bafaloukos also made music videos and was a production designer for Barry Levinson, Errol Morris, and Jonathan Demme. He was Art Director for Aerosmith's music video for "Cryin'" (1993) featuring Alicia Silverstone.

Bafaloukos appears as George in Barry Levinson's 1982 film Diner and was a creative consultant for the film.

== Filmography ==
- Fog of War, production designer
