= Bobby Ellis =

Jamaican trumpet player

Bobby Ellis OD
- Born: 2 July 1932; Kingston, Jamaica
- Died: 18 October 2016 (aged 84) Kingston, Jamaica
- Genres: Reggae
- Instrument: Trumpet

Bobby Ellis OD (2 July 1932 – 18 October 2016) was a Jamaican trumpet player. He worked with many reggae artists including Peter Tosh, Burning Spear and The Revolutionaries.

== Biography ==
Born in Kingston on 2 October 1932, Bobby Ellis attended the Alpha Boys School which is famous for its musical alumni. While at this school Ellis received tuition on the trumpet and flugelhorn. The school's music curriculum consisted of marches, waltzes and classical pieces which gave Ellis an extensive knowledge of timing, harmony and form. These factors have contributed to his work as a horn arranger for the Studio One. He also acted as arranger for producer Jack Ruby and was part of Ruby's studio band the Black Disciples, playing on Burning Spear's Marcus Garvey album and going on to tour as part of Spear's band for twelve years. He also played and co-arranged (with Tommy McCook) the horns on Bunny Wailer's 1976 album Blackheart Man.

In 1978, Ellis made a brief cameo in the film Rockers directed by Ted Bafaloukos. He was also part of the Rockers All Stars, the group responsible for the film's instrumental music.

In August 2014 it was announced that he would receive the Order of Distinction (Officer Class) in October that year.

Ellis died at the University Hospital of the West Indies on 18 October 2016, aged 84, from a pneumonia-related illness.

== Discography ==
Solo

- Rent a Tile (2014)

with Tommy McCook

- Green Mango (1974), Attack - Tommy & Bobby
- Blazing Horns (1977), Grove Music - Tommy McCook and Bobby Ellis
- Tommy McCook Featuring Bobby Ellis (2004), Attack

other collaborations

- Bobby Ellis & the Professionals Meet the Revolutionaries (1977), Third World

With Herbie Mann

- Reggae (Atlantic, 1973)
- Reggae II (Atlantic, 1973 [1976])
