= Herman Marquis =

Jamaican saxophone musician

Herman Marquis is a Jamaican saxophone musician who has played with many reggae artists including Burning Spear. He recorded for Arthur "Duke" Reid in the 1960s and was a member of The Revolutionaries and The Upsetters in the 1970s. He was much in demand as a session player throughout the 1970s and 1980s, playing with some of Jamaica's top stars including Gregory Isaacs, Dennis Brown, Bunny Wailer, and Justin Hinds.

In 1978, Marquis made a brief cameo in the film Rockers directed by Ted Bafaloukos. He was also part of the Rockers All Stars, the group responsible for the film's instrumental music.

He continued through to the mid-1980s and worked with Burning Spear and Ernest Ranglin.
