= Count Suckle =

Jamaican sound system operator

Wilbert Augustus Campbell (12 August 1931 – 19 May 2014), known as Count Suckle, was a Jamaica-born sound system operator and club owner who was influential in the development of ska and reggae music, and African-Caribbean culture, in the United Kingdom.

== Biography ==
He was born in Kingston, Jamaica, and grew up in poverty as one of thirteen children. His friends included Aloysius "Lucky" Gordon and Vincent "Duke Vin" Forbes. He began supplying records for sound system operator Tom the Great Sebastian, and in 1952 he, Vin and Lenny Fry stowed away on a banana boat. They reached London, where they settled in Ladbroke Grove. By about 1956 he was running the Count Suckle Sound System in competition with the one established by Duke Vin, with whom he had several sound clashes. Suckle built up a large following within the African-Caribbean community by playing at private parties, and began attracting an audience of white musicians through his bookings at the Flamingo Club in Soho.

In 1961, he became the resident DJ at the Roaring Twenties club at 50 Carnaby Street, where he began showcasing records sent to him privately by Prince Buster in Jamaica as well as R&B record labels in the US. His clientele included mods and leading white musicians Georgie Fame, the Rolling Stones and John Paul Jones. However, the club was regularly targeted by police raids. In 1964 he began managing his own club, the Cue (later Q) club at 5a Praed Street, Paddington. This played a mixture of ska, reggae, soul and funk music, as well as featuring live performances by leading Jamaican and American musicians including Prince Buster and Edwin Starr. In 1970 he also ran Q Records, a short-lived subsidiary of the Trojan record label.

In 1974, Suckle said of the club:

We lead the field because we've always moved with the times at the Q club. When we opened ska music was the thing, Prince Buster, Don Drummond, Reco, Tommy McCook, Roland Alphonso, Baba Brooks y'know. They all played here when they toured London. We played all the latest things and the new dances caught on quick.... The Q club is international so we have to mix the records. A few years ago soul was the thing so we used to play more soul.... You just got to stay with the times. If they wanna hear reggae we'll play reggae, if they want rock and roll we'll play it... .

The Q Club changed its name to the People's Club in 1981, and finally closed in 1986, when Suckle retired. In 2008, Suckle contributed to the documentary film Duke Vin, Count Suckle and the Birth of Ska, directed by Gus Berger.

Count Suckle died of a heart attack on 19 May 2014 at his home in Edgware Road, London.
