= Selwyn Baptiste =

Steelpan musician; organiser of the Notting Hill Carnival (1936–2012)

Selwyn Baptiste (10 July 1936 – 5 January 2012) was a Trinidad and Tobago-born pioneer of the introduction of the steel drum into Britain, forming the country's second steel band in 1967, and early organizer of London's Notting Hill Carnival. An educator as well as a pannist, a percussionist and drummer, he is credited with bringing about the teaching of steelpan playing throughout the UK.

== Biography ==
Selwyn Baptiste was born in La Romaine, near San Fernando, Trinidad and Tobago, on 10 July 1936.

He moved to Britain at the age of 24, in 1960, having that year won the title of "Best Pan Soloist" at the Trinidad Carnival. With the Caribbean Trio steelband in the 1960s, he played in Switzerland, US bases in Germany, and NATO bases in France and the Netherlands. A gifted musician, he started a course studying music at Dartington College of Arts but, according to cultural activist Ra Hendricks, Baptiste "became disenchanted with the set-up in the educational institution and found his way to Ladbroke Grove".

Baptiste soon became involved in community educational work in the area, and began teaching children to play the steel pan at the Wornington Road adventure playground (now the Venture Centre) off Golborne Road in North Kensington, joining forces with community worker Rhaune Laslett. By 1970, "the Notting Hill Carnival consisted of 2 music bands, the Russell Henderson Combo and Selwyn Baptiste’s Notting Hill Adventure Playground Steelband and 500 dancing spectators."

In the 1970s Baptiste was instrumental in bringing about the close association of The Tabernacle in Notting Hill with Carnival. As noted in one tribute to him: "Those who recall the Sundays in the Tabernacle during the run-up to the Bank Holiday weekend in the mid- to late-70s – with Metronomes and Ebony Steelbands, DJs Shadow, Lord Sam and the young Freddie - will remember that it was a nondescript community hall. He gave it Carnival purpose." In 2011, the Tabernacle honoured Baptiste with a lifetime achievement award.

Baptiste founded the Carnival Development Committee in 1975, chairing it until 1979. In the words of Alex Pascall, a former chair of the Carnival and Arts Committee: "Baptiste put his heart and soul into educating young people about Caribbean culture using the steel band. He was a deeply cultural person and was very concerned about the welfare of young people."

In a 1977 television documentary, Baptiste was quoted as saying:

"Carnival is not a political event. Carnival is a cultural event. It is something which supersedes political ideologies. Carnival is something that's big enough to accommodate all forms of thought, all sorts of themes. Politics is part of it, but it is not an exclusively political event."

A 2014 BBC iPlayer film by his son, journalist and programme-maker Wyn Baptiste, entitled Who Started It?, explored the origins of the Notting Hill Carnival.
