= Duke Vin =

Jamaican-born sound system operator (1928–2012)

- Born: Vincent George Forbes; 25 October 1928; Kingston, Jamaica
- Died: 3 November 2012 (aged 84); London, England, United Kingdom
- Occupation: Sound system operator
- Years active: 1955–2009
- Known for: Operating the first Jamaican-style sound system in the UK

Vincent George Forbes (25 October 1928 – 3 November 2012), better known as Duke Vin, was a Jamaican-born sound system operator and selector who operated the first sound system in the United Kingdom.

== Biography ==
Born in Kingston, Jamaica, Forbes was raised on Wildman Street and attended the Calabar All-Age School.

He began his career as a selector on the Tom the Great Sebastian sound system in the early 1950s, being given a chance after helping Tom Wong to change a tyre on his car. At the time, Forbes was known as "Shine-Shoes Vinny" due to his smart appearance.

After travelling to England in 1954 as a stowaway on a boat from Kingston, he found work as an engine cleaner for British Rail, becoming an electrician two years later. He built his first sound system in 1955 using a second-hand turntable bought from a shop in Edgware Road, a speaker bought for £15 and an amplifier built for £4, soon establishing "Duke Vin the Tickler's", in Ladbroke Grove, London, the first Jamaican-style sound system in the UK. The sound system played an important part in popularising ska in Britain. He initially played R&B but soon concentrated on Jamaican music – he was supplied with fresh Jamaican releases, including many from Studio One, by the Daddy Peckings shop in West London. Fellow Jamaican Count Suckle soon set up a sound system in the same area, leading to a rivalry between the two and several sound clashes, with Vin involved in the UK's first clash in 1958.

In the 1960s his sound played at top London clubs, including The Marquee and The Flamingo.

In the late 1960s he served time in prison after being convicted of pimping, a charge that he denied. On his release, he built a larger sound system and bought a house off Harrow Road. One of the tracks that exclusively featured on his sound system was "The Tickler", a track produced by Derrick Harriott that was unavailable elsewhere until it was released in 2006.

In 1973, Forbes was one of the founders of the Notting Hill Carnival, and performed at the event for 37 years, despite suffering a stroke in his later years.

He was the subject of the 2009 documentary film Duke Vin and the Birth of Ska, directed by Gus Berger.

Forbes died in London on 3 November 2012.
