= Rakhmaninov (surname) =

Russian surname

Rakhmaninov, feminine: Rakhmaninova is a Russian patronymic surname, also spelled as Rachmaninov or Rachmaninoff associated with the noble Russian Rakhmaninov family. Boris Unbegaun suggests that is derived from the nickname rakhmanin, which either meant "Indian person" (corrupted "brahman") or was derived from the adjective rakhmanny with various meanings. Notable people with the surname include:

- Sergei Rachmaninoff, composer
- Ivan Rakhmaninov (1753–1807), Russian publisher, translator and educator
- Maria Rakhmaninova
- Yuri Rachmaninov (1936–2007), Soviet and Russian scientist, great-nephew of Sergei Rachmaninoff

== See also ==
- Rachmaninoff (disambiguation)
- Rakhmanin
- Rakhmanov
- Rakhman
