= Rakhmanin =

Russian surname

Rakhmanin, feminine: Rakhmanin is a Russian surname, also spelled as Rachmanin. Boris Unbegaun suggests that is derived from the nickname rakhmanin, which either meant "Indian person" (corrupted "brahman") or was derived from the adjective rakhmanny with various meanings. Notable people with the surname include:

- Nikita Rakhmanin
- Sergey Rakhmanin
- Serhiy Rakhmanin
- Oleg Rakhmanin
- Vladimir Rakhmanin

== See also ==
- Rakhmaninov
- Rakhmanov
- Rakhman
