= Coleherne, Earl's Court =

Former gay pub in Earl's Court, London

Coleherne, Earls Court
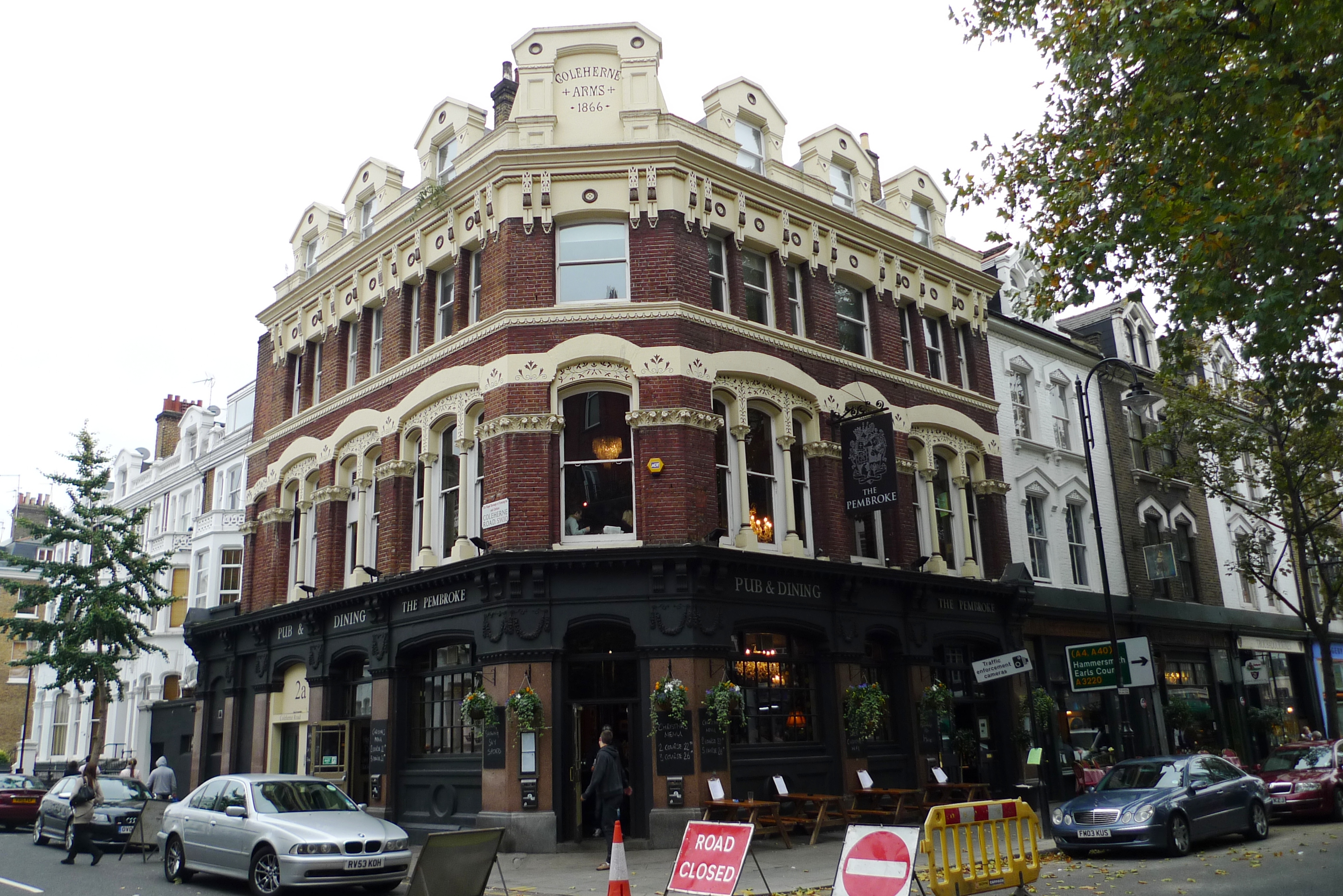
- Rebranded as The Pembroke, 2011

General information
- Location: 261 Old Brompton Road, Earl's Court,, London, England
- Coordinates: 51.4889°N 0.1915°W

The Coleherne Arms 1866 public house was a gay pub in west London. Located at 261 Old Brompton Road, Earl's Court, it was a well-known music venue from the 1950s, and a popular landmark leather bar during the 1970s and 1980s. In 2008, it was rebranded as a gastropub, The Pembroke.

== History ==
The Coleherne Arms 1866 (named after the Coleherne family) began life in 1866, at 261 Old Brompton Road. It had a long history of attracting a bohemian clientele before becoming known as a gay pub. A lifelong resident of Earl's Court Square, Jennifer Ware, recollected as a child being taken there to Sunday lunch in the 1930s; at that time, drag entertainers performed after lunch had finished.

=== Music and the Afro-Caribbean community ===
For over three decades, The Coleherne was celebrated for its Sunday lunchtime music sessions, cutting across barriers of race, class, age and sexual orientation in a way unique in London. Starting with traditional jazz in the mid-1950s, followed by modern jazz, the seal was set in 1962 when pianist Russell Henderson arrived with two young students, fellow Trinidadians, to play their own brand of calypso-flavoured Latin jazz.

Henderson soon formed a regular trio with Stirling Betancourt on timbales and a succession of double-bassists. He created a Caribbean-oriented atmosphere and instituted what became one of London's most popular jam sessions. He played solo piano on weekend evenings, and, for the next 35 years, The Coleherne was the focus for dozens of musicians in search of a jam - much to the delight of brewers Bass Charrington. The 1969 Guide to London Pubs described how The Coleherne 'really comes into its own as a musical pub on Sunday mornings, with the appearance of a dynamic West Indian band'. The rich rhythmic mix involved percussionists including Errol Phillip aka "Blocker", and double-bassists Brylo Ford, Irving Clement and David "Happy" Williams, followed by Clyde Davies, who soon switched to electric bass guitar.

International jazz figures such as Johnny Griffin, Walter Davis Jr. and Philly Joe Jones contributed to this most democratic of jam-sessions, while locals included Eric Allandale, Graham Bond, Dave DeFries, Malcolm Griffiths, Rannie Hart, Joe Harriott, Shake Keane, Mike Osborne, Terri Quaye, Ernest Ranglin, John Surman and Olaf Vass. In the 1970s, the virtuoso folk guitarist Davey Graham was a regular. Audiences included rock and pop musicians such as Eric Burdon, Georgie Fame and Mick Jagger, actors Norman Beaton, Ram John Holder, Danny "Pressure" Jackson, Horace James and Bari Jonson, poets Pete Brown and Michael Horovitz, publisher Peter Owen, and calypsonian Lord Kitchener.

In 1966, Henderson, Betancourt and Max Cherrie were recruited from The Coleherne to play steel-drums for the children's event organised by social worker Rhaune Laslett that evolved into the first Notting Hill Carnival.

In 1973, The Coleherne's Sunday sessions were the subject of a documentary for the BBC Two television programme Full House, directed by Horace Ové and transmitted on 3 February 1973.

=== Gay pub ===
The Coleherne became a gay pub in the mid-1950s. Originally it was segregated into two bars, one for the straight crowd and one for the gay community at a time when homosexuality was illegal. In the 1970s it became a notorious leather bar, with blacked-out windows, attracting an international crowd including Freddie Mercury, Kenny Everett, Anthony Perkins, Rupert Everett, Ian McKellen and Derek Jarman. Leather men wearing chaps and leather jackets with key chains and colour-coded handkerchiefs formed the clientele, justifying its nickname of 'The Cloneherne'. The Coleherne was known internationally as a leather bar by 1965. The gay community flourished in Earls Court and many international tourists joined the locals.

It sought to lighten its image with a makeover in the mid-1990s to attract a wider clientele, but to no avail. In September 2008, it was purchased by Realpubs, underwent a major refurbishment and reopened as a gastropub, The Pembroke. The Coleherne was reputed to be the oldest gay pub in London before reopening as the Pembroke; the title then fell to the King Edward VI in Islington, which closed in 2011; then the Queen's Head in Chelsea which closed in 2016. The Markham Arms at 138 King's Road, which closed in the early 1990s and is now a bank branch, was a gay pub on Saturdays only.

== Notable events ==
Coleherne pub-goers, angry at the politicisation of gay sex, lifestyle and position in society by the Gay Liberation Front (GLF), pelted passing parade-goers with bottles in 1972.

Over the years, many police arrests were made for a range of offences, including obstruction, soliciting, importuning, and the more serious conspiracy to corrupt public morals, in the street outside the pub at night when customers left at closing time. These arrests were often just as a result of little more than gay men standing in the street talking to each other—despite the fact that many other non-gay pubs in the area used to have similar crowds at closing time, with no police action taken against them. There were several local street disturbances and demonstrations in the 1970s and 1980s as a result of continual, decades-long police harassment around the Coleherne.

In its latter years the pub was infamous as having been the stalking ground for three separate serial killers from the 1970s to the 1990s: Dennis Nilsen, Michael Lupo and Colin Ireland. Ireland committed five murders in 1993, after making a New Year's resolution to become a serial killer. Although he later claimed to be straight, he picked up men at the Coleherne, whose colour-coded handkerchiefs indicated that they were into sadomasochism and passive. He accompanied his victims to their homes, where he restrained and then killed them.

== Popular culture ==
American author Armistead Maupin included references to the Coleherne in his Tales of the City book Babycakes.

He left as a clock was striking ten somewhere and walked several blocks past high-windowed brick buildings to a gay pub called the Coleherne. These were the leather boys, apparently. He ordered another gin and tonic and stood at the bulletin board reading announcements about Gay Tory meetings and 'jumble sales' to benefit deaf lesbians.

When he returned to the horseshoe-shaped bar, the man across from him smiled broadly. He was a kid really, not more than eighteen or nineteen, and his skin was the same shade as the dark ale he was drinking. His hair was the startling part - soft brown ringlets that glinted with gold under the light, floating above his mischievous eyes like ... well, like the froth on his ale.

The pub is referred to in the lyrics of "Hanging Around" on the debut album Rattus Norvegicus by The Stranglers.

I'm moving in the Coleherne

With the leather all around me

And the sweat is getting steamy

But their eyes are on the ground

They're just hanging around

The pub is the location of the main character's first visit to a gay bar/pub (set in 2002) in Paul Mendez' 2020 novel Rainbow Milk.

== See also ==
- List of LGBTQ bars
