= Rakhmanov =

Rakhmanov may refer to:

- Rakhmanov (surname), surname
- Rakhmanov Perevoz, a rural locality in Vladimir, Vladimir Oblast, Russia

== See also ==
- Rakhmaninov (disambiguation)
