= The Great Sebastian =

The Great Sebastian or Great Sebastian may refer to:

- A famous trapeze artist from the Ringling Bros. and Barnum & Bailey Circus, also portrayed in The Greatest Show on Earth film about the circus
- Tom the Great Sebastian, a sound system named after the trapeze artist
- Johann Sebastian Bach, a great composer and musician
