= London Free School =

Community action adult education project

The London Free School (LFS) was founded on 8 March 1966, principally by John "Hoppy" Hopkins and Rhaune Laslett.

== Description ==
The London Free School was a community action adult education project inspired by American free universities (and the Victorian Jewish Free School in Spitalfields). The organisers have been described as an "anarchic temporary coalition" of the old guard New Left and CND housing activists from the Rachman days and the new beatnik/hippie generation. The former included George Clark of the Notting Hill Community Workshop, Richard Hauser (who ran a community scheme after the 1958 riots), Rhaune and Jim Laslett-O’Brien, Bill Richardson of the Powis and Colville Residents Association, Andre and Barbara Shervington.

To varying degrees of involvement, the hippie contingent numbered John Hopkins, Michael X, Courtney Tulloch (IT), Lloyd Hunter, Peter Jenner (who was just starting to manage Pink Floyd), Joe Boyd of Elektra Records and UFO, Andrew King, Michael Horovitz, John Michell, Julie Felix, Jeff Nuttall, Mike McInnerney (Tommy artist), Graham Keen (IT), Neil Oram (The Warp), Dave Tomlin (IT), Felix de Mendelssohn (Children of Albion), Nigel Waymouth of Granny Takes a Trip, John Esam, Alexander Trocchi, the jazz writer Ron Atkins, the Warhol star Kate Heliczer, Harvey Matusow (the McCarthy witchtrials saboteur), R. D. Laing and "the Belsize Park shrinks", Emily Young, Anjelica Huston and Pink Floyd.

According to Jeff Nuttall, "Ultimately the Free School did nothing but put out a local underground newsletter and organise the 2 Notting Hill Gate Festivals, which were, admittedly, models of exactly how the arts should operate – festive, friendly, audacious, a little mad and all taking place on demolition sites, in the streets, and in a magnificently institutional church hall." Despite this opinion, the formation of the "Notting Hill Neighbourhood Service" (one of the first centres to offer drug and legal advice in London), the Notting Hill Carnival, the International Times and the UFO Club all emerged from the brief life of the LFS.

Also significant was the early development of Pink Floyd, who played at All Saints Church Hall, initially as part of the Notting Hill Fayre (Carnival), and then a series of fund-raising concerts for the LFS. These were among the earliest gigs by the band, coming between their Spontaneous Underground period at The Marquee and the start of the UFO Club.
