= John Hopkins (political activist) =

British activist and photographer (1937–2015)

John "Hoppy" Hopkins
- Born: John Victor Lindsay Hopkins; 15 August 1937; Slough, Berkshire, England
- Died: 30 January 2015 (aged 77)
- Education: Emmanuel College, Cambridge
- Occupations: Photographer, journalist, researcher and political activist
- Spouse: Susan Zeiger (m. 1968, divorced)
- Website: hoppyx.com

John Victor Lindsay "Hoppy" Hopkins (15 August 1937 – 30 January 2015) was a British photographer, journalist, researcher and political activist, and "one of the best-known underground figures of 'Swinging London' " in the late 1960s. He also co-founded the highly influential nightclub venue UFO.

== Life ==
Hopkins was born on 15 August 1937 in Slough, Berkshire, England.

After attending Felsted School in Essex, Hopkins went on to graduate in 1958 with a degree in physics and mathematics from Emmanuel College, Cambridge, which he had entered on a scholarship in 1955, and he began to work as a laboratory technician at the Atomic Energy Research Establishment at Harwell, Oxfordshire. When he took a trip to Moscow, Russia, to attend a Communist youth festival, his security clearance was revoked. Hopkins then re-located to London at the beginning of 1960, and began to work as a photographer for newspapers and music magazines including Jazz News, The Guardian, Melody Maker and Peace News. He photographed many of the leading musicians of the period, including The Beatles and the Rolling Stones. Hopkins also recorded the seedier side of London, with photographs of tattoo parlours, cafés, prostitutes and fetishists.

By the mid-1960s, he was at the centre of London's emerging underground scene and recorded many peace marches, poetry readings and "happenings", as well as photographing leading counter-cultural figures, including Allen Ginsberg and Malcolm X. Hopkins compiled and stencil-duplicated the names, contact details and interests of all of London's "movers and shakers". He then gave all of them a copy. This action is credited with greatly boosting the 1960s London-based underground movement.

In 1966, with Rhaune Laslett and others, he helped set up the London Free School in Notting Hill. This in turn led to the establishment of the Notting Hill carnival, first organised by Laslett with the guidance of local activists, including Michael X. As an extension of the Free School news-sheet The Gate, in 1966 Hopkins and Barry Miles co-founded the influential magazine International Times (IT). Hopkins also set up the UFO Club with Joe Boyd, with Pink Floyd as the resident band.

Arrested for cannabis possession, Hopkins elected for trial by jury. In court on 1 June 1967, he claimed that cannabis was harmless and that the law should be changed. The judge, describing Hopkins as "a pest to society", sentenced him to nine months in prison for keeping premises for the smoking of cannabis and possession of cannabis, although Hopkins served only six months. He was jailed at HM Prison Wormwood Scrubs. A "Free Hoppy" movement sprang up and, as one particular consequence, Stephen Abrams began co-ordinating a campaign for the liberalisation of the law on cannabis. This led to the publication in The Times on 24 July of a full-page advertisement that described the existing law as "immoral in principle and unworkable in practice", signed by Francis Crick, George Melly, Jonathan Miller and the Beatles. Paul McCartney, initially clandestinely, arranged the funding for this advertisement as a tribute to Hoppy, at the instigation of Barry Miles.

Hopkins remained a member of IT′s editorial board and a major contributor, and founded BIT as an information and agitprop arm. Hopkins favoured the more anarchistic elements in the "underground" centred on Ladbroke Grove, such as former UFO doorman Mick Farren, who by 1967 was also working at the IT newspaper.

In the 1970s, Hopkins was involved in researching the social uses of video for UNESCO, the Arts Council of Great Britain, the Home Office and others, and edited the Journal of the Centre for Advanced TV Studies. Later, he worked as a technical journalist in the video trade press, and co-authored distance learning video training courses. Subsequently, he took and exhibited macro photography of flowers and other plants, and co-authored papers on plant biochemistry at the University of Westminster. He also exhibited his photographs of events and personalities in the 1960s.

Hopkins died at the age of 77 on 30 January 2015.

== Publications ==
- "Long Hair Times", 1966
- International Times/IT Volume 1 – 1966–1973
- From the Hip: Photographs 1960–66, Damiani Editore, 2008
