= Laslett =

Laslett is an English surname, which originates from Nantwich in Cheshire, the family moved to Kent around 1546. The name appears in the 16th century parish register of Harbledown near Canterbury, spelt as Lawslet or Lauslet. Parish Registers there have the name Lanslett which is a probable source of Laslett, it is probable that the name Lanslett derives from the name 'Lancelot'.

Notable people with the surname include:

- Jason Laslett (born 1969), British field hockey player
- Peter Laslett (1915–2001), British historian
- Rhaune Laslett (1919–2002), British community organizer
- William Laslett (1799–1884), British politician
