= Leslie "Teacher" Palmer =

Trinidadian community activist, writer and teacher (born 1943)

Leslie Palmer MBE
- Born: Leslie Stephen Palmer; 21 August 1943 (age 83); Tunapuna, Trinidad
- Other names: Teacher; The Wounded Soldier
- Occupations: Community activist, writer, teacher, calypsonian
- Known for: Director of Notting Hill Carnival 1973–1975

Leslie Stephen "Teacher" Palmer, MBE (born 21 August 1943), is a Trinidadian community activist, writer and teacher, who migrated in the 1960s to the UK, where he became involved in music and the arts in West London. He is credited with developing a successful template for the Notting Hill Carnival, of which he was director from 1973 to 1975, during which time he "completely revolutionised the event and transformed its structure and content almost beyond recognition." He is also known by the name of "The Wounded Soldier" as a kaisonian.

== Background ==
Born in Tunapuna, Trinidad, on 21 August 1943, Leslie Palmer migrated to England in 1964 at the age of 21. At first he settled in the Kensal Rise area of London, and helped to form the Blue Notes Steel Orchestra in Ladbroke Grove. He trained as a teacher in Liverpool (thereafter acquiring the nickname by which he became affectionately known).

=== Involvement with Notting Hill Carnival ===
Palmer participated in the annual Notting Hill Carnival street festivities since its inaugural event in 1966, and had also been back to Trinidad to study the organisation and artistic forms of the carnival tradition there. He had been thinking of how the London event could be improved, by broadening it to make it more inclusive of all the Caribbean islands as well as of British-born black youth, and he was given the opportunity to begin implementing his plans after taking on the role of carnival organiser in 1973. Anthony Perry, former director of the North Kensington Amenity Trust, who provided Palmer with premises from which to operate at 3 Acklam Road, has said: "I don’t think there was a Notting Hill Carnival as the world knows it until 1973 when Leslie Palmer really put some juice into it and turned it into an all-island event". In the words of Tom Vague: "Under the administration of Leslie Palmer, the Notting Hill Peoples Carnival was transformed into an urban festival of black music, incorporating all aspects of Trinidad’s Carnival... getting sponsorship, recruiting more steel bands, reggae groups and sound systems, introducing generators and extending the route. The attendance went up accordingly from 3,000 at the beginning of the 70's to 30–50,000."

Palmer encouraged traditional masquerade, and for the first time in 1973 costume bands and steel bands from the various islands took part in the street parade, alongside the introduction of stationary sound systems, as distinct from those on moving floats, which as Alex Pascall has explained: "created the bridge between the two cultures of carnival, reggae and calypso." According to Claire Holder (Carnival organiser 1989–2002):

"Leslie Palmer brought the Caribbean community together because at the time when he became chairman of the carnival it was a purely Trinidadian thing. Leslie said, ‘there are so many aspects to Caribbean culture and it should all be represented.’ That act alone didn't just bring people into carnival; it actually impacted on our whole perception as Carnival people. His impact went beyond Carnival. It had an impact upon our existence as black people in this country."

Palmer also arranged for photographs from the Carnival to be exhibited at London's Institute of Contemporary Arts.

=== 1975 onwards ===
In late 1975, he took up a job working for Chris Blackwell's Island Records, promoting reggae worldwide and travelling with artists including Toots and the Maytals. Palmer went on to start his own management agency, representing young British acts such as Aswad, Steel Pulse, Janet Kay and Alton Ellis. Then with assistance from the Ministry of Labour he founded the Brent Black Music Co-op (BBMC) to mentor young musicians on getting ahead in the music industry, with Geraldine Connor as head of education. In the 1980s he had his own music career as an artist, performing and recording under the name Wounded Soldier.

He subsequently returned to teaching, retiring in 1996, after which he began to divide his time between London and the Caribbean. From his base in Bon Accord, Tobago, he wrote about the island for visitors, producing a popular magazine and a website, What's On ... in Tobago, and eventually compiling eight years of this work into a book entitled Tobago Exposed – The Essential Fun Guide.

Palmer was founding director and creative director of the annual Notting Hill Carnival Pioneers (NHCP) Community Festival, established "to honour the efforts of his predecessors who ensured the survival and flourishing of diverse art forms". The festival's first event was held in 2013, and festivals continued to be held through 2023. The festival was initially held at Portobello Green before relocating to Emslie Horniman's Pleasance, Kensal Road, after outgrowing the original venue.

== Recognition and awards ==
On 24 August 2012, as part of a Notting Hill Carnival Weekend tribute, the Nubian Jak Community Trust organised the unveiling of two blue plaques at the junction of Tavistock Road known as "Carnival Square", to honour the contributions to the development of Carnival by steelpan musician Russell Henderson and Leslie Palmer. The plaque to Palmer states that he "Pioneered the template for the modern Notting Hill Carnival, Helped transform a local community carnival into a nationally recognised event." Palmer remains the only living recipient so honoured.

His 70th birthday, coinciding with the 40th anniversary of "Carnival '73 Mas in the Ghetto", was celebrated on Portobello Green before the 2013 Carnival.

His contributions are detailed in the 2014 book Carnival: A Photographic and Testimonial History of the Notting Hill Carnival, which, as Kunle Olulode states in his review, "gives credit to many of the unsung heroes that brought the event together and provides a political and social context on its early days", noting that Palmer in his tenure as administrator of the Carnival "decided to expand its appeal by involving all the regional Caribbean communities.... Palmer's other innovation was encourage more masquerade elements which drew on the skills of Trinidad costume design legends Peter Minshall and Lawrence Noel."

Leslie Palmer makes a cameo appearance at the end of "We the Generation", the single featuring Mahalia from Rudimental's 2015 album of the same name.

In the 2017 New Year's Honours List, Palmer was honoured as a Member of the Order of the British Empire (MBE) "for services to Performance and the community in London".
