= Hedley Jones =

Hedley H. G. Jones OD (12 November 1917 – 1 September 2017) was a Jamaican musician, audio engineer, inventor, trade unionist and writer. He designed and played one of the first solid-bodied electric guitars, designed and built Jamaica's first sound systems and traffic lights, and in 2011 was awarded the Musgrave Gold Medal for distinguished eminence in the field of music.

== Biography ==
He was born near Linstead, Jamaica, the son of David and Hettie Jones, and started making music as a child. He made his own cello at the age of 14, as well as a banjo. In 1935 he moved to Kingston, where he heard Marcus Garvey speak, and worked as a tailor, cabinet maker, bus conductor, repairing sewing machines, radios and gramophones. He said: "I was what people called a jack of all trades. I could fix everything." His main work was as a proofreader, with the Gleaner and Jamaica Times.

He also played banjo in a Hawaiian jazz band, before forming his own Hedley Jones Sextet. Inspired by the recordings of Charlie Christian, but unable to afford an imported guitar, he built himself a solid-bodied electric guitar and was featured with it on the front page of The Gleaner in September 1940, at about the same time that Les Paul was doing similar pioneering work in the US. Jones continued to build guitars for other Jamaican musicians in the years that followed.

In 1943 he joined the British Royal Air Force, trained as a radar engineer at the Royal Technical College in Glasgow, and served in Europe during World War II, returning to Jamaica in 1946. He started a radio servicing business in Kingston and imported jazz records from the US. He began making amplifiers in the late 1940s, and played jazz and Cuban records through them at his record store, Bop City. Jones built powerful amplifiers, with the technologically advanced capacity to distinguish and enhance treble, mid-range, and bass frequencies. He later wrote:

"The public address system prior to World War II was designed to electronically respond to a limited range of audio frequencies, covering voice and general purposes. As against such limitation, a Jamaican sound system was designed to respond with low surface noise, low distortion, and high fidelity, over the complete audio range of frequencies from 15 Hz to 20 kHz: a huge technological difference. The Jones model High-Fidelity audio amplifier of 1947 was designed to perform the function of reproduction of the full audio spectrum; and that was the model Tom Wong acquired and named a Sound System. Before that era noisy PA systems were the norm."

He then helped build an early sound system for hardware store owner and DJ Tom Wong, known as Tom the Great Sebastian. After Wong's success in establishing the popularity of dance parties, Jones built sound systems for rival DJs, including Arthur "Duke" Reid, whose Trojan sound system became the most popular, and Clement "Sir Coxsone" Dodd. In 1963, Dodd commissioned Jones to build the equipment for his Studio One recording studios in Kingston. Jones was described as "probably Jamaica's most important pioneer of sound system electronics".

With his cousin Stephen, Jones also built and demonstrated Jamaica's first traffic lights in 1952, following the devastation caused by Hurricane Charlie. Between 1959 and 1964 he was an instructor at Kingston Technical High School. He also achieved eminence as an astronomer, grinding his own lenses and building several telescopes, and received a Certificate of Merit from the Jamaica Cultural Development Commission in 1987 for his work in astronomy.

Jones moved to Montego Bay in 1965 to work as a bandleader in tourist resorts. He became an active member of the local musicians' union, which eventually led in 1985 to him becoming president, for ten years, of the Jamaica Federation of Musicians, receiving awards for meritorious service on his retirement. He also began writing a regular column for the Montego Bay newspaper, The Western Mirror, which he still continued in 2012, as Jamaica's oldest columnist.

In 1996, the Jamaica Government awarded him the Order of Distinction in Music. In 2011, at the age of 94, he received the Gold Musgrave Medal for distinguished eminence in the field of music.

In January 2014 it was announced that he would receive a Lifetime Achievement Award from the Jamaica Reggae Industry Association (JaRIA) the following month.

He married Norma in 1943; they had six sons and three daughters. He died in Montego Bay on 1 September 2017, at age 99.
