= Quaker City (sound system) =

English ska & reggae band (1964-)

Quaker City is a sound system based in Handsworth in Birmingham, England, playing as far afield as London, Bristol, Manchester and Leeds.

It was founded in 1964 by Karl Irving, who was born in Montego Bay, Jamaica, but emigrated to Birmingham. Originally playing ska, it later focused on reggae. Other band members included Bongo Star.

Quaker City competed at for the Gold Cup at Digbeth Civic Hall in 1979. They performed at the Showcase Revival Clash at Summerfield Community Centre in Birmingham in 1993.
