= Rachman =

Rachman is a surname. Notable people with the surname include:

- Abdul Rachman (born 1988), Indonesian professional footballer
- Arsyadjuliandi Rachman (born 1960), Indonesian politician
- Budhy Munawar-Rachman (born 1963), Indonesian progressive Islamic scholar
- Derry Rachman (born 1994), Indonesian professional footballer
- Gideon Rachman (born 1963), British journalist
- Muhammad Rachman (born 1971), Indonesian professional boxer
- Paul Rachman (born 1962), American film director
- Peter Rachman (1919–1962), London property owner whose name became a synonym for exploitative landlords ("Rachmanism")
- Stanley Rachman (1934–2021), South African-born Canadian psychologist
- Tom Rachman (born 1974), English-Canadian novelist

== See also ==
- Rahman (disambiguation)
- Rakhmaninov (disambiguation)
- Rakhmanov (surname)
