= Sterling Betancourt =

Trinidadian steelpan music arranger and musician (1930–2026)

Sterling Betancourt MBE
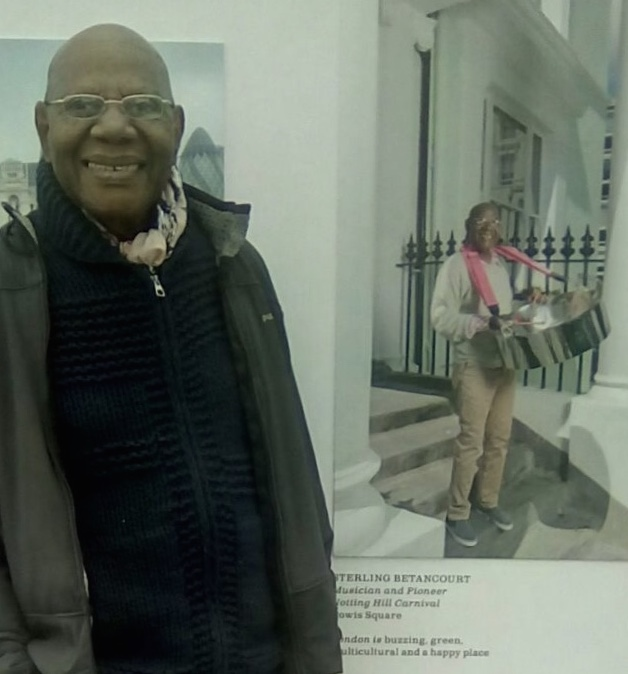
- 2016 I am London exhibition

Background information
- Born: 30 March 1930; Laventille, near Port of Spain, Trinidad and Tobago
- Died: 3 June 2026 (aged 96)
- Occupations: Pioneer; inventor; musician
- Instrument: Steelpan

Sterling Betancourt (30 March 1930 – 3 June 2026) was a Trinidadian-born pioneer, arranger and musician on the steelpan, and a major figure in pioneering the steelpan in Europe and the UK. He was a member of the Trinidad All-Steel Percussion Orchestra (TASPO) that played in London at the 1951 Festival of Britain.

In a career spanning more than five decades, he received numerous awards including his involvement in the origins of the Notting Hill Carnival in the 1960s. Betancourt lived in London, England.

== Early years ==
Betancourt (Trinidad pronunciation: Betancou) was born and raised in Laventille, near Port of Spain, in Trinidad. His father, Edwin, was a musician and a man of all trades, his mother Stella Bowen was a seamstress and a cleaner. At a very early age, Betancourt was involved with music with the Tambo Bambo family band and grew up experimenting with the steelpan, becoming a member of the Tripoli Steel band and Cross Fire. He began his career in the 1930s and became a steelpan tuner and eventually the leader of Crossfire, a steelband from the St James area. He also played a large part in the development of steelpan in Trinidad and Europe.

== Move to Europe ==
Betancourt was chosen with 11 steelpan players to form the Trinidad All-Steel Pan Percussion Orchestra (TASPO) and play in London at the 1951 Festival of Britain, in the same year he toured England and Europe with the band and was the only member of TASPO to remain in England when the others returned to Trinidad on 12 November 1951.

His calypso "Taspo's Story" featured on the RASPO Rhythms CD by the Reading All Steel Percussion Orchestra (RASPO), relates the tribulations encountered by the arrival of the first Steel Band in London: The Trinidad All Steel Percussion Orchestra (TASPO).

Betancourt, Russell Henderson and Mervyn Constantine, who later on was replaced by Max Cherrie, followed by his brother Ralph Cherrie, formed the first steelband in the UK and performed all over London as well as in radio shows, jazz clubs and the BBC.

In 1955, Betancourt was taught by Tony Kinsey to play the traps drums to form The Henderson combo.

=== Notting Hill Carnival ===
Henderson, Betancourt and Ralph Cherrie, initiated the multicultural Notting Hill children street festival organised by Rhaune Laslett in 1964. A festival that grew to become the biggest street event in Europe, the Notting Hill Carnival.

=== Other activities ===
Betancourt took steelpan to many other countries throughout Europe and Asia, including Switzerland, Hong Kong, Bahrain, Dubai, Abu Dhabi, Qatar, Morocco, Indonesia, Germany, Spain, France, Oman, Italy, Sicily, Sweden and Norway.

A 1976 performance he gave in a hotel in Zurich, Switzerland, inspired some locals to form their own Swiss group, which they called Tropefieber ("Tropical Fever"), the first steel band in Zurich, followed then by many others.

=== Nostalgia steel band ===
In 1985 Betancourt's steel band, "Nostalgia", was born and continued with him as the leader, player, and arranger until 2005.

Later years

In 2025, Betancourt was commissioned to write a new arrangement on his TASPO Story composition, to be performed at the Southbank Centre 75 years after his 1951 on the South Bank for the Festival of Britain. To be performed posthumously in July 2026 as part of a steel pan festival on the South Bank, the work is written for a specially commissioned festival band of steel pan performers.

== Death ==
Betancourt died on 3 June 2026, at the age of 96.

== Awards ==
Honours and awards that Betancourt received included: in 1993 Trinidad and Tobago’s Scarlet Ibis award. A University of East London Honorary Fellowship in 1996, a membership of the FRSA for his commitment in promoting steelpan culture throughout the United Kingdom, and pioneering steelpan projects in English schools and in the same year, the New York Sunshine Award.

Betancourt was appointed a Member of the Most Excellent Order of the British Empire (MBE) in the New Year Honours 2002 "for services to the steel band movement". In 2004 he received a Fellowship of the Royal Society, in 2006 a Pantrinbago Pioneer award, in 2010 Pan Jazz Life Time Achievement, 2011 Pan Trinbago Commemorative Plaque for Life Time Achievement.

In 2012, on the occasion of the Trinidad and Tobago Independence Jubilee celebrations, he was a recipient of one of the Arts awards recognising citizens who made a positive contribution to the promotion and development of Trinidad and Tobago in the United Kingdom during the past 50 years, given at a gala dinner in London hosted by High Commissioner Garvin Nicholas.

In February 2018, Sterling Betancourt recorded his latest calypso, "Brexit Bacchanal Story", with Dik Cadbury singer/guitar/bass guitar/violin, Tamla Batra on steelpan and piano and Betancourt on steel drum and percussion.
