= National Panorama Competition (UK) =

Steel band competition

The UK National Panorama Competition, a Saturday evening event that immediately precedes the Notting Hill Carnival, is a major showcase for Trinidad and Tobago Steel Pan, or (Steel Band), music. Held at Emslie Horniman's Pleasance park in the London Borough of Kensington and Chelsea, it typically involves approximately 1,000 performers, and attracts almost 5,000 spectators. Steel bands from around the UK prepare a music performance, arranged to last for up to 10 minutes, and compete for the Panorama Championship.

The UK National Panorama Competition was first held in 1978.

Ebony Steel Band has dominated this competition over the years, winning 25 times, followed by Mangrove Steel Band with 13 titles, as of 2026.

From 2007 to 2009, the event was held at London's Hyde Park, and broadcast by BBC radio.

== Results ==
=== 2011 ===
Band	Tune	Arranger	Position	Points
Mangrove Steel Band	"Is ah Trini"	Andre White	1st	275
Ebony Steel Band	"It's Showtime"	Earl Brooks	2nd	274
Caribbean Steel International	"Pan in De Panyard"	Brent Holder	3rd	267
Croydon Steel Orchestra	"Do Something For Pan"	Paul Dowie	4th	251
London All Stars	"Momentum"	Frank Rollock	5th	244
Reading All Steel Percussion Orchestra	"Calling Meh"	Iman Pascall	6th	229

=== 2016 ===
Band	Tune	Composer	Arranger	Position	Points
Ebony Steel Band	"Cheers to Life"	Aaron “Voice” St Louis	Duvone Stewart	1st	278
Mangrove Steel Band	"Different Me"	5 Star Akil	André White	2nd	270
Metronomes	"Different Me"	5 Star Akil	Annise "Halfers" Hadeed	3rd	266
Real Steel	"Nostalgia"	Anslem Douglas	Leroy Clarke	4th	260
Endurance Steel Orchestra	"Different Me"	5 Star Akil	Marlon Hibbert	5th	257.5
London All Stars	"Soca Ruption"	Simeon Superville	Phil "DBL" Rollock	6th	250
Croydon Steel Orchestra	"Different Me"	5 Star Akil	David "Soj" Ijaduola	7th	239
Caribbean Steel International	"Pan By Storm"	Designer	Brent Holder	8th	238

=== 2017 ===
Band	Tune	Composer	Arranger	Position	Points
Ebony Steel Band	"Far From Finished"	Voice	Duvone Stewart	1st	283
Metronomes	"Full Extreme"	Ultimate Rejects	Leroy Clarke	2nd	269
Mangrove Steel Band	"Full Extreme"	Ultimate Rejects	André White	3rd	266
Southside Harmonics	"Rumble in the Jungle"	Chuck Gordon	Eustace Benjamin	4th	237
Croydon Steel Orchestra	"Good Morning"	Peter Ram	Brent Holder	5th	227
Endurance Steel Orchestra	"Good Morning"	Peter Ram	Marlon Hibbert	5th	227
Phase One Steel Orchestra	"Hold Dat Panstick"	Sheldon "Mocha" Martin	Stephon Phillip	5th	227

=== 2018 ===
Band	Tune	Composer	Arranger	Position	Points
Mangrove Steel Band	"Hulk"	Blaxx	André White	1st	279
Ebony Steel Band	"Hulk"	Blaxx	Duvone Stewart	2nd	276
Metronomes	"Ignorance"	King Crazy	Leroy Clarke	3rd	269
Croydon Steel Orchestra	"Sweet Fuh Days"	Patrice Roberts	Paul Dowie	4th	238
Reading All Steel Percussion Orchestra	"Mad Man"	Marlon Abner	Paul Jr Watson & Dani Richardson	4th	238
Phase One Steel Orchestra	"Hulk"	Blaxx	Stephon Phillip	5th	229

=== 2019 ===
Band	Tune	Composer	Arranger	Position	Points
Mangrove Steel Band	"Savannah Grass"	KES	André White	1st	284
Metronomes	"So Long"	Nadia Baston	Leroy Clarke	2nd	270
Ebony Steel Band	"Trouble In The Morning"	V'ghn	Duvone Stewart	3rd	269
Pan Nation Steel Orchestra	"Iron Love"	Nailah Blackman	Chris Storey	4th	263
Croydon Steel Orchestra	"Savannah Grass"	KES	Paul Dowie	5th	245
Phase One Steel Orchestra	"Savannah Grass"	KES	Stephon Phillip	6th	237

=== 2020 ===
Due to the Covid-19 pandemic, Panorama did not take place in 2020.

=== 2021 ===
Band	Tune	Composer	Arranger	Position	Points
Mangrove Steel Band	"Happy Place"	Lyrikal	André White	1st	271.5
Ebony Steel Band	"Backyard Jam"	Farmer Nappy	David “Soj” Ijaduola	2nd	255
Metronomes	"Backyard Jam"	Farmer Nappy	Vivian Miller	2nd	255
Croydon Steel Orchestra	"Festival Song"	Ella Andall	Paul Dowie	4th	247

=== 2022 ===
Band	Tune	Composer	Arranger	Position	Points
Ebony Steel Band	"Mash Up"	Blaxx	Duvone Stewart	1st	277
Mangrove Steel Band	"Mash Up"	Blaxx	André White	2nd	276
Pan Nation Steel Orchestra	"Out and Bad"	Aaron “Voice” St Louis	Chris Storey	3rd	255
Metronomes	"Out and Bad"	Aaron “Voice” St Louis	Vivian Miller	4th	252
Croydon Steel Orchestra	"Jelly"	Nadia Baston	Paul Dowie	5th	225

=== 2023 ===
Band	Tune	Composer	Arranger	Position	Points
Ebony Steel Band	"Engine Room"	Olatunji	Duvone Stewart	1st	278
Mangrove Steel Band	"Long Live Soca"	Aaron “Voice” St Louis	André White	2nd	276
Pan Nation Steel Orchestra	"This Melody Sweet"	Baron	Chris Storey	3rd	261
Real Steel	"Long Live Soca"	Aaron “Voice” St Louis	Leroy Clarke	4th	255
Croydon Steel Orchestra	"Raising Dust"	Johnny Douglas	Rashaun Myers Williams	5th	242
Metronomes	"Engine Room"	Olatunji	Vivian Miller	6th	240
Southside Harmonics	"Engine Room"	Olatunji	Eustace Benjamin	7th	232

=== 2024 ===
Band	Tune	Composer	Arranger	Position	Points
Mangrove Steel Band	'How Ah Livin''	Farmer Nappy	André White	1st	--
Ebony Steel Band	'How Ah Livin''	Farmer Nappy	Duvone Stewart	2nd	--
Real Steel	"Pan in Danger"	Merchant	Leroy Clarke	3rd	--
Metronomes	"Inventor"	Olatunji	Vivian Miller	4th	--
Croydon Steel Orchestra	"DNA"	Mical Teja	Marlon Hibbert	5th	--

=== 2025 ===
==== Large Band Panorama ====
Band	Tune	Composer	Arranger	Position	Points
Mangrove Steel Band	"Cocoa Tea"	Kes the Band	André White	1st	370
Real Steel	"Cocoa Tea"	Kes the Band	Leroy Clarke	2nd	364
Metronomes	"Bet Meh"	Machel Montano	Terrance “BJ” Marcelle	3rd	361
Pan Nation Steel Orchestra	"Mas Go Play"	Erphaan Alves	Chris Storey	4th	355

==== Small Band Panorama ====
Band	Tune	Composer	Arranger	Position	Points
New Generation Steel Orchestea	"Too Own Way"	Aaron "Voice" St Louis	Lushan Dennis	1st	328.5
Eclipse Steel Orchestra	"Too Own Way"	Aaron "Voice" St Louis	David "Soj" Ijaduola	2nd	324.5
North Tyneside Steel Band	"Take Me Home"	Freetown Collective	Jenny Gilberg & Matthew Wade	3rd	319

==== Junior Panorama ====
Band	Tune	Composer	Arranger	Position	Points
Ebony Steel Band Juniors	"Too Own Way"	Aaron "Voice" St Louis	Carlene 'Sweet Wrists' Etienne	1st	348
Endurance Steel Orchestra	"Too Own Way"	Aaron "Voice" St Louis	Marlon Hibbert	2nd	
Mangrove Youth	"Too Own Way"	Aaron "Voice" St Louis	Kishan Shorter	3rd	333
Croydon Steel Orchestra	"Too Own Way"	Aaron "Voice" St Louis	Jadeel Kato Lilith	4th	

2026

Band	Tune	Composer	Arranger	Position	Points
Ebony Steel Band	Cyah Behave	Aaron "Voice" St Louis	Ojay Richards	1st	287
Mangrove Steel Band	One for the Team	Full Blown x Tano	André White	2nd	281
Metronomes	Respectfully Yours	Full Blown	Terrance ‘BJ’ Marcelle	3rd	271
Real Steel	Rant & Rave	Christopher ‘Tambu’ Herbert	Leroy Clarke	4th	270
Southside Harmonics	Jam Town	Coutain x Tano	Eustace Benjamin	5th	250
