= Dubplate =

Acetate recording disc

10" dubplates

A dubplate is an acetate disc usually 10 inches (25 cm) in diameter, traditionally used by studios to test recordings prior to mastering for the subsequent pressing of a vinyl record, but pioneered by reggae sound systems as a way to play exclusive music. They became an important facet of the jungle/drum and bass, UK garage, grime and dubstep music scenes.

== History ==
Dubplate cutting at a cutting house

According to David Toop, the "dub" in dubplate is an allusion to the dubplate's use in "dubbing" or "doubling" the original version of a track. The first use of dubplates is commonly attributed to sound engineer King Tubby and reggae sound systems such as Lloyd Coxsone and Killamanjaro. Special and one-off versions were cut to acetate for competing in a sound clash, using vocals specially recorded to namecheck the sound system. As such, these became known as "dubplate specials" often remarking on the prowess of the sound system playing it, in a bid to win the clash.

In the UK, John Hassell and his wife ran a recording studio from their suburban house in Barnes, South West London, which became key to British sound systems and artists such as Dennis Bovell. Throughout the 1980s and 1990s, Music House in North London and JTS Studio in East London were the two most prominent "cutting houses".

Whilst acetates have been used in the music industry for many years, especially in dance music, dubplates became a particularly important part of the jungle/drum and bass scene throughout the 1990s. This was followed by the UK garage, grime and dubstep genres, and cutting houses such as Transition. New music was composed and recorded onto DAT tape to be cut onto dubplate, often so that it could be played that weekend (or even that night).

Despite the shift to DJing on digital mediums such as CDJs and DJ controllers, dubplates continue to be used for playing exclusive music and have also gained a specialist market in recent years.

== See also ==
- Acetate disc
- Reggae sound system
