= Rakhmanov Perevoz =

Rakhmanov Perevoz Рахманов Перевоз
- Settlement
- Location within Vladimir Oblast Location within Russia
- Coordinates: 56°08′N 40°29′E
- Country: Russia
- Region: Vladimir Oblast
- District: Vladimir
- Time zone: UTC+3:00

Rakhmanov Perevoz (Russian: Рахманов Перевоз) is a rural locality (a settlement) in Vladimir, Vladimir Oblast, Russia. The population was 49 as of 2010. There is 1 street.

== Geography ==
Rakhmanov Perevoz is located 12 km east of Vladimir. Ladoga is the nearest rural locality.
