= Notting Hill Carnival =

Annual street festival in London

Coordinates: 51.5132°N 0.2043°W

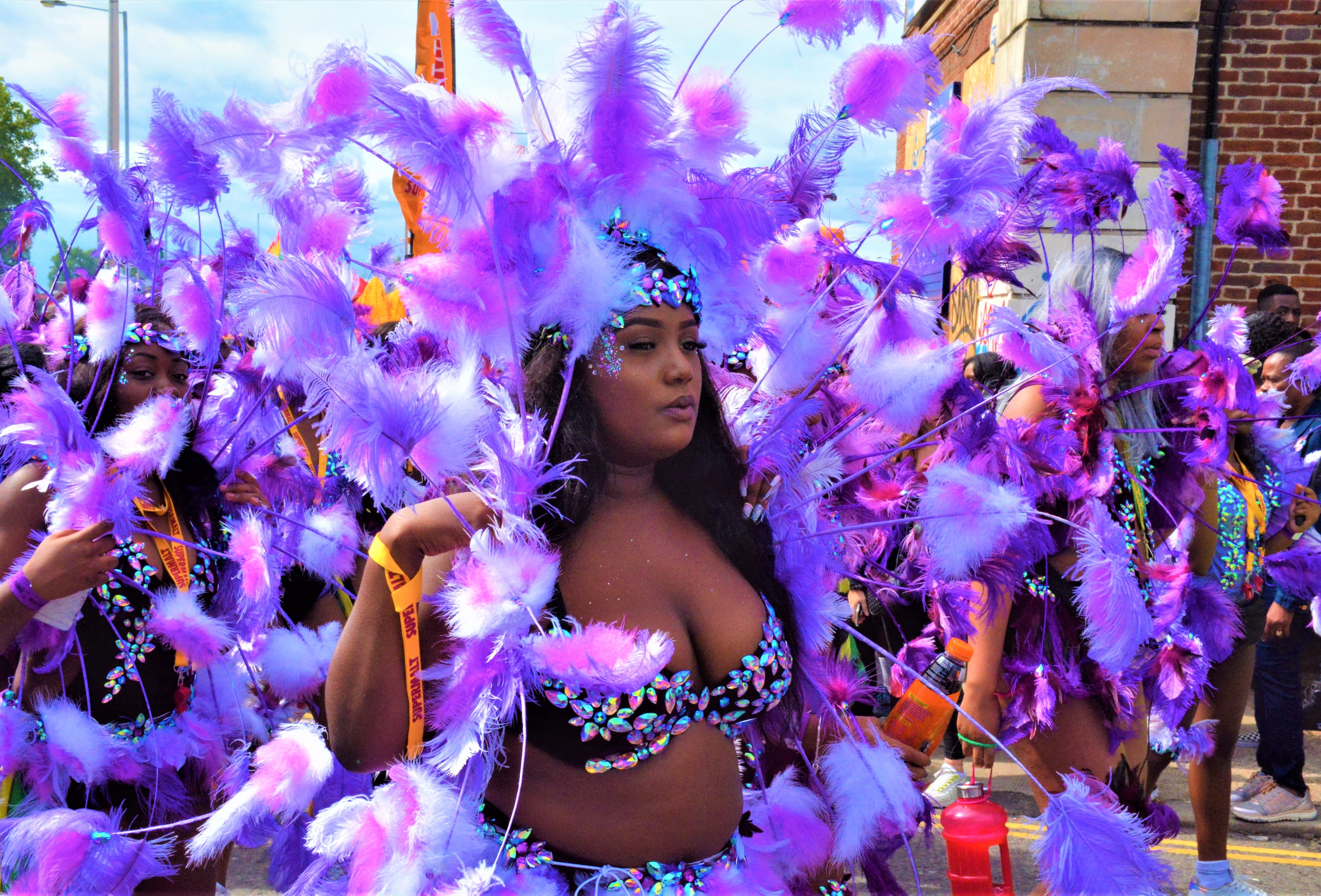
- Mas dancer, Notting Hill Carnival 2018
- Genre: Carnival
- Frequency: Annually – August Bank Holiday weekend
- Locations: Ladbroke Grove, London, England
- Years active: 1966–present
- Founders: Claudia Jones, Rhaune Laslett, Leslie Palmer, Sam King, Russell Henderson, Duke Vin
- Most recent: 29 August 2026 – 31 August 2026
- Next event: 28 August 2027 – 30 August 2027
- Attendance: 2 million attendees, 40,000 volunteers and 9,000 police
- Website: nhcarnival.org

The Notting Hill Carnival is an annual Caribbean Carnival event that has taken place in London, UK since 1966 on the streets of the Notting Hill area of Kensington, over the August Bank Holiday weekend.

It is led by members of the British Caribbean community, and attracts around two million people annually, making it one of the world's largest street festivals, the largest in Europe, and a significant event in British African Caribbean and British Indo-Caribbean culture. In 2006, the UK public voted the Notting Hill Carnival onto a list of icons of England.

Carnival traditionally commences on the Saturday with Panorama, a competition between steelpan bands. Sunday is designated family and children's day, with a shorter parade route for young people. The main adult parade takes place on Monday. Notting Hill Carnival represents the "five disciplines of carnival": masquerade, calypso, soca, steelpan, and sound systems.

== History ==
The origin of Notting Hill Carnival can be traced to a number of roots.

A "Caribbean Carnival" was held on 30 January 1959 in St Pancras Town Hall as a response to the problematic state of race relations at the time; the UK's first widespread racial attacks, the Notting Hill race riots in which 108 people were charged, had occurred the previous year. This was organised by the Trinidadian journalist and activist Claudia Jones, often described as "the mother of the Notting Hill Carnival" in her capacity as editor of the newspaper The West Indian Gazette, and directed by Edric Connor. It showcased elements of a Caribbean carnival in a cabaret style. It featured the Mighty Terror singing the calypso "Carnival at St Pancras", The Southlanders, Cleo Laine, the Trinidad All Stars and Hi–fi steel bands dance troupe, finishing with a Caribbean Carnival Queen beauty contest and a Grand Finale Jump-Up by West Indians who attended the event.

The first outside event in Notting Hill was in August 1966, a hippie London Free School-inspired festival organised by Rhaune Laslett, who was not aware of the indoor events when she first raised the idea. This festival was a more diverse Notting Hill event to promote cultural unity. A street party for neighbourhood children turned into a carnival procession when Russell Henderson's steel band (who had played at the earlier Claudia Jones events) went on a walkabout. By 1970 "the Notting Hill Carnival consisted of 2 music bands, the Russell Henderson Combo and Selwyn Baptiste's Notting Hill Adventure Playground Steelband and 500 dancing spectators."

Leslie "Teacher" Palmer, who was director from 1973 to 1975, is credited with "getting sponsorship, recruiting more steel bands, reggae groups and sound systems, introducing generators and extending the route." He encouraged traditional masquerade, and for the first time in 1973 costume bands and steel bands from the various islands took part in the street parade, alongside the introduction of stationary sound systems, as distinct from those on moving floats, which, as Alex Pascall has explained, "created the bridge between the two cultures of carnival, reggae and calypso." "Notting Hill Carnival became a major festival in 1975 when it was organised by a young teacher, Leslie Palmer." The carnival was also popularised by live radio broadcasts by Pascall on his daily Black Londoners programme for BBC Radio London.

Sam King is described in tributes as a co-founder and early organiser of the Notting Hill Carnival, having helped establish a Caribbean street festival in 1964 that later developed into the modern carnival. In addition to his role in the carnival’s early years, King was a prominent community activist of the Windrush generation and later became the first Black mayor of Southwark.

Russell Henderson was a piano and steelpan jazz musician, whose steelband played at the "Caribbean Carnival" organised at St Pancras Town Hall. He is widely recognised as one of the founding figures of the Carnival. With Henderson was also Sterling Betancourt, steelpan arranger and musician.

Duke Vin (Vincent George Forbes) is credited as having brought the first sound system to the United Kingdom in 1955 when he was a stowaway on a ship from Jamaica to the United Kingdom, and what is thought to be the first sound system to the Notting Hill Carnival in 1973, which paved the way for the many sound systems that operate at the carnival today. Duke Vin became a legend in Ladbroke Grove and had a huge influence on the popularisation of reggae and ska in Britain. He played at Notting Hill Carnival with his sound system, "Duke Vin the Tickler's", every year until his death in 2012.

Emslie Horniman's Pleasance (in the Kensal Green district of the area), has been the carnival's traditional starting point. Among the early bands to participate were Ebony Steelband and Metronomes Steelband. As the carnival had no permanent staff or head office, the Mangrove restaurant in Notting Hill, run by another Trinidadian, Frank Crichlow, came to function as an informal communication hub and office address for the carnival's organisers.

The 1976 carnival was marred by riots. There was considerable press coverage of the disorder, which some felt took an unfairly negative and one-sided view of the carnival. There were calls from politicians and the press for the event to be banned or relocated. Prince Charles was one of the few establishment figures who supported the event. Leila Hassan campaigned for Arts Council England to recognise the Notting Hill Carnival as an art form.

Since 1978 the national Panorama competition is held on the Saturday preceding the carnival.

Concerns about the size of the event led to London mayor Ken Livingstone setting up a Carnival Review Group in 2000 to look into "formulating guidelines to safeguard the future of the Carnival". An interim report by the review led to a change to the route in 2002. When the full report was published in 2004, it recommended that Hyde Park be used as a "savannah" (an open space to draw crowds away from residential areas), though the proposal of such a move attracted concerns, including that the Hyde Park event might overshadow the original street carnival.

In 2003 the Notting Hill Carnival was run by a limited company, the Notting Hill Carnival Trust Ltd. A report by the London Development Agency on the 2002 Carnival estimated that the event contributed around £93 million to the London and UK economy.

The Mayor of London's Carnival Review Group's report, published in 2004, led to the parades taking a circular rather than linear route, but a recommendation to relocate the event in Hyde Park was resisted.

In 2015 there was controversy when the Carnival Trust charged journalists £100 to cover the event, and demanded copies of all work produced relating to the event within three weeks of the end of the Carnival. The National Union of Journalists organised a boycott of the event. In 2016 the charge remained, but in June 2017 the Carnival's new event management team introduced a revised media policy, with no requirement for accreditation fees.

On both days at the 2017 carnival, a minute's silence was observed in tribute to the victims of the Grenfell Tower fire, with many carnival-goers wearing "green for Grenfell".

The 2020 carnival was cancelled due to the ongoing COVID-19 pandemic, although free live-streamed events were shown online across four channels; the 2021 Carnival was also cancelled.

Carnival resumed in 2022, starting with a run, and with a 72-second silence to remember the 72 victims of the 2017 Grenfell Tower fire.

In March 2026, the Mayor of London announced £5 million in funding for the 2026 carnival, with a focus on managing overcrowding.

The 2026 carnival celebrated its 60th anniversary.

== Culture of the carnival ==
This huge street festival attracting about two million people every year to Notting Hill and highlights Caribbean and Black diasporic cultures. Carnival uses influences from many other festivals around the world. Authors Julian Henriques and Beatrice Ferrara claim the festival draws mainly on the Trinidad Carnival as well as Crop Over, Canadian Caribana in Toronto and the US Labor Day Festival in Brooklyn. They also explain that Notting Hill Carnival is dually influenced by its diasporic cultures and its own country's influences. Henriques and Ferrara claim: "Carnival also has an explosive auditory impact due to its cacophony of sounds, in which soca, steel bands, calypso floats and sound systems mix and mingle in a multi-media and multi-sensory event" (Ferrara 132).

This mixture of percussion, with emphasis on the beat and rhythm, leads to the extreme dancing in the streets for which Carnival is known, with citizens participating to the beat of the music, using mud and paint, dancing with the lower parts of the body. Henriques and Ferrara explain that people emphasise the "baseness" of the music, with everything being about the "bottom": the ground, the bottom of the body, and the bottom of the beat. The festival uses influences from the Jamaican dancehalls and British clubs, and the music is made loud enough for participants to feel the beat. The vibrations from the speakers allow people to better connect with the ground and bring their experience to another level.

The authors of the same article further explain how Notting Hill Carnival also creates "territory". The parade route portion of the Carnival is where carnival floats play both recorded and live music and circulate the street, visualizing the boundaries of Carnival and marking its territory. The circulating movement of the Carnival parade is also an extending of space through sound. Territorializing the space through sounds of African beats, such as the pan, fosters a sense of identity and unity for the overall Carnival.

Professor David Dabydeen wrote:

"Carnival is not alien to British culture. Bartholomew Fair and Southwark Fair in the 18th century were moments of great festivity and release. There was juggling, pickpocketing, whoring, drinking, masquerade – people dressed up as the Archbishop of Canterbury and indulged in vulgar acts. It allowed people a space to free-up but it was banned for moral reasons and for the anti-authoritarian behaviour that went on like stoning of constables. Carnival allowed people to dramatise their grievances against the authorities on the street... Notting Hill Carnival single-handedly revived this tradition and is a great contribution to British cultural life."

== Artists and musicians ==
Many carnival artists who created costumes and floats for bands and Samba Schools have left their mark, among them: Allyson Williams, the administrator and seamstress for the mas band Genesis, Clary Salandy of Mahogany Carnival, Carl Gabriel and Ray Mahabir.

Aswad's performance at Meanwhile Gardens at the 1983 Carnival was released as an album Live and Direct.

The Carnival further diversified in 1984 with the appearance of the London School of Samba and other samba schools followed in the 1990s.

Sound systems greatly expanded during the 1980s and 1990s, some of the biggest including Channel One, Saxon Sound, Mastermind Roadshow, RapAttack, and Good Times.

== Media coverage ==
Compared to other major music and art events such as Glastonbury Festival, Notting Hill Carnival has historically struggled to gain any live coverage outside of local media. The majority of carnival live broadcasts have been traditionally on BBC London radio (hitting a peak of coverage in the years of 2003 and 2004), and on BBC Radio 1Xtra in more recent years.

When the Golden Jubilee of Notting Hill Carnival was celebrated in 2016, 42 hours of live video coverage was broadcast by music live-streaming platform Boiler Room from the Rampage, Deviation, Aba Shanti-I, Channel One, Nasty Love, Saxon Sound, King Tubbys, Gladdy Wax and Disya Jeneration soundsystems.

Media coverage of the carnival can often centre on policing, public costs and public order while a 2026 working study puts forward a case for the generation of some £345 million from, for example, visitor spending on accommodation, food, and transport.

== Public order ==
Since the carnival did not have local authority permission, initial police involvement was aimed at preventing it taking place at all, which resulted in regular confrontation and riots. In 1976, the police had been expecting hostility due to what they deemed as trouble the year before. Consequently, after discovering pickpockets in the crowd, police took a heavy-handed approach against the crowds. The 1600-strong police force violently broke up the carnival, with the arrest of 60 people.

After the 1976 Notting Hill Carnival, the Police Federation pressed for the introduction of riot shields to protect police from objects thrown at them, although the shields also had the potential for aggressive use, as in 1977. A change of policy came after a confrontation in 1987, when the carnival was allowed to take place with police adopting a more conciliatory approach.

Some crimes associated with the carnival have taken place on its periphery: in 2007 two teenagers were wounded in separate shooting incidents just outside the carnival area on the Monday evening; however, police said there had been a decline in the number of carnival-linked arrests in comparison with the previous year.

The 2008 Carnival was marred by rioting at the very end of the weekend, involving about 40 youths battling with police, and more than 300 people were arrested. The carnival has come under criticism for its cost to the London taxpayer, with the 2023 estimate of cost of policing the event at nearly £12 million. However, it is argued that this should be put into context since the carnival is estimated to bring approximately £93,000,000 into the local economy.

Although the 2011 Carnival was at risk of being cancelled in the wake of the early August riots in the UK that year, it was seen as being relatively peaceful. Five people were arrested for a stabbing at Ladbroke Grove. The victim was one of 86 people who were taken to hospital. In total 245 people were detained by police over the two days of the carnival.

In 2016 there were more than 450 arrests, and five people were hurt in four knife attacks, the number of arrests reportedly higher than usual due to the recently introduced Psychoactive Substances Act 2016.

A report in 2019 indicated that, despite its reputation for crime, arrests as a proportion of attendance for 2016–18 were comparable to many other large events and festivals in the UK and Ishmahil Blagrove, co-author of the book Carnival: A Photographic and Testimonial History of the Notting Hill Carnival, states: "Notting Hill Carnival, compared to Trinidad or Brazil, is one of the safest in the world."

A report in 2004 by the GLA Policing Policy Director, Lee Jasper, criticised authorities for not addressing safety issues involved in more than a million people attending a small inner-city residential area. Met Police spokesman Dave Musker in November 2016 said: "Each year … we come exceptionally close to a major catastrophic failure of public safety where members of the public will suffer serious injury."

In the three weeks running up to the 2017 event, the police made 656 arrests, a pre-emptive crackdown. There were 313 arrests during the two days of the 2017 Carnival, compared with 454 the previous year.

During the 2018 event, due to the rising levels of violent crime in London, police deployed metal detectors to prevent weapons being brought to the event.

In 2024, two people died in separate attacks, and a further seven people were stabbed non-fatally, with three left with life-threatening conditions. 349 people were arrested: 72 for possession of an offensive weapon, one for possession of a firearm, 13 for sexual offences, 53 assaults on emergency workers, and 61 assaults on police officers.

The Metropolitan Police announced that facial recognition would be used for the first time at the 2025 carnival.

Since 1987, there have been eight deaths related to violence at carnival: 1987, 1991, two people in 2000, 2004, 2022, and two people in 2024.

== Transport ==
Transport for London run special limited-stop bus services from South London to the Carnival area:

- 2X from West Norwood and Brixton
- 36X from Peckham and Camberwell
- 436X from Peckham and Camberwell

Some London Underground stations are closed or are exit-only to ease congestion.

== Image gallery ==
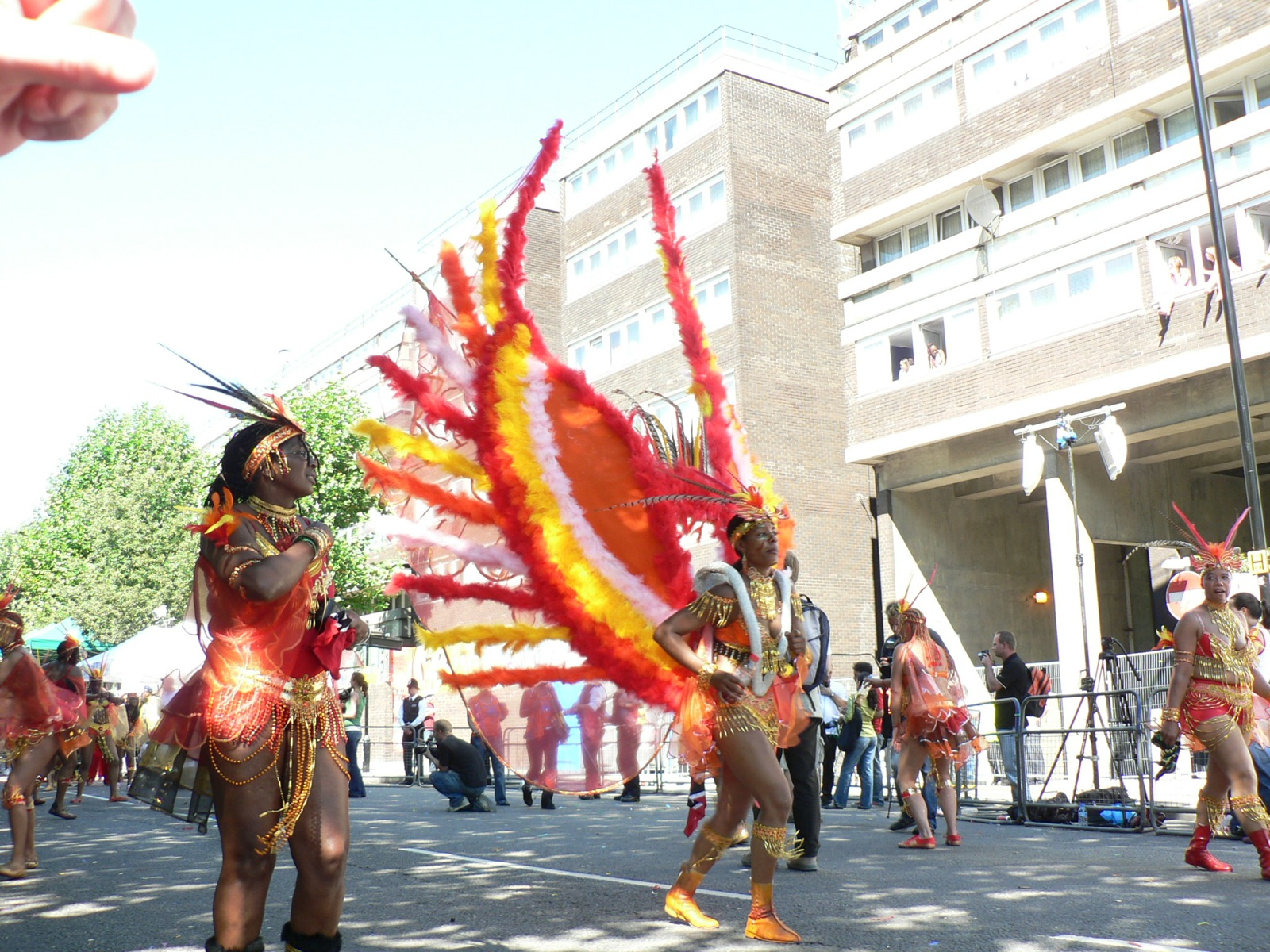
Mas parade, Carnival 2005

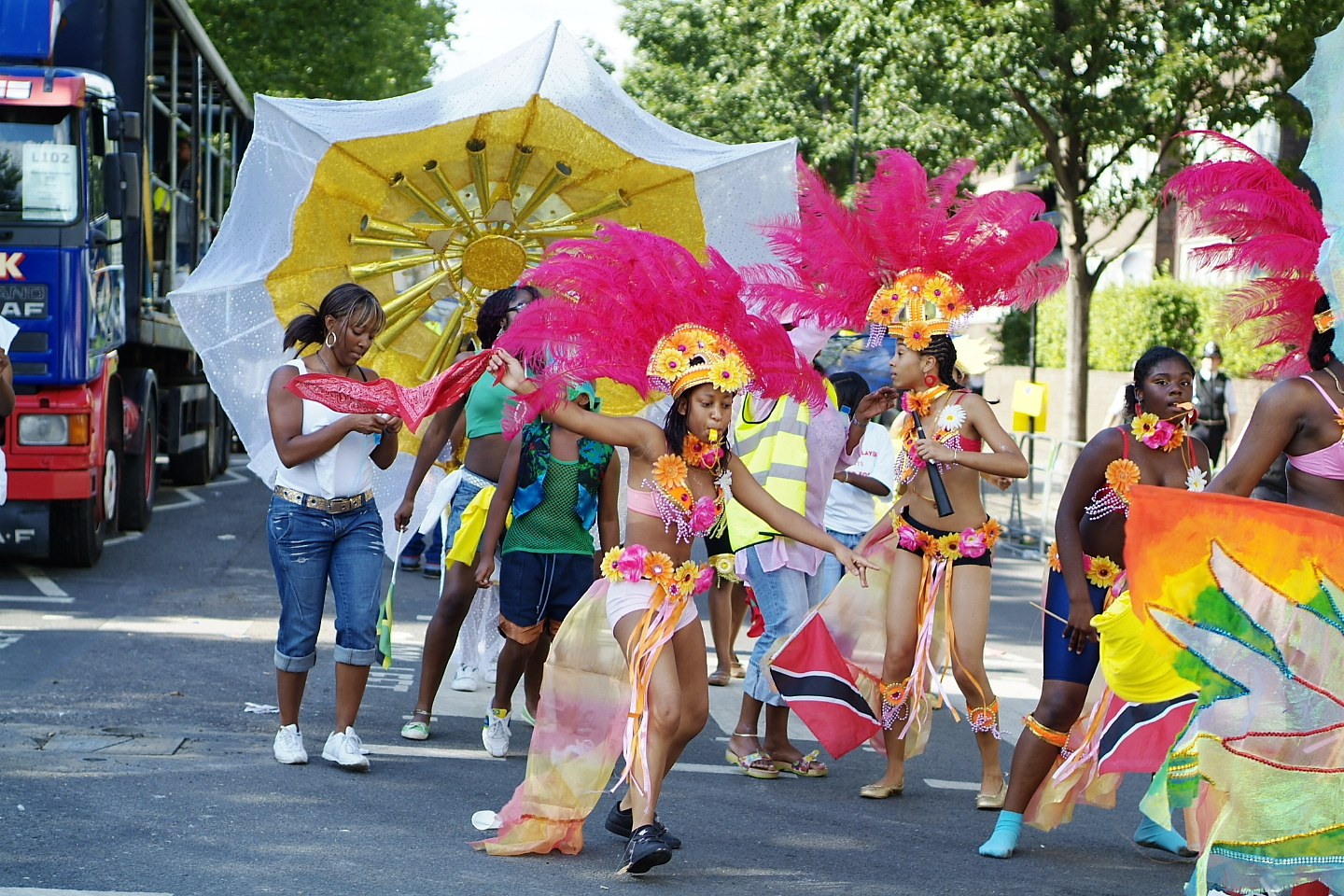
Mas parade, Carnival 2006

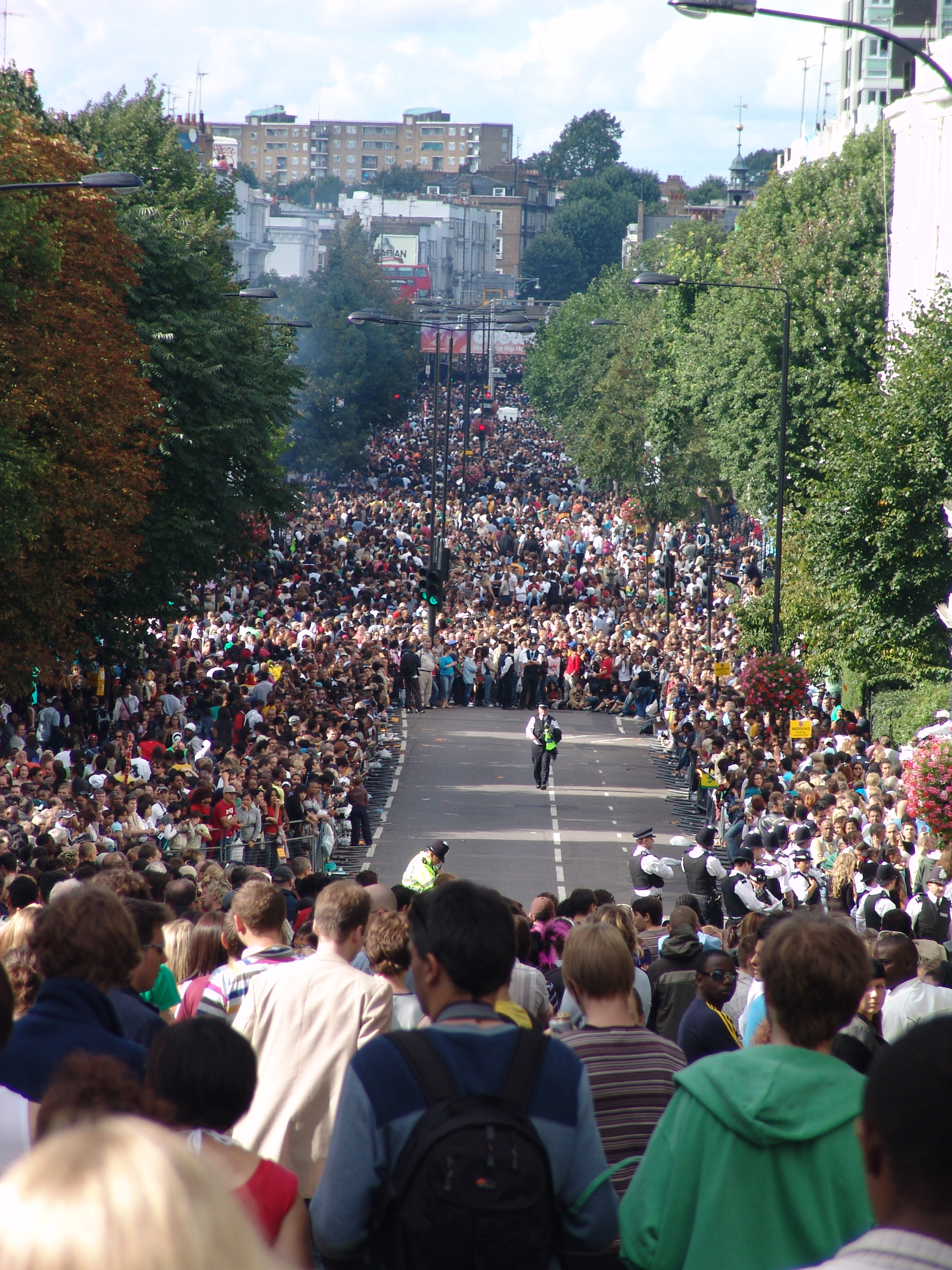
Crowds on Ladbroke Grove, Carnival 2006

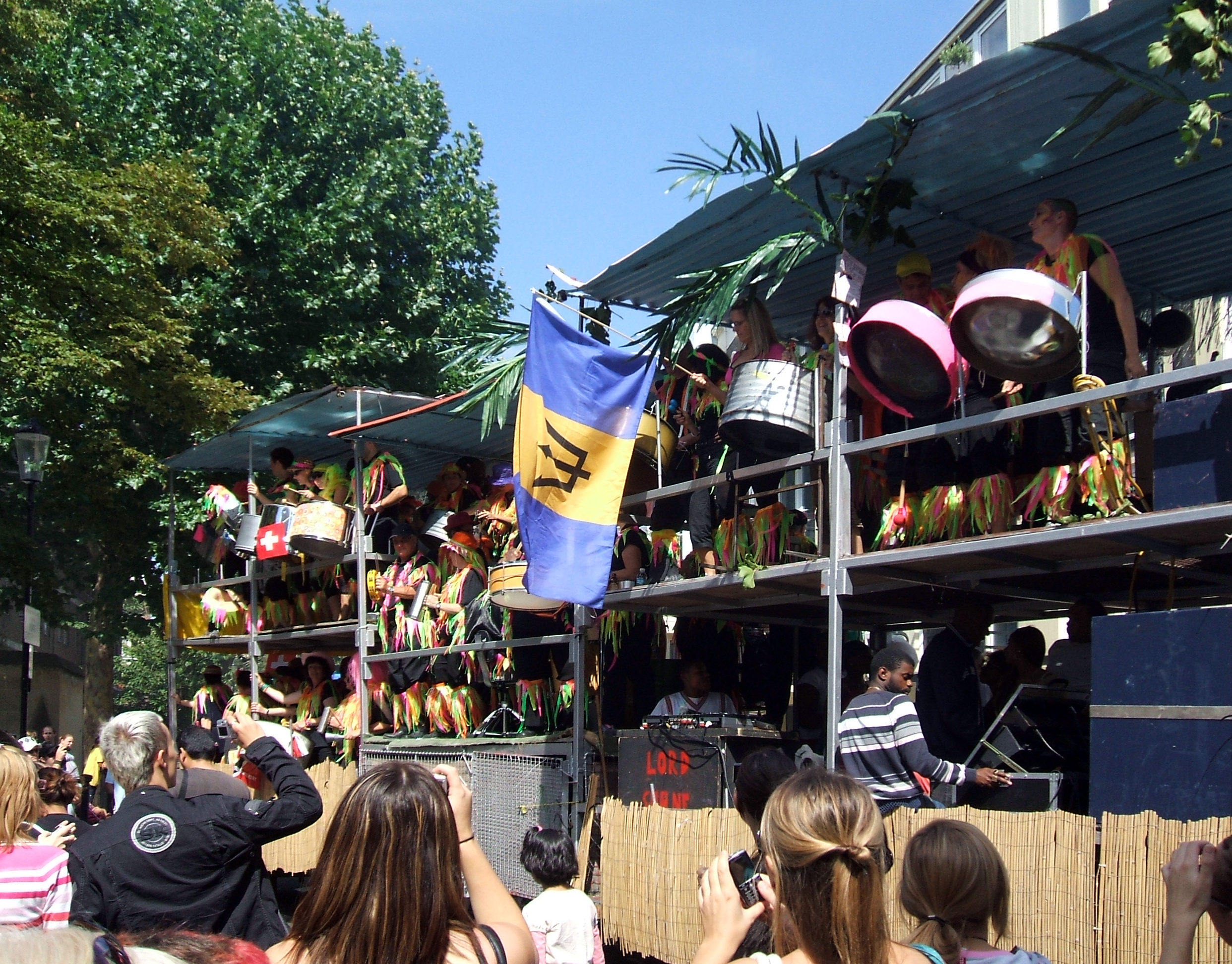
Steel pan drums on float, Carnival 2007

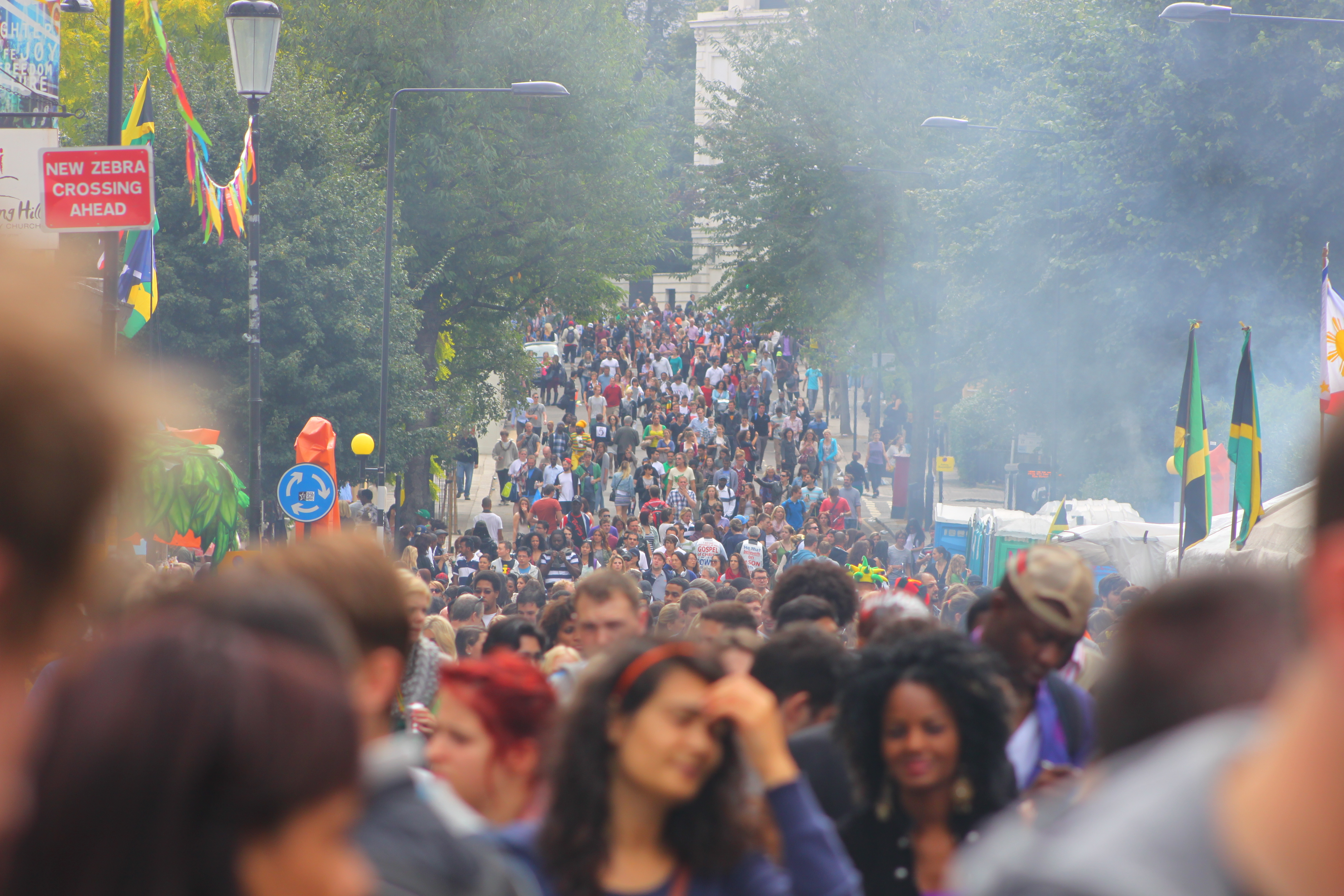
Carnival goers on the main drag, Carnival 2012

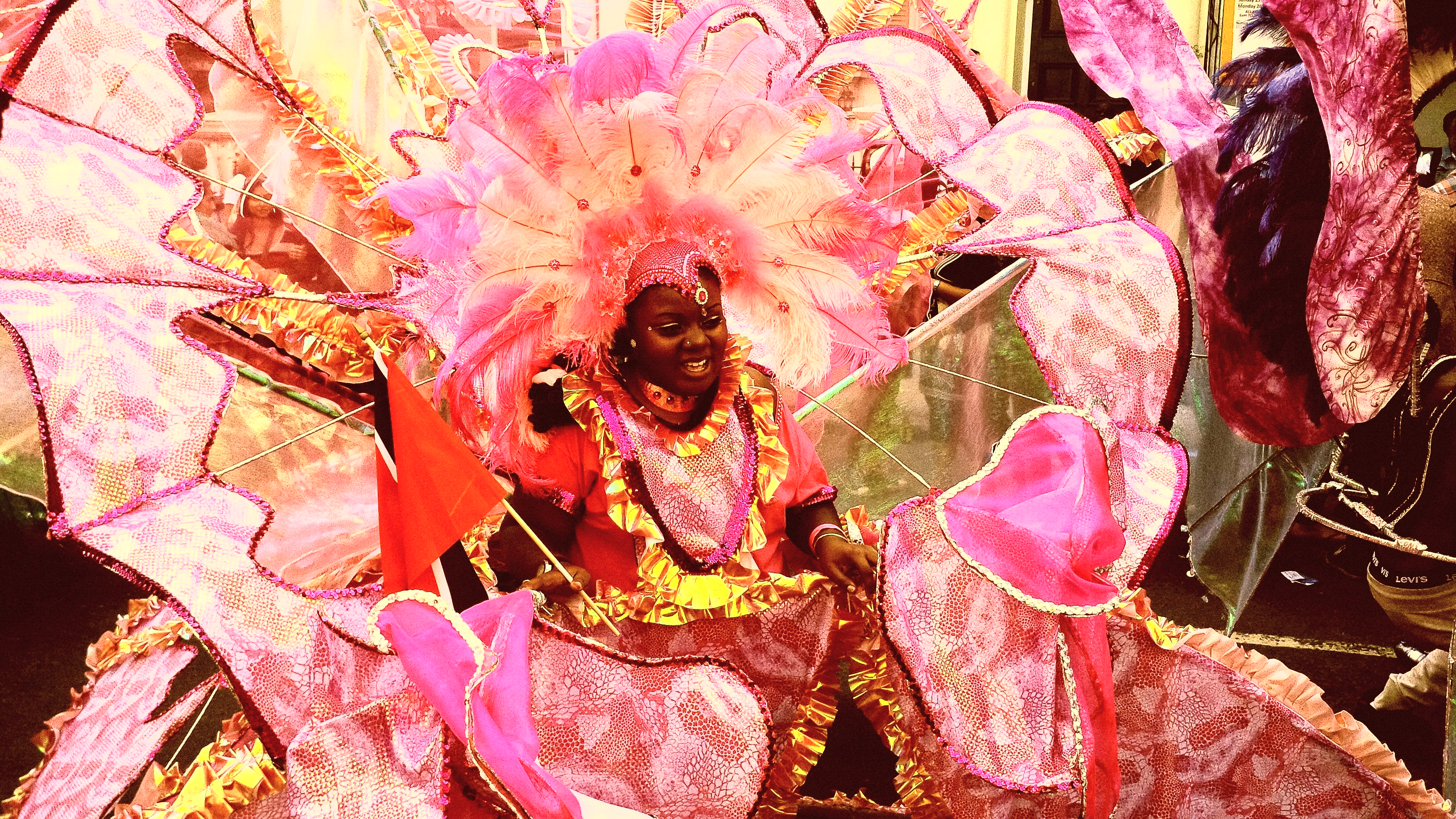
Mas parade, Carnival 2013

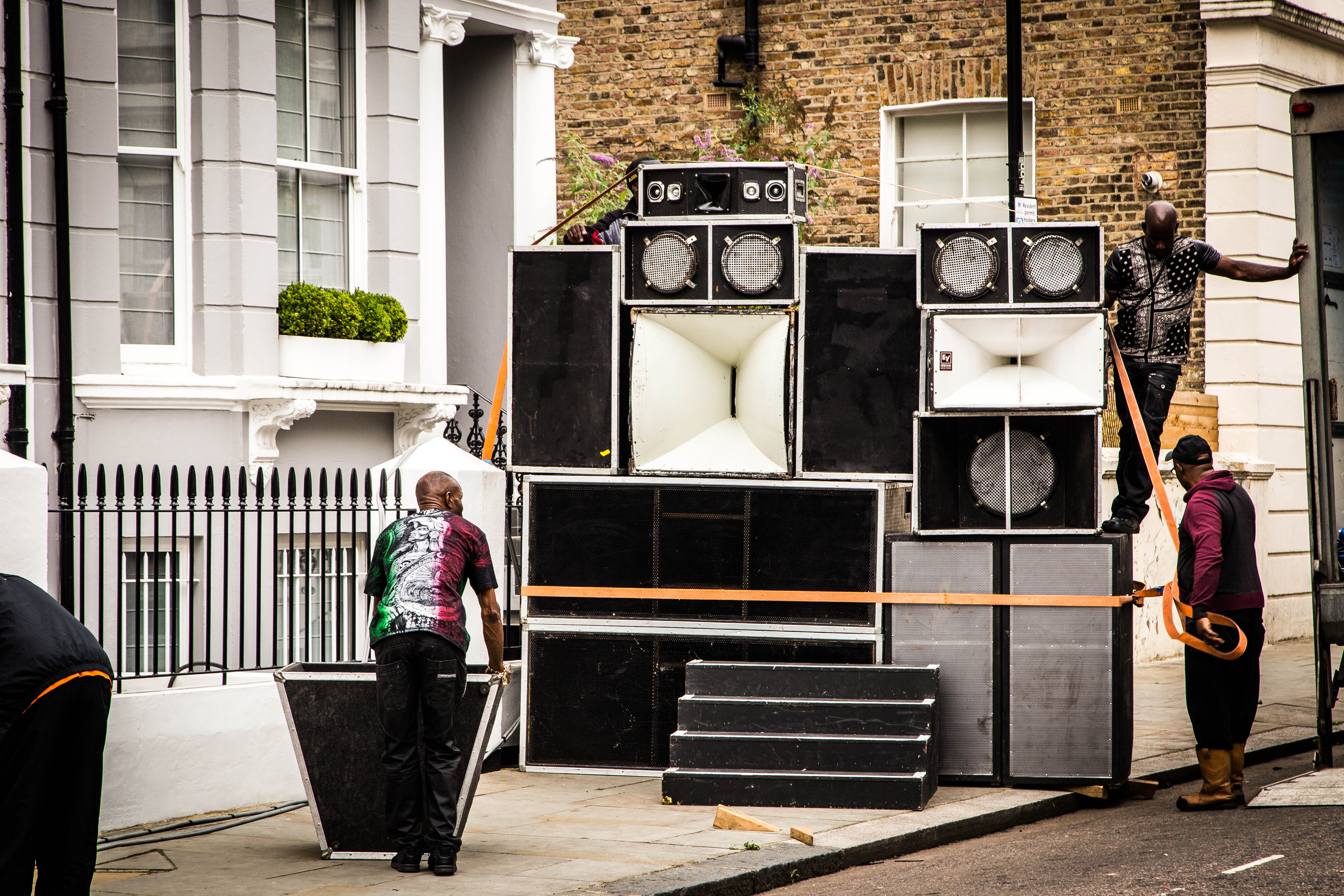
Setting up a sound system, Carnival 2014

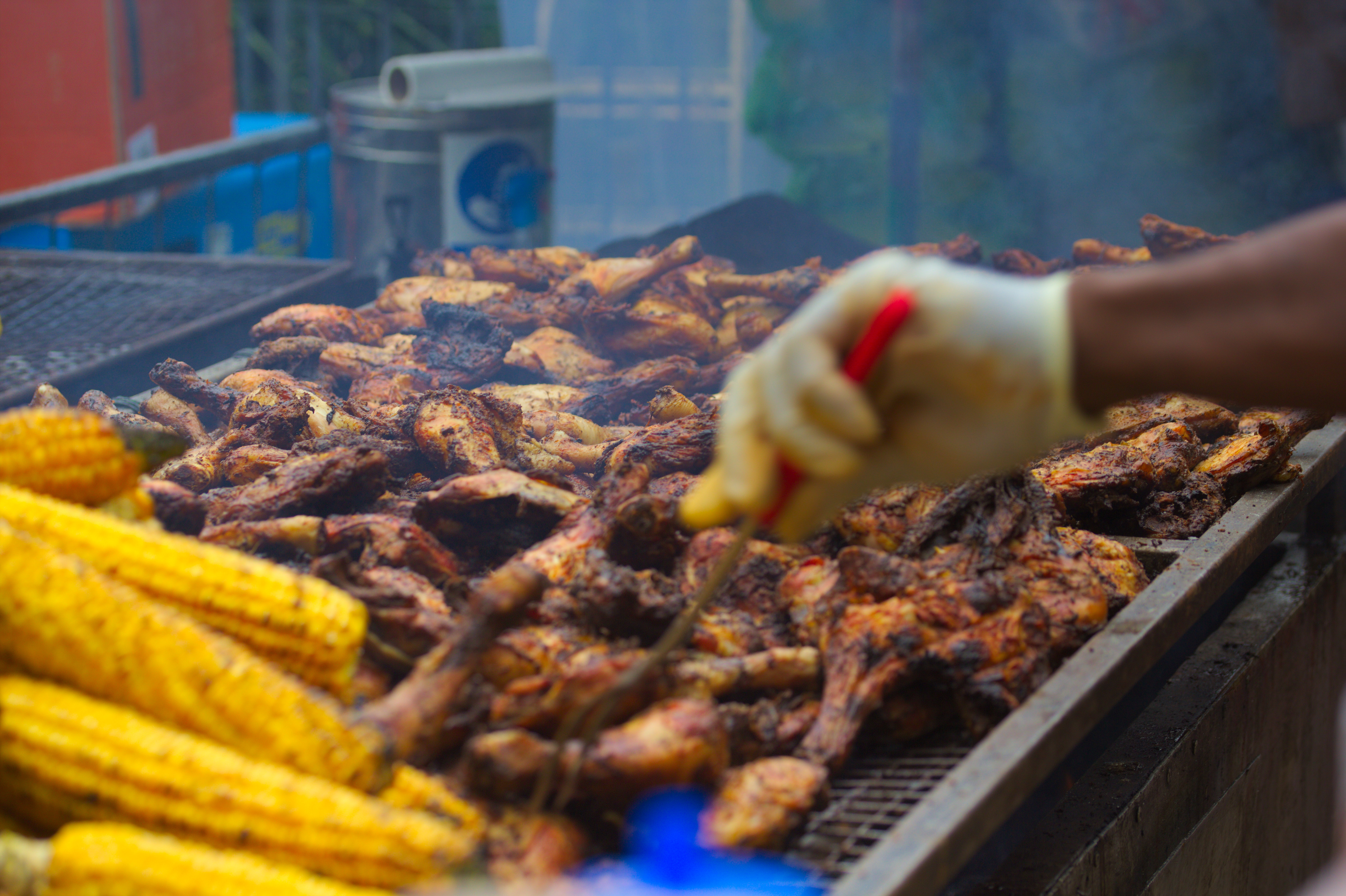
Jerk chicken and corn street food, Carnival 2015

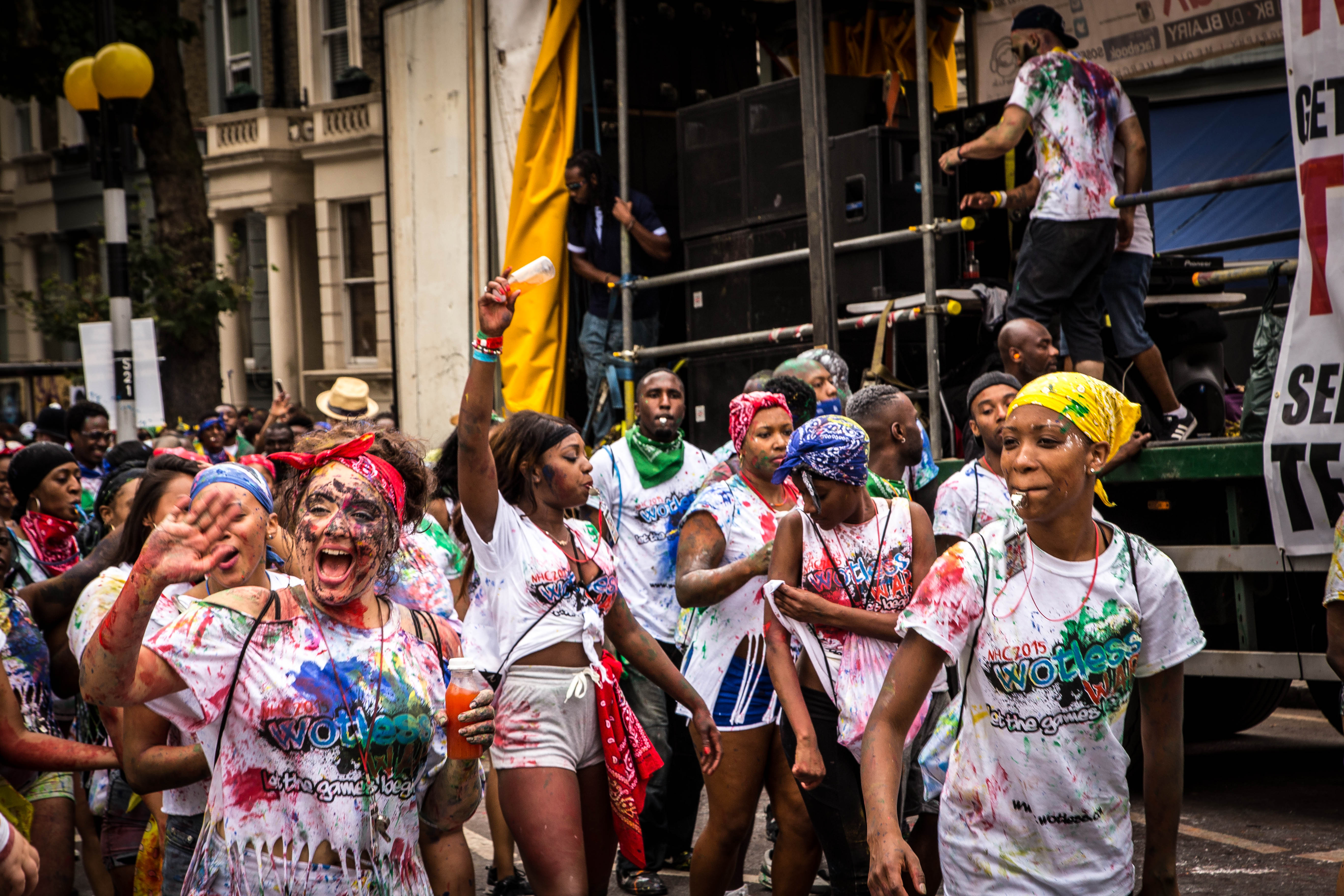
Float parade, Carnival 2015

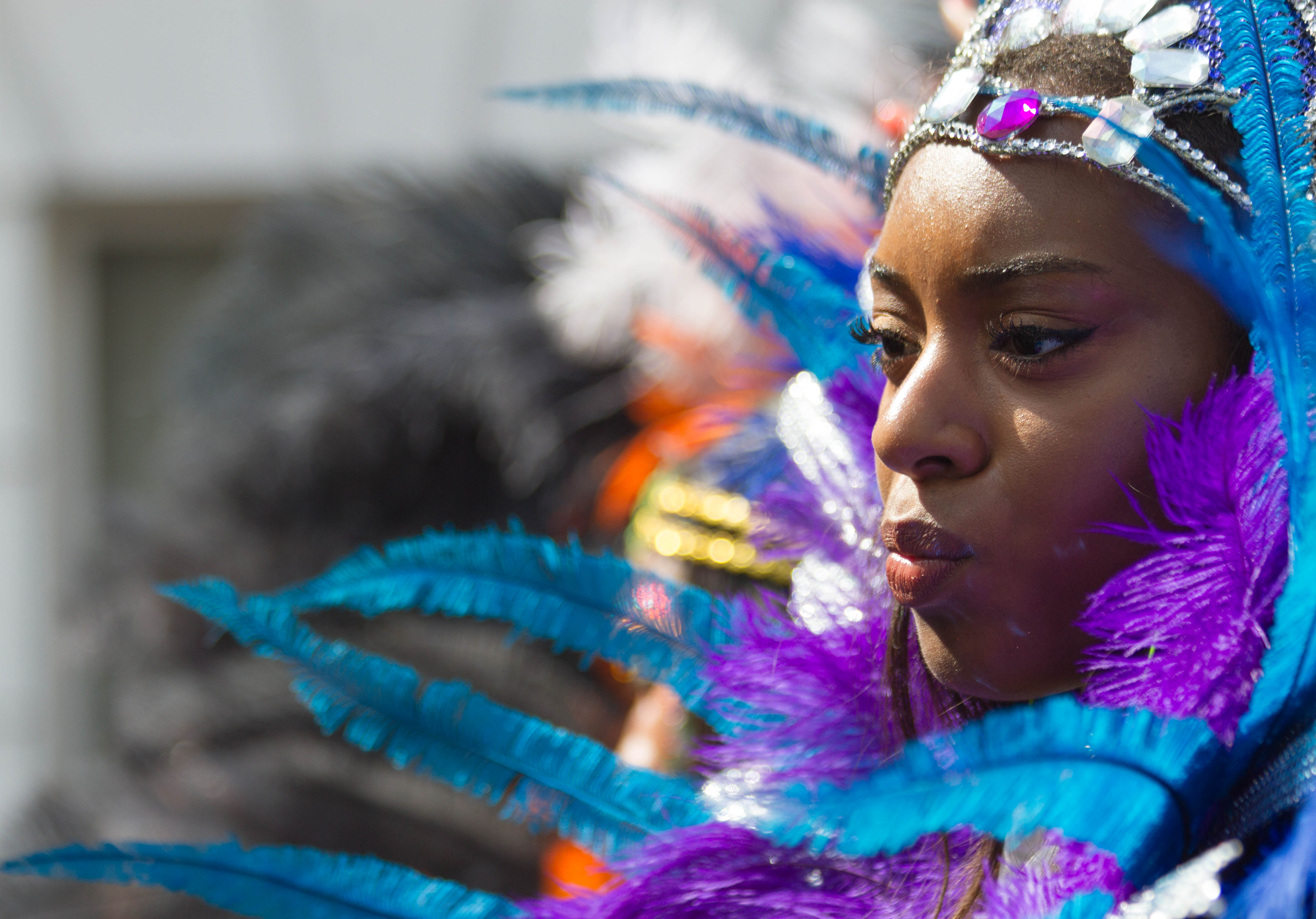
Mas dancer, Carnival 2016

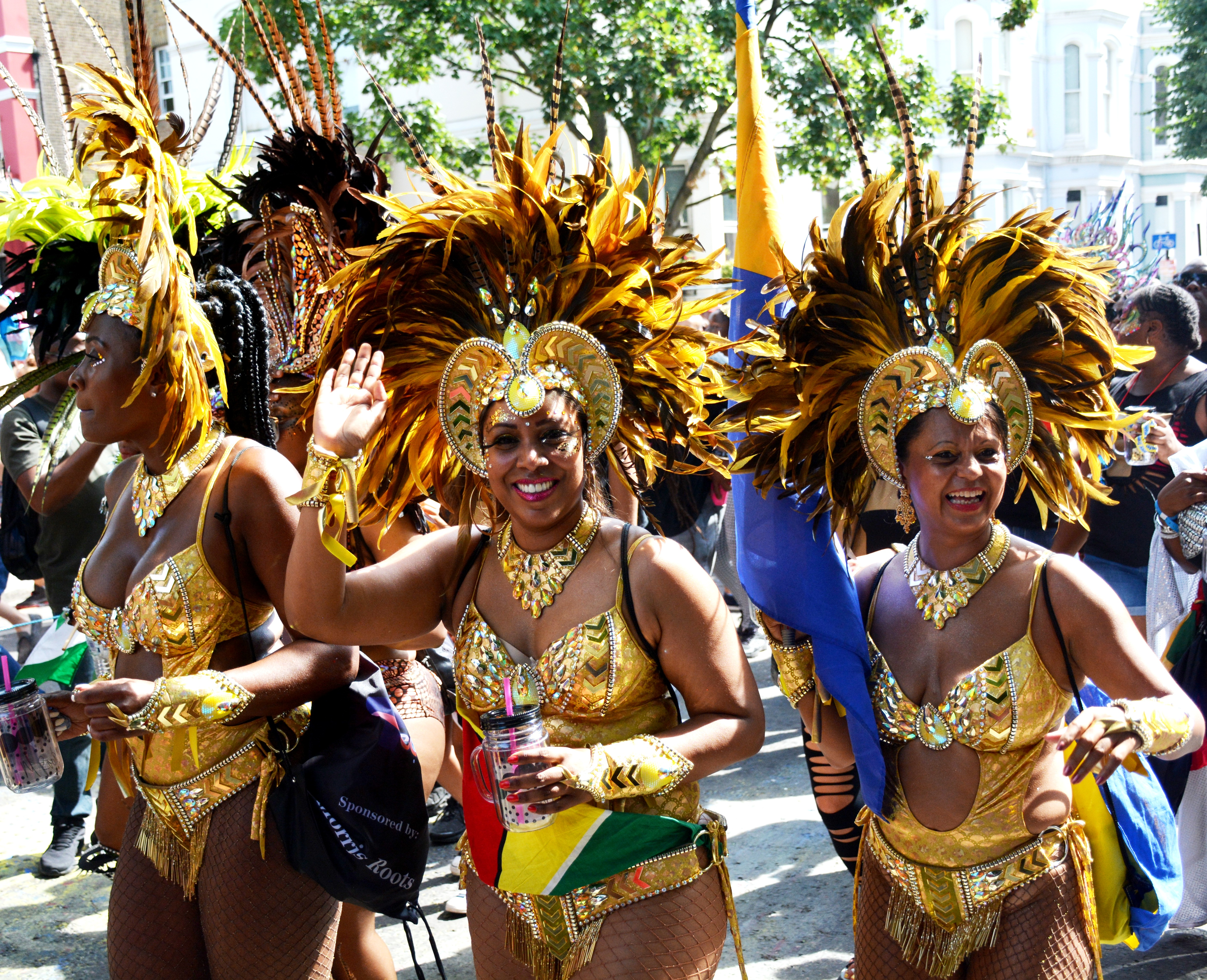
Mas parade, Carnival 2017

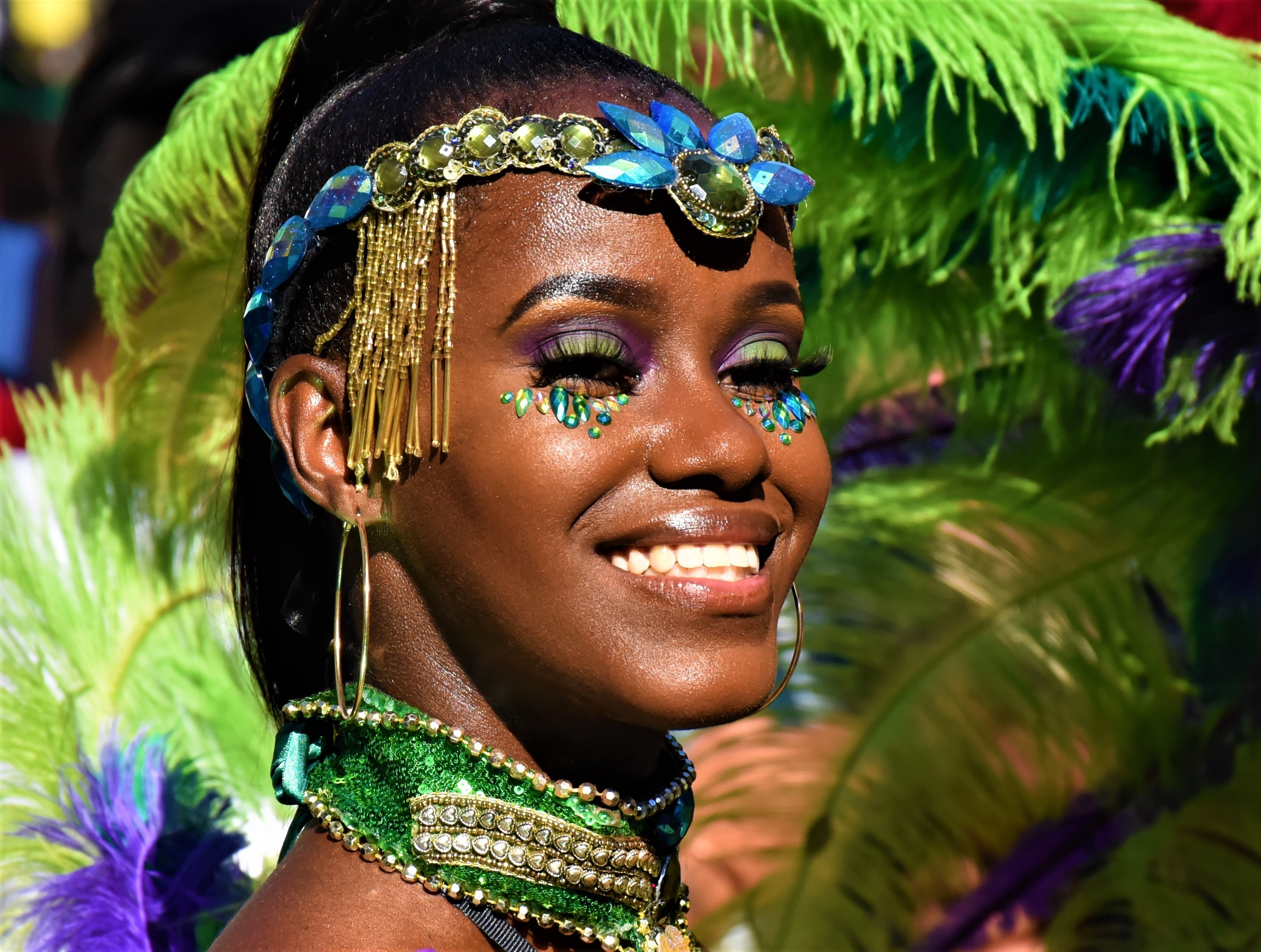
Mas dancer, Carnival 2019

== See also ==
- Leeds West Indian Carnival (also known as the "Chapeltown Carnival")
- St Pauls Carnival, Bristol
- Culture of London
