= Rachmaninoff (disambiguation) =

Sergei Rachmaninoff (1873–1943) was a Russian composer, pianist, and conductor.

Rachmaninoff or Rachmaninov may also refer to:

- Rachmaninoff (crater), a crater on Mercury
- Rachmaninoff (vodka), a German vodka
- Rakhmaninov (surname)

== See also ==
- Rakhmanov (disambiguation)
