= Russell Henderson =

Jazz musician (1924–2015)

Russell Henderson MBE
- Born: Russell Audley Ferdinand Henderson; 7 January 1924; Belmont, Port-of-Spain, Trinidad
- Died: 18 August 2015 (aged 91)
- Other name: Russ Henderson
- Education: North London Polytechnic
- Occupation: Jazz musician
- Known for: Founding figure of Notting Hill Carnival

Russell Audley Ferdinand "Russ" Henderson MBE (7 January 1924 – 18 August 2015) was a jazz musician on the piano and the steelpan. Originally from Trinidad and Tobago, he settled in England in the 1950s. As Kevin Le Gendre has stated in Jazzwise about Henderson: "Along with the likes of Rupert Nurse he was one of the key musicians to back London-based calypsonians such as the legendary Lord Kitchener during the heyday of the calypso and highlife label Melodisc, and he carried on developing myriad hybrids of jazz, West Indian and Latin music throughout the 1950s and 60s."

Henderson is most widely recognised as one of the founding figures of the Notting Hill Carnival in London, United Kingdom.

== Biography ==
Russell Henderson was born in Belmont, Port-of-Spain, where he grew up. He founded the Russell Henderson Quartet in the 1940s and was soon well known in Trinidad, accompanying calypsonians such as Lord Pretender, Mighty Growler and Roaring Lion. He was also pianist for Beryl McBurnie's dance troupe at the Little Carib Theatre in Woodbrook, and taught melodies to the steelpan pioneer Ellie Mannette of Invaders Steelband.

In 1951, Henderson travelled to England to study piano tuning at the North London Polytechnic.

He settled in England and founded Britain's first steelband combo (The Russ Henderson Steel Band) with Mervyn Constantine and Sterling Betancourt in late 1952. They played their first gig at The Sunset Club at 50 Carnaby Street. Other compatriots Henderson worked with in the early London days were calypsonians Lord Kitchener and Young Tiger. Henderson's steelband played at the "Caribbean Carnival" organised at St Pancras Town Hall in 1959 by Trinidadian activist Claudia Jones in response to the 1958 Notting Hill race riots.

From 1962, Henderson began playing on Sunday lunchtimes at the Coleherne pub on Old Brompton Road, Earls Court, where he was joined by other West Indian jazz musicians including Joe Harriott and Shake Keane, as well as by the likes of Graham Bond, John Surman, Davey Graham and Philly Joe Jones.

Henderson was vitally involved in building up Notting Hill Carnival, having played at the first Children's Carnival there in 1964. In 1966, a street party for neighbourhood children turned into a carnival procession when Henderson decided to liven things up by leading his steel band down the street, followed by a growing crowd. As Henderson recalled in 2007:

"A woman called Rhaune Laslett, a social worker, used to have a street fete for children and she asked me to play for the kids for free. It was a short street and she'd block it off and tie some buntings across. I agreed. Sterling Betancourt, Ralph Cherrie and I were playing, walking up and down the street. People here say three people can’t play pan, that’s not a steelband, but in England people liked it. At the street fete there were also a clown and a donkey cart. After a while the pan started to feel heavy around my neck, so I told the clown: 'Let's take a walk down the street.' We began to move and people joined us, all kinds of people who had gone shopping joined us with their bags, so we made a big circle before coming back to the fete."

With the procession being an overwhelming success, it was repeated the following year, and then became an annual event; according to music journalist Lloyd Bradley: "Within three or four years, it was being called the Notting Hill Carnival."

From 1971, Henderson was a friend of the 606 Club in Chelsea, where he performed a monthly show with his revised jazz quartet, sharing the evening with the Al Whynette Band. In his retirement Henderson gave numerous interviews with BBC Radio 4 and BBC Four on his Notting Hill past.

Russell Henderson died on 18 August 2015 at the age of 91.

== Honours ==
In 2006, Henderson was appointed a member of The Most Excellent Order of the British Empire (MBE) for Services to Music.

On Friday, 24 August 2012, just prior to the Notting Hill Carnival weekend, the Nubian Jak Community Trust organised the unveiling of two blue plaques in Notting Hill at the junction of Tavistock Road known as "Carnival Square", to honour the contributions to the development of Carnival by two "living giants": Russell Henderson, the Trinidadian musician who led the first carnival parade in 1965, and Leslie Palmer, also from Trinidad and Tobago, who is credited with helping transform the local community festival into an internationally recognised event.

== Film ==
- The Pan Man: Russell Henderson – 22-minute documentary, directed by Michael McKenzie (2009), London.

== Bibliography ==
- Contributor to Lloyd Bradley, Sounds Like London: 100 Years of Black Music in the Capital, 2013.

== Oral history ==
- British Library, Oral History of Jazz. Interviewed by Val Wilmer, 14 October 1993.
