= Rakhmanov (surname) =

Rakhmanov (feminine: Rakhmanova) is a surname. Notable people with the surname include:

- Aleksandr Rakhmanov (born 1989), Russian chess grandmaster
- Artsyom Rakhmanaw (born 1990), Belarusian footballer
- Aza Rakhmanova (1932 – 2015), Russian AIDS and Hepatitis expert
- Bakhodyr Rakhmanov (born 1964), Uzbekistani football player
- Christine Rakhmanov (1760–1827), Russian actress and singer
- Huseyn Rahmanov (1902–1938), Azerbaijani politician
- Mikhail Rakhmanov (born 1992), Kazakhstani ice hockey player
- Olga Rakhmanova (1871-1943), Russian actress and film director
- Shavkat Rakhmonov (born 1994), Kazakh mixed martial artist
- Sultan Rakhmanov (1950–2003), Ukrainian weightlifter
- Vagif Rakhmanov (born 1940), Azerbaijani artist
- Yuliya Rakhmanova (born 1991), Kazakhstani sprinter
- Zamira Rakhmanova (born 1995), Russian wrestler
- Zhurahon Rahmonov (1917–1977), founder of the theater named after Babur Osh, Kyrgyz Soviet film and theater actor

== See also ==
- Rakhmanov (disambiguation)
- Rachman (surname)
