= Tom the Great Sebastian =

Jamaican sound system

Tom the Great Sebastian was an early Jamaican sound system started by Tom Wong in 1950, named for a trapeze performer in Barnum and Bailey's circus. The group has been called "the all-time giant of sound systems" and helped launch several notable artists. Count Matchuki is generally credited as Tom's first deejay, before he joined Coxsone Dodd, and Duke Vin was one of Tom's selectors. The sound was also backed by Prince Buster. It was later known as Metromedia.

== History ==
Tom Wong, half Chinese-Jamaican and half Afro-Jamaican, owned a hardware store where he played music and got started in the music business by taking his equipment out to parties. He was "widely regarded as the leading sound system of his day," and helped popularize dancehall music and sound system dance, aided in no small part by powerful amplifiers built by fellow DJ Hedley Jones. In addition to the equipment, his musical selections (many imported directly from the United States) and his originality as a DJ have been credited for his success.

Tom played rhythm and blues loved by the "ghetto folk" and music intended to attract a more upper-class audience, such as merengue and calypso. There are rumors that Duke Reid, a competing sound system operator who started four years after Tom and is credited with bringing gangland-style tactics to dancehall, drove Tom out of the downtown area of Kingston using ruffians from the Back-O-Wall slum, but Duke Vin insists that Duke and Tom were friends and that Duke's followers never bothered Tom. The closest they came to a sound clash was a set of competing parties in adjacent yards; they never went head-to-head. Tom did, however, move away from the violence of the downtown area to the Silver Slipper club in the more upscale Cross Roads area, a move which did not harm him financially.

Tom the Great Sebastian was the most popular of the first generation of sound systems until the mid-1950s when the "big three" of the sound systems rose to popularity: Coxsone Dodd's Downbeat, Duke Reid's Trojan, and King Edwards's Giant. Tom Wong committed suicide in 1971. After his death, the sound system was continued by Lou Gooden, who changed its name to Metromedia, after a record label. In 1976 it was sold again to Haidan "Jimmy Metro" James. Metromedia became one of the most popular sounds of the 1980s, featuring the deejay Peter Metro and selector Sky Juice. The sound system still operates from its Woodford Park base.
