= Sound clash =

Competition in reggae and dancehall music

A sound clash is a musical competition in which members of opposing sound systems pit their skills against each other. Sound clashes take place in a variety of venues, both indoors and outdoors, and primarily feature reggae and dancehall music. The object is to beat or "kill" the competition.

In Jamaica, sound clashes, with their "violently martial ethos", date back at least to the 1950s, when systems such as Tom the Great Sebastian and Duke Reid's the Trojan clashed in the old Back-O-Wall (now Tivoli Gardens) neighborhood of Kingston. Sometimes these clashes turned violent, with one system destroying the other system's equipment. The first reported clash was between Tom the Great Sebastian and Count Nick in 1952.

Although sound clashes are perhaps most commonly associated with Jamaica, they also form an integral part of Black British culture in London, with early proponents such as Jah Shaka running sound systems and engaging in sound clashes as early as the 1970s. Franco Rosso's 1980 film Babylon offered a look into London's sound system and sound clash culture, focusing on the Deptford and Brixton areas.

== Characteristics ==
In the early days of sound clashes, in Jamaican dancehall culture, sound systems would bring their own sound equipment—heavy bass sounds (that can be heard miles away) are especially important.

Sound clashes typically play Jamaican music from 1950 up to present recorded singles, and often utilize exclusive dubplates. Occasionally, sound systems would go so far as to pay artists to secure exclusive use of dubplates.

Appreciation for the dubplates and riddims played are shown in the form of "forwards", a surge of the crowd towards the front of the dance/towards the DJ booth. In particular, a "deep forward" originates from the back of a dance, where the aficionados (or "heads") typically stand.

== Rules ==
The first round is no elimination, each sound system plays a set time. Second round each sound system plays but one sound system being eliminated by poor performance, poor quality or by playing back a song. Elimination continues until two sounds are left, for example Bredda Hype sound vs Sound Trooper. The time interval gets shorter and shorter, with the introduction of television clashes, so when playing returns to one sound again, they may only play a shorter time, 15 minutes. Near the end of the clash they go song on song or "Dub fi dub".

Traditionally, all dubplates must feature the DJ's name, marking it as exclusive for that particular DJ, otherwise the DJ faces instant disqualification. Also, if a DJ were to play a dubplate based on a "riddim" already played during the clash he/she could face disqualification.

Where only two sound systems are playing, winning is based on 10 dub plates in tune for tune, regardless of who leads all night.
