= Rahmans =

Mythical nation of righteous Christians

Rahmans (Ukrainian: рахма́ни, Russian: рахманы, Romanian: rohmani, blajini) are, according to Romanian and Ukrainian popular beliefs, a mythical nation of righteous Christians.

== Name ==
The name "Rahmans" derives from the Indian caste of Brahmins, (Ukrainian: брахмани), 'Brahmani', who, in Eastern Orthodox apocrypha, were presented as exemplary Christians. A well-known Byzantine apocryph of this kind is, in Russian translation, "Хождение Зосимы к Рахманам" (Note: The apocryph "The Pilgrimage of Zosima to Rahmans" was known in Kievan Rus' since (at the latest) the 16th century.) ("The Pilgrimage of Zosima to Rahmans").

The etymology of the word blajini ([blaˈʒinʲ]) is the Old Slavonic blažĕnŭ meaning kind, well-minding person. (Note: In East Orthodox tradition the term "blazhenny" (Russian: Блаженный) is often used as an epithet of well-known yurodivys and some saints, and usually is translated as "blessed.)

== Rahmanish Easter ==
Following the Orthodox Christian calendar, Romanians from Banat, Transylvania, Bukovina and Maramureș regions celebrate the Rahmanish Easter (Romanian: Paştele Blajinilor) on the first Monday after St. Thomas Sunday. The Rahmanish Easter is called also Easter of the Dead or Mighty Easter.

Ukrainians celebrate the Rahmanish Easter (Ukrainian: Рахманський Великдень) on Mid-Pentecost.

Since Rahmans supposedly live in isolation and have no year computation of their own, they have no way of knowing when Easter comes. It is for this reason that Romanians and Ukrainians eat dyed eggs and let the shells flow downstream, from there they believe they will get to the Rahmans. There is a custom in Oster, Lityn, and Lutsk districts to throw egg shells into the river on Easter Eve.

== Romanian beliefs ==
They are described as anthropomorphic and short, sometimes having the head of a rat. They are either described as malicious or as having great respect for God and leading a sinless life. They are considered to fast the year through, and thus doing humans a great service.

Blajin also means a dead child who did not receive the benediction of Holy Spirit. The ethnographer Marian Simion Florea wrote : Blajini are fictitious beings, incarnations of dead children not baptized who live at the end of Earth, nearby The Holy water (of Saturday). Some explain them as the descendants of Adam's son Seth. Others think that they used to live alongside humans on the earth, but Moses, seeing his people oppressed by them, split the waters and, after he and his people had retreated to safety, poured the waters back onto them, sending them to their current abode.

== Ukrainian beliefs ==
According to various beliefs, Rahmans dwell underground or live on the Rahmans' island.
