= Sound system (Jamaican) =

Group of disc jockeys hosting mobile discos, in Jamaica

In Jamaican popular culture, a sound system is a group of disc jockeys, sound engineers and MCs playing music such as ska, rocksteady, reggae, dub reggae, dancehall and ragga. Sound systems are an important part of Jamaican culture and history, especially with the Windrush generation in Britain. Sound clashes involve crew members from opposing sound systems pitting their DJing and MCing skills against each other in venues or at festivals.

== History ==
The sound system concept first became popular in the 1940s, in the parish of Kingston. DJs would load up a truck with a generator, turntables, and huge speakers and set up street parties. Tom the Great Sebastian, founded by Chinese-Jamaican businessman Tom Wong, was the first commercially successful sound system and influenced many sound systems that came later. In the beginning, the DJs played American rhythm and blues music, but as time progressed and more local music was created, and the sound migrated to a local flavour. The sound system remained successful when the conservative, BBC-modeled Jamaican establishment radio refused to play the people's music, while DJs could play whatever they wanted and favored local sounds such as reggae. Sound systems were big business, and were one of the few sure ways to make money in the unstable economy of the area. The promoter or DJ made profits by charging admission and selling food and alcohol with often thousands of people in attendance.

By the mid-1950s, the sound system was more popular at parties than live musicians, and by the second half of the decade, custom-built systems began to appear from the workshops of specialists such as Hedley Jones, who constructed wardrobe-sized speaker cabinets that he called "House[s] of Joy". It was also around this time that Jamaica's first superstar DJ and MC, Count Machuki, rose to prominence. As time progressed, sound systems became louder—capable of delivering bass at power levels of 30,000 watts or more, with similar wattage attainable at the mid-range and high frequencies—and far more complex than their predecessors. Competition between these sound systems was fierce, and eventually three DJs emerged as the stars of the scene: Clement "Coxsone" Dodd, Duke Reid and King Edwards. Besides the DJ, who rapped over the music, there was also a selector, who selected the music/rhythm tracks.

Writer Lloyd Bradley has described Jamaican sound system sessions as highly participatory, with a close relationship between deejays and their audiences. Performances often involved crowd interaction, with attendees singing along to popular or exclusive tracks, sometimes encouraged by the operator lowering the volume during choruses. This dynamic reinforced a sound system's reputation and encouraged showmanship, distinctive stage personas, and the continual pursuit of exclusive recordings.

The popularity of a sound system was mainly contingent on one thing: having new music. In order to circumvent the release cycle of the American record labels, the sound system operators turned to record production. Initially, they produced only singles for their own sound systems, known as "Exclusives" or Dubplates—a limited run of one copy per song. What began as an attempt to replicate the American R&B sound using local musicians evolved into a uniquely Jamaican musical genre: ska. This shift was due partly to the fact that as American-style R&B was embraced by a largely white, teenage audience and evolved into rock and roll, sound system owners created—and played—a steady stream of the singles the people preferred: fast-shuffle boogies and ballads. In response to this shift in supply, Jamaican producers introduced to their work some of the original elements of the Jamaican sound: rhythm guitars strumming the offbeat and snare-drum emphasis on the third beat, for example. As this new musical form became more popular, both Dodd and Reid began to move more seriously into music production. Coxsone Dodd's production studio became the famous Studio One, while Duke Reid founded Treasure Isle.

As sound systems continued to gain in popularity through the 1960s and 1970s, they became politicized in many instances. The DJs would often satirize current affairs and local events, taking on a "singing newspaper" role. Many sound systems, and their owners, were labelled as supporters of a particular political party (such as the PNP or the JLP), but most of the sound systems tried to maintain political neutrality. Nevertheless, as a cultural and economic phenomenon, the sound system was affected by the vast socio-political changes taking place in Jamaica at this time.

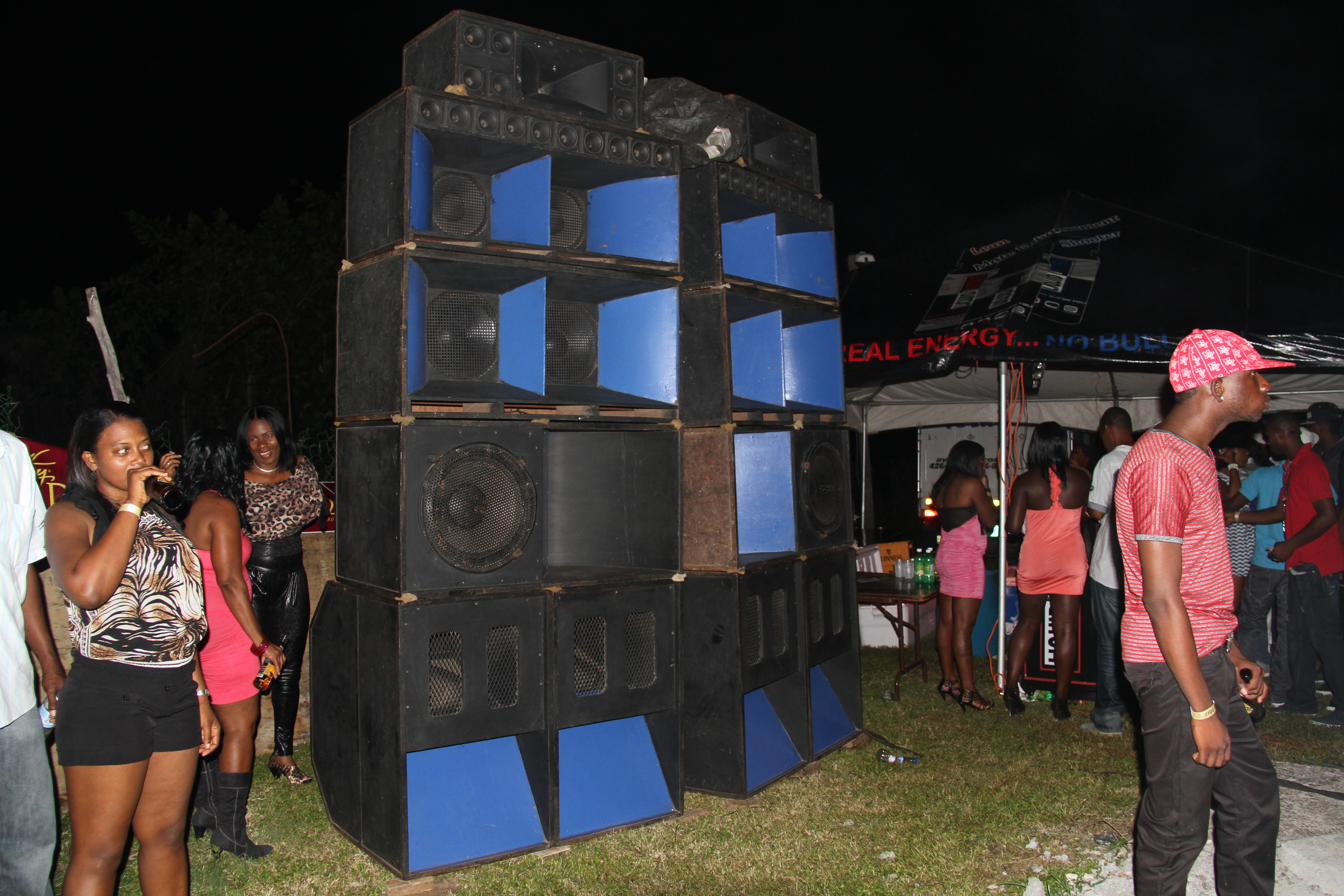
A typical large sound system in Jamaica, 2012

An important part of sound system culture is the sound clash, an organized battle between two systems. The Guinness Sounds of Greatness is one of many such clashes. In 2009, the Guinness clash was organized into three parts: a "juggling" round, where each system gets 15 minutes to get the crowd going; a "tune fe tune" exchange of "commercial releases"; and a "dub-fe-dub", when the systems alternate "specials done specifically for the sound system playing the recording".

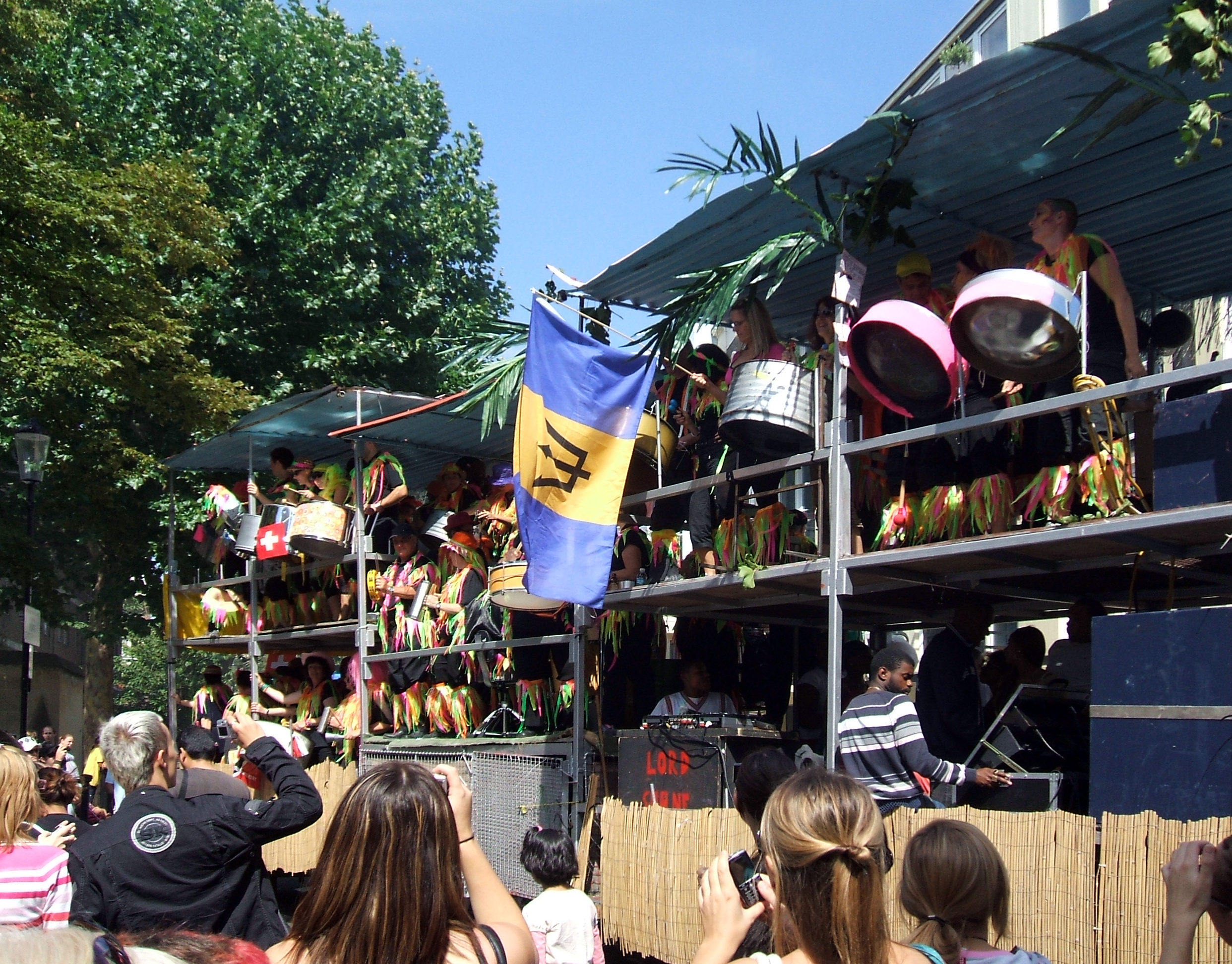
Sound system at Notting Hill Carnival, London, 2007

The culture of the sound system was brought to the UK with the mass immigration of Caribbean people in the 1960s and 1970s. Notable UK sound systems include Sir Coxsone Outernational, Jah Shaka, Channel One, Aba Shanti-I, Jah Observer, Quaker City, Iration Steppas, Fatman International and Saxon Studio International. One of the first sound systems in the United States was Downbeat the Ruler, founded in Bronx, New York, in the late 1970s.

DJ Kool Herc, known as the Father of Hip-Hop, was responsible for importing many of the elements of Jamaican sound system culture to New York. Having immigrated with his family to the Bronx from Kingston at the age of 12, Herc grew up around dancehall parties, and despite being too young to enter, he would hang out outside the parties and listen to the music. When he started hosting his own parties in New York, he was known for having the loudest and most impressive sound system of anyone in the city, which heavily emphasized bass. He also introduced MCs (masters of ceremony) to the Bronx party scene, who are considered by some to be the first hip-hop rappers, as they emulated the toasting style of Jamaican reggae deejays.

Sound systems were the method in which Jamaican migrants were able to maintain their cultural connection with their roots. They broadcast the remixed samples of reggae beats and created an underground music culture. These sound systems were played in warehouses, clubs, and street corners. This was not simply just music played on the radio for a few people to hear, but a culture that involved many people was developed out of being consumed by sound through large sound systems. Sound system culture presented what Julian Henriques refers to as sonic dominance. He is strategic in his usage of the word dominance because it is visceral and this term embodies the "power and the pleasure of the sonic" (452). The sound is an "enveloping, immersive, and intense experience" (451). The experience is so strong that "sounds carry people, as much as people carry sounds; 'vibes' find bodies to move" (230). Dance acts as a natural, immediate response to dancehall sounds, and as Henriques puts it, "bodies have no musical burden to bear; rather they are borne along, even berthed, by music."

According to Henriques, the sound system has also played an influential role in the global influence of Jamaican music internationally. It has "proved itself to be one of the most efficient of musical distribution mechanisms," (218) which has resulted in Jamaican music's influence on genres such as hip hop, jungle, and dubstep. While part of its influence can literally be credited to its superior audio fidelity over radio, the sound system also acts as a symbolic transmitter of shared experiences across the African diaspora.

== In popular culture ==
The 1978 Jamaican film Rockers featured authentic culture, characters and mannerisms of the 1970s Jamaican reggae scene, featuring Leroy "Horsemouth" Wallace with his wife and children and in his own home, and the Harry J Studios in Kingston.

The film Babylon, released in 1980, captured the smoldering tensions between White and Black Britons centred around Brixton's sound system culture in the 1970s and 1980s. It was given an X rating in the UK and blacklisted in the United States, due to its depiction of institutional racism. After its premiere at Cannes, it was 40 years before it would be re-released by Kino Lorber in 2019 and made available in the United States on The Criterion Channel in 2020.

Menelik Shabazz's 2011 documentary The Story of Lover's Rock tells the story of the intimate dance, soundsystems, and social backdrop of the Afro-Caribbean community of South London in the ’70s and ’80s.

Lovers Rock, part of the 2020 Amazon anthology series Small Axe, is Steve McQueen's paean to the lovers rock genre and its influences between the diaspora communities of the "Black Atlantic" culture of the British West Indian community of 1980s London.

== See also ==
- Music of Jamaica
- Toasting (Jamaican music)

== Bibliography ==
- Barrow, Steve; Paul Dalton (1997). Reggae: The Rough Guide. London: The Rough Guides. ISBN 1-84353-329-4.
- Gooden, Lou (2012). Reggae Heritage: The Culture, Music And Politic (Volume 1). New York: CreateSpace Independent Publishing Platform. ISBN 978-1480050099.
- Henriques, J. F. (2003). "Sonic Dominance and the Reggae Sound System Session." In M. Bull and Les Back, eds. The Auditory Culture Reader. Oxford: Berg, pp. 451–480. ISBN 1859736130. [Book Section]: Goldsmiths Research Online
- Stolzoff, Norman (2000). Wake the town and tell the people: dancehall culture in Jamaica. Durham and London: Duke University Press. ISBN 0-8223-2514-4.
