= Rhaune Laslett =

British activist (1919–2002)

- Born: Freda Pulverness; 15 November 1919; Stepney, London, England
- Died: 28 April 2002 (aged 82); London, England
- Other name: Frederica R.A.J. Pulvernes or Gibbons
- Occupation: Community activist
- Known for: Organiser of the Notting Hill Fayre or Festival, which evolved into the Notting Hill Carnival
- Spouse(s): Terence A. Laslett, m. 1947 (div.); James O'Brien, m. 1968

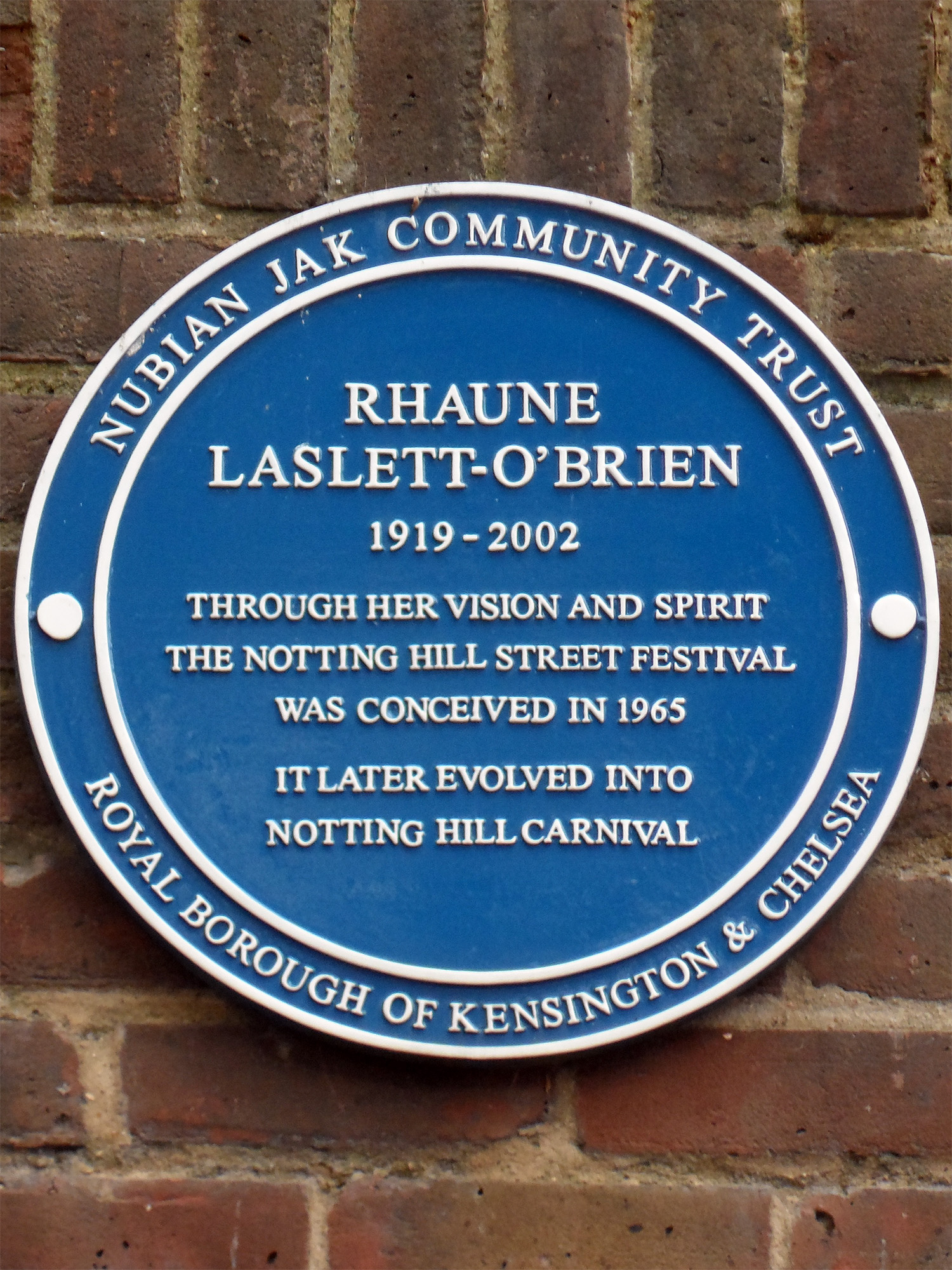
Her plaque

Rhaune Laslett (15 November 1919 – 28 April 2002) was an English community activist and the principal organiser of the Notting Hill Fayre or Festival, that evolved into the Notting Hill Carnival.

== Biography ==
Rhaune Laslett was born Freda Pulverness in Stepney in the East End of London. Her mother Jennie was the daughter of Harris and Betsy Noskovitch. Her father was Abraham Pulverness. Laslett often claimed that she was of Native American heritage.

With the name Frederica R.A.J. Pulvernes or Gibbons, she married Terence A. Laslett in 1947 and was later divorced.

Laslett became president of the London Free School, organised by a coalition of local activists, including some emerging underground artists of the area, particularly John "Hoppy" Hopkins. The aims of the school were "to promote cooperation and understanding between people of various races and creeds through education and through working together". John Michell and Michael X provided 26 Powis Terrace as a base and the idea was born of a free fayre or festival, which became the Notting Hill Carnival.

She set up the Children's Play Group at 34 Tavistock Crescent that was visited on 15 May 1966 by Muhammad Ali prior to his fight against Henry Cooper.

In 1968, she married James O'Brien in London.

== Notting Hill Carnival ==
In a series of articles to newspaper correspondents and in The Grove (newsletter of the London Free School), Laslett outlined the aims of the festival – that the various culture groups of Notting Hill become more familiar with each other's customs, to bring more colour and life to the streets and to counter the perception of the area being a run-down slum. As she stated to The Grove, "We felt that although West Indians, Africans, Irish and many other nationalities all live in a very congested area, there is very little communication between us. If we can infect them with a desire to participate then this can only have good results." The "Notting Hill Fayre and Pageant", or the London Free School Fair, was held over a week starting on 18 September 1966, and, as well as featuring a pageant that included "a man dressed as Elizabeth I and children as Charles Dickens characters", there was "a Portobello parade consisting of the London Irish girl pipers, a West Indian New Orleans-style marching band, Ginger Johnson's African-Cuban band, and Russell Henderson's Trinidadian steelband from the Coleherne pub in Earl's Court, followed by 2 fire engines".

As Gary Younge has written, Laslett "spoke to the local police about organising a carnival". With more of an English fete in mind, she invited the various ethnic groups of what was then the poor area of Notting Hill - Ukrainians, Spanish, Portuguese, Irish, Caribbeans and Africans - to contribute to a week-long event that would culminate with an August bank holiday parade....She borrowed costumes from Madame Tussaud's; a local hairdresser did the hair and make-up for nothing; the gas board and fire brigade had floats; and stallholders in Portobello market donated horses and carts. Around 1,500 people turned up, according to police figures."

== Neighbourhood Service ==
Out of the new-found energy in and around the Free School, and George Clark's work to establish the Community Workshop, Laslett established the Notting Hill Neighbourhood Service, one of the first voluntary services to offer free legal and drugs advice as well as an all-round welfare service. The work of the service is featured in a chapter of the 1968 book Drop Out by Robin Farquharson.

== Legacy ==
Laslett's Carnival: A Photography Exhibition, a photographic journey into the history of Notting Hill Carnival and its early pioneers, was held at The Tabernacle, Notting Hill, in August 2011.

On 26 August 2011, a blue plaque commemorating Laslett's conception of the Notting Hill street festival that "later evolved into Notting Hill Carnival" was unveiled on the corner of Tavistock Square and Portobello Road (organised by the Nubian Jak Community Trust), facing another blue plaque that commemorates Claudia Jones, who in 1959 organised an indoor Caribbean carnival event.

On the eve of the 2016 Carnival, in a series of articles, the leading black newspaper The Voice recognised that "Yes, this is Notting Hill Carnival's 50th year" and "Rhaune Laslett: The true founder of Notting Hill Carnival".

At the Notting Hill Carnival in 2026, two billboards honouring Laslett and Claudia Jones were unveiled on the carnival route.
