= Reggae Geel =

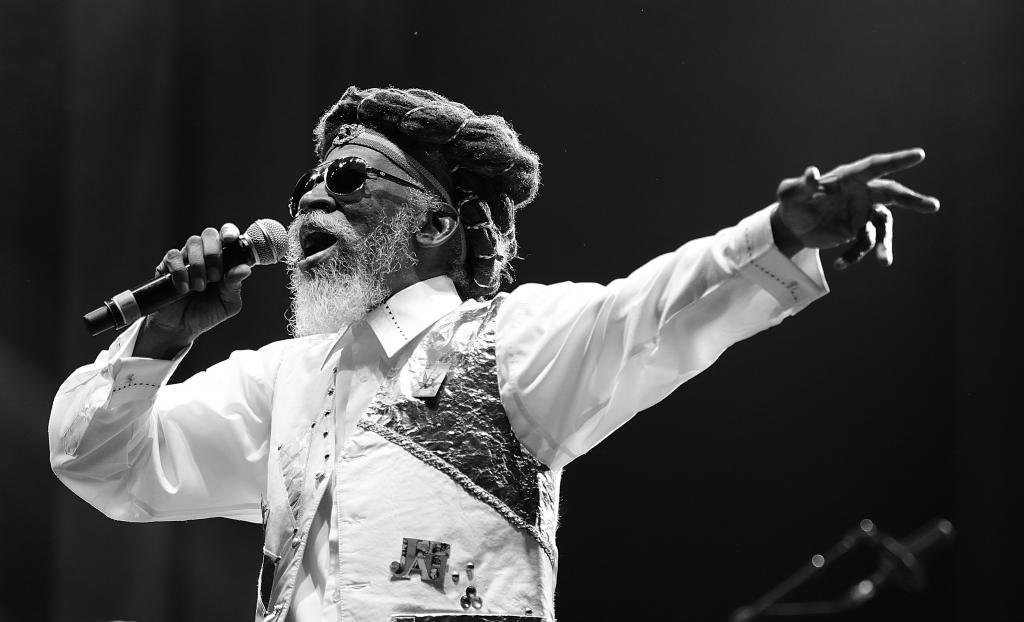
- Bunny Wailer at Reggae Geel 2014
- Genre: Reggae
- Dates: August
- Locations: Geel, Belgium
- Years active: 1979–present
- Website: www.reggaegeel.com

Reggae Geel (Flemish: [ˈrɛɣeː ˈɣeːl]) is a reggae music festival that takes place in Geel, Belgium, typically on the first Friday of August, with reggae deejays and sound systems, followed by the main festival on the following Saturday. Reggae Geel is the oldest Reggae festival in Europe. It is particularly well known for its relaxed, non-commercial atmosphere and considered by many artists as the most Jamaican-like reggae festival outside Jamaica.

== Line-up of Reggae Geel ==
=== 1979-1980s ===
==== 1979 ====
- Disco Brabo

==== 1980 ====
- Disco Brabo

==== 1981 ====
- Sugar Charlie & Jah Shakespear

==== 1982 ====
- Sugar Charlie & Jah Shakespear

==== 1983 ====
- Mighty 4 & The Rebels

==== 1984 ====
- Sugar Charlie & Jah Shakespear

==== 1985 ====
- Sugar Charlie & Jah Shakespear

==== 1986 ====
- Black Slate & Keith Drummond

==== 1987 ====
- Big Boatsia

==== 1988 ====
- Desmond Dekker and The Aces

==== 1989 ====
- Macka B ft Sugar Charlie & Jah Shakespear

=== 1990s ===
==== 1990 ====
- Rootsdaughter Showcase ft. Natasha
- Claudette Boney
- Miss Irie
- Sandra Cross
- Ranking Ann
- Aisha
- Crucial Robbie ft The Robotiks

==== 1991 ====
- Allan Kingpin
- U-Roy ft. The Robotiks
- Sugar Charlie & Jah Shakespear

==== 1992 ====
- Jah Shaka
- Yamie Bolo
- Willi Williams
- Horace Andy ft. The Fasimbas
- Sugar Charlie

==== 1993 ====
- Donette Forte & Riddim of Resistance
- MC Tollah
- Vivian Jones
- General Levy & Michael Prophet ft. Ricky Tuff and The Ruff Cutt Band

==== 1994 ====
- Tena Stelin & Band
- Half Pint & Johnny Clarke feat. The Ruff Cutt Band
- United Dub Sound
- Ruffneck
- Blacka T
- Sugar Charlie
- Jah Shaky

==== 1995 ====
- Panache Culture
- Toyin Adekale
- Starkey Banton & Kingsounds
- Bob Marley Recording Studio Showcase ft. Desi D
- Captain Morgan and Echo
- Daktari Sound
- Ras Bors
- Ragga Yves
- Dennis World
- Spots Road Show
- Juc a Come
- Freedom Sounds International

==== 1996 ====
- Jah Music International
- Jazz Jamaica
- Steven Wright and The Rite Vibe
- Junior Delgado & Augustus Pablo
- King Shiloh
- Ruffnek
- Armagedeon
- Mannaseh Hifi and Jah Vibemaster
- Jus A Come
- The London Dub Club Arena

==== 1997 ====
- The Amharic High Power Survival
- Jetstar Jumbo
- Lincoln Thompson & Royall Rasses
- Jahpostles
- Everton Blender
- Anthony B
- Jet Star
- Jus a Come
- King Shiloh ft. The Majestic Warriors
- RDK Hifi

==== 1998 ====
- Live Redemption
- Holland feat. Survival Hi Powa
- Spotsroadshow vs. Boombastic & Back II Bass
- Rasites
- Levi Roots
- Rohan Lee
- Ijahman Levi and Band
- Earl Sixteen
- Max Romeo
- Michael Rose ft Mafia & Fluxy
- Festus (Coxsone Outernational)
- Winnyman
- Jah Sound International
- Muzik Street Twin Spin

==== 1999 ====
- Killamanjaro
- Ragga Yves & Trancelators
- Far West Crew
- Jah Sound International
- Levi Roots
- AbbaKush
- Twinkle Brothers
- Harry Chapman
- Yabby You
- Frankie Paul
- Jah Mali
- Ras Angels
- Ras Messengers
- Die Anarchistische Abendunterhaltung Dubwise
- Robbo Ranks
- Music Street Spin
- Jah Youth
- Nyabinghi international
- Bass Culture
- Bong Productions
- Greenshen
- Back O Wall
- Homeless

=== 2000s ===
==== 2000 ====
- Freddie McGregor & Ruff Cutt Band
- Barrington Levy
- Sugar Minott
- Bim Sherman Unplugged
- Gentleman & The Killing Riddim Section ft Tippa Irie
- Aisha
- Thriller
- Jenna
- Jayzik
- Starkey Banton
- Chukki Star
- Al Campbell
- Jah Sound International
- Bodyguard
- Pow Pow Movement
- Lord Kossity
- Godfather Crew
- King Shiloh
- Channel One

==== 2001 ====
- Stone Love Movement
- Far West Crew
- Uman & Band
- Max Romeo ft Tribu Acoustica
- Prezident Brown
- Alton Ellis & The All Welcome Band
- Leroy Gibbons
- Jah Mason
- Lloyd Brown
- Panache Culture
- Fredlocks
- Shinehead & Dub Asante Band
- Calabash
- Ablas Solo & Exile Vibration
- Dantan Humble & The Humble Ones
- Winnieman
- Ragga Ragga
- Red Alert
- Back II Bass
- Runn Sound
- Small Axe
- Homeless

==== 2002 ====
- Bong Productions
- Massive Sound
- Live Easy
- Soul Rebels
- Anthony B
- Bushman
- Admiral Bailey
- Crucial P
- Masiles
- Taffari & The Revolution Band
- Rude Rich & The High Notes
- Rasites
- Massive Sound
- Raggamuffin Whiteman
- Synes Movement
- Civalizee Foundation
- Bass Culture
- Red Alert
- TLP and Dors
- Far West Crew

==== 2003 ====
- Sly & Robbie ft Michael Rose
- Junior Reid & One Blood Band
- T.O.K.
- David Rodigan
- Nyahbingi drummers
- Original Uman
- Rodigan ft. Coppaface
- Eric Judah
- Bubblegum
- Factor X
- Ragga Yves
- Raggamuffin Whiteman & Sista G
- 3T & Sista Nele
- ROC ft. Calabash
- Blessing by the drummers of Nyabinghi Mika & General Dub Progress
- The Internationals
- Queen Omega and Sista Band
- LMS
- Soulstereo
- Bong Productions
- Flash it up
- TLP & Dors
- Ashanti 3000 feat. Dread Pressure
- Lion I Charjan & TD Ranking
- Drummer of Nyabinghi
- Thalita Gospel Choir
- Jamaican Comedy

==== 2004 ====
- Cocoa Tea ft Crisinti
- Robert Lee
- Marcia Griffiths
- Beres Hammond
- Panache Culture
- Sound System Selector
- Tony Matterhorn
- Ward 21
- Far West Crew
- Uphill Sound
- Uhuru Sound
- Crucial P
- Sanchez & Lloyd Brown
- Iley Dread and Genie Slick
- Massive Sound
- Civalizee Foundation
- Synex Movement
- Bassment Sound
- Juggling Discothèque
- High Grade Sound
- Ion Youth Warrior

==== 2005 ====
- Luciano
- Marcia Griffiths
- T.O.K.
- Cecile
- Gentleman
- Skatroniks
- Black Kat
- High Grade
- Far West Crew
- Bong Productions
- Kings of Swing
- Selvie Wonder & Lion I
- King Shiloh
- Jah Youth
- Skatroniks
- Willi Williams
- Bass Culture
- Boom A Ranks
- Cool Rock ft. Jahva Sound
- Uruhu Sound
- Skylarking
- Kings of Swing
- Civalizee Foundation
- King Shiloh
- Jah Shaka

==== 2006 ====
- Ricky Chaplin
- Cornell Campbell ft Mafia & Fluxie
- Jah Mali ft Artikal Band
- Linval Thompson & The Ruff Coat
- The Congos & Band
- Tappa Zukie
- Prince Jazzbo
- Sister Carol
- Original Red Alert
- TLP & Dors
- Metromedia ft. Skyjuice
- Soundquake ft. Million Stylez
- Jah Tubby's Worldsystem
- Channel One Soundsystem
- Empress Ayeola
- Ricky Chaplin
- Burro Banton
- Tristan Palmerautt Band
- Crucial P
- Bong Productions
- Civalizee Foundation
- Ivory Sound
- NSG Sound
- North Venice Crew
- Skylarking
- Uphill
- U-Brown ft Maffia & Fluxie Soundsystem
- Ashanti 3000 ft. Dread Pressure
- Soul Remedy Soundsystem ft. Kenny Knots and Earl 16

==== 2007 ====
- Macka B
- Yellowman
- Junior Kelly ft Perfect
- The Disciples
- Derrick Morgan ft Rude Rich & The High Notes
- Prince Malachi
- Stitchie
- The Mighty Pirates
- High Grade Sound
- Jamrock Sound ft. DJ Waxfiend & Shyrock
- The Originators of Dancehall ft. Brigadeer Jerry
- Ranking Joe and All Campbell
- Bass Odyssey
- Forward Fever
- Vibronics
- Abassi Hi Power
- Sun is Shining
- Massive Sound
- Far West Crew
- Lone Ranger
- Manasseh & MC Danny Red
- The Disciples & MC Jonah Dan

==== 2008 ====
- Alpha Blondy & The Solar System
- Horace Andy
- Alborosie & Spiritual
- Bity McClean
- Omar Perry
- Zion Train
- Mad Professor
- Dub Front Association
- Black Scorpio Soundsystem ft. Echo Minott & Lord Sassafras
- King Sturgav Soundsystem ft. U-Roy
- Charlie Chaplin
- Josey Wales & Brigadeer Jerry
- Iration Steppas
- Pura Vida Productionz
- Abashanti
- Rootman J and The Zionyouth Crew
- Uman
- Bong Productions
- Civalizee Foundation
- Jugglin’ Discothèque
- Ivory Sound

==== 2009 ====
- Lee Perry
- Anthony B
- Chakademus & Pliers
- Cocoa Tea
- Lady Saw
- African Head Charge
- Adrian Sherwood
- Turbulence
- Glen Washington
- Don Carlos
- Dubvision Band
- Ziggi
- Renaissance Band
- Topcat
- Lady G
- Bush Chemists
- King General
- Culture Freeman
- Alpha & Omega
- Dan I
- Pow Fox
- Jean Binta
- Breeze
- Onesty
- Myband
- Makalox
- Blackmann
- Brother Culture
- Saimn I
- Young Warriorebbe Sound
- Rata Chanters
- Jah Free
- Ashanti 3000
- Unlisted Fanatic
- Civalizee Foundation
- Downbeat The Ruler
- Pow Pow Movement
- Raggamuffin' Whiteman
- Mystic Breeze Collective
- Chaka Chaka Sound
- High Grade Sound
- The Skaravans

=== 2010s ===
==== 2010 ====
- Bunny Wailer & The Solomonic Reggaestra
- Toots & The Maytals
- Tarrus Riley & The Black Soil Band
- Mavado
- Israel Vibration
- Lutan Fyah
- Busy Signal
- Inna De Yard
- Kiddus I
- Cedric Myton
- Clinton Fearon
- Derajah
- Matthew Mcanuff
- Earl Smith
- Louie Culture
- Pura Vida
- Stone Love Movement
- Duke Vin & Natty Bo
- King Addies
- King Earthquake Soundsystem
- Benjamin Zaphaniah
- Fatman International
- Kanka
- Biga
- Blackboard Jungle
- David Katz
- Anthony John
- Slimmah Sound
- Lyrical Benjie
- Christine Miller
- Silly Walks Discothèque
- Kingstone Sound
- Groove Station
- Silverbullet Sound
- Beatstreet Sound
- Boing Productions
- Professor Cat
- High'r Ites
- Saimn
- T-Fyah

== See also ==
- List of reggae festivals
- Reggae
