= Red Bull Culture Clash =

Sound clash event hosted by Red Bull

Red Bull Culture Clash is an indoor sound clash event hosted by Red Bull. The event is inspired by Jamaican sound system culture, where four crews compete against each other in genre-bending musical competition. Each crew is allocated their own stage in various corners of the venue, engaging in a four to five-round battle featuring genres such as hyper-pop, reggaeton, hardcore, hip-hop, and more. The teams unleash heavy tunes, unreleased tracks, and surprise guests, vying to outshine their opponents and win over the crowd. The distinctive aspect of this event is that the ultimate winner is determined by the volume of crowd response, making it a thrilling and interactive experience for both crews and audience alike.

== Crews ==
- 2010 - February: Metalheadz (winners), Soul II Soul, Trojan Soundsystem, Digital Mystikz.
- 2010 - October: Metalheadz, Skream and Benga, Soul Jazz, Channel One (winners).
- 2012: Channel One, Major Lazer, Boy Better Know (winners), Annie Mac (ft Magnetic Man, Redlight, Disclosure and Rudimental)
- 2013 [New York]: Just Blaze & Young Guru, Federation Sound, Que Bajo?!, Trouble & Bass (winners)
- 2014: [London] Rebel Sound (Chase & Status, David Rodigan, Shy FX and MC Rage) (winners), Boy Better Know, A$AP Mob, Stone Love Movement, Euphoria
- 2016: Mixpak (winners), Wiz Khalifa & Taylor Gang, UKG Allstars, Eskimo Dance (Grime acts hosted by Wiley)
- 2017: [Atlanta]: Eardrummers ft. Mike Will Made-It, Unruly (winners), Disturbing London ft. Tinie Tempah, Enjoylife ft. Wondagurl
- 2018: [Berlin]: Jugglerz, Betty Ford Boys, Die Achse, Revolution No 5
- 2022: [Los Angeles]: Recreo, Gasolina, Subsuelo, The Do-Over
- 2022: [New York]: Half Moon, Club Cringe, Apocalipsis, CORPUS
- 2025: [London]: Homegrown with Jyoty, Native Soundsystem with Kenny Allstar, Spice Army with Spice & Voice of the Streets with Teezee

Tickets here

More information here

== History ==
Founded in 2010, with a hiatus in 2015, the event is billed as "the world's biggest musical battle." In 2014, the event was attended by 20,000 people, with 30,000 anticipated in 2016.

In 2017, Red Bull Culture Clash took place in Atlanta, GA. The four competing teams included the Eardrummers led by Mike Will Made-It, Disturbing London with Tinie Tempah, Enjoylife headed by Wondagurl, and Unruly featuring Popcaan. As a special guest, the well-known hip-hop artist Rae Sremmurd joined the Eardrummers' performance.

The following year, the event returned to Atlanta, GA, at the venue 787 Windsor. The event showcased four crews: Zaytoven with Zaytown Global, Mija & Kenny Beats with Don't Think, Kranium with Frequent Flyers, and Fuego with Fireboy Sound.

Red Bull Culture Clash returned to the United States in 2022. On May 19 in Brooklyn, fans enjoyed an electrifying clash of hyper-pop, reggaeton, hardcore, and hip-hop, courtesy of New York City's diverse underground nightlife scenes. Four crews faced off to determine the ultimate champion:

- Apocalipsis featuring Riobamba, Dana Lu, Bembona, LITA, Nino Augustine, Dos Flakos, and JFuse.
- Club Cringe featuring DJ Trick, DJ Fuck, Mother Cell, and Angel Money.
- CORPUS featuring Show Me The Body, Bearcat, and Tripp Jones.
- Half Moon featuring Dickbyair, Khalil, Sounds of Reality, and DJ Will Gates.

Then, on June 24, the Red Bull Culture Clash descended upon Los Angeles to celebrate the Latinx musical diaspora across various iconic genres. Legendary LA party crews went head-to-head, competing to win over the crowd:

- The Do Over featuring Tony Touch.
- Gasolina featuring Luny Tunes, DJ Playero, DJ Blass, and Oplus.
- Recreo featuring Milkman, Sky Rompiendo, and Alvaro Diaz.
- Subsuelo featuring Ape Drums and Los Rakas.
