= Sentinel Sound =

Sentinel
- Also known as: The Everlasting Sound
- Origin: Stuttgart, Germany
- Genres: Reggae, dancehall
- Years active: 1998 – present
- Members: Elmar; Nadia; Mario; Uli; Bongsi
- Past members: Meska; Shotta Paul; Thilo
- Website: www.sentinelsound.de

Sentinel is a reggae and dancehall sound system from Stuttgart, Germany, best known for winning the 2005 World Clash in Brooklyn, New York.

== Clashes ==
- Kill Or Be Killed 2001 - Sentinel vs Supersonic vs Wadada vs Budadub - Köln
- Riddim Clash 2003 - Sentinel vs Black Kat vs Killamanjaro vs Downbeat - München
- Sentinel vs Turboforce - Middleton, Jamaica, 2003
- Sentinel vs Soundquake - Erlangen, 2004
- World Clash NYC 2005 - Sentinel vs. Black Kat vs. Bass Odyssey vs. Mighty Crown vs. Desert Storm vs. Immortal
- World Clash NYC 2006 - Sentinel vs. Black Kat vs. Bass Odyssey vs. Black Reaction vs. Sound Trooper
- UK Cup Clash 2006 - Bass Odyssey vs. Sound Trooper vs. Sentinel vs. King Tubbys vs. LP International vs. XTC 4x4
- Sentinel vs. Sound Trooper 2007, New York, USA (no winner declared)
- Riddim Clash 2007 - David Rodigan vs. Sentinel vs. Black Scorpio, Düsseldorf
- World Clash NYC 2007 - Sentinel vs. Black Kat vs. Bass Odyssey vs. Mighty Crown vs. Rebel Tone (no show)
- UK Cup Clash 2008 - The Final Conflict - Sentinel vs. Black Kat vs. Bass Odyssey vs. Mighty Crown vs. Tony Matterhorn vs. David Rodigan vs. Killamanjaro
- War Territory 2008 - Sentinel vs. One Love - Mailand, Italy, 2008
- Sound Fi Dead 2008 - Sentinel vs. Synemaxx vs. Black kat vs. Silverstar vs. Killamanjaro, Elderslie, Jamaica
- War Inna East 2009 - Sentinel & Supersonic vs. Tek 9 & Poison Dart, Enschede, the Netherlands
- War Territory 2009 - Bass Odyssey vs. Sentinel, Mailand, Italy
- Sound Fi Dead 2009 - Synemaxx vs. Black Kat vs. Sentinel vs. Black Blunt vs. Sound Trooper, Elderslie, Jamaica
- US World Clash vs. UK Cup Clash 2010 - Mighty Crown & Sentinel & Black Kat & Killamanjaro vs. David Rodigan & One Love & Bass Odyssey & Tony Matterhorn
- Death Before Dishonor 2010 - Mighty Crown vs. Tony Matterhorn (no show) vs. Bredda Hype vs. Sentinel vs. Black Kat vs. Bass Odyssey, Montego Bay, Jamaica
- The Real Deal 2010 - X-Caliber vs. Sentinel vs. Tek 9, Port-of-Spain, Trinidad
- Sound Fi Dead 2010 - Tek 9 vs. Black Scorpio vs. Sentinel vs. Black Kat vs. Bodyguard vs. Sound Trooper (last three no-show)
