= Bulgarians in the United Kingdom =

Total population
- Bulgarian-born residents Bulgarian-born residents in the United Kingdom: 160,513 (2021/22 Census)^{a} England: 146,896 (2021); Scotland: 6,162 (2022); Wales: 3,358 (2021); Northern Ireland: 4,097 (2021)

Regions with significant populations
- London (Haringey, Waltham Forest, Enfield), Medway, Leicester

Languages
- Bulgarian, English

Religion
- Bulgarian Orthodox Church, Islam, Irreligion, Atheism

Related ethnic groups
- Bulgarian diaspora

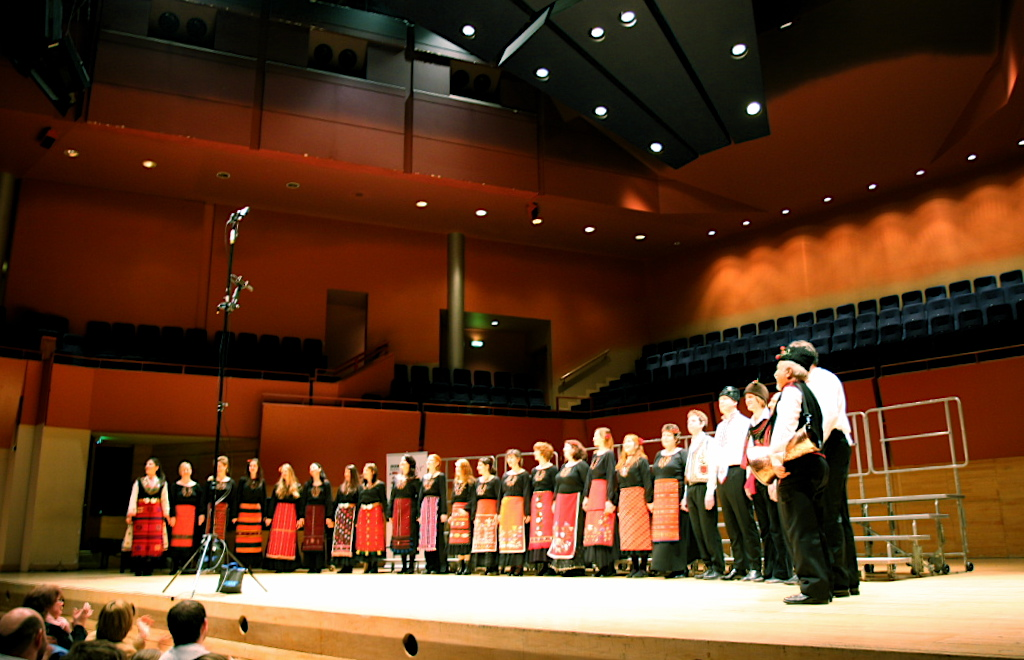
The London Bulgarian Choir on stage

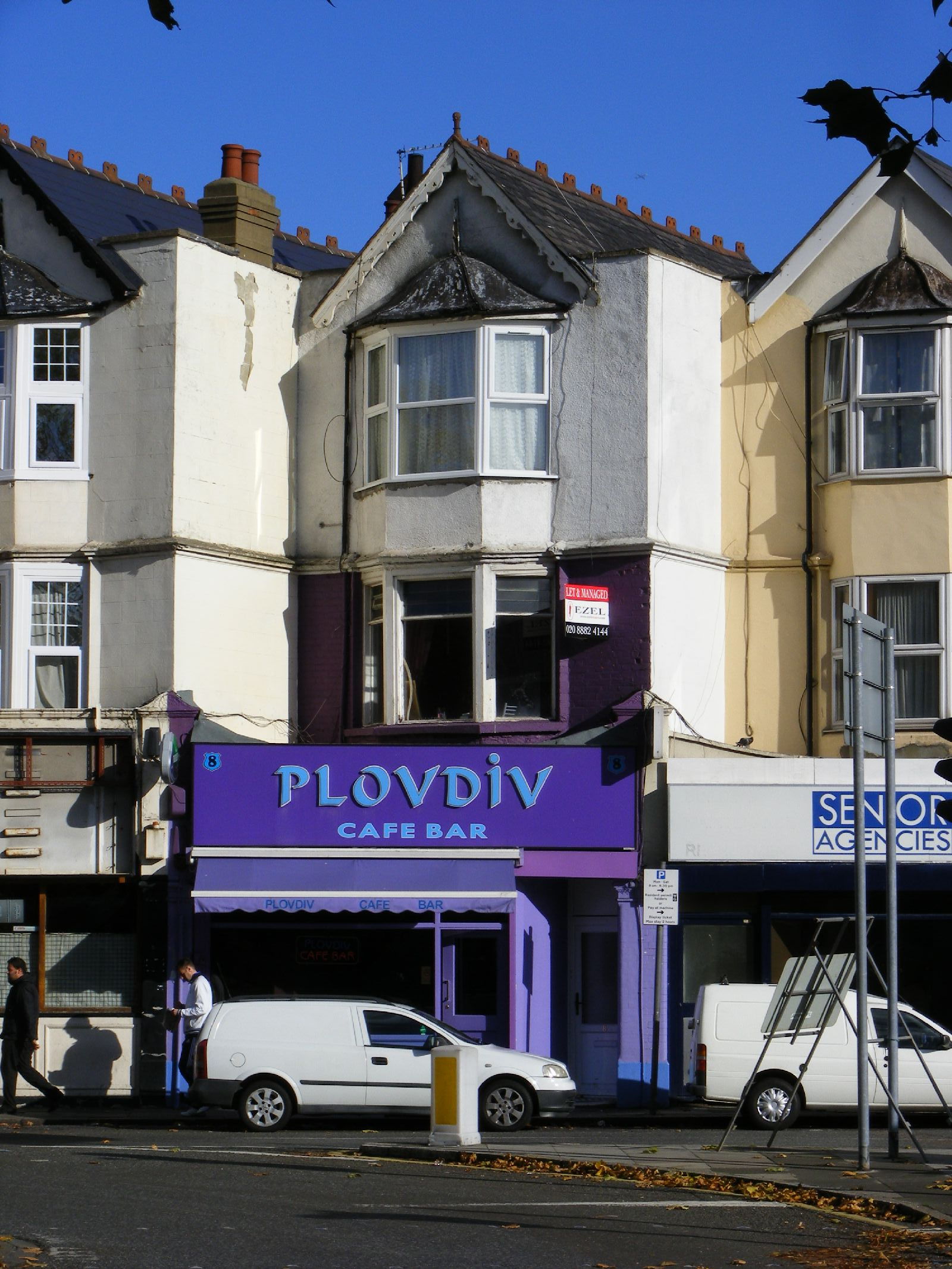
The Plovdiv Bulgarian Café in Haringey, London

Bulgarians in the United Kingdom (Bulgarian: Българи в Обединеното кралство, romanized: Balgari v Obedinenoto kralstvo) include citizens of the United Kingdom who trace their Bulgarian ancestry. The number of Bulgarian-born people resident in the UK has risen from 5,351 at the time of the 2001 Census to an estimated 103,000 in 2018.

From 1 January 2014 until Brexit, Bulgarians had freedom of movement and work in the United Kingdom as citizens of the European Union.

== History ==
A true Bulgarian community in the United Kingdom was formed relatively recently as compared to Bulgarian communities in other countries in Western Europe. Few Bulgarian students enrolled at British universities before World War II; political and economic emigration was also scarce. It was only around 1944–1945 that a more apparent circle of Bulgarian political emigrants was formed in the United Kingdom.

During the Cold War, when Bulgaria was a socialist state known as the People's Republic of Bulgaria (1944–1989), the Bulgarian community in the United Kingdom numbered some 3,000–4,000, mostly in England. Emigration to the United Kingdom was very active in the 1990s and 2000s. By 2000, the Bulgarian community numbered over 10,000 according to unofficial data. Other estimates from the early 21st century claim over 30,000 Bulgarians live permanently or temporarily (as students and workers) in the capital London alone. The 2001 UK Census recorded 5,351 people born in Bulgaria.

When Bulgaria joined the European Union in January 2007, the British government placed transitional restrictions on the rights of Bulgarians to move to the UK, which were subsequently extended and these transitional restrictions expired on 1 January 2014. The Office for National Statistics estimates that 69,000 Bulgarian-born immigrants were resident in the UK in 2015. By 2018, this estimate had risen to 103,000.

== Notable people ==
- Elizaveta Karamihailova, physicist
- Dobrinka Tabakova, composer
- Paul Dickov (b. 1972), Scottish footballer
- Boncho Genchev (b. 1964), footballer, first Bulgarian in the Premier League, currently residing in London
- Stanislav Ianevski (b. 1985), actor
- Georgi Markov (1929–1978), dissident writer
- Gerri Peev, journalist
- Silvena Rowe, chef
- Dimitar Berbatov (b. 1981) (footballer) former Tottenham Hotspur, Manchester United and Fulham player

== See also ==
- Bulgarian diaspora
- London Bulgarian Choir
- Bulgaria–United Kingdom relations
- Immigration to the United Kingdom
