= Halo 4 Original Soundtrack =

Soundtrack album by Neil Davidge
- Released: October 19, 2012 (Vol. 1); April 8, 2013 (Vol. 2)
- Studios: Abbey Road Studios and Angel Recording Studios in London; Newman Scoring Stage in Los Angeles
- Genre: Video game soundtrack
- Length: 77:56 (Vol. 1); 81:44 (Vol. 2)
- Label: 7Hz Productions
- Producer: Neil Davidge

Neil Davidge chronology
Push Movie Soundtrack (2009)	Halo 4 Original Soundtrack (2012)	Slo Light (2014)

The Halo 4 Original Soundtrack is the official soundtrack to the first-person shooter video game Halo 4, developed by 343 Industries and published by Microsoft Studios. British record producer Neil Davidge was Halo 4's main composer and producer. The soundtrack was released on October 19, 2012 in Australia and New Zealand, and October 22 everywhere else. A second volume containing more of the score was released digitally on April 8, 2013.

Davidge was a Halo fan who was honored to have the chance to write music for the games. Drawing inspiration from the game's concept art and other visuals, he began writing music for the game in December 2010. Davidge described his music as an evolution of previous Halo music, designed to accompany the new style of the universe.

Critical reception to Halo 4's music and the soundtrack was highly positive. However, its stylistic departure from earlier Halo music composed by Martin O'Donnell was divisive. The album debuted the No. 50 on the Billboard 200 chart in the United States, making it the highest-charting game soundtrack ever at the time. Ultimately eclipsed by the BTS World: Original Soundtrack (debuted at No. 26) and Clair Obscur: Expedition 33 (Original Soundtrack) (No. 29), it remains one of only three game soundtracks to have reached the Top 50 since the Billboard 200 began publishing weekly in March 1956.

== Background ==
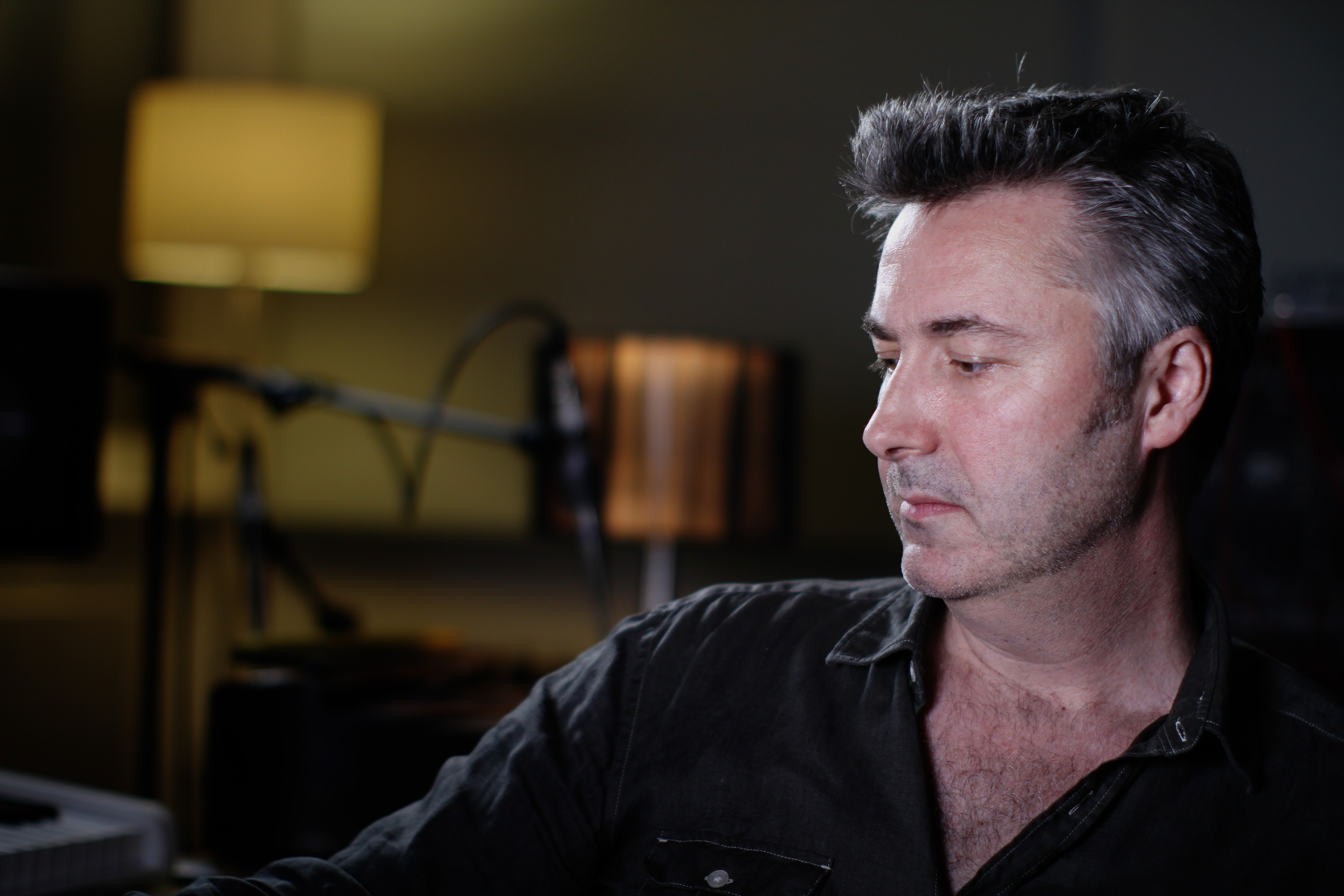
Composer Neil Davidge

The majority of previous Halo soundtracks had been composed by Martin O'Donnell, Michael Salvatori, and the Bungie audio team; Stephen Rippy composed the music for the spinoff game Halo Wars. Davidge is best known for his work as a co-writer and producer for Massive Attack, and has also composed the scores for a number of films.

Halo 4 audio director Sotaro Tojima began looking for the game's composer in 2010. "I had a vision for the overall Halo 4 music production that I think of as 'Digital and Organic'," he wrote—"something very much inspired by the game script." This vision led him to explore electronica and dance music to find his chosen sound. Tojima decided on Davidge after a year's search. 343 Industries officially named Davidge as Halo 4's main composer on April 11, 2012; by that point the name of Halo 4's composer had been kept a secret for fifteen months.

Davidge is a longtime Halo fan; he would play Combat Evolved during downtime while producing Massive Attack albums in 2001. Davidge credits the games with providing a heroic story that reminded him of his youth reading comic books. "I'd love to be able to inspire people [like Halo does]," he said. Davidge flew to Seattle, Washington in December 2010 to meet 343 Industries personnel. Afterwards he began writing concept and prototype music for the project before being officially engaged in July or August 2011.

Davidge initially thought that scoring the video game would be similar to the process for a film; "Pretty soon I discovered the similarities were few," he later told Rolling Stone, since music for the game had to dynamically change its length and composition depending on player actions. Much of Halo 4's music was written on guitar or piano; at home, Davidge would sometimes sing melodies into a dictaphone for later transcription. While composing, he viewed slideshow images and visual material to influence his work. Davidge played through unfinished portions of the game for inspiration; he ended up using the game's development concept art as inspiration for his music.

While Davidge professed himself as a huge fan of O'Donnell's work, he felt the music needed to change to fit the new trilogy. "The phrase that kept going around was 'evolution not revolution' of the score," he said. "[They wanted a] more electronic, slightly more beat-driven direction, which is one reason why they came to me. They wanted to flesh out, sonically, a new universe. One that they could expand on in subsequent sequels.”

== Recording ==
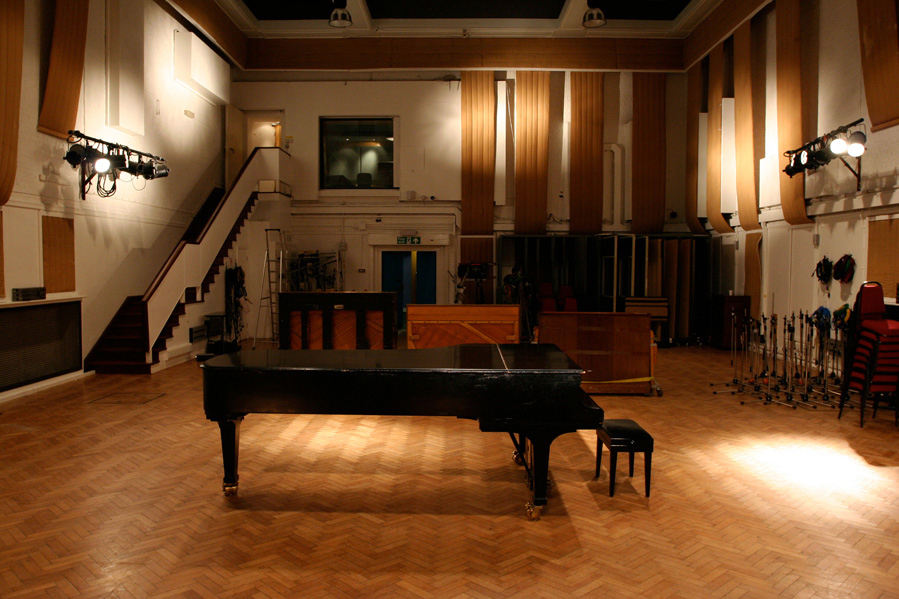
Parts of Halo 4's score were recorded at Abbey Road Studios.

Recording of much of the soundtrack took place at Abbey Road Studios and Angel Recording Studios, both situated in London, United Kingdom. Davidge and his production team enlisted the 50-piece Chamber Orchestra of London, as well as 26 male and female vocalists and other performers.

Track 12, "117", was composed by Kazuma Jinnouchi and performed by the Hollywood Studio Symphony. Recording took place at 20th Century Fox's Newman Scoring Stage in Los Angeles, United States.

== Release ==
Release history of Halo 4 Original Soundtrack Volume 1
Region	Date	Label	Format
Australia	October 19, 2012	7Hz/Sony Music	CD, digital
New Zealand	October 19, 2012	7Hz/Sony Music	CD, digital
Europe	October 22, 2012	7Hz/Essential	CD, digital
Japan	October 22, 2012	7Hz/Essential	CD, digital
United States	October 22, 2012	7Hz/The End/RED	CD, digital
Canada	October 22, 2012	7Hz/The End/RED	CD, digital
South America	October 22, 2012	7Hz/The End/RED	CD, digital
Worldwide	November 6, 2012	7Hz/Sony Music/Essential/The End/RED	double CD

The original soundtrack was released in physical and digital formats. Customers who purchased the physical compact disc received a free download voucher for remixes and additional music that are not included in the soundtrack but featured in-game. A limited edition two-disc box set was also released featuring both the Halo 4 Original Soundtrack and Halo 4 Original Soundtrack Remixes as well as a DVD featuring over 70 minutes of behind the scenes footage from Abbey Road Studios. A special digital edition is available which features the soundtrack and six tracks from the remix album.

On October 3, 2012, 343 Industries announced that they would be holding a Halo 4 Soundtrack Remix Contest. The competition took place from October 3, 2012, until October 29, 2012; participants could use samples from the tracks "Awakening", "To Galaxy", and "Revival" and submit their own remixes. Entries were judged by Davidge, Tojima, and music producers Caspa and Sander van Doorn. Participants of the winning entries received prizes, including the Xbox 360 Limited Edition Halo 4 console bundle, the Halo 4 Original Soundtrack itself and many more.

On October 3, 2012, it was also announced that the release date for the special limited edition box set version would be pushed to November 6, 2012, to coincide with the release date of the game; this was due to an exclusive content reveal. On December 4, 2012, Halo 4 Original Soundtrack Remixes was released digitally.

Halo 4 Original Soundtrack Volume 2 was released digitally on April 8, 2013.

== Reception ==
Professional ratings
Review scores
Source	Rating
Allmusic	3.5/5 stars

In the United States, the album debuted at No. 50 on the Billboard 200 chart, becoming the highest video game soundtrack to peak on the chart. During the first week, it sold nearly 9,000 units.

Critical reception to the music and soundtrack was generally positive. James Wargacki, writing for Electronic Gaming Monthly, summed up the soundtrack and the remix album as "a fun and enjoyable collection of songs", with Davidge's work introducing new elements to the series while harking back to classic themes. Gaming Age's Dustin Chadwell appreciated that Davidge avoided retreading old material in the series and wrote a "unique" soundtrack for the release with several standout tracks. Francesca Reyes of Official Xbox Magazine wrote that many areas of Halo 4 was highly polished, including the score; "the music by new composer Neil Davidge combines orchestrated swells with subtle electronic blips and bleeps to great effect."

Ryan McCaffrey of IGN wrote that while it was a wise choice for Microsoft to move in a different direction than O'Donnell's style, "the results [were] mixed"; Davidge's "atmospheric" compositions were not memorable in McCaffrey's estimation, and complemented the action rather than adding to it.

The soundtrack for Halo 4 was nominated in the category for Best Original Score at the 2012 Inside Gaming Awards and the 2012 Spike Video Game Awards.

== Track listing ==
=== Volume 1 ===
All music is composed by Neil Davidge except where noted.

Halo 4 Original Soundtrack
No.	Title	Composer	Length
1.	"Awakening"		5:41
2.	"Belly of the Beast"		2:39
3.	"Requiem"		2:16
4.	"Legacy"		2:29
5.	"Faithless"		5:02
6.	"Haven"		5:45
7.	"Nemesis"		3:31
8.	"Ascendancy"		4:20
9.	"Solace"		4:45
10.	"To Galaxy"		4:58
11.	"Immaterial"		7:33
12.	"117"	Kazuma Jinnouchi	7:29
13.	"Arrival"		5:37
14.	"Revival"		7:19
15.	"Green and Blue"		7:59
Total length:			77:56

Halo 4 Original Soundtrack Special Digital Edition bonus tracks
No.	Title	Length
16.	"Awakening" (Gui Boratto remix)	7:22
17.	"To Galaxy" (Sander van Doorn & Julian Jordan remix)	6:46
18.	"Ascendancy" (Caspa remix)	3:53
19.	"Revival" (DJ Skee & THX remix)	3:35
20.	"Requiem" (Bobby Tank remix)	5:34
21.	"The Beauty of Cortana" (Apocalyptica vs. Neil Davidge remix)	5:08

Halo 4 Original Soundtrack Remixes
No.	Title	Length
1.	"Awakening" (Gui Boratto remix)	7:24
2.	"Green and Blue" (KOAN Sound remix)	4:02
3.	"Requiem" (Bobby Tank remix)	5:36
4.	"Ascendancy" (Caspa remix)	3:55
5.	"To Galaxy" (Sander van Doorn & Julian Jordan remix)	6:48
6.	"Haven" (Hundred Waters remix)	4:22
7.	"Revival" (DJ Skee & THX remix)	3:37
8.	"Ascendancy" (Matt Lange remix)	5:04
9.	"Nemesis" (Alvin Risk remix)	4:39
10.	"Solace" (Maor Levi remix)	7:17
11.	"Arrival" (Norin & Rad remix)	4:00
12.	"Green and Blue" (Andrew Bayer remix)	3:24
13.	"Foreshadow" (James Iha remix)	2:51
14.	"The Beauty of Cortana" (Apocalyptica vs. Neil Davidge remix)	5:08

=== Volume 2 ===
Halo 4 Original Soundtrack Volume 2
No.	Title	Composer	Length
1.	"Atonement"	Kazuma Jinnouchi	3:16
2.	"Gravity"	Kazuma Jinnouchi	2:09
3.	"Wreckage"	Kazuma Jinnouchi	3:24
4.	"Aliens"	Neil Davidge	5:31
5.	"Kantele Bow"	Neil Davidge	4:04
6.	"Pylons"	Neil Davidge	5:39
7.	"Escape"	Neil Davidge	3:57
8.	"Swamp"	Neil Davidge	2:49
9.	"Push Through"	Neil Davidge	4:44
10.	"Convoy"	Neil Davidge	4:44
11.	"To Galaxy" (Extended)	Neil Davidge	7:04
12.	"Lasky’s Theme"	Kazuma Jinnouchi	3:55
13.	"Foreshadow"	Neil Davidge	3:34
14.	"Cloud City"	Neil Davidge	4:35
15.	"This Armour"	Neil Davidge	4:47
16.	"Intruders"	Kazuma Jinnouchi	3:39
17.	"Mantis"	Kazuma Jinnouchi	4:02
18.	"Sacrifice"	Kazuma Jinnouchi	3:02
19.	"Never Forget" (Midnight Version)	Kazuma Jinnouchi	4:37
20.	"Majestic"	Kazuma Jinnouchi	2:12
Total length:			81:44

== Charts ==
Chart (2012)	Peak position
U.S. Billboard 200	50
U.S. Billboard Top Independent Albums	10
U.S. Billboard Top Soundtracks	3

== Personnel ==
All information taken from the compact disc liner notes.

Production and Technical

- Neil Davidge – composer, producer
- Davidge, Andrew Morgan – arrangements, programming, additional production and orchestration
- Kazuma Jinnouchi – composer, "117"
- Nobuko Toda – Orchestration, Score Producer " 117"
- Matt Dunkley – orchestration and arrangements
- Jeremy Holland Smith – additional arrangements, "Librarian" & "Green and Blue"
- Gaetan Schurrer – additional programming
- Andry Bradfield, Jeremy Wheatley – mixing
- Davidge, Niall Ascott, Marco Migliari, Paul Walton – additional mixing
- Marco Migliari – engineering and technical support
- Paul Chessell – artwork design

343 Industries

- Sotaro "Tajeen" Tojima – music director
- Kazuma Jinnouchi – music supervision, additional music
- Ken Kato – executive audio producer

Recording

- Dakota Music – copyists
- Geoff Foster – orchestral and choir recordings engineer
- Lewis Jones, Paul Pritchard, Matt Mysko, Chris Parker, Rupert Coulson – assistant engineers
- Matt Dunkley – The Chamber Orchestra of London conductor
- Claire Tchaikowski – female vocal, vocal arrangements on "Legacy", "Awakening", "Solace"
- Dessislava Stefanova – female vocal, conductor for The London Bulgarian Choir
- The London Bulgarian Choir – female choir vocals

== See also ==
- Halo 4: Forward Unto Dawn
