= Pampidoo =

Jamaican reggae and dancehall deejay

- Also known as: Pompidou, Pompidoo
- Origin: Greenwich Farm, Kingston, Jamaica
- Genres: Ragga, dancehall
- Occupations: Musician, songwriter, deejay
- Instrument: Vocals
- Years active: 1984–present
- Labels: Jammy's, Freedom Sounds, Striker Lee

Pampidoo is a Jamaican reggae and dancehall deejay. He was most popular in Jamaica in the late 1980s, with a series of singles using his self-styled "Rockstone Voice". He is not to be confused with the similarly named deejay, Prince Pompidou.

== Career ==
Pampidoo started deejaying on the Killamanjaro soundsystem in early 1983, often sparring with fellow deejay Tullo T (a.k.a. Tuloch T, Papa Tullo). In 1985, his most famous single, "Governor General", was released. During the latter half of the 1980s, Pampidoo released several more singles including "You No Ready" and "Water Bed". In 1986, a compilation album was released with eight of his songs on the track list (including "Governor General"). In 2007, Pampidoo released his latest single, "Selassie I Rule".

== Discography ==
=== Albums ===
- The Governor General (1993), Freedom Sounds

=== Singles ===
- "Bonanza"
- "Ghost Buster"
- "Grammy Award"
- "Hairstyle" (1986)
- "Love Up Me God"
- "Me Love Me Boops"
- "New Body Rock (1986)"
- "Synthesizer Voice" (1987)
- "The DJ with the Rockstone Voice" (Talking Parrot)
- "Governor General"
- "Water Bed"
- "Woman A Yu Yard A The Best"
- "Yu No Ready"
- "Selassie I Rule" (2007)
