= Bulgaria–United Kingdom relations =

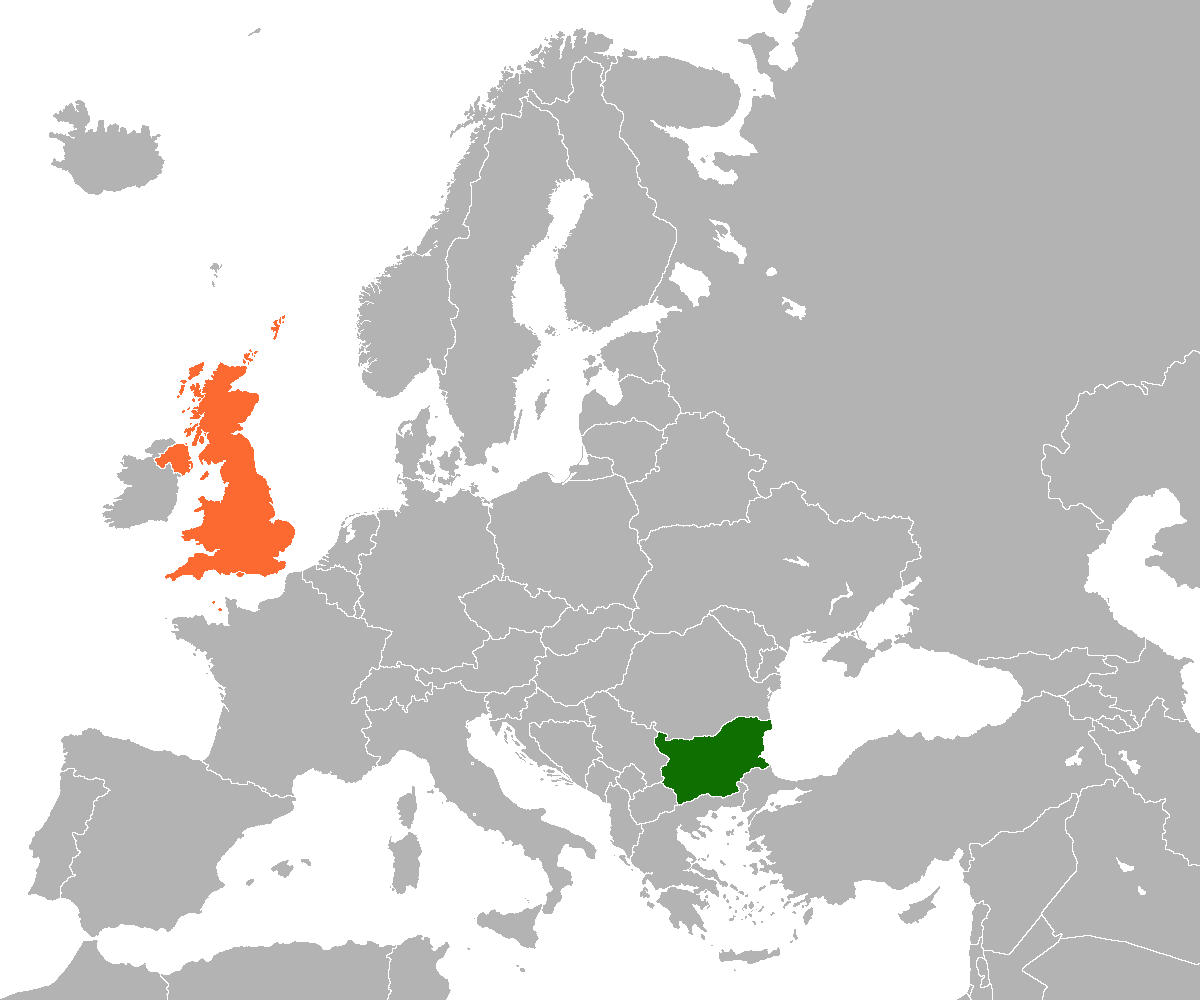

- Bulgaria: United Kingdom

Diplomatic mission
- Embassy of Bulgaria, London: Embassy of the United Kingdom, Sofia

Envoy
- Ambassador Marin Raykov: Ambassador Rob Dixon

Bulgaria and the United Kingdom established diplomatic relations in July, 1879. Bulgaria has an embassy in London, and the United Kingdom has an embassy in Sofia. Both countries are full members of NATO and the Council of Europe, with the United Kingdom giving full support to Bulgaria's applications to join NATO and the European Union. Bulgaria is a European Union member and the United Kingdom is a former European Union member.

== Historical relations ==
Both countries established diplomatic relations in July 1879 as Bulgaria achieved its independence from the Ottoman Empire. The two were enemies during World War I, most of World War II, and the Cold War.

Following the United Kingdom's withdrawal from the European Union, trade between the United Kingdom and European Union members such as Bulgaria has been governed by the EU–UK Trade and Cooperation Agreement since 1 January 2021.

== Royal visits to Bulgaria ==
- Edward VIII
  - 9 September 1936: Sofia
- The Duke of Edinburgh
  - October 1973: Varna
- The Prince of Wales
  - 6 – 8 November 1998: Sofia and Plovdiv
  - 13 – 14 March 2003: Sofia and Varna
- The Duke of York
  - 17–19 October 2001: Sofia
- The Earl of Wessex and The Countess of Wessex
  - 23 – 24 June 2013: Sofia
- The Duke of Kent
  - 7–9 April 2014: Sofia and Plovdiv
- Prince Michael of Kent
  - winter 1970
  - 18–20 May 2023: Sofia and Bachkovo Monastery

== Embassies ==
Bulgaria has an embassy in London and the United Kingdom has an embassy in Sofia.

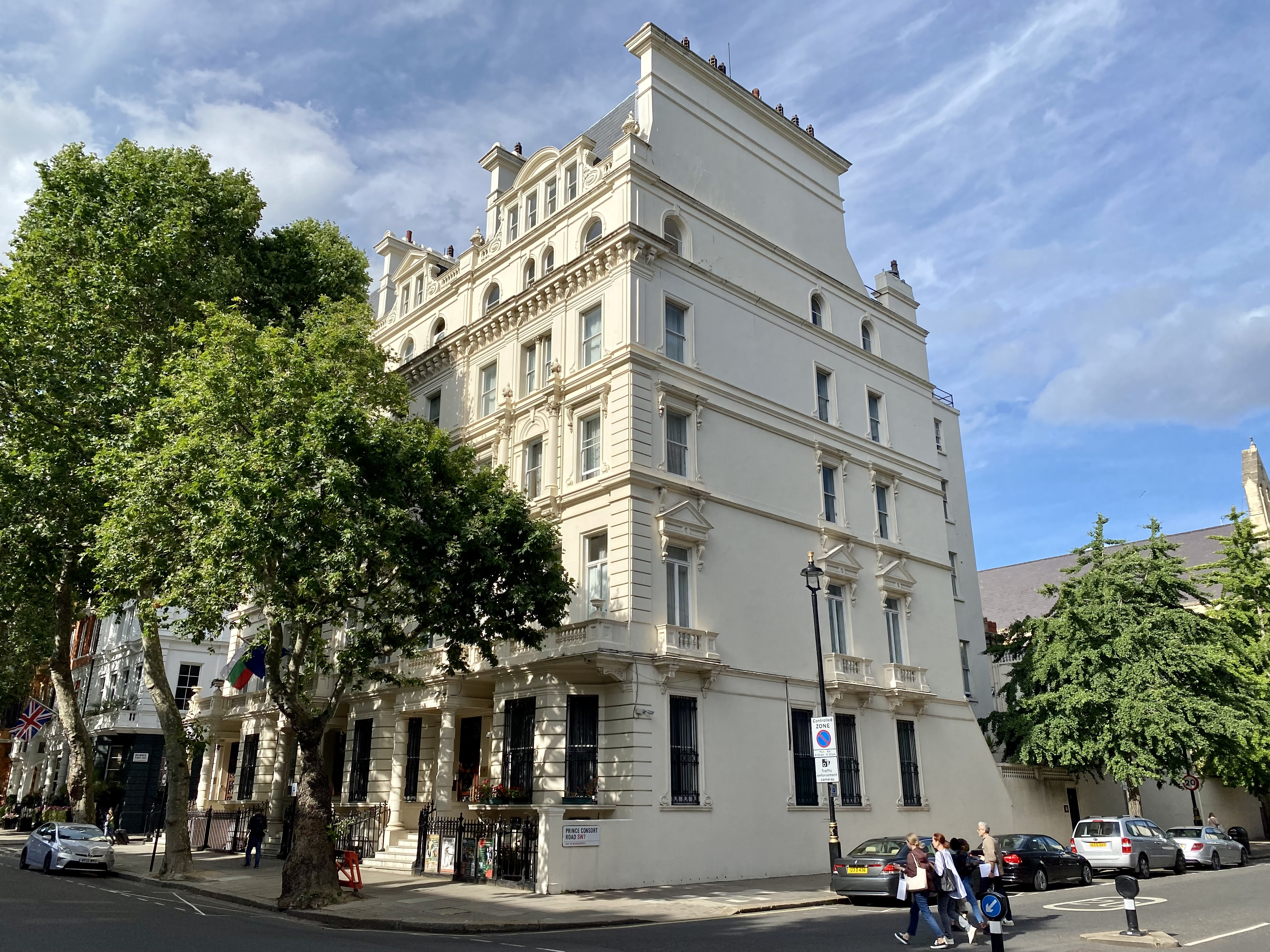
Embassy of Bulgaria in London

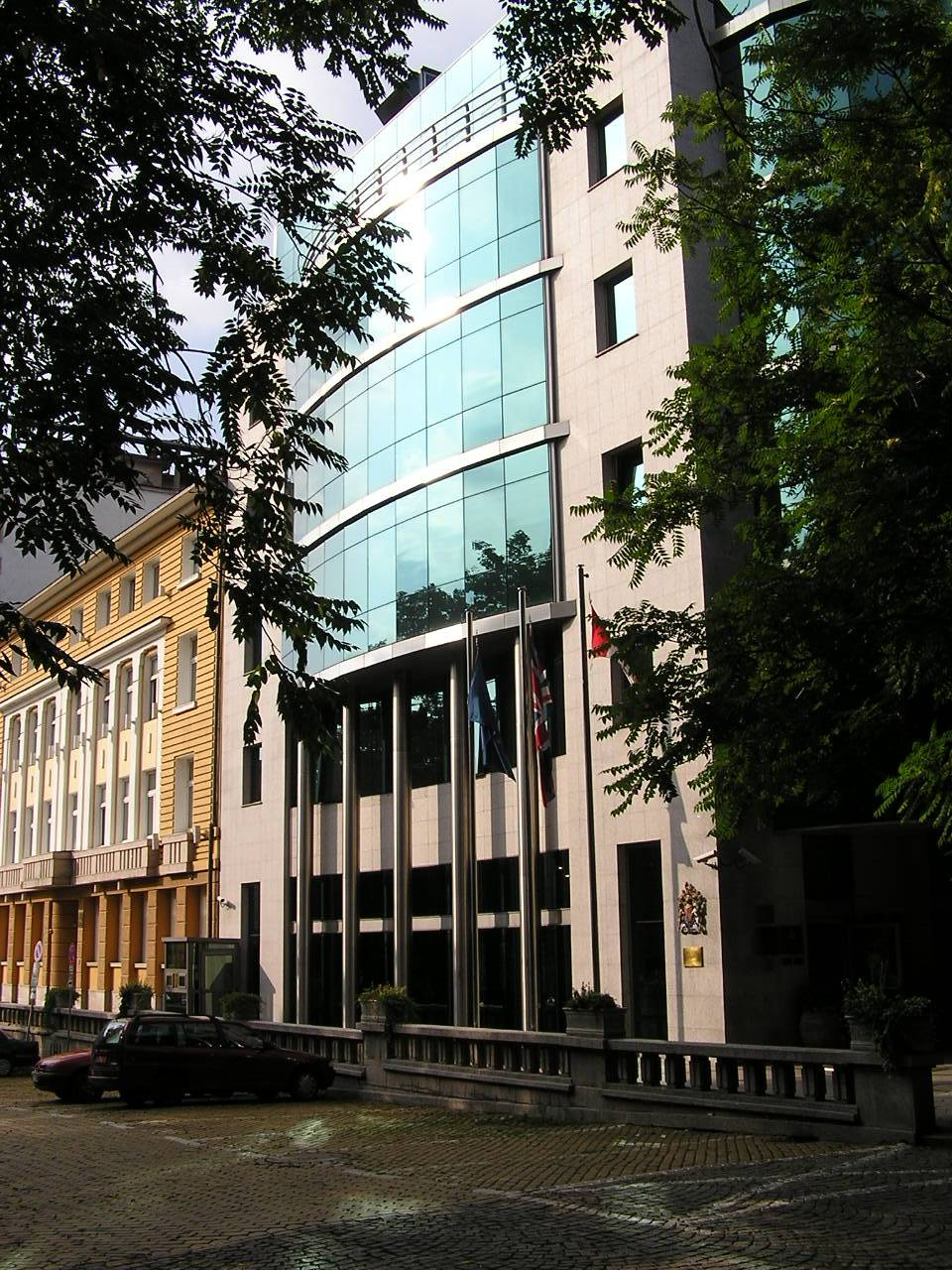
Embassy of the United Kingdom in Sofia

== See also ==
- Foreign relations of Bulgaria
- Foreign relations of the United Kingdom
- Bulgarians in the United Kingdom
- Embassy of Bulgaria, London
- List of ambassadors of the United Kingdom to Bulgaria
