= Rodigan =

Rodigan may refer to:

- David Rodigan
- Knights of Rodigan
