= Saxon Studio International =

British sound system

Saxon Studio International is a reggae sound system from London, the first UK sound system to win an international competition.

Saxon Studio International began operating in Lewisham, South London, in 1976.

The sound came to prominence in the early '80s because of the "fast chat" style which was pioneered by its deejay Peter King. Other Saxon MCs included Tippa Irie, Smiley Culture, Asher Senator, Papa Levi, Daddy Colonel, Daddy Rusty and Daddy Sandy, each of whom developed this style and went on to release records, some (such as Smiley and Tippa) achieving Top 40 hits in the UK national chart.

In 1992, Saxon won the UK Cup Clash (a tournament for reggae soundsystems).

In 1994, Saxon became the first UK soundsystem to win the World Clash.

Saxon continue to play internationally, including an annual outing at London's Notting Hill Carnival. Their style has influenced artists such as Massive Attack (who invited them to play at the 2008 Meltdown festival, which they curated) and The Bug (who has collaborated with Tippa Irie and Saxon selector Trevor Sax).

== Recordings and releases ==
Many recordings of Saxon sessions circulate unofficially on cassette tape, CDR or mp3.

However, an official recording of a mid-eighties session in Paddington, West London, entitled Saxon Studio International: Coughing Up Fire!!! was released by the Greensleeves Records subsidiary label UK Bubblers in 1984.
