= Stone Love Movement =

Jamaican sound system

Stone Love Movement, commonly referred to as simply Stone Love, is one of the major Jamaican sound systems.

== History ==
Based in Kingston, Jamaica, Winston "Wee Pow" Powell built the Stone Love sound system in 1972, using locally-built amplifiers. These were soon upgraded, and the equipment has been kept up to date over Stone Love's four decade history, with long-time engineer Winston Samuels in charge of technical aspects of the sound system. It became Jamaica's most popular sound system, known for its superior sound quality, and maintained this position into the 21st century. It has also played overseas in the United States, the United Kingdom, and Japan. Stone Love is renowned for its exclusive dubplates, featuring dubs from many artist the sound system help launched, including Buju Banton, Wayne Wonder, Johnny Osbourne, Shabba Ranks, Sanchez, and Beenie Man.

In the 1990s, rivalry with the Killamanjaro sound system led to a series of 'sound clashes' being staged. In 2003 Powell started a second sound system, Purple Love, which concentrates on vintage Jamaican music. A live album featuring a recording of the sound system performing, Stone Love Live, was released in 2005 on November Records. The sound system hosts the 'Weddy Weddy Wednesday' party every Wednesday at its base in Burlington Avenue, Kingston.

Apart from Wee Pow, the selectors have included Rory, Geefus, Billy Slaughter, Diamond, Fire Ras, Ice Burg, Scary Gary, and Dwayne Pow The sound system spawned the Stone Love and Father Pow record labels that have released hits by the likes of Bounty Killer, Jigsy King and Tony Curtis, Capleton, Tanya Stephens, and Daddy Screw. In August 2014 it was announced that Powell would receive the Order of Distinction in October that year. On 30 October 2014, the movement appeared at the Red Bull Culture Clash, clashing against Boy Better Know, A$AP Mob, and eventual winners Rebel Sound (David Rodigan, Shy FX, Chase & Status and MC Rage). To celebrate Stone Love's 42nd anniversary, the sound system toured the US in a series of performances ending on 27 December 2014 at the Red Stripe Oval in Kingston.

== Discography ==
=== Albums ===
| Year | Title | Label |
|---|---|---|
| 1994 | Stone Love Dancehall Vol. 2 :Lovers Selections | VP |
| 1997 | Stone Love Movement Presents Go Go Wine | VP |
| 1998 | It's A Stone Love Thing | VP |
