= The Virgin Queen (TV serial) =

2005 British television drama series

- Genre: Historical drama
- Written by: Paula Milne
- Directed by: Coky Giedroyc
- Starring: Anne-Marie Duff; Tom Hardy; Emilia Fox
- Theme music composer: Martin Phipps
- Country of origin: United Kingdom
- Original language: English
- No. of episodes: 4

Production
- Producer: Paul Rutman
- Running time: 237 minutes
- Production companies: BBC; Power Entertainment Media Ltd.

Original release
- Network: PBS
- Release: 13 November – 20 November 2005

The Virgin Queen is a 2005 BBC and Power co-production, four-part miniseries based upon the life of Queen Elizabeth I, starring Anne-Marie Duff and Tom Hardy as Robert Dudley, 1st Earl of Leicester. It was nominated for the BAFTA TV Award for Best Drama Serial in 2007.

== Plot ==
From her time as a young princess in her early twenties to her death in 1603, The Virgin Queen explores both the public and private life of Queen Elizabeth I (Anne-Marie Duff). The series focuses on the internal motivation behind 25-year-old Elizabeth's vow of chastity upon her accession to the throne. As a child, she confides in her friend Robert Dudley, 1st Earl of Leicester (Tom Hardy), that she wishes never to marry. Her relationship with Dudley, who would later become master of the Queen's horses, spans the four-part series and calls into question the ambiguous nature of their relations. The series features a scene where a dreaming Elizabeth fantasizes about making love to Dudley. When his wife Amy (Emilia Fox) dies under suspicious circumstances, Dudley proposes to the Queen and is rejected. Upon his death, Elizabeth's affections turn to Dudley's step-son Robert Devereux, 2nd Earl of Essex. However, when he is caught making plans for a coup, she has him executed.

As queen, Elizabeth is meticulous in constructing her public image. Scrutinizing every detail, she micro-manages everything from her appearance to her attitude. Alternately chaste and flirtatious, she nevertheless eschews love in favour of England. History and politics are intertwined throughout the series, from England's defeat of the Spanish Armada to the change from a Catholic to a Protestant nation, Elizabeth uses her power and her court to maintain her will.

== Production ==
Co-Produced by the BBC and Power television for £9 million, The Virgin Queen was filmed at Pinewood Studios in summer 2005. Originally intended to air on BBC One in September 2005, the date would have coincided with the release of the Channel 4 two-part miniseries Elizabeth I (starring Helen Mirren). Due to the conflict, the BBC decided to delay the UK release until after the US opening in November 2005 on PBS's Masterpiece Theatre.

Despite being a biopic of Elizabeth's life and reign, the series presented its main character with particular interest in several themes, most notably the emotional impact of her mother's execution and her love for Leicester. Writer Paula Milne said of the series, "As my research started to reveal her unravelling, tumultuous relationship with Dudley, I knew I had found the spine of the story. Smart political and psychological interpretations of her life might give the drama contemporary gravitas, but its real power would lie in its emotional truth. Losing love, for whatever reason, reaches out through the centuries to all of us who have found love and lost it."

== Summary ==
=== Episode 1 ===
The first episode depicts Elizabeth from her imprisonment in the Tower of London by the Queen, her sister Mary I, accused with plotting the Queen's demise, to her accession to the throne following Mary's death, and her coronation. Elizabeth was imprisoned in the Tower, accused of participating in Thomas Wyatt's rebellion to overthrow Mary. The episode strongly hints Elizabeth's participation, though evidence of this remains highly conjectural. The episode also establishes Elizabeth's relationship with Robert Dudley, and they are shown to be greatly in love, despite Dudley being married to Amy Robsart, whom he met at the Stanfield Hall, they were married when both were 18 years old. Elizabeth's frustration at her later house arrest at Woodstock Manor is emphasised to somewhat comic effect. She is shown being held at Woodstock from her release from the Tower until her sister's death from cancer, when in reality she was only held there a year, before being recalled to London so Mary could keep a closer eye on her. The episode also depicts the legend of Elizabeth being told she is Queen of England under an oak tree, depicted as being in Woodstock but which in reality is claimed to have occurred at Hatfield House, and her utterance of the quote "This is the work of the Lord, and it is marvellous in our eyes..."

=== Episode 2 ===
The second episode shows Elizabeth from several months to a year after her coronation, establishing herself as Queen, to the emergence of Mary, Queen of Scots, as her political rival. The episode makes much of her clandestine romance with Robert Dudley, and her resistance to marriage. Elizabeth is shown to be struggling with the adjustment to being Queen, especially in regard to Dudley. A scene shows Elizabeth dreaming of making love with Dudley, but the plot of the series follows the opinion that she resisted these urges, and remained a virgin. The episode introduces or further establishes several key characters in the story of Elizabeth's reign, including William Cecil; Amy Robsart; Francis Walsingham; Katherine Ashley; Thomas Howard, Duke of Norfolk (Elizabeth's cousin); and Lettice Knollys. The episode also shows Robert at his house with his wife, Amy, her health is in a poor condition, asking her husband to stay with her, but Robert replies that he must attend the court. also, the episode depicts Elizabeth's courtship from Philip II of Spain (her sister's widower) and the Archduke Charles of Austria. It also shows Elizabeth's early dealings with her cousin Mary, Queen of Scots, including her plans for her to marry Dudley, as a means to secure a political union between England and Scotland, and the treason of Thomas Howard, 4th Duke of Norfolk. The closing scene depicts the start of the relationship between Robert Dudley and Lettice Knollys. Midway through the episode, Elizabeth's contraction of smallpox is dramatically depicted, the death of Dudley's wife, Amy Robsart, who waited and longed for Robert, the episode shows her taking her own life, to help achieving her husband's ambitions to marry Elizabeth.

=== Episode 3 ===
The third episode begins with Elizabeth's courtship with Francis, Duke of Anjou, and ends just following the destruction of the Spanish Armada. During her near death from smallpox in the previous episode, Elizabeth is shown wearing the ornate red wig or hairpiece she has become famous for. The episode depicts Elizabeth's courtship of Anjou as nothing more than politics, and a wish for an heir, and suggests that she harboured little real affection for him, though like many of her courtships, this remains ambiguous. The key point of character drama in this episode is Elizabeth's discovery of Robert Dudley's marriage to Lettice Knollys, in that scene, Dudley echoed the phraseology from his dead wife, Amy's earlier letter, he says, "I mortgaged my life in the hope that someday we'd be together. I have stood by and watched while others fall at your feet. flattering you vanity." upon which she is shown flying into a grief-fuelled rage. The illness Dudley suffered prior to his death is also depicted from fairly early on, though Elizabeth remains ignorant of his affliction. Great focus is also placed on Elizabeth's turmoil over the situation with Mary, Queen of Scots, who is executed towards the end of the episode, an act which Elizabeth is shown expressing great remorse in private. The impending invasion of the Spanish Armada is dealt with fairly rapidly, the primary scene concerning the Armada being Elizabeth's encampment at Tilbury, where she gives an invigorating speech. These scenes are intercut, and immediately followed with her grief and heartbreak over the death of Robert Dudley, and her brief seclusion during the celebrations over the Armada's defeat. The episode ends with her first encounter with Robert Devereux. The ending makes much of the theory that Devereux was actually the son of Robert Dudley by Lettice Knollys, instead of the result of her first marriage to Walter Devereux.

=== Episode 4 ===
This episode shows Elizabeth in the twilight of her reign. Anne Marie Duff and Sienna Guillory are given ageing makeup in this episode, accentuating their age in comparison to the previous episodes, marking them as enduring 'relics' of the past. The episode revolves mainly around Elizabeth's relationship with Robert Devereux as her court favourite, and the machinations for his advancement by his mother Lettice Knollys, the Queen's former handmaiden. The enmity between Elizabeth and Lettice is also emphasised, and the plot deviates from established history by showing that Elizabeth eventually did meet with Lettice before her death, albeit briefly and without exchanging words. Devereux is held as a pawn between the two women, his love for Elizabeth on one side, his devotion to his mother on the other, the pressure of which causes him great turmoil, bordering on mental instability, culminating in his attempt at rebellion towards the end of the episode. One haunting scene in the episode shows Devereux walking in on a half-dressed Elizabeth, and his shock when he sees the Queen as decrepit and old, without her wig or make up. Elizabeth is the one remaining relic of the England she once knew, most of her friends and trusted advisors having been replaced by the next generation. The emphasis on Devereux takes away somewhat from the political problems Elizabeth was facing at the time, such as with Spain, France and Ireland, as well as significant problems in England itself with high taxes and the failure of the crops, though these events are made frequent reference to. The episode concludes with Robert Devereux's execution and Elizabeth's demise, including her encroaching senility and dementia with age, and her depression over Devereux's death. In these scenes, she is shown delivering her famous Golden Speech to Parliament. Her death is depicted in a more dramatic fashion than in reality, with her refusing to lie down in fear that she would not stand again. Elizabeth is also reminiscing of her life; walking through a crowd of people when her father was on the throne with someone saying "bastard", being informed that her sister Mary is dead, her beloved friend and chief-lady of the bedchamber Kat Ashley smiling at her, William Cecil, her one true love Robert Dudley smiling at her and her fateful exclamation of "I will have one mistress here, and no master! Do you hear me?!" Finally, she is drawn from her reminiscing when she apparently suffers a stroke and collapses, with her advisers, courtiers and ladies-in-waiting rushing to assist as she dies. The episode ends with William Cecil's son, Robert, preparing for the accession of Elizabeth's successor, James I. He is seen discovering that Elizabeth added a clasp to the ring worn by the sovereign; opening it, he discovers that a portrait has been hidden. The episode ends with Robert speaking "It is Anne Boleyn; her mother."

== Cast and credits ==
=== Cast ===
Role	Portrayed by	Appears in episodes
Queen Elizabeth I	Anne-Marie Duff	1, 2, 3, 4
Robert Dudley, Earl of Leicester	Tom Hardy	1, 2, 3, 4 (cameo and flashback only)
Amy, Lady Dudley	Emilia Fox	2
Thomas Radclyffe, 3rd Earl of Sussex	Dexter Fletcher	1, 2, 3
Thomas Howard, 4th Duke of Norfolk	Kevin McKidd	1, 2
William Cecil, 1st Baron Burghley	Ian Hart	1, 2, 3, 4
Robert Cecil, 1st Earl of Salisbury	Daniel Evans	3, 4
Queen Mary I	Joanne Whalley	1
Lettice Knollys	Sienna Guillory	1, 2, 3, 4
Sir Francis Walsingham	Ben Daniels	2, 3
Lord Chancellor Gardiner	Robert Pugh	1
Robert Devereux, 2nd Earl of Essex	Hans Matheson	3, 4
King Philip II of Spain	Stanley Townsend	1
Kat Ashley	Tara Fitzgerald	1, 2, 3, 4 (flashback and cameo only)
Sir James Melville	Ewen Bremner	2
Mary, Queen of Scots	Charlotte Winner	3
Sir Walter Raleigh	Derek Riddell	3, 4
Charles Blount, 1st Earl of Devonshire	Sebastian Armesto	4
Francis Bacon, Viscount St Albans	Neil Stuke	4
Francis, Duke of Anjou	Matthias Girbig	3
Jean de Simier	Enzo Cilenti	3
Reginald Pole	Michael Feast	1
John Brydges	Tony Guilfoyle	4
Henry Bedingfeld	Pearce Quigley	1
Cecily	Siobhan Hewlett	4
Sir Horace Alsop	Karl Theobald	4
Dentist	Geoff Bell	4
Earl of Southampton	Shaun Evans	4
Agnes	Joanna Griffiths	4
Thomas Phelippes	Vincent Franklin	3
Gilbert Gifford	Stephen Walters	3
Christopher Hatton	Jason Watkins	1, 2, 3
John Dee	Alan Williams	1
Thomas Wyatt the Younger	Bryan Dick	1
Little Boy	Jacob Collier (as Jacob Moriarty)	1

=== Production credits ===
- Producer – Paul Rutman
- Director – Coky Giedroyc
- Writer – Paula Milne
- Composer – Martin Phipps
- Director of Photography – David Odd
- Production Designer – Donal Wood
- Film Editor – Joe Walker
- Make Up Supervisor – Karen Hartley
- Costume Designer – Amy Roberts
- Casting Director – Nina Gold
- Executive Producers – Justin Bode, Laura Mackie, Kate Harwood, Simon Curtis

=== Filming locations ===
- Alnwick Castle (Execution scenes)
- Baddesley Clinton, Warwickshire (Cumnor Place)
- Bamburgh Castle, Northumberland (Tilbury)
- Chastleton House (Whitehall Palace interiors and gardens)
- Chillingham Castle (Fotheringhay Castle)
- Labyrinthine Keep at Warkworth Castle (Tower of London)
- London's Middle Temple (Receiving Chamber)
- Lord Leycester hospital (the Strand)
- New College, Oxford (Anointment room)
- Raby Castle (Whitehall Palace)
- Broughton Castle (Woodstock Manor)

== Release ==
=== Home media ===
The Virgin Queen was released on DVD in 2006 by PBS and is also available digitally on Amazon Prime Video and iTunes.

The series was also released on DVD in Germany and England. The DVD releases were heavily censored and the 4 episodes were recut to 2 episodes. The 240 minutes (4 hours) of the original TV broadcasts were cut to 200 minutes (3 hours and 20 minutes) in the DVD versions.

The digital releases that are available in Europe on Amazon Prime Video and iTunes are also ca. 40 minutes shorter, are censored and recut to 2 episodes.

== Soundtrack ==
The Virgin Queen: Music From The Original Television Soundtrack

Soundtrack album by Martin Phipps
- Released: 2 February 2006
- Studio: Hear No Evil
- Genre: Classical
- Length: 44:45
- Label: BBC Worldwide Ltd.
- Producer: Simon Platz

The original score was composed by Martin Phipps and features vocals by the Mediæval Bæbes and the London Bulgarian Choir. The score won an Ivor Novello Award for "Best Television soundtrack" on 24 May 2007. The lyrics on the track played during the opening sequence were derived from a poem written by Elizabeth I.

=== Track listing ===
All lyrics are written by Martin Phipps (adapted) except where noted; all music is composed by Martin Phipps except where noted.

No.	Title	Lyrics	Music	Vocals	Length
1.	"The Virgin Queen"			Mediæval Bæbes	2:08
2.	"The Work of the Lord"			Mediæval Bæbes	3:20
3.	"One Mistress"	Dessislava Stefanova		The London Bulgarian Choir	2:32
4.	"Miseria Nomine"			Mediæval Bæbes	1:05
5.	"A Legacy of Comfort"				3:35
6.	"Essex"		Ruth Barrett	Mediæval Bæbes	3:31
7.	"Lilly White, Comely Queen"			Katharine Blake	1:14
8.	"La Volta"		Martin Phipps & Ruth Barrett		1:49
9.	"Armada"				1:24
10.	"God Breathed"	Dessislava Stefanova		The London Bulgarian Choir	1:30
11.	"I've Come For Her"			The London Bulgarian Choir	3:41
12.	"The Queen Lives"			Mediæval Bæbes	2:19
13.	"Remember Me"	Dessislava Stefanova		Dessislava Stefanova	2:25
14.	"The Tower"				3:17
15.	"Glass Words"				1:48
16.	"Say It's Not So"			Mediæval Bæbes	2:45
17.	"I'll Be Blunt, Blount"			Mediæval Bæbes	1:10
18.	"Faithful Hearts"				1:18
19.	"Gloriana"			Mediæval Bæbes	3:36
Total length:					44:45

== See also ==
- Historical drama film
- BBC television drama
- BBC
- PBS
