= Luca Pretolesi =

Italian music producer and audio engineer

- Genres: EDM, Pop, Hip-Hop
- Occupations: Music producer, Mixing engineer, DJ
- Labels: Studio DMI, Mixdown Music

Luca Pretolesi is an Italian Grammy Award-nominated mixing engineer, music producer, musician, DJ, and educator. He has many records that made it to the top of the charts since 1990s when he started his techno project Digital Boy.

== Life ==
At the age of 16 Pretolesi moved to Milan, where he completed a three-year training as a sound engineer at a music school. After leaving school, he began in the late 1980s with the production of their own music. In 1990 he published the first single under various project names. He was best known for the Digital Boy project. In 1991 his first album Futuristik was released. With the single The Mountain of King, which Pretolesi had written together with Ronnie Lee, he was able to reach number one in the Italian single charts in 1994. In 1994 he founded his own label D-Boy Records. Numerous other publications appeared by the early 2000s.

In 2002 Pretolesi moved to Las Vegas and increasingly turned to sound engineering, specializing in mixing and mastering, where he has helped craft modern EDM sound. He mixed music for artists and projects such as Steve Aoki, Diplo, Major Lazer, Jack Ü, Lil Jon, Gareth Emery, Snoop Lion and Skrillex.

In 2013 he opened his studio called Digital Music Innovation in the Wynn Las Vegas hotel complex, which later moved to new custom-built facilities.

In 2020 Pretolesi was nominated for the Best Dance Grammy Award in the 63rd Grammy Awards as a mixing engineer for the song "On My Mind" – Diplo & Sidepiece.

That same year Pretolesi started his own online mixing and mastering teaching academy named MyMixLab. Pretolesi works in collaboration with Acustica Audio having created the Diamond services plugins together which includes partnerships with engineers and producers Mike Dean, Dave Pensado, Greg Wells and others.

== Discography ==
Albums

- 1991: Digital Boy – Futuristik (Flying Records)
- 1991: Digital Boy – Technologiko (Flying Records)
- 1995: Digital Boy – Ten Steps to the Rise (D-Boy Records)

Singles and EPs

- 1990: S 900 / S 950 – La Bestia (Bring It On Down) (Demo Studio)
- 1990: Luca P. – Electric Live (Demo Studio)
- 1990: Digital Boys featuring Cool De Suck – Techno (Dance to the House) (Demo Studio)
- 1990: Digital Boy – Gimme a Fat Beat (Remix) / Kokko (Music Man Records)
- 1990: Oi Sonik – Just Let Your Body Ride (Music Man Records)
- 1991: The Voice of Rave – The Voice of Rave (UMM)
- 1991: Digital Boy – OK! Alright (Flying Records)
- 1991: Digital Boy – 1-2-3 Acid! (Flying Records)
- 1991: Digital Boy – This Is Mutha F**ker! (Flying Records)
- 1991: Digital Boy – Gimme a Fat Beat (Flying Records)
- 1991: Digital Boy – Futuristik E.P. (Flying Records)
- 1993: Digital Boy – Crossover (Flying Records)
- 1994: Digital Boy with Asia – The Mountain of King (D-Boy Records)
- 1994: Digital Boy – Dig It All Beat (Flying Records)
- 1995: Digital Boy – Exterminate / Direct to Rave (D-Boy Records)
- 1996: Asia + Digital B – Let's Live (Electronik Musik)
- 1996: Digital Boy – Back to the Past Vol. 1 (Italian Steel)
- 1997: The Dark Side – Beats & Riffs 1 (Italian Steel)
- 1997: Digital Boy – Back to the Past Vol. 2 (Italian Steel)
- 1997: Digital Boy – Back to the Past Vol. 3 (Italian Steel)
- 2000: Digital Boy and MC Rage – Akkur (D-Boy Black Label)
- 2001: The Masochist & Digital Boy – Shout Out (D-Boy Black Label)
- 2001: DJ J.D.A. & Digital Boy feat. MC Rage – Hardcore for Life (ADN Hardcore)
- 2002: MC Rage with Digital Boy & DJ Bike – September Forever (D-Boy Black Label)
- 2003: Digital Boy vs. Outblast – Be 4 Real E.P. (Masters of Hardcore)
- 2003: Digital Boy – Really Vulgar (D-Boy Black Label)
- 2004: Digital Boy & MC Rage – Sugar Daddy (D-Boy Black Label)
- 2008: Digital Boy & Shane Thomas – Sexy, Sultry, Delicious, Dirty (Melodica)
