= Keith Walford =

Jamaican politician

Keith Walford is the representative for the Saint Ann district in the Parliament of Jamaica. A member of the People's National Party (PNP), he was elected in the 2011 election that saw the PNP win 2/3 of parliamentary seats. He is also the founder of the sound system Bass Odyssey.
