= Caspa =

English dubstep music producer (born 1982)

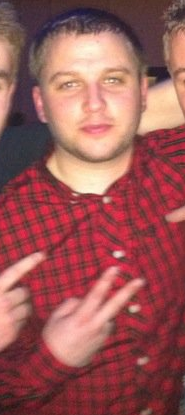
- Caspa in 2010

Background information
- Also known as: Caspa, Quiet Storm
- Born: Gary McCann; 30 May 1982 (age 44)
- Origin: London, England
- Genres: Dubstep, bass
- Occupations: Music producer, DJ
- Years active: 2003–present
- Labels: Storming Productions; Dub Police; Sub Soldiers

Gary McCann, known professionally as Caspa (born 30 May 1982), is a dubstep music producer from West London.

== Biography ==
McCann's creative involvement in music began after a promising basketball career was cut short by a shoulder injury. Growing up, McCann has cited jungle and hip hop as his main influences. He received his first public attention when his first track, "Bassbins", recorded under the pseudonym Quiet Storm, was picked up by BBC Radio 1Xtra's DJ Da Flex.

McCann started his own label focusing on dubstep and grime artists. Storming Productions was founded in 2004, and then he joined Stingray Records in 2006. Around this time, he also began his own radio show on Rinse FM. McCann also created an additional label, Dub Police, to focus specifically on dubstep. Dub Police was composed of Rusko, L-Wiz, N-Type, The Others and more.

He has performed at a number of high-profile UK music festivals, including Glastonbury and Global Gathering, and his release "Back for the First Time" received widespread public attention, being playlisted on BBC Radio 1. He has also performed at many other notable festivals around the world such as Exit Festival in Serbia, Stereosonic in Australia and Lollapalooza in the U.S. Despite his widespread success, McCann still found time to perform every two months at the renowned Fabric in his hometown of London as of 2013.

His debut album, Everybody's Talking, Nobody's Listening, was released on 4 May 2009 on Caspa's own label Sub Soldiers/Fabric Records and included an appearance from legendary reggae figure Sir David 'Ram Jam' Rodigan.

In August 2012, it was announced that Caspa and various notable electronic music producers would be featured on the Halo 4 remix album.

"War" featuring Keith Flint was used in the trailer for Kick-Ass 2.

In 2014, McCann moved to Denver, Colorado, US. He cited Denver's music culture and friendly people as influential factors, although he was unsure whether the move would be permanent.

== Discography ==
=== Releases ===
- "For The Kids" / "Jeffery & Bungle" / "Cockney Flute" – Dub Police – 2006
- "Rubber Chicken" – Tempa – 2006
- "Cockney Violin" / "Dub Warz" – Dub Police – 2006
- "Acton Dread" / "Cockney Flute (Rusko Remix)" – Rusko / Caspa – Dub Police – 2007
- "Ave It: Volume 1" – Sub Soldiers – 2007
- "Louder" / "Noise Disorganiser" – Pitch Black – 2007
- "Bread Get Bun" / "King George" – Aquatic Lab – 2007
- "Ohh R Ya – License to Thrill Part 1" – Dub Police – 2007
- "Ave It: Volume 2" – Sub Soldiers 2008
- "Floor Dem" / "My Pet Monster" – Digital Sound Boy – 2008
- "Soulful Geeza – License To Thrill Part 4" – Dub Police – 2008
- "Louder VIP" / "Power Shower" – Sub Soldiers – 2009
- "The Takeover (featuring Dynamite MC)" / "Marmite" – Sub Soldiers / Fabric 2009
- Everybody's Talking, Nobody's Listening – Sub Soldiers / Fabric – 2009
- "Are You Ready" – Dub Police / Scion AV – 2010
- "I Beat My Robot" / "Marmite (Original Sin Remix)" – Sub Soldiers / Fabric – 2010
- "Terminator (Trolley Snatcha Remix)" / "Marmite (Doctor P Remix)" – Sub Soldiers – 2010
- "Love Never Dies (Back for the First Time)" – Sub Soldiers – 2010 (with Mr Hudson)
- "Neck Snappah" – Sub Soldiers – 2011
- "Fulham To Waterloo" / "Bang Bang" – Sub Soldiers – 2011
- "Not for the Playlist EP" – Sub Soldiers – 2011
- "Sell Out EP" – Sub Soldiers – 2012
- "War" (featuring Keith Flint) – EMI UK – 2012
- "Check Your Self!" – Released via SoundCloud – 2012
- "On It" (featuring Mighty High Coup) – Dub Police – 2012
- Alpha Omega – Dub Police – 2013
- "Mad Man" (featuring Riko) – Dub Police – 2014
- "Neurological" – Submerged Music – 2018

=== Remixes ===
- DJ Kudos – "Bring The Lights Down (Caspa Mix)" – Sound Proof Records – 2006
- Art of Noise – "Moments in Love (Caspa Remix)" – Not on Label – 2007
- N-Type / The Others – "Way of the Dub (Caspa Remix) / Bushido (Caspa Remix)" – Dub Police – 2007
- Matty G – "West Coast Rocks (Caspa Remix)" – Argon – 2007
- Wonder – "What (Caspa Remix)" – Wonderland – 2008
- Lennie De Ice – "We Are I.E. (Caspa & Rusko Remix)" – Y4K – 2008
- TC – "Wheres My Money (Caspa Remix)" – D-Style Recordings – 2008
- Depeche Mode – "Wrong (Caspa Remix)"- EMI – 2009
- Deadmau5 & Kaskade – "I Remember (Caspa Remix)" – Mau5trap – 2009
- Rusko – "Cockney Thug (Caspa Remix)" – Sub Soldiers – 2009
- Grand Puba – "Get it (Caspa's 80Eightie's Remix)" – Scion/AV – 2009
- Kid Sister – "Right Hand Hi (Caspa Remix)" – Asylum Records – 2009
- Miike Snow – "Black & Blue (Caspa Remix)" – Columbia – 2009
- Breakage Feat. Newham Generals & David Rodigan – "Hard (Caspa & The Others – The Dub Police Takeover Remix)" – Digital Soundboy – 2009
- Adam F & Horx feat. Redman – "Shut The Lights Off (Caspa & Trolley Snatcha – The Dub Police Takeover Remix)" – Breakbeat Kaos – 2009
- 30 Seconds To Mars Feat. Kanye West – "Hurricane (Caspa Remix)" – Capitol – 2010
- Ludacris – "How Low (Caspa Remix)" – Def Jam – 2010
- Swedish House Mafia Feat. Pharrell – "One" (Your Name) (Caspa Remix) – Polydore – 2012
- Katy B – "Easy Please Me (Caspa Remix)" – Rinse – 2011
- Buraka Som Sistema – "Hangover (BaBaBa) (Caspa Remix)" – Enchufada – 2011
- Plan B – "Ill Manors (Caspa Remix)" – Atlantic – 2012
- Neil Davidge – "Ascendancy (Halo 4 OST) (Caspa Remix)" – 7 Hz Productions – 2012
- Deadmau5 – "FML (Caspa Re-Fix)" – Released via SoundCloud – 2012
- The Prodigy - "The Day Is My Enemy" (Caspa Remix) - Take Me to the Hospital/Cooking Vinyl, Three Six Zero/Warner Bros - 2015

=== DJ mixes ===
- Caspa & Rusko – FabricLive.37 – fabric – 2007
- "My Style" – Dub Police – 2010
- Caspa – Mix 1.0 – 2017
