= Everybody's Talking, Nobody's Listening =

Studio album by Caspa
- Released: 4 May 2009
- Genre: Dubstep
- Length: 44:23
- Label: Sub Soldiers/Fabric Recordings
- Producer: Caspa

Everybody's Talking, Nobody's Listening is the debut album by Caspa, a dubstep musician and producer. It was released on 4 May 2009 on Caspa's own label Sub Soldiers/Fabric Records. It features a number of guest producers and vocalists including an intro speech by reggae selector David Rodigan.

== Critical reception ==
The album received mixed to positive reviews. Daily Music Guide described the album as "amazingly organic for being so exactingly constructed" and compares Caspa to a classical composer. NME wrote that the album "falls a little short of the wobbly swagger of his cohort’s club hits." URB stated that "his foray into putting out a full-length has produced what half-step usually procures; the all-too-well reaction of immediate mediocrity."

Professional ratings
Review scores
Source	Rating
AllMusic	3/5 stars
Daily Music Guide	4/5
Drowned in Sound	7/10
MusicOMH	3/5 stars
NME	5/10
URB	3/5 stars

== Track listings ==
It was released as a CD and three-piece vinyl package.

=== CD ===
No.	Title	Length
1.	"Intro" (feat. David Rodigan)	0:25
2.	"Low Blow"	4:24
3.	"The Takeover" (feat. Dynamite MC)	4:12
4.	"Marmite"	4:10
5.	"Riot Powder (Intro)" (feat. Rod Azlan)	0:30
6.	"Riot Powder"	3:07
7.	"Lon-Don City" (feat. Uncle Sam)	4:23
8.	"The Terminator"	3:28
9.	"Rat-A-Tat Tat" (feat. Dynamite MC)	3:02
10.	"Victoria's Secret" (feat. D1)	3:42
11.	"I Beat My Robot"	2:47
12.	"Disco Jaws" (feat. Beezy)	4:09
13.	"Back to '93"	6:12

=== Vinyl ===
Disc one
No.	Title	Length
1.	"Riot Powder"	3:07
2.	"Victoria's Secret" (feat. D1)	3:42

Disc two
No.	Title	Length
1.	"Low Blow"	4:24
2.	"Rat-A-Tat Tat" (feat. Dynamite MC)	3:02

Disc three
No.	Title	Length
1.	"Disco Jaws" (feat. Beezy)	4:09
2.	"Back to '93"	6:12
