= Early B =

Jamaican musician (born 1957–1994)

- Also known as: The Doctor
- Born: Earlando Arrington Neil; 28 February 1957
- Origin: Kingston, Jamaica
- Died: 11 September 1994 (aged 37) Dorchester, Massachusetts
- Genres: Dancehall; reggae

Earlando Arrington Neil (28 February 1957 – 11 September 1994) better known by his stage name Early B, was an early dancehall and reggae deejay whose lyrics had a cultural bent, noted mainly in his hits "Visit of King Selassie", "History of Jamaica" and "Wheely Wheely", the latter an ode to bicycle-riding in Jamaica.

== Biography ==
Earlando was born into a poor family and left a promising school career at age seventeen to support his mother and two brothers. He began work as a machine clerk but within a year was elevated to acting supervisor.

Neil began performing live on Soul Imperial Hi-Fi alongside his young apprentice, Wild Apache (aka Super Cat) (b. William Maragh). Earlando supposedly earned his stage name as a result of his reputation for arriving to shows early, thus gaining the name Early Bird, then finally Early B. Early B was soon approached, while on vacation with Stuart Brown (owner of African Star Sound), by a larger sound system, King Majesty. King Majesty was the only set to play all over the parish of St. Thomas. In the evenings he dragged the young Supercat out of his yard in Kingston to the countryside where they performed on King Majesty for almost a year. The owner of King Majesty was a manager in the sugar cane industry and was unable to run the sound system during harvest time. Frustration boiled over for "Cat" and Early B who both had ambitions to make it "big time". Their first chance came with Killamanjaro. Killamanjaro began as a sound system in the hills above Kingston with a resident mike-man known by the stage name of "Oh Lord". In 1980–81, the principal reason for the rise of Killamanjaro was because Early B and Supercat had become its crowd-pulling regulars. Soon every hopeful deejay wanted to "hold the mike" on the Killamanjaro sound alongside Early B, who had by now acquired a new nickname – The Doctor. Such was the demand that Killamanjaro set a record, that still holds today, by performing on fifty-two consecutive nights in Kingston.

Over the next two years, Early B was in constant demand as a recording artist scoring hits such as Gaterman Get Fraid, Wheel Wheely (also called One Wheely Wheely), Sunday Dish, and Learn Fe Drive. His next step towards the top was a move to the United States where he continued to be a dancehall favourite. Early B's deejay career brought him to other sound systems as well, including the African Star sound system in Toronto, Canada and Crystal Blue Flames Sound in New York City.

Early performed throughout the US and England (as well as Jamaica) until he was shot to death inside the Windsor Cricket Club, Dorchester, Massachusetts, on 11 September 1994. While rumours have circulated as to the reasoning behind the murder, his killers have never been found.

Early B recorded several albums during the mid-1980s, which remain well-circulated in the digital age today. Several tribute compilation albums have recently been released on CD, such as Immortal and A Memorial Tributed Reggae Hits.

== Discography ==
"Four Wheel No Real" (album #DSR 5092)

- Released: 1984
- Format: LP
- Label: Midnight Rock
- Producer: Jah Thomas
- Tracks: Eight
- Singles: "Cane Man A Fe Bathe"

"Ghost Buster" (album)

- Released: 1985
- Format: LP
- Label: Black Solidarity
- Tracks: Eight

"Sunday Dish" (album)

- Released: 1985
- Format: LP
- Label: Sunset
- Producer: Jah Thomas
- Tracks: Nine
- Singles: "History of Jamaica"

"Wheely Wheely" (album)

- Released: 1985
- Format: LP
- Label: Sunset
- Tracks: Eight
- Singles: "Wheely Wheely"
