= Dessislava Stefanova =

Bulgarian singer and choir director

Dessislava Stefanova is a Bulgarian soprano singer and folk choir director. She was named Bulgarian Woman of the Year (Българка на годината) 2017.

Born in Stara Zagora, by age six Stefanova was training in western classical music, and singing with children's folk music and dance ensemble Zagorche. On moving to Sofia to study linguistics at Sofia University, she was offered a place in the Filip Kutev National Folk Music and Dance Ensemble, and sang professionally with them for three years, until she moved to the United Kingdom in 2000. She subsequently gained a master's degree in music at London's School of Oriental and African Studies and completed Estill Voice Training to level 3.

She is a featured soloist on films including Troy, Brothers Grim, The Virgin Queen and Borat, and on the games Halo 4 and Halo 5. She presented the Radio 3 documentary Bulgaria's Voice. She has performed with Joglaresa and Balkan Beat Box.

Stefanova formed the London Bulgarian Choir in 2000, winning BBC Radio 3's Open Choir of the Year in 2006. She has led the choir to record three albums, on three tours of Bulgaria, and through collaborations with British Sea Power, Doves, the Turbans, Avshalom Caspi at the BBC Electric Proms and Nigel Kennedy.

She has been leading the Swiss Bulgarian Choir since 2011, and leads workshops in the United Kingdom, Europe and the United States. Ethnomusicologist Caroline Bithell describes her skills: "In addition to the repertoire itself and an intimate knowledge of the cultural context of the songs she introduces, one of the most valuable things Dessi has to offer is at the level of vocal technique and timbre as she guides her students through a series of exercises designed to bring them closer to the Bulgarian sound."
