= World Clash =

World Clash is an annual reggae sound system clash.

The World Sound Clash was started by World Promotion in 1993, the first clash was at the Roller express in London. Bodyguard sound system was the first world sound champion.

The World Clash started in 1998 by promoters Irish and Chin and held in a different location each year.

Precursors to World Clash include the UK World Cup which took place in 1993 and 1994 in London, and the Canada World Clash which took place in 1993 in Toronto.

== History ==
=== 1993 ===
- Location: Roller Express, Edmonton, London
- Host: Sass
- Participants:
  - (United Kingdom) Sir Coxsone
  - (United Kingdom) Saxon Studio International
  - (United States) Afrique
  - (Jamaica) Bodyguard
- Winner: Bodyguard

=== 1994 ===
- Location: Sanctuary Music Arena, Milton Keynes
- Host: Sass
- Participants:
  - (United Kingdom) Kebra Negus
  - (United Kingdom) Saxon Studio International
  - (United States) King Addies
  - (Jamaica) Bodyguard
- Winner: Saxon Studio International

=== 1998 ===
- Location: Club Amazura, Queens, New York City
- Host: Squeeze
- Participants:
  - (United Kingdom) Coxsone
  - (United States) Downbeat
  - (Jamaica) Killamanjaro
- Winner: Killamanjaro

=== 1999 ===
- Location: The Warehouse, Brooklyn, New York City
- Host: DJ Roy
- Participants:
  - (Jamaica) Bass Odyssey (no show)
  - (Jamaica) Killamanjaro
  - (Japan) Mighty Crown
  - (Jamaica) Tony Matterhorn
- Winner: Mighty Crown

=== 2000 ===
- Location: Club Amazura, Queens, New York City
- Host: DJ Roy
- Participants:
  - (Jamaica) Bass Odyssey
  - (Jamaica) Killamanjaro
  - (United States) Little Rock
  - (Germany) Pow Pow Movement
  - (Jamaica) Tony Matterhorn
  - (Japan) Mighty Crown
- Winner: Killamanjaro

=== 2001 ===
- Location: Club Amazura, Queens, New York City
- Host: Bounty Killer
- Participants:
  - (Jamaica) Bass Odyssey
  - (Jamaica) Black Kat
  - (Jamaica) King Tubbys
  - (Trinidad and Tobago) Matsimela
  - (Japan) Mighty Crown
  - (Antigua and Barbuda) Poison Dart
- Winner: Bass Odyssey

=== 2002 ===
- Location: Club Amazura, Queens, New York City
- Host: Elephant Man
- Participants:
  - (Jamaica) Bass Odyssey
  - (United States) King Agony
  - (Canada) Rebel Tone
  - (Japan) Red Spider
  - (Jamaica) Ricky Trooper
  - (Jamaica) Tony Matterhorn
- Winner: Rebel Tone

=== 2003 ===
- Location: Club Amazura, Queens, New York City
- Host: Bounty Killer
- Participants:
  - (Jamaica) Black Cat
  - (United States) King Agony
  - (Trinidad and Tobago) Matsimela
  - (Japan) Mighty Crown
  - (Italy) One Love
  - (Canada) Rebel Tone
- Winner: Black Cat

=== 2004 ===
- Location: Club Amazura, Queens, New York City
- Host: Irish and Chin
- Participants:
  - (Jamaica) Black Kat
  - (United Kingdom) Klassique
  - (United States) LP International
  - (Italy) One Love
  - (Jamaica) Ricky Trooper
  - (United States) Young Hawk
- Winner: Black Kat

=== 2005 ===
- Location: Elite Ark, Brooklyn, New York City
- Host: Noah
- Participants:
  - (Jamaica) Bass Odyssey
  - (Jamaica) Black Cat
  - (Canada) Desert Storm
  - (United Kingdom) Immortal
  - (Japan) Mighty Crown
  - (Germany) Sentinel
- Winner: Sentinel

=== 2006 ===
- Location: Club Amazura, Queens, New York City
- Host: Irish
- Participants:
  - (Jamaica) Bass Odyssey
  - (Jamaica) Black Kat
  - (Canada) Black Reaction
  - (Jamaica) Ricky Trooper
  - (Germany) Sentinel
- Winner: Bass Odyssey
