= London Bulgarian Choir =

London-based amateur choir

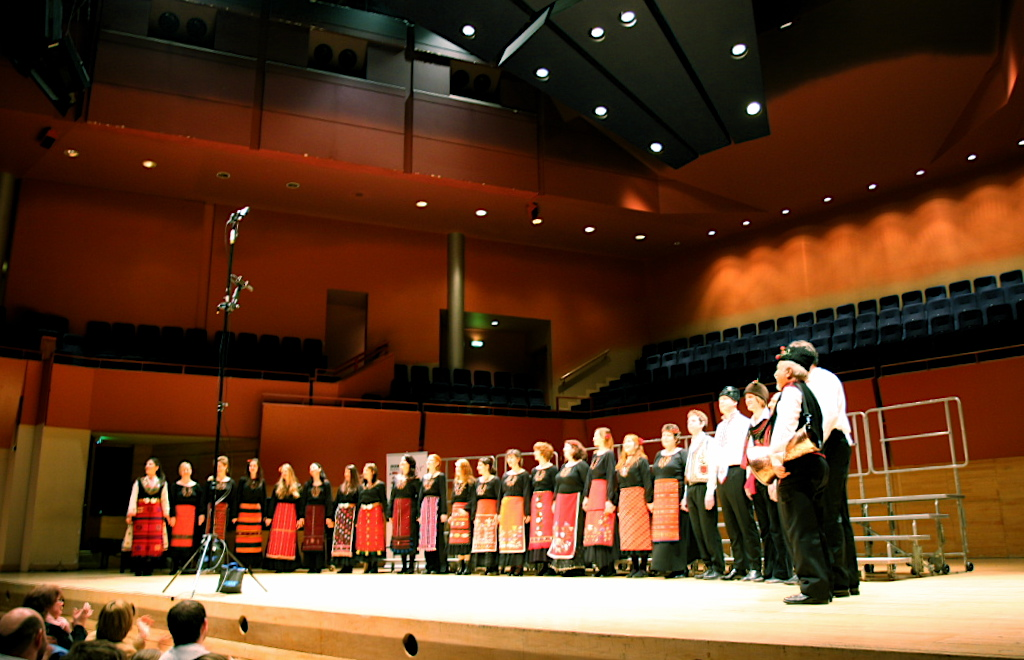
- Basingstoke leg of the BBC Radio 3 Choir of the Year competition

Background information
- Also known as: LBC
- Origin: London, England
- Genres: Bulgarian folk music
- Years active: 2000–present
- Website: londonbulgarianchoir.co.uk

The London Bulgarian Choir (LBC) is a London-based amateur choir specialising in Bulgarian folk music. Dessislava Stefanova has led the choir since its formation in 2000. Primarily a performing choir, the LBC perform around twenty concerts a year and have been involved in high-profile collaborations with British Sea Power, Doves, Orlando Gough, and Nigel Kennedy.

== History and achievements ==
=== Awards ===
LBC won the Open Choir Category of BBC Radio 3's Choir of the Year 2006 competition.

=== Tours ===
In the summer of 2005 LBC toured Bulgaria. The tour was covered in a full-page article in the British Songlines magazine and filmed for Bulgarian television. The choir returned to Bulgaria in August 2010, featuring in national press and television, and performing at the Koprivshtitsa folk festival and the Bansko jazz festival. The choir returned to Bulgaria for a third time in 2015, sang in the Netherlands and in Switzerland in 2016, and performed with violinist Nigel Kennedy in Sofia, Plovdiv and London in the autumn of the same year. In 2019, the choir toured in France and Poland.

=== Soundtracks ===
Sections of the choir contributed to the soundtracks for the 2004 Warner Bros. epic Troy, the 2005 BBC miniseries The Virgin Queen, Halo 4 in 2012 and the 2019 BBC World Service podcast Missing Cryptoqueen. The Virgin Queen soundtrack won the 2007 BASCA Ivor Novello award in the Best Television Soundtrack category.

=== Events ===
The choir has taken part in London-based events such as the Exhibition Road Music Day, Various Voices, the London Jazz Festival, Daylight Music, Unamplifire and the London Festival of Bulgarian Culture.

Outside London, the choir regularly take part in music and arts festivals, and have performed at the Hebden Bridge Arts Festival, Musicport World Music Festival, Sidmouth Folk Week, the Larmer Tree Festival, Narberth Acapella, the Good Life Festival and Smugglers Festival.

=== Collaborations ===
Composer and animateur Orlando Gough used the choir in central roles for the performances Singing River at the re-opening of the Royal Festival Hall and Shouting Gallery in the National Portrait Gallery.

Part of the choir sang with British Sea Power on BBC Two's music television program Later... with Jools Holland in January 2008 and joined them again for the Mercury Music Awards later that year. The full choir joined British Sea Power for concerts in the Roundhouse in 2008 and Regent's Park in 2009.

The choir collaborated and performed with Doves as part of the BBC Electric Proms in October 2009.

In 2012, the choir performed with Cerys Matthews, adjusting two songs from their repertoire to fit with two from Cerys' album Tir. 10 singers from the choir worked with Neil Davidge on the soundtrack to Halo 4. In 2013, the choir worked with Sophie Ellis-Bextor on the recording of the track Cry to the Beat of the Band for her album Wanderlust.

In 2016, the choir performed a series of three concerts in the UK and Bulgaria with Nigel Kennedy and Georgi Andreev (Bulgarian: Георги Андреев).

The choir were featured on the Turbans eponymous album, and sang in the National Theatre's 2018 Public Acts production of Pericles.

=== Radio ===
Dessislava Stefanova was the featured guest on Radio 3's The Choir with Aled Jones in February 2007, and presented Bulgaria's Voice on Radio 3 in 2005. Both programs included recordings of the choir in performance. The choir was featured in an episode of Joan Armatrading's Favourite Choirs on BBC Radio 4 in 2008, and in The Choral History of Britain: Singing for Everyone in 2017.

In 2019, the choir produced original music for the BBC Sounds podcast series The Missing Cryptoqueen.

== Discography ==
- Alyana Galyana, 2008
- Christmas Concert (DVD), 2009
- Goro Le Goro, 2012
- Songs of Forbidden Love, 2019
