= Gerri Peev =

British journalist

- Born: Bulgaria
- Occupation: Journalist

Gerri Peev is a Bulgarian-born, New Zealand-raised British journalist.

Peev is known for an interview for The Scotsman of Samantha Power, a foreign policy advisor to U.S. presidential candidate Barack Obama. During an interview, Power said of Obama's Democratic primary opponent Hillary Clinton: "She is a monster, too – that is off the record – she is stooping to anything." Peev included the remark in her article, despite Power's post facto declaration that it was off the record. Power resigned after the article was published.

The incident opened a debate about journalistic ethics. Peev told MSNBC "I don't know what the convention is in American journalism, but in Britain here we have very firm rules about the fact that generally, you establish whether a conversation or interview is on or off the record before it actually happens. She made some off-the-cuff remarks which were on the record. She even waited for the tape to start recording and then I think once she noticed that they were quite controversial she tried to withdraw just that very remark about Hillary allegedly being a monster". The Los Angeles Times said Peev followed "standard journalistic practice".

Peev was criticised by some American journalists. Noam Scheiber from The New Republic said: "I have never not let a source take something off the record if they asked immediately after making their comment".

Peev later appeared on MSNBC's Tucker. The host, Tucker Carlson, asked Peev why she didn't agree to Power's request to strike the unguarded remark off the record. Peev replied: "Are you really that acquiescent in the United States? In the United Kingdom journalists believe that on or off the record is a principle that's decided ahead of the interview." Peev then stated that, "If she makes a comment and decides that it's too controversial and wants to withdraw it immediately after, unfortunately if the interview is on the record, it has to go ahead."

In an unrelated problem, Nassim Taleb claims that in an article written on August 20, 2009, Peev reversed his position on global warming by portraying him as an anti-ecologist.

Peev won Scoop of the Year at the 2009 Scottish Press Awards. She joined the Daily Mail as a political correspondent in 2010.
