= UK Cup Clash =

Annual sound clash held in London

The UK Cup Clash was an annual sound clash held in London since 2001. The series, which was sponsored by BBC Radio 1Xtra, was interrupted in 2008, though plans were underway to stage it again in 2013.

== Winners ==
- 2002: Mighty Crown
- 2003: Tony Matterhorn
- 2004: Black Kat
- 2005: Mighty Crown
- 2006: Bass Odyssey
- 2007: Bass Odyssey
- 2008: Bass Odyssey
- 2009: Shashamane International
- 2014: Bass Odyssey
