= King Shiloh =

Dutch reggae sound system

King Shiloh is a roots reggae sound system from the Netherlands. According to their profile, they were "founded [...] through the inspiration of Jah Rastafari".

Their first album was released on Haile Selassie I of Ethiopia's birthday, July 23, 1997.

As well as regularly ragging their enormous system at Amsterdam's DubClubY2K, King Shiloh have a show on the city's Radio 100 FM and occasionally appear in the UK. They also play in other countries such as Germany or France or Switzerland.

== Members ==
- Jah Rootz
- Bredda Neil
- Ras Lion
- Lyrical Benjie
- President Kirky
- Billyman
- Iyah One
- Danny Red
