= Bass Odyssey =

Jamaican sound system group, founded 1989

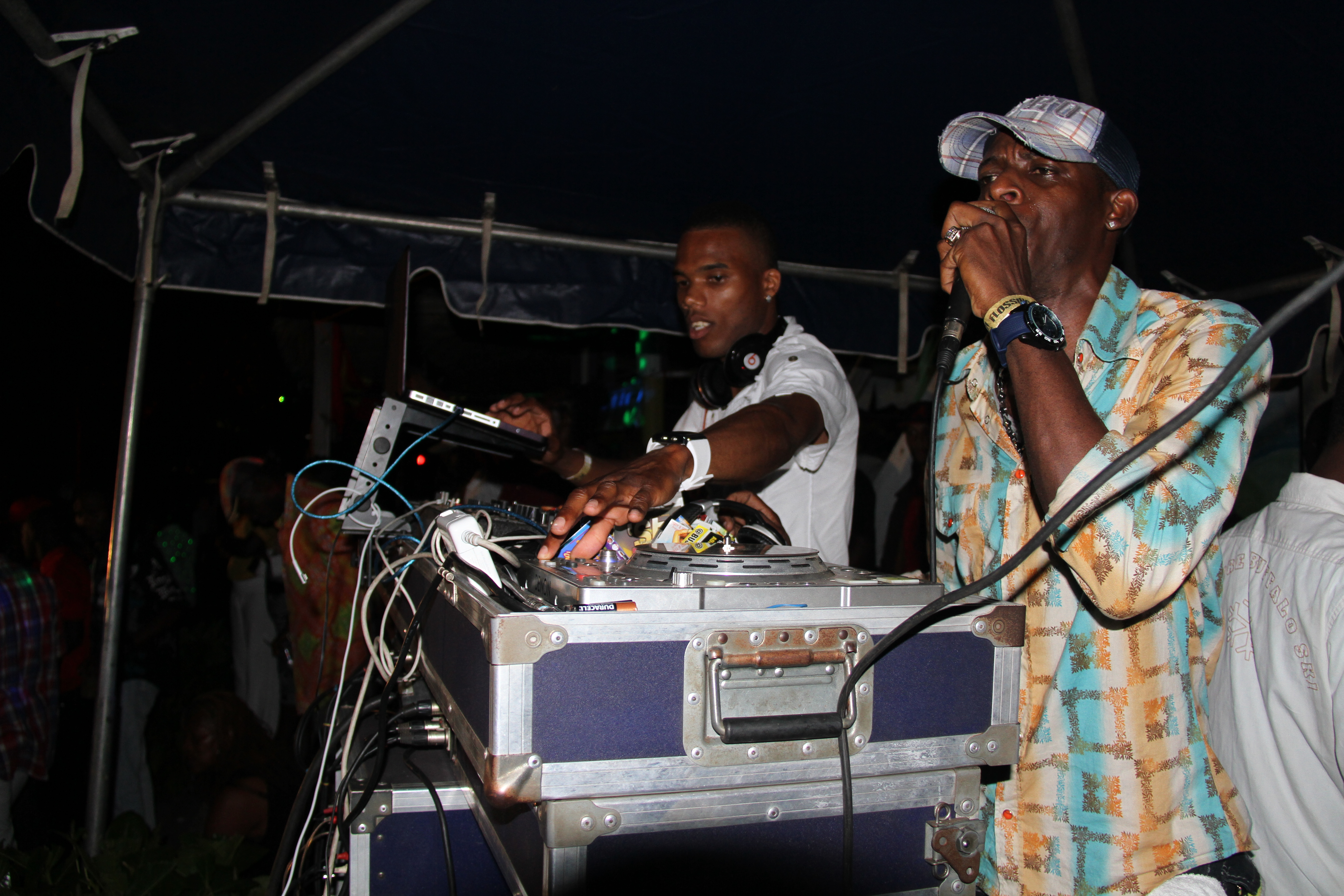
- Playing at the Annual Mothers' Day Event, 2012

Background information
- Origin: Saint Ann, Jamaica
- Genres: Reggae, dancehall
- Years active: 1989–present
- Label: Bass Odyssey Entertainment Ltd.
- Members: Worm, Dwayne, Damion, Lexxy, Harry D, Keithy Keith, Country Speng, Villy, Bishawn, Price, Frasqo, Mario, Charly Blacks, Jovi National, Teejay Di Shooter, Spread the Glory
- Past members: Kevin Squingy Bennett (1972 - 2009), Glamma G, Lenny, Tinna One, Skinny, Dj Mark, Bunny Hayles
- Website: www.facebook.com/BASSODYSSEY

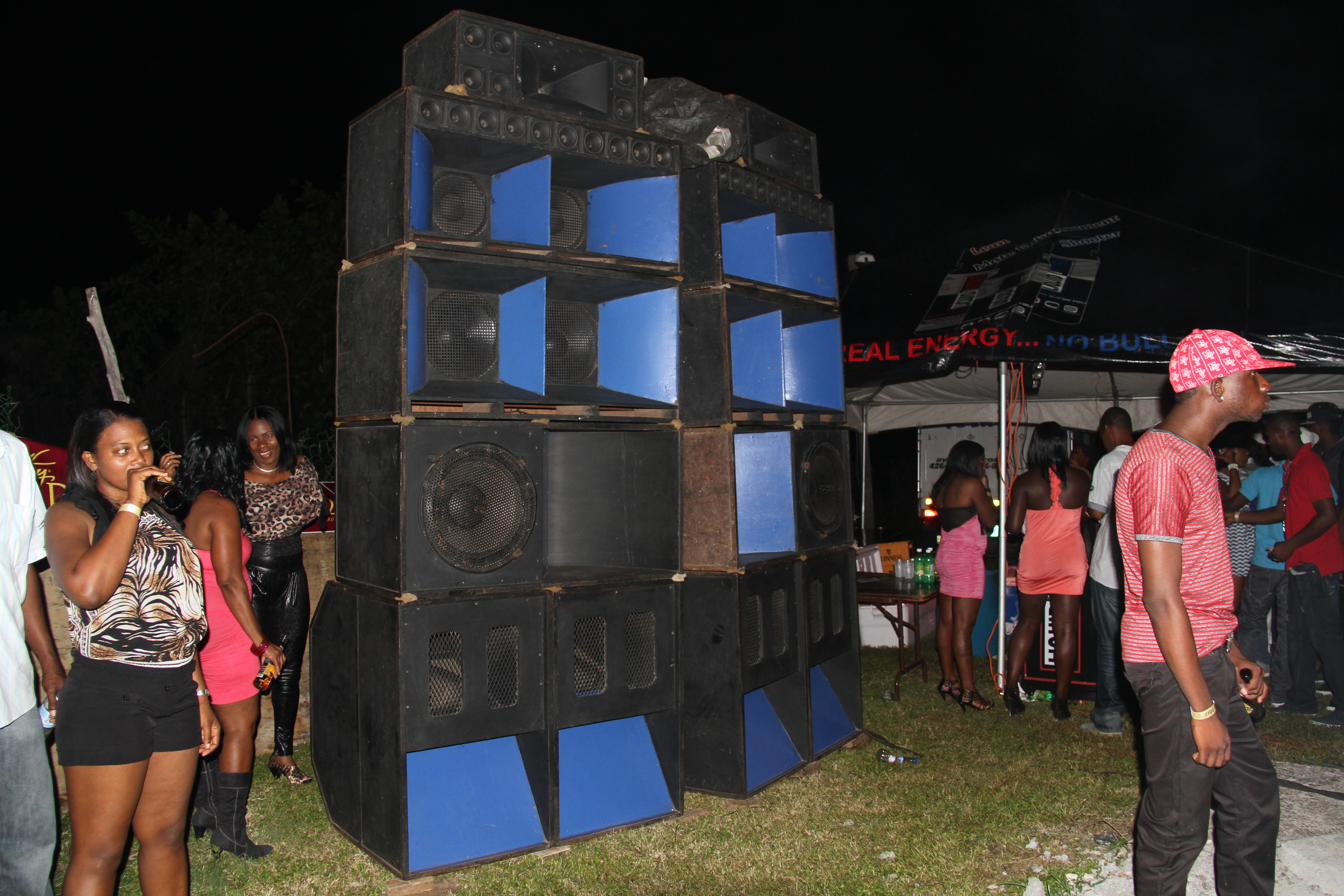
Bass Odyssey Sound System speaker column, Tropical Hut, St. Mary, May 2012

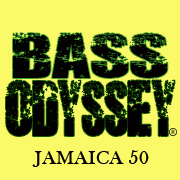
Bass Odyssey Salutes Jamaica's 50Th Anniversary

Bass Odyssey is a Jamaican reggae and dancehall sound system group founded in 1989 by Keith Walford.

== History ==
Bass Odyssey was founded in Alexandria, St. Ann, in rural Jamaica. Founder and owner Keith Walford was involved with music from a young age. After graduating from York Castle High in 1976, Walford worked as a vendor and operator of jukeboxes and gaming machines for his father's mechanic business. He played vinyl records and cassettes on his component set at small events such as weddings and birthday parties. In the mid-1980s, the Jamaican sound system scene re-emerged, which led Walford to establish the Bass Odyssey Sound System in 1989. Due to Walford's earlier work as a DJ, the exact founding date is sometimes debated. The transition to a formal sound system initially involved Walford's friend, Bunny Hayle, who served as the first official selector.

== Squidgy and Glama G ==
Bass Odyssey gained popularity for their clashing style during the sound clash era of the early to mid-1990s. Keith moved from his role as selector and MC, handing duties to Tina-One, who was later joined by Glama G. Around 1991, Kevin "Squingy" Bennett joined the team as a drum machine player. After Tina-One moved to England, Glama G and Squingy became known as "the juggling/clashing twins" due to their similar appearance and performances. During the early 1990s, the group gained a following among the Jamaican diaspora in the US, Canada, and the UK. The team expanded to include Lenny, a colleague of Glama G, and later Dwayne, Worm, and Skinny.

== Later years ==
Some members, including Bunny Hayle, Glama G, and Lenny, eventually left to pursue other ventures. Walford continued to manage the sound system. Members such as Squidgy, Worm, and DJ Mark became active in the commercial clash scene of the early to mid-2000s.

=== Kevin Squidgy Bennett ===
Selector Squidgy (Kevin Bennett) referred to himself as the "Michael Jordan" of sound clash. Bennett died in November 2009 at the age of 37 following a terminal illness.

== Recent activity ==
Bass Odyssey eventually expanded its role from a clash sound system to general music performance. In 2011, DJ Mark left the group. Leadership passed to a new team, several of whom had worked under Squidgy. Damien and Worm assumed leadership roles, while Country managed events in Jamaica and abroad.

== Bass Odyssey Sound System Festival ==
To mark its 25th anniversary, Bass Odyssey hosted a sound system festival on August 8, 2014, in Richmond, St. Ann. The annual event recognizes the role of sound systems in Jamaican culture.

=== Competitions and performances ===
Performances have included World Clash 2012 Jamaica, the David Rodigan birthday bash in 2003, and Riddim Clash 2006.

Bass Odyssey won the 2006, 2007, 2008, and 2014 UK Cup Clash Sound Clash, the New York World Clash and Jamaica World Clash in 2005, 2007, and 2012. Other wins include Guinness Sounds of Greatness 2010 and UK Tag Team Cup Clash 2010 alongside David Rodigan and One Love. In 2011, Keith Walford was elected to the Parliament of Jamaica, representing St. Ann for the People's National Party.
