= Embassy of Bulgaria, London =

Embassy of Bulgaria in London
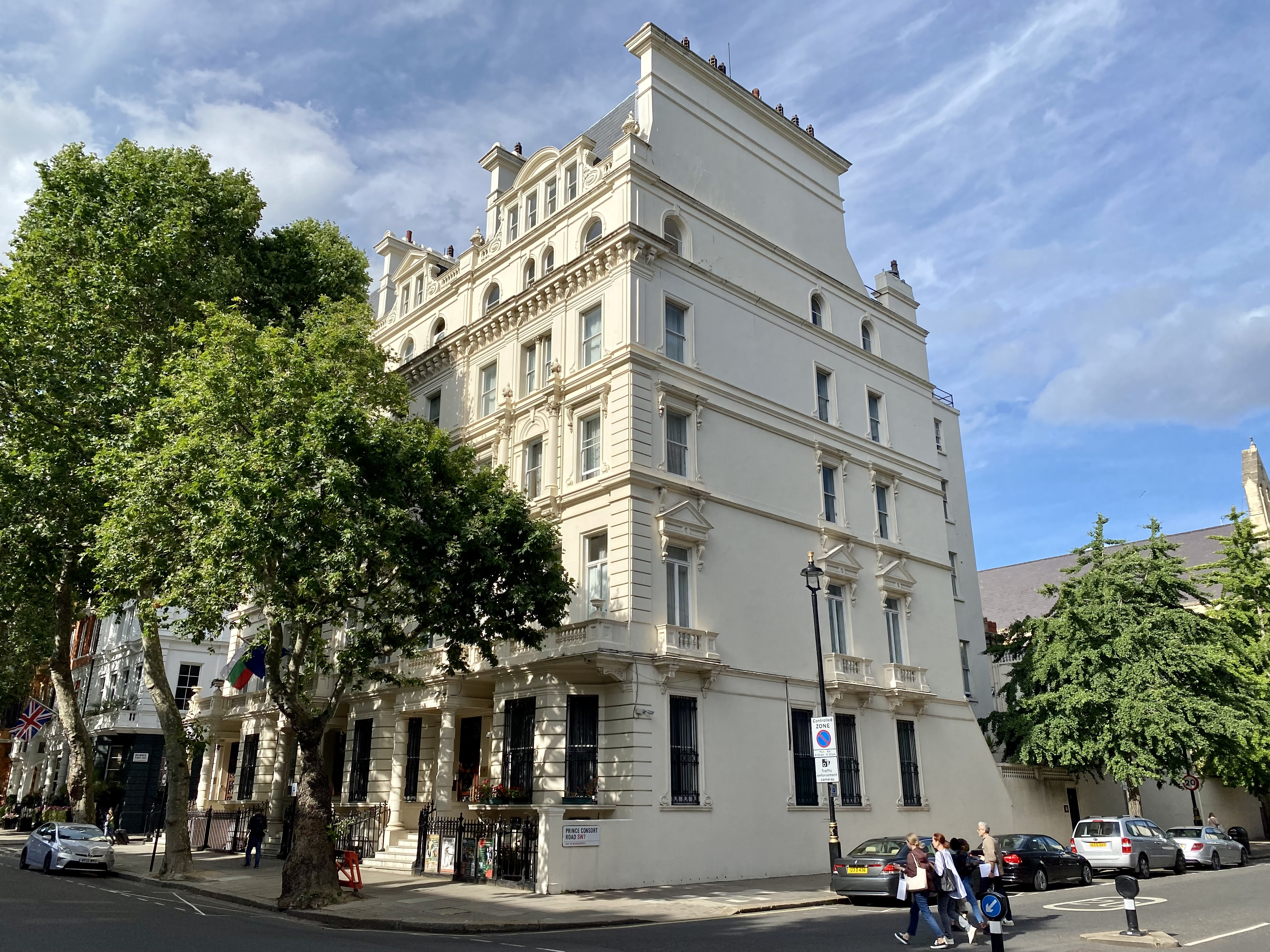
- Location: South Kensington, London
- Address: 186–188 Queen's Gate, London, SW7 5HL
- Coordinates: 51°29′59.7″N 0°10′47.1″W
- Ambassador: Tihomir Stoytchev

The Embassy of Bulgaria in London is the diplomatic mission of Bulgaria in the United Kingdom. Diplomatic relations between the two countries date from 1879 and there has been a Bulgarian embassy in London since 1903. The embassy is currently housed in a building on the east side of Queen's Gate, just within the City of Westminster, which is Grade II listed.
