= The Turbans (music group) =

London-based world music group

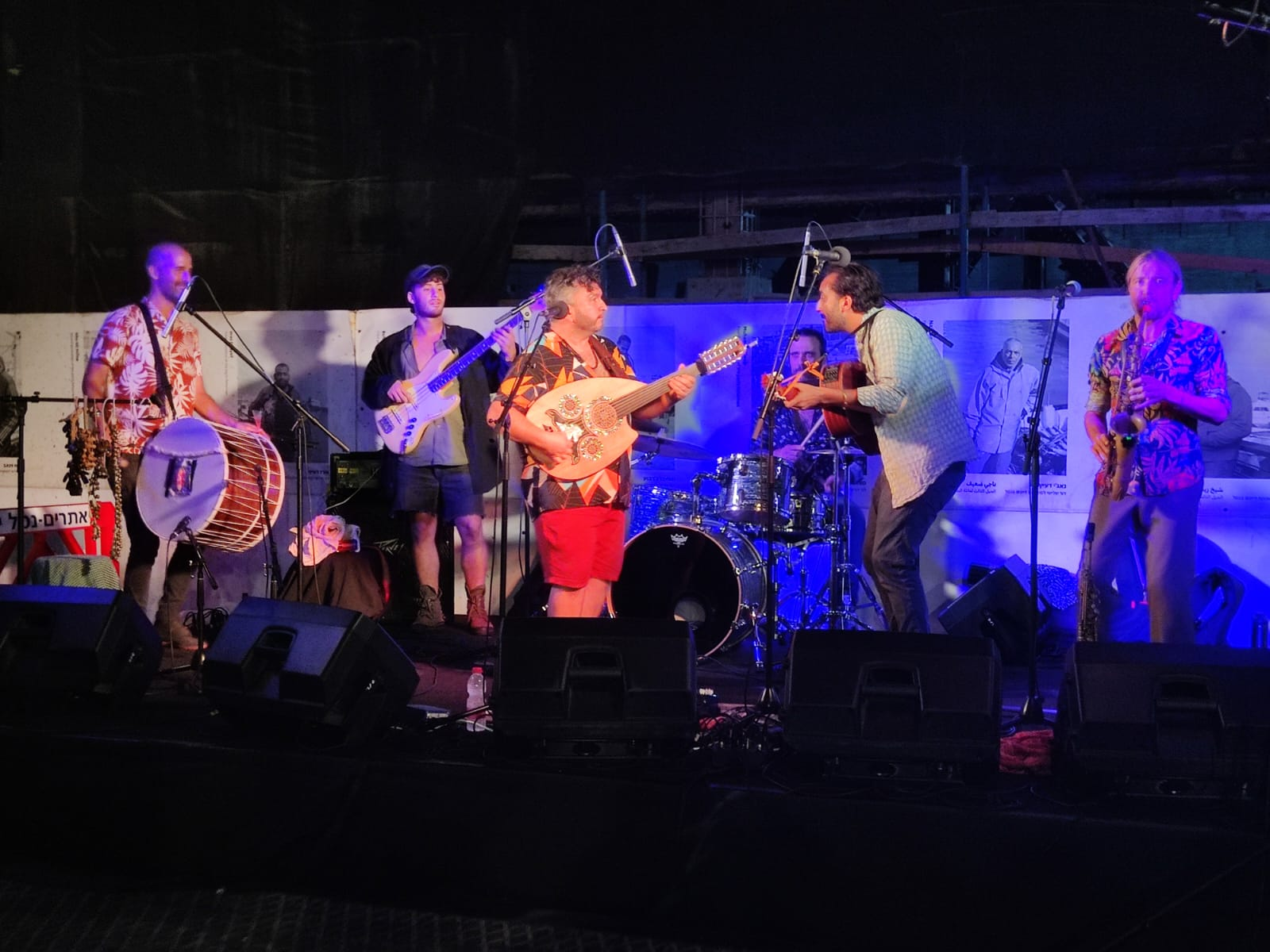
The Turbans, Jaffa Port, 2022

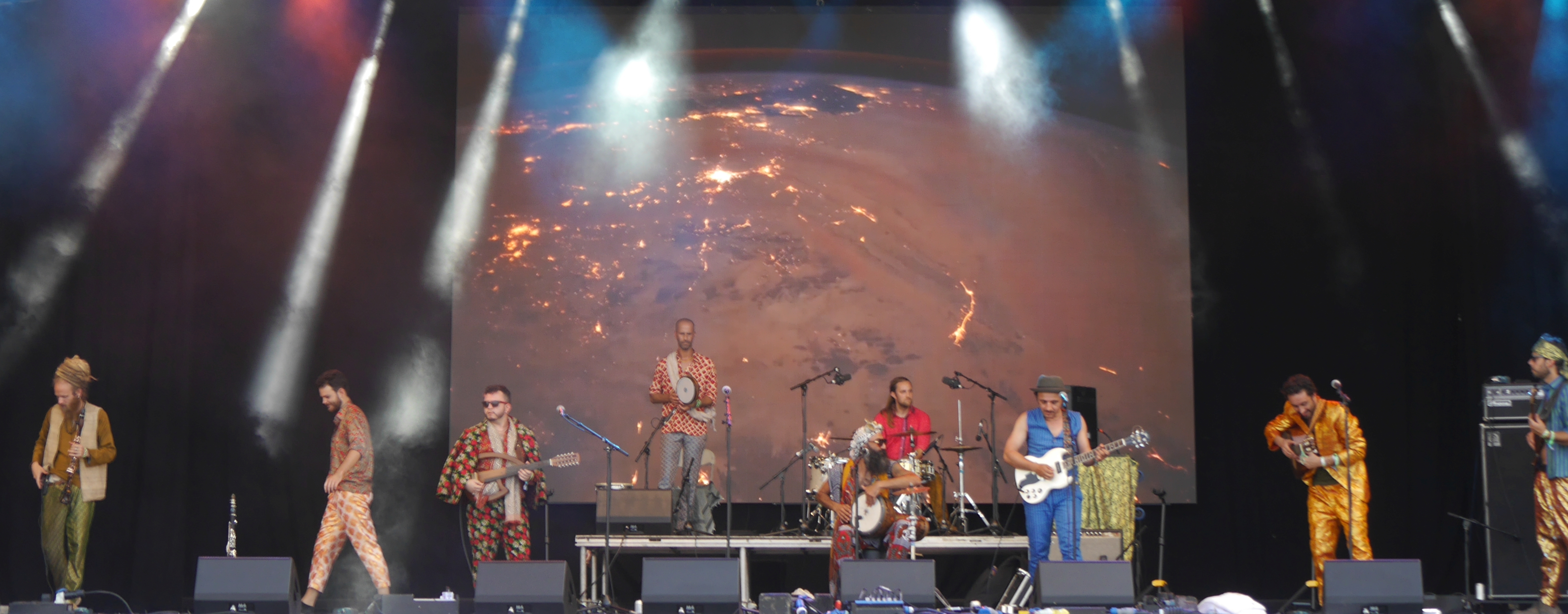
The Turbans, Glastonbury Festival, 2019

The Turbans are a London-based world music group with a core of seven members, to which others are added on an ad-hoc basis.

The Turbans began when Oshan Mahony and Darius Luke Thompson (both half-Iranian), met while cycling in Nepal. Maxim Shchedrovitzki was born in Belarus, and raised in Israel. Miroslav Morski is also a well-known pop singer in Bulgaria. The bassist Freddie Stitz was a member of Razorlight. They have all lived in the London Borough of Hackney at some point.

In April 2018, they released their eponymous debut album. In June 2019, they played the West Holts Stage at the Glastonbury Festival.
