= MC Rage =

- Birth name: Ronnie Lee
- Born: July 21, 1967 (age 58); Schweinfurt, West Germany
- Genres: Hardcore techno; drum and bass
- Occupations: Producer; emcee
- Years active: 1991–2004
- Labels: So-Real Records; D-Boy Black Label

Ronnie Lee (born July 21, 1967) is an American musician and former hardcore producer and emcee, based in Las Vegas, Nevada. Lee has performed under the stage names "MC Rage" and "Ronny Money".

== Career ==
Lee known while living in Italy stationed as a soldier, where he initiated his recording career in 1991 as Digital Boy's hype man performing as "MC Fresh" during the "Technological" tour. He continued with Digital Boy (also known as D-Boy, real name Luca Pretolesi) performing as a featured artist on several songs found on the “Futuristic” album. His first successful recording, “Revolution,” by the Italian DJ Molella, was released with little to no credit for his participation. The song was the first ever chart topping success for DJ Molella.

After his first single release in 1992 titled “Don’t You Wanna Be Free” had very little commercial success, he returned with the name “Ronny Money”, after which he achieved his first chart topping performance with “Ula La” in 1993. Still working closely with Digital Boy, Lee wrote the number one hit “The Mountain of King“ along with several other songs on Digital Boy's album “Ten Steps to the Rise” (1995). After a series of successful releases such as “Money’s Back”, “Again and Again” and “Don’t You Know” featuring Jeffrey Jey from The Bliss Team, Lee went on to host “Caos Time” on the Italian TV channel Videomusic, and a regional radio show. He made a featured appearance on Adriano Celentano's “Quel Punto“ album in 1994. This was the same year he received recognition as the Male Dance Artist of the Year.

Together with Digital Boy, Lee created D-Boy Black label in 1995 and the two focused their energy on the high speed underground techno known as hardcore. Lee used the name “MC Rage” as an artist for the first time when D-Boy Black released “Fuck Macarena” in 1996, a parody song of Los del Río's "Macarena". This song placed hardcore music in Billboard's top ten for the first time ever. Charting in The Netherlands and being released in Spain, Germany, Italy, France, Israel, Russia, Austria, UK and a number of other territories, this chart topper sold in excess of 500,000 copies.

MC Rage released several more singles and two albums which were respectable but did not achieve the commercial success of “Fuck Macarena”. In 1997, Lee parted ways with Digital Boy, establishing his own label under the name So-Real Records. By 1998 So-Real Records shared the spotlight as Italy's top hardcore label with Traxtorm Records and had become one of the most respected hardcore labels in the world. So-Real Records expanded into So-Real Music Group and was home to Combined Forces Revenge, D-Boy Black Label, HSC Records, and Ruffneck Classic, releasing what later became iconic titles such as “Hardcore For Life” and “Extreme” along with an extensive merchandising catalog.

MC Rage left music in 2004.

== Discography ==
=== Albums ===
Year	Name
2000	"Rage" (with D-Boy Bad Boys)
2003	"Chains"

=== Singles ===
Year	Single	Peak chart positions	Album
Year	Single	NED	Album
1996	"Fuck Macarena"	8	Singles only
1997	"Rave Machine"	—	Singles only
1998	"Santa Claus Is Hardcore"	—	Singles only
1998	"Two the Hard Way"	—	Singles only
1999	"No Lie"	—	
2000	"Akkur" (with Digital Boy)	—	
2002	"September Forever" (with Digital Boy & DJ Bike)	—	
2002	"Still Real"	—	
2003	"Chains"	—	
"—" denotes releases that did not chart
