= David Rodigan =

British reggae and dancehall DJ (born 1951)

David Rodigan MBE OD
- Also known as: Roddy, Ram Jam
- Born: David Michael Rodigan; 24 June 1951 (age 75); Hanover, West Germany
- Origin: Oxford, Oxfordshire, England
- Genres: Reggae, dancehall
- Occupations: Radio presenter, DJ, actor

David Michael "Ram Jam" Rodigan MBE OD (born 24 June 1951) is a British radio DJ who also performs as a disc jockey. Known for his selections of reggae and dancehall music, he has played on stations including Radio London, Capital 95.8, Kiss 100, BBC Radio 1Xtra, BBC Radio 2, and BFBS Radio.

== Life ==
Rodigan was born on a military base in Hanover, Germany. His mother was Irish and his father was Scottish and had fought in the Second World War. He attended Gosford Hill School, Kidlington, Oxfordshire.

He has stated that his passion for Jamaican music was initiated by watching Millie Small perform her 1964 hit "My Boy Lollipop" at the Ready Steady Go! TV show as a schoolboy. By the age of 15, Rodigan was DJing at school dances and youth clubs. Leaving school in 1970, he spent a year studying economics before leaving to study drama. Despite pursuing an acting career, Rodigan kept his passion for music alive, selling records in Oxford then Putney, before obtaining a job on Radio London in 1978 to alternate with Tony Williams on the Reggae Rockers programme. A year later he was offered a permanent slot at Capital Radio to present Roots Rockers, which ran for 11 years. In 1990 a change in management and music policy at the station led to Rodigan leaving to start a new show for Kiss FM when it relaunched that September as London's first legal 24-hour dance music station. He hosted the Sunday-night slot from 11pm till midnight until November 2012, when the slot was moved to midnight and he resigned in protest over what he called the "continued marginalisation" of the reggae genre.

Rodigan has clashed established soundsystems like Killamanjaro, Stone Love, Barry G and Bass Odyssey. Rodigan was the winner of World Clash 2012, in which he competed with international soundsystems at Club Amazura, New York.

During the 1980s Rodigan hosted a long-running residency at Gossips nightclub in Soho, London, in collaboration with fellow DJ Donald "Papa Face" Facey.

He has acted as tour DJ for reggae and dancehall artists including Shinehead. During the 1970s and 1980s, he worked as an actor and appeared in films and a variety of TV programmes, including roles in The Office Party (1976) and the Doctor Who serial, The Trial of a Time Lord (1986). In 1984 he joined BFBS (British Forces Broadcasting Service) where he broadcast his weekly reggae show for 25 years until 2009. In 2006, Rodigan was added to the Radio Academy hall of fame. Vocal samples of Rodigan can be found on the dubstep track "Hard" by Breakage, on the introductory track of Caspa's 2009 album Everybody's Talking, Nobody's Listening, and on the intro to Alborosie's debut album Soul Pirate, and the main vocal of Sukh Knight's "Ganja", and other jungle/drum & bass tracks. Ad-Rock mentions Rodigan by name on the 2011 Beastie Boys track "Say It". He is also name-checked on Stylo G's 2014 single "Move Back".

He is the DJ for RamJam FM in Grand Theft Auto: Episodes from Liberty City.

He was winner of the Best Specialist Music Programme award at the Sony Radio Awards in 2012 for his BBC Radio 2 show, having won the same award in 2009 for his reggae show on Kiss FM He has hosted a two-hour Sunday show on BBC Radio 1Xtra since 17 February 2013, and has hosted summer series on BBC Radio 2 since 2011. Rodigan said: "I am absolutely delighted to be joining BBC Radio 1Xtra where I can share my passion for both new cutting-edge reggae and classic cuts, reflecting a genre of music which continues to play a paramount role in urban bass culture music."

For 2014's Red Bull Culture Clash, Rodigan joined forces with Chase & Status, Shy FX and MC Rage to form the soundsystem Rebel Sound. They went on to win the clash, defeating fellow crews Stone Love, Boy Better Know and A$AP Mob.

Rodigan was appointed Member of the Order of the British Empire (MBE) in the 2012 New Year Honours for services to broadcasting, and in 2020 was awarded the (Jamaican) Order of Distinction "for outstanding service to the promotion of Jamaican Music across the world". He stated he was "blown away" by the honour.
