= Killamanjaro =

Jamaican sound system

- Also known as: Jaro; The highest Mountain
- Origin: Jamaica
- Genres: Reggae, dancehall
- Members: Noel Harper; Genious; Problem Sean; Jeremy Lee; Mophead; Hype; Crazy D Ricky Trooper; Freddy Krueger; Ainsley
- Website: killamanjaro.com

Founded in the summer of 1969, Killamanjaro is a Jamaican sound system best known for their clashes and large amount of classic reggae dubplates.

It is owned by Noel "Papa Jaro" Harper and named after Mount Kilimanjaro. The name was changed to "Killamanjaro" after having established a reputation of being a good clash sound.

"Jaro" is notable for being a top sound in both the live-artist era of the 1980s, where it launched the careers of top dancehall artists at the time, such as Early B, Super Cat, Jim Kelly, Burro Banton, Puddy Roots, and Ninjaman, and the 1990s dubplate era, where the sound went on a soundclash killing spree behind selector/mic man Ricky Trooper.

Killamanjaro have played globally, including winning the World Clash twice and touring the United States, Europe and Japan. They were also involved with what many consider the "greatest clash of all-time", King Addies (USA) vs. Killamanjaro (Jamaica).

In 1999, Killamanjaro released a tribute album to Garnett Silk, Killamanjaro remembers Garnett Silk.
