= Ock =

Ock or OCK may refer to:

- River Ock (disambiguation), three rivers in England
- Ok (Korean name), also spelt Ock
  - Ock Joo-hyun (born 1980), South Korean K-pop singer and musical theatre actress
- General Ock, an American bodega cook and internet personality from Brooklyn, New York
- Océano Club de Kerkennah, a Tunisian football club
- Ockendon railway station, Essex, England (National Rail station code OCK)
- Olympique Club de Khouribga, a Moroccan football club
- Olympic Committee of Kosovo

== See also ==
- Doctor Octopus, an enemy of Spider-Man often called "Doc Ock"
- Oakland County Child Killer serial killer (Detroit).
