= Rahim =

رحيم
- Romanisation: Raḥīm
- Pronunciation: [raħiːm]
- Gender: Male

Origin
- Language: Arabic
- Meaning: Merciful
- Region of origin: Arabian Peninsula

Other names
- Cognate: Rahman
- Anglicisations: Rahim, Raheem
- Derivatives: Abul Rahim, Atta Ur Rahim
- Derived: R-Ḥ-M root

Rahim (Raḥīm رحيم, also anglicized as Raheem) is an Arabic word meaning "Merciful", from the root R-Ḥ-M. Al-Rahim (the Merciful) is one of the attributes of God according to Islam. It is a male given name, sometimes a hypocorism for Abdu r-Raḥīm "Servant of the Merciful". Spellings include Rahim, Raheem, Rohim and Roheem.

== Given name ==
- Abdul Rahim Khan-i-Khanan (1556–1627), poet and minister in the Mughal Empire
- Rahim Abdullah (born 1976), American football player
- Rahim Abdullah (Malaysian footballer) (1947–2025), Malaysian football player
- Rahim Ademi (born 1954), Croatian Army general
- Rahim Asani, Pakistan-born American politician
- Raheem Beyah (born 1976), American computer scientist
- Raheem Blackshear (born 1999), American football player
- Raheem J. Brennerman (born 1978), American businessman
- Raheem Brock (born 1978), American football player
- Raheem Givens (born 1993), Jamaican Photographer/Director
- Rahim Jaffer (born 1971), Canadian politician
- Rahim Jahani (died 2014), Afghan singer
- Raheem Jarbo (born 1977), rapper better known as "Mega Ran"
- Raheem Kassam (born 1983), British politician and journalist
- Raheem Layne (born 1999), American football player
- Rahim Mehryar (1956–2010), Afghan singer
- Rahim Mohamed, Yemeni-American bodega cook and internet personality
- Rahim Moore (born 1990), American football player
- Raheem Morris (born 1976), American football coach
- Raheem Mostert (born 1992), American football player
- Raheem Orr (born 1986), American football player
- Raheim Sanders (born 2002), American football player
- Raheem Sterling (born 1994), English football player
- Rahim Ullah (died 1861), Bengali rebel
- Rahim Zafer (born 1971), Turkish football player

== Surname ==
- Esther Rahim (1904–1963), Pakistani painter
- Hafiz Rahim (1983–2020), Singaporean footballer
- Mohd Safiq Rahim (born 1987), Malaysian footballer
- Mushfiqur Rahim (born 1987), Bangladeshi cricketer
- Sameer Rahim, British literary journalist and novelist
- Tahar Rahim (born 1981), French actor
- Zara Rahim, American communications strategist and political adviser

== In fiction ==
- Rahim Aldemir, from Dying Light
- Raheem Porter, from Juice (1992 film)

== See also ==
- Radio Raheem, a character in the film Do The Right Thing
- Rahimuddin Khan, Pakistani general
- Rahman, elative of Rahim
