= Andrew Cogliano =

Canadian ice hockey player (born 1987)

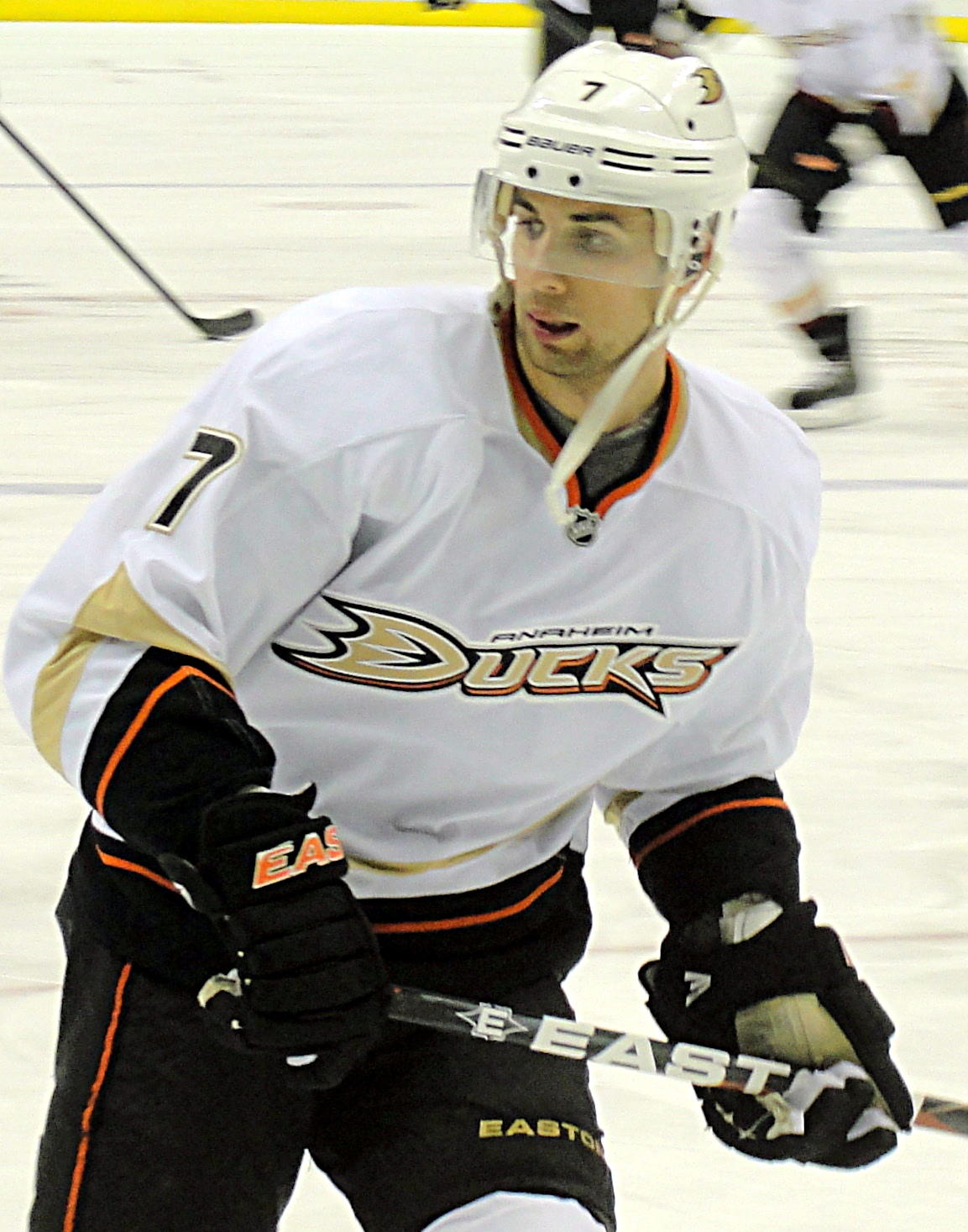
- Cogliano with the Anaheim Ducks in 2012
- Born: June 14, 1987 (age 39) Toronto, Ontario, Canada
- Height: 5 ft 10 in (178 cm)
- Weight: 175 lb (79 kg; 12 st 7 lb)
- Position: Centre / Left wing
- Shot: Left
- Played for: Edmonton Oilers; Anaheim Ducks; EC KAC; Dallas Stars; San Jose Sharks; Colorado Avalanche
- NHL draft: 25th overall, 2005; Edmonton Oilers
- Playing career: 2007–2024

Andrew Cogliano (born June 14, 1987) is a Canadian former professional ice hockey player who played for the Edmonton Oilers, Anaheim Ducks, Dallas Stars, San Jose Sharks, and Colorado Avalanche of the National Hockey League (NHL). On December 31, 2013, Cogliano became the 20th player in NHL history to play 500 consecutive games, and only the fifth to do so from the beginning of his NHL career. On November 4, 2017, Cogliano played in his 800th consecutive game, placing him in fourth place on the NHL's most consecutive games played list. The streak ended at 830 games on January 14, 2018, when Cogliano was suspended for two games. Cogliano won the Stanley Cup with the Avalanche in 2022.

== Early life ==
Cogliano was born on June 14, 1987, in Toronto, Ontario, to parents Carm and Theresa. His father worked for the Toronto Parks, Forestry and Recreation Division while his mother worked as a fitness instructor and a preschool teacher. He began skating at the age of four after watching his older brother Matthew but also played soccer until he was 15 years old. Growing up, Cogliano attended St. Michael's College School from Grade 7 to Grade 13.

== Playing career ==
=== Amateur ===
Cogliano started playing select ice hockey for the Richmond Hill Vaughan Kings in the North York Hockey League. As a member of the Vaughan Kings AA team, Cogliano played in the 2001 Quebec International Pee-Wee Hockey Tournament. He then advanced to the Vaughan Kings AAA team for the 2002–03 season, where he recorded 21 goals and 34 assists through 34 games. Although he was a high ranked prospect heading into the 2003 Ontario Hockey League (OHL) Priority Selection draft, Cogliano informed teams he was considering playing college hockey instead of major junior. He was eventually drafted in the third round, 54th overall, by the Toronto St. Michael's Majors.

As a St. Michael's College School student, Cogliano played for their U14 team and the Double Blues before finishing with the St. Michael's Buzzers in the Ontario Junior Hockey League (OJHL). As a member of the Double Blues, Cogliano surpassed Jason Spezza's points-per-game program record en route to the 2003 Goetz Classic Cup. After scoring a goal and two assists in the championship game, Cogliano was named the game's MVP. In his first season with the Buzzers, Cogliano finished second on the team with 26 goals and 46 assists for 72 points. After adding 11 goals and 21 assists in the playoffs, he was also named the 2004 OPJHL-South Rookie of the Year and one of the OHA's Top Prospects. Cogliano finished his career with the Buzzers as the program's leader in assists, points, three-goal games, and four-goal games. While he was originally ranked 63rd by the NHL Central Scouting Bureau, changes to the NHL's rulebook post lockout raised his stocks among scouts. As such, he was drafted in the first round, 25th overall, by the Edmonton Oilers in the 2005 NHL entry draft.

=== Collegiate ===
Following the 2005 draft, Cogliano enrolled in the University of Michigan's School of Kinesiology and joined the Michigan Wolverines men's ice hockey team for two seasons. While the Wolverines started the 2005–06 season with a 4–0–0 record, Cogliano's first collegiate point came in his fourth game of the season. As he was struggling to score, Cogliano was gifted an Easton Synergy stick, the same one he used in juniors, before his fourth game of the season. In that game, on October 16, he scored his first collegiate power-play and game-winning goal against the Merrimack Warriors. Through the first 17 games of the season, Cogliano played on the Wolverine's third line with fellow freshmen Travis Turnbull and Tim Miller. Over two games in the first week of November, Cogliano recorded three goals and three assists to maintain his six-game scoring streak. He was subsequently recognised by the Central Collegiate Hockey Association (CCHA) as the conference's Rookie of the Week on November 7. He ranked third on the team in scoring with 19 points through his first 17 games but struggled after returning from the 2006 World Junior Ice Hockey Championships. Cogliano finished the season with 28 points in 39 games and was named to the 2005–06 CCHA All-Rookie team.

Cogliano improved on his freshman scoring total upon returning to the Wolverines for the 2006–07 season. He began December with his first NCAA hat-trick to maintain his team lead in scoring with 12 goals. However, he then missed numerous games in December due to a shoulder injury and the 2007 World Junior Ice Hockey Championships. Unlike the previous season, Cogliano had time to recover after the World Juniors and quickly returned to his scoring prowess. In his first seven games back with the Wolverines, Cogliano tallied five goals and extended his scoring streak to a career-best 12 games. Cogliano finished his sophomore season tied for seventh in the conference with 24 goals and eighth with 50 points. On May 2, 2007, he officially concluded his collegiate career by signing a professional contract with the Edmonton Oilers.

=== Professional ===
==== Edmonton Oilers (2007–2011) ====
Leading up to the 2007–08 season, Cogliano had a strong training camp and made the Oilers' opening night roster. He made an immediate impact in his NHL debut on October 4, 2007, by tallying his first NHL assist in the Oilers' 3–2 win over the San Jose Sharks. He added another assist in his second game before scoring his first NHL goal on October 8, 2007, against the Detroit Red Wings. By October 15, Cogliano led the Oilers in scoring with five points. However, his scoring rate began to decline as the season continued and he adjusted to the NHL's 82-game schedule. Before the league's three-day Christmas break, Cogliano ranked fourth on the Oilers with six goals and 10 assists and seventh among all NHL rookies. In mid-January, Cogliano began centering the Oilers' "Kid line" with Sam Gagner and Robert Nilsson to boost scoring among the trio. They were referred to as the "Kid line" as all three were under the age of 24. By the start of March, Cogliano had scored 13 goals and was tied with Gagner for fourth on the team with 35 points. On March 11, 2008, Cogliano set an NHL record by scoring overtime goals in three consecutive games. His stick and gloves were subsequently sent to the Hockey Hall of Fame. Over the final 20 game of the season, Cogliano recorded nine goals and eights assists as the Oilers maintained a 14-5-1 record. The "Kid line" was largely credited for the Oilers' playoff push in the second half of the season, although they would ultimately fall short of qualifying for the 2008 Stanley Cup playoffs. He finished his rookie season with 18 goals and 27 assists and was ninth in Calder Memorial Trophy voting for the NHL's Rookie of the Year.

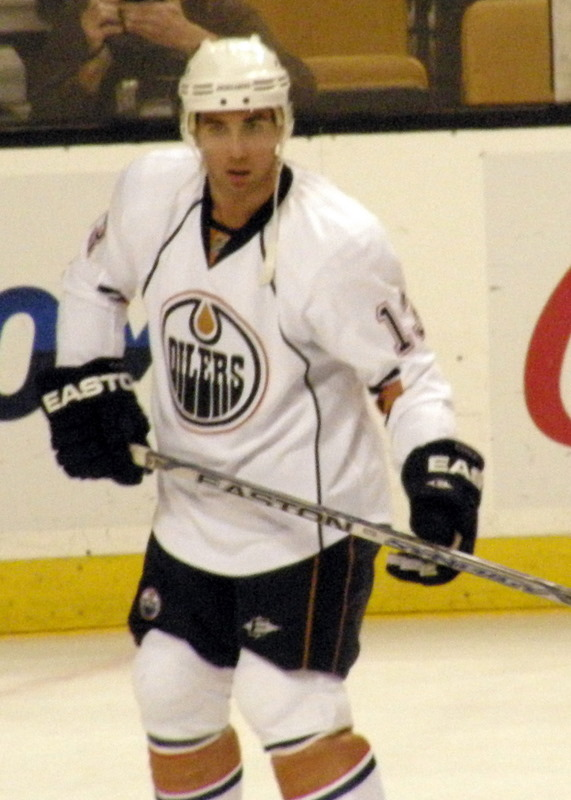
Cogliano with the Oilers in 2009.

While the "Kid line" was reunited to start the 2008-09 season, they were occasionally split up over October and November due to scoring lapses. Oilers coach Craig MacTavish was critical of the line's lack of success and said he was "not totally convinced" on their usefulness. He eventually split up the line and moved Cogliano into a winger position with Shawn Horcoff and Dustin Penner. After returning from the holiday break, Cogliano scored four goals over seven games to tie Sheldon Souray for the team lead with 12. As such, he was invited to represent the Sophomore team in the NHL YoungStars Game at the 2009 National Hockey League All-Star Game. He also participated won the "Fastest Skater" competition during the SuperSkills event, clocking in at a time of 14.31 seconds. However, before and after returning from the All-Star Game, Coglaino experienced a 16-game scoring drought that was snapped in mid-February. By March, Cogliano had tallied 16 goals and 34 points while averaging 14:57 minutes per game. He added two goals by the end the season to match his rookie-season total of 18 goals but failed to match his previous season's point total. In June 2009, Cogliano was confirmed to be a part of a planned trade that would include Ladislav Šmíd and Dustin Penner being sent to the Ottawa Senators in exchange for Dany Heatley. However, Heatley ultimately exercised the no-trade clause in his contract and the deal did not materialize.

Cogliano struggled in the 2009–10 season, as his offensive production continued to decline. He recorded 14 points over his first 64 games before being paired with Gilbert Brulé in March. Upon gaining Brulé as his linemate, Cogliano scored seven points over seven games. He finished with 10 goals and 18 assists through 82 games and signed a one-year contract extension with the Oilers on September 10, 2010.

Cogliano struggled at the start of the 2010–11 season and scored only five points through his first 21 games while also suffering numerous facial injuries. Despite suffering a severely bruised jaw, broken nose, and split lip, Cogliano did not miss a single game. By January, Cogliano had only scored four goals and 13 points through 39 games and had a team-worst minus-12. After Tom Gilbert suffered a late-season injury, Cogliano secured the team's active ironman record by playing in 326th consecutive NHL game. He finished the season with 11 goals and 24 assists for 35 points. On July 12, 2011, Cogliano was traded to the Anaheim Ducks in exchange for a second-round draft pick in the 2013 NHL entry draft.

==== Anaheim Ducks (2011–2019) ====
On July 19, 2011, Cogliano signed a three-year, $7.17-million contract with the Ducks. On January 31, 2012, Cogliano scored three goals in six minutes and 51 seconds to lift the Ducks 4–1 over the Phoenix Coyotes. This made his first NHL hat-trick the second fastest in franchise history, second only to Bobby Ryan's. However, he then went goalless until February 26, when he scored in a 3–1 win over the Chicago Blackhawks. A few days later, on March 2, he played in his 393rd consecutive game to tie Jarome Iginla on the NHL's active ironman list. Cogliano finished his first year with the team with 13 goals and 13 assists through 82 games.

Due to the 2012–13 NHL lockout, Cogliano and former teammate Sam Gagner played for the EC KAC in the Erste Bank Eishockey Liga. By the time the lockout ended, he ranked 10th in the league with two goals and four assists through seven games. Upon rejoining the Ducks, Cogliano was converted into a winger on a line with Saku Koivu and Daniel Winnik. While he began the season with back-to-back two point games against Calgary and Vancouver, he struggled with consistent scoring throughout the season. Cogliano scored his second NHL hat-trick on March 2 against the Coyotes but the Ducks lost the game 5–4 in a shootout. He scored three more goals over the final 22 games of the regular season to finish with 13 goals and 10 assists. His efforts helped the Ducks capture their first Pacific Division title since 2007 and qualify for the 2013 Stanley Cup playoffs. Cogliano made his Stanley Cup playoffs debut in Game 1 against the Detroit Red Wings and recorded his first playoff point, an assist, in Game 4. This would be his only point over the seven-game series.

Cogliano again found success when reunited with Koivu and Winnik to start the 2013–14 season, and quickly tied his previous season's total by the end of December. In his 500th consecutive NHL game on December 31, Cogliano tallied his 12th goal of the season to lead the Ducks 3–2 over the San Jose Sharks. He subsequently became the fifth player in NHL history to play in 500 consecutive games starting at his NHL debut. Shortly after reaching this milestone, Cogliano signed a four-year, $12-million extension with the Ducks. He scored his 100th career NHL goal on January 25 in the 2014 NHL Stadium Series against the Los Angeles Kings. He finished the regular season with a career-high 21 goals and 21 assists to help the Ducks finish first in the Western Conference and qualify for the 2014 Stanley Cup playoffs. Once the playoffs began, Cogliano and the Ducks faced off against the Dallas Stars in the Western Conference first round. In Game 2, Cogliano became the sixth player in franchise history to score a short-handed goal in the playoffs. He later assisted on Nick Bonino's overtime goal in Game 6 to help the Ducks advance to the second round. Despite pushing the Kings to seven-games, the Ducks were eliminated from playoff contention on May 16, 2014.

During the 2014–15 season, Cogliano earned more on-ice responsibility and was entrusted on the Ducks powerplay unit. Due to a League-wide mumps outbreak, various games were postponed and the Ducks cancelled numerous public appearances for health and sanitary reasons. To avoid getting sick, Cogliano used sterile liquid to sanitize his mouthguard in between periods. As he remained healthy, Cogliano overtook Jay Bouwmeester for the league's active Ironman streak after the latter suffered an injury on November 23. Despite playing in every game, Cogliano was limited to only four goals and five assists through the first three months of the season. On February 21, Cogliano played in his 600th consecutive NHL game while helping the Ducks secure a 2–1 win over the Edmonton Oilers. He became the eighth player in NHL history to maintain a consecutive games-play streak of 600 games or more over their NHL career, but only the third to do so in over two decades. The following month, Cogliano secured the Ducks franchise record for most consecutive games played for the franchise. He played in his 277th consecutive game as a Duck on March 3, 2015, against the Arizona Coyotes. Cogliano finished the regular season with 15 goals and 14 assists, which helped the Ducks qualify for the 2015 Stanley Cup playoffs. He scored three assists in Game 3 of the Western Conference first round to help lead the Ducks to an eventual series sweep of the Winnipeg Jets. Cogliano and the Ducks then faced the Calgary Flames in the second round, whom they eliminated in five games. In Game 1 of the Western Conference final against the Blackhawks, Cogliano's line with Nate Thompson and Kyle Palmieri combined to score the game tying and winning goals. He finished the postseason with a career-high three goals and six assists through 16 playoff games. At the end of the season, he was the Ducks nominee for the Bill Masterton Memorial Trophy but lost to Devan Dubnyk.

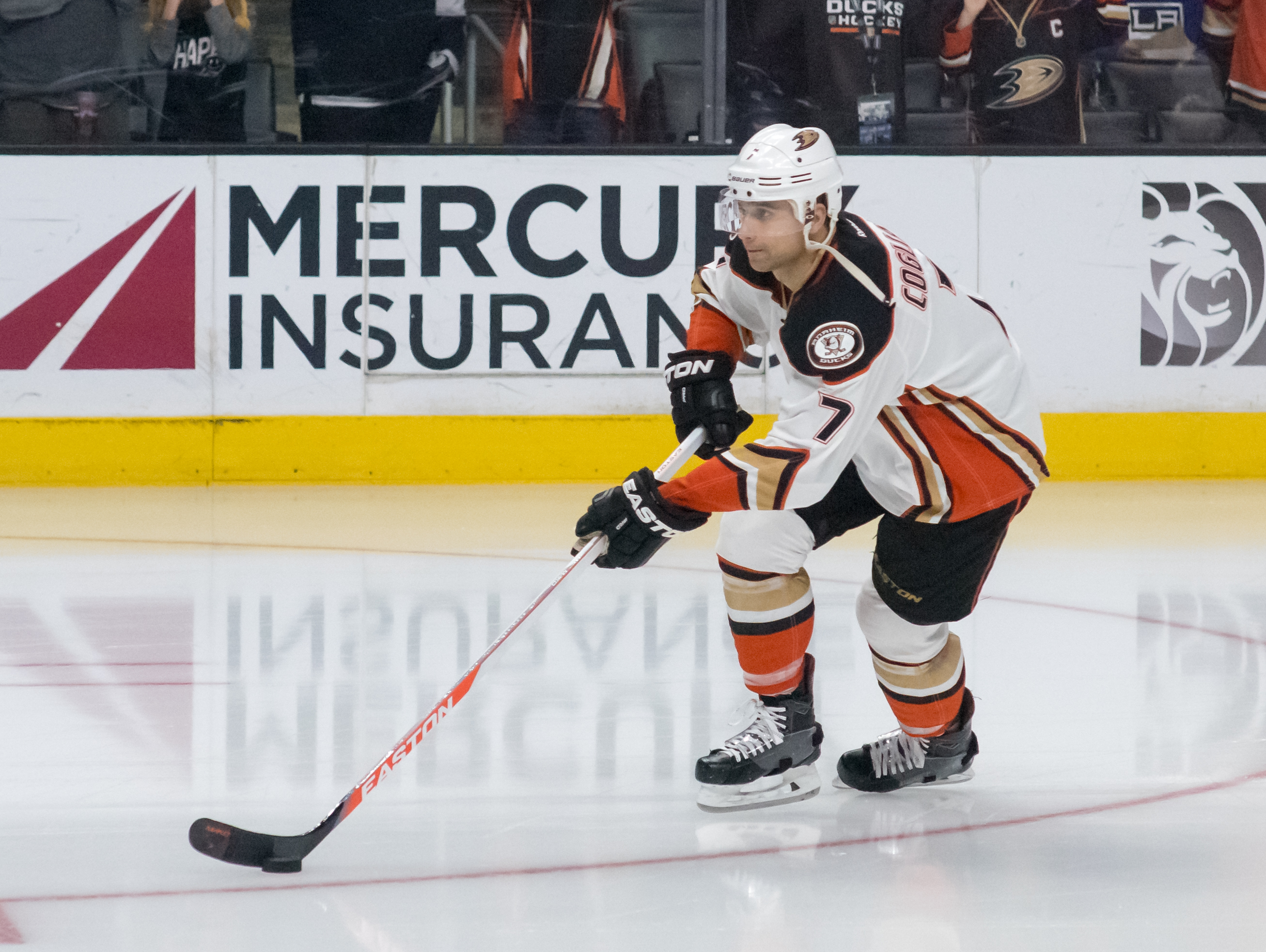
Cogliano during his tenure with the Ducks.

Following the offseason departure of Palmieri, Cogliano played on the Ducks' "shutdown" line with Ryan Kesler and Jakob Silfverberg for the majority of the 2015–16 season. The trio earned this nickname as their defensive play helped nullify the other team's best offensive players. However, all three began the season goalless through the Ducks' first 10 games. On October 26, Cogliano played in his 630th consecutive game to tie Andy Hebenton for the second-longest streak in league history since the start of an NHL career. While he was never pulled out of the Ducks lineup, Cogliano's struggles offensively continued throughout the season. After breaking a 17-game scoreless streak on January 15, 2016, against the Ottawa Senators, Cogliano secured ninth place on the franchise's all-time scoring list. On April 3, Cogliano became the second player in NHL history to play in 700 consecutive games since the start his NHL career. He finished the regular season with 23 assists and a career-low nine goals through 82 games and ranked second among Ducks forwards in hits. He was again nominated by the Ducks for the Bill Masterton Trophy but was not named one of the finalists.

Cogliano was reunited with Kesler and Silfverberg for the 2016–17 season and they were again responsible for shutting down their opposition's top lines. During the season, Cogliano continued to climb the NHL's all-time consecutive games played list and ended the regular season in fourth place. He also hit other milestones during the season, including recording his 300th career point, his 100th career assist, and playing in his 400th game as a Duck. His efforts again helped lead the Ducks to the Stanley Cup playoffs, where he scored the game-tying goal in the Ducks' Game 7 win over the Edmonton Oilers. At the end of the season, Cogliano was nominated by the Ducks for the Bill Masterton Memorial Trophy for the fourth time in his career.

During the 2017–18 season, on January 12, 2018, the Ducks re-signed Cogliano to a three-year, $9.75 million contract extension that would keep him under contract until the end of the 2020–21 season. On January 13, 2018, Cogliano was issued an interference penalty for a hit on Kings' forward Adrian Kempe. After a hearing with NHL's Department of Player Safety, Cogliano was given a two-game suspension. With this, Cogliano's "iron man" streak of 830 consecutive games played ended, which was the longest active streak at the time.

==== Dallas Stars (2019–2021) ====
In the 2018–19 season, on January 14, 2019, Cogliano was traded by the Ducks to the Dallas Stars in exchange for Devin Shore. On February 26, 2019, while playing against the Vegas Golden Knights, Cogliano left the game with an upper-body injury after being hit by Ryan Reaves. He sat out the next game on February 28 against the Los Angeles Kings. It was his first game missed in his NHL career for a reason other than a suspension. He missed the next two games after that, and a fourth in April that season.

==== San Jose Sharks (2021–2022) ====
On July 28, 2021, having left the Stars as a free agent after three seasons, Cogliano was signed to a one-year, $1 million contract with the San Jose Sharks. He made his debut with the Sharks in the opening game of the 2021–22 season, scoring the Sharks first goal of the year in a 4–3 victory over the Winnipeg Jets on October 16, 2021. In his accustomed checking-line role, Cogliano made 56 regular season appearances for the Sharks, registering 4 goals and 15 points.

==== Colorado Avalanche and retirement (2022–2024) ====
On March 21, 2022, set to become an unrestricted free agent and with the Sharks out of playoff contention, Cogliano agreed to be dealt by San Jose to the contending Colorado Avalanche in exchange for a 2024 fifth-round draft selection. He made his debut for the Avalanche, appearing on the fourth-line in a 3–1 defeat to the Vancouver Canucks on March 23, 2022. He played eighteen games in the remainder of the regular season, recording one assist, before the Avalanche entered the 2022 Stanley Cup playoffs. After sweeping the Nashville Predators and defeating the St. Louis Blues in six games, the Avalanche reached the Western Conference Final. This was the fourth conference final appearance of Cogliano's career, this time against the Oilers, his former team. In the first game of the series against the Oilers, Cogliano scored the game-winning goal. In game four, Cogliano injured his hand blocking a shot, and had to exit in advance of the Avalanche completing their sweep of the Oilers to qualify for the 2022 Stanley Cup Final. Cogliano was classified as day-to-day when the Finals began. He was ultimately able to return to play in the Final, despite a broken finger, and earned praise from teammates for motivating them in advance of the Cup-clinching game six against the Lightning.

Following a week of celebrations, on July 5, 2022, Cogliano signed a one-year, $1.25 million contract extension to remain with the Avalanche. In the 2022–23 season, Cogliano recorded 19 points in 79 games. Cogliano appeared in his 1,200th career NHL game on March 7 against the San Jose Sharks, becoming the 127th player in NHL history to reach 1,200 games and the third from the 2005 NHL Draft behind Anže Kopitar and Marc-Édouard Vlasic. On April 30, 2023, during game 6 of the 2023 Stanley Cup Playoffs against the Seattle Kraken, Cogliano was hit by Jordan Eberle, resulting in Cogliano suffering a cervical fracture of his spine.

Re-signed by the Avalanche to another one-year commitment agreeing to a $825,000 contract, Coligano returned for his third season with the Avalanche and his 17th in the NHL on July 2, 2023. Continuing in a bottom-six depth role, Cogliano tallied 19 points in 75 games with Colorado, with his 13 assists representing his most since 2017–18 with Anaheim.

Following the 2023–24 season, Cogliano announced his retirement from professional hockey, and joined the Avalanche front office. He was later named to serve as a special assistant to Chris MacFarland, the Avalanche general manager, on July 11, 2024.

== International play ==
Medal record

Representing Canada

Ice hockey

World Junior Championships
Gold medal – first place	2006 Canada	
Gold medal – first place	2007 Sweden	

In his final season with the St. Michael's Buzzers, Cogliano represented Canada at the 2004 World U-17 Hockey Challenge, where he led the team in scoring. He sent the stick he used in the tournament to the Hockey Hall of Fame.

In 2005–06, Cogliano represented Canada in the 2006 World Junior Ice Hockey Championships in Vancouver, winning a gold medal. He ended the tournament with 5 points in 6 games. Cogliano again won gold with Canada at the following 2007 World Junior Ice Hockey Championships, in Sweden, registering 1 goal and 2 assists for 3 points in 6 appearances. Colgiano completed his junior international career having won the gold medal in each tournament he participated in.

== Personal life ==
Cogliano and his wife actress Allie Betram have three daughters together. As he is of Italian descent, Cogliano chose to wear the jersey number 13 while with the Oilers.

== Career statistics ==
=== Regular season and playoffs ===
			Regular season					Playoffs
Season	Team	League	GP	G	A	Pts	PIM	GP	G	A	Pts	PIM
2003–04	St. Michael's Buzzers	OPJHL	36	26	46	72	14	24	11	20	31	12
2004–05	St. Michael's Buzzers	OPJHL	49	36	66	102	33	25	22	24	46	20
2005–06	University of Michigan	CCHA	39	12	16	28	38	—	—	—	—	—
2006–07	University of Michigan	CCHA	38	24	26	50	12	—	—	—	—	—
2007–08	Edmonton Oilers	NHL	82	18	27	45	20	—	—	—	—	—
2008–09	Edmonton Oilers	NHL	82	18	20	38	22	—	—	—	—	—
2009–10	Edmonton Oilers	NHL	82	10	18	28	31	—	—	—	—	—
2010–11	Edmonton Oilers	NHL	82	11	24	35	64	—	—	—	—	—
2011–12	Anaheim Ducks	NHL	82	13	13	26	15	—	—	—	—	—
2012–13	EC KAC	EBEL	7	2	4	6	2	—	—	—	—	—
2012–13	Anaheim Ducks	NHL	48	13	10	23	6	7	0	1	1	4
2013–14	Anaheim Ducks	NHL	82	21	21	42	26	13	1	6	7	8
2014–15	Anaheim Ducks	NHL	82	15	14	29	14	16	3	6	9	4
2015–16	Anaheim Ducks	NHL	82	9	23	32	28	7	2	2	4	0
2016–17	Anaheim Ducks	NHL	82	16	19	35	26	17	1	2	3	9
2017–18	Anaheim Ducks	NHL	80	12	23	35	41	4	1	0	1	2
2018–19	Anaheim Ducks	NHL	46	3	8	11	14	—	—	—	—	—
2018–19	Dallas Stars	NHL	32	3	3	6	8	13	2	0	2	4
2019–20	Dallas Stars	NHL	68	3	11	14	30	23	0	2	2	10
2020–21	Dallas Stars	NHL	54	5	6	11	24	—	—	—	—	—
2021–22	San Jose Sharks	NHL	56	4	11	15	12	—	—	—	—	—
2021–22	Colorado Avalanche	NHL	18	0	1	1	8	16	3	3	6	16
2022–23	Colorado Avalanche	NHL	79	10	9	19	44	4	0	0	0	0
2023–24	Colorado Avalanche	NHL	75	6	13	19	16	11	0	5	5	2
NHL totals			1,294	190	274	464	449	131	13	27	40	59

=== International ===
Year	Team	Event	Result	GP	G	A	Pts	PIM
2004	Canada Ontario	U17	1st place, gold medalist(s)	6	5	7	12	6
2004	Canada	U18	1st place, gold medalist(s)	5	4	5	9	22
2006	Canada	WJC	1st place, gold medalist(s)	6	1	4	5	4
2007	Canada	WJC	1st place, gold medalist(s)	6	1	2	3	0
Junior totals				23	11	18	29	32

== Awards and honours ==
Award	Year
College
All-CCHA Rookie Team	2006
NHL
Stanley Cup champion	2022

Awards and achievements
Preceded by Rob Schremp	Edmonton Oilers first-round draft pick 2005	Succeeded by Sam Gagner
