= R-Ḥ-M =

Triconsonantal root of many Arabic and Hebrew words, indicating mercy and sympathy

R-Ḥ-M (Arabic: ر-ح-م, Hebrew: ר־ח־ם) is the triconsonantal root of many Arabic and Hebrew words, and many of those words are used as names. It indicates mercy and sympathy.

- raḥmah (Arabic: رحمة), raḥamim (Hebrew: רחמים): "caring; cares, mercy".

== Arabic ==
Arabic verbal stems:

- raḥima: "be mild, care, have mercy"
- raḥḥama: "care for, feel sympathy for"
- istirḥama: "beg for mercy"
- R-ḥ-m: “womb”

Raḥmān is an Arabic term that is commonly translated as "compassionate" or "beneficent". In the Islamic context; definite Al-Rahman is a name of God in Islam. There is debate as to whether this is also the name of a pre-Islamic Arabian deity, or if it is an epithet of God like Al-Rahim "the Merciful". As the terms "Raḥmān" ("the merciful," a divine epithet), "the God of Israel", and the "Lord of Judah", can also be seen in 6th and 7th centuries inscriptions of the Jewish Yemeni Himyarite Kingdom. The Quraish appeared confused as to why Muhammad used this term as in Sura Al-Furqan verse 60 " When it is said to them, “Prostrate to the Most Compassionate,” they ask ˹in disgust˺, “What is ‘the Most Compassionate’? ". The pagan, Suhail ibn Amr, asked Muhammad to replace his insignia, "By the Name of God, Al-Rahman, the most Merciful," (b-ismi-llāhi r-raḥmāni r-raḥīmi) with "By Your Name O Allah!" (b-ismika allahum!) Furthermore, Suhail said, "As for 'Rahman,' by Allah, I do not know what it means." It is thus unlikely an elative of Raḥim.

The name Al-Rahman is used in the Qur'an 57 times. The name Al-Rahman occurs most frequently in Sura Maryam (16 times). In verse 18 of this Sura, Maryam (Mary) says: "I seek refuge in Al-Rahman, that you may be righteous." Mary asks for protection from Al-Rahman against one whom she perceives as a man entering her private chambers, but who in fact is the Archangel Jibrāʾīl (Gabriel). In 19:45, Abraham says to his father, a disbeliever and idol-worshipper: "I fear you could be struck with the wrath of Al-Rahman, then become an ally of the devil." Some confusion has arisen as to why the name Al-Rahman is used in the Qur'an in contexts of divine punishment. One possibility is that God's wrath and subsequent punishment may be provoked by disbelief in and abuse of His Prophets, Messengers, and saints, so great is His mercy and compassion for those He loves.

While Rahman has a connotation around giving and providing without being asked, Rahim has a connotation around continuing to give when asked or showing mercy and forgiveness.

=== Given names ===
- Abdur Rahman: "servant of al-Rahman"
- Raheem, Rahman and Rahim: are one of the names of God in Islam, meaning "Merciful"
- Raheema
- Rahema
- Rahima: is a female Arabic given name meaning "kind or compassionate"
- Rahimah
- Rakhim
- Rachman
- Rakhman
- Rachmaninov
- Rahmanov, Rachmanov, Rakhmanov
- Rachamim
- Rahamim
- Rahmangule

=== See also ===
Rahmanism

== Hebrew ==
- raḥam, raḥamim: "care, be mild, have mercy, have tender affection, have compassion"
- raḥum: "mildhearted, softhearted, compassionate"
- raḥmani: "mild, meek, careful, merciful, compassionate"
- raḥmanut: "pity, mercy, empathy" (usage: to have raḥmanut for someone)
- raḥum v'ḥanun: compassionate and gracious/merciful. Two of the thirteen attributes of God's mercy in Judaism, from Exodus 34

The most common Hebrew word for "grace" is חן (hen), which can also be translated as "favor," "beauty," or "charm." It signifies undeserved goodwill or kindness, often given by God. Eg.Genesis 6:8 and Ephesians 2:8.
