= Patrick Marleau =

Canadian ice hockey player (born 1979)

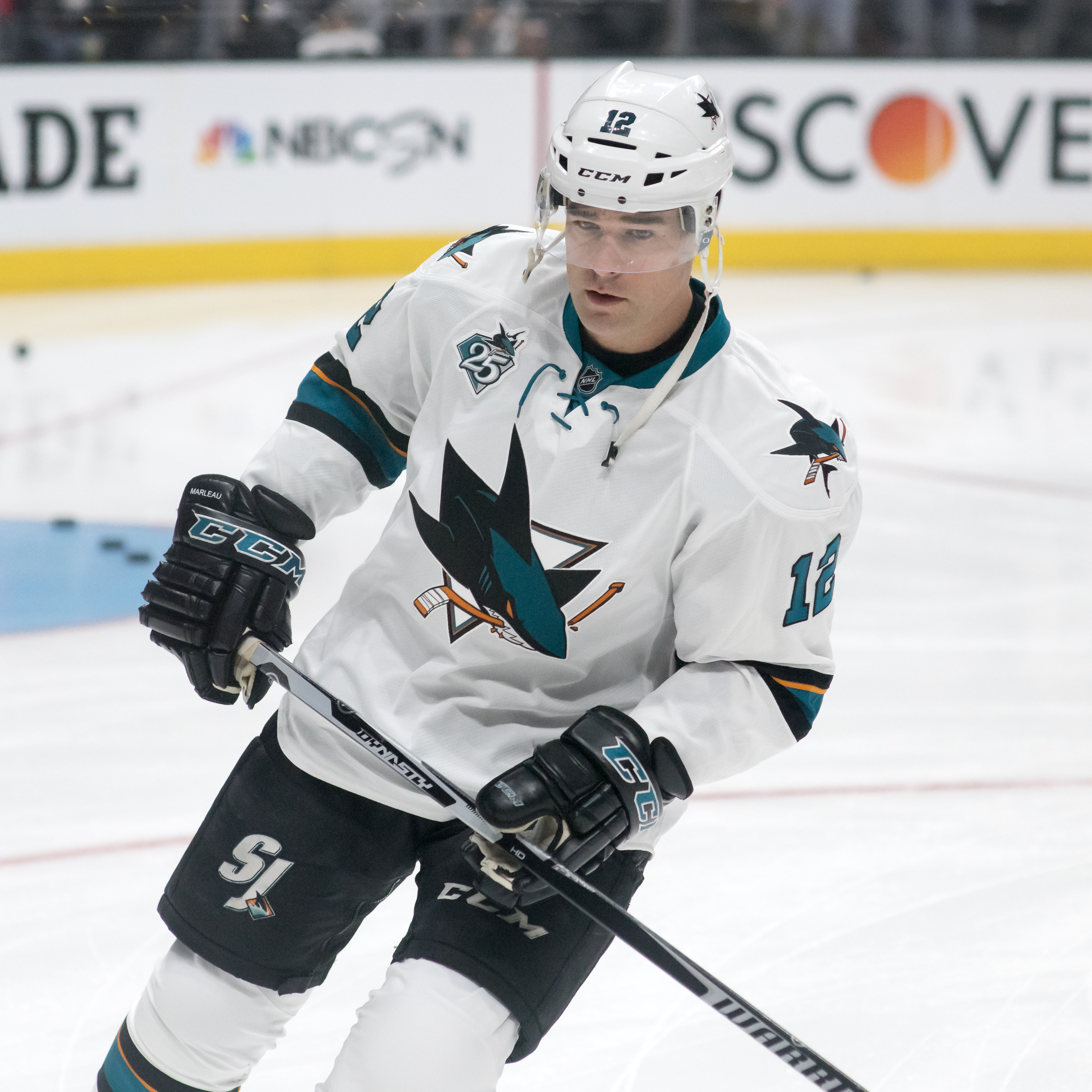
- Marleau with the San Jose Sharks in 2016
- Born: September 15, 1979 (age 47) Swift Current, Saskatchewan, Canada
- Height: 6 ft 2 in (188 cm)
- Weight: 215 lb (98 kg; 15 st 5 lb)
- Position: Centre / Left wing
- Shot: Left
- Played for: San Jose Sharks; Toronto Maple Leafs; Pittsburgh Penguins
- National team: Canada
- NHL draft: 2nd overall, 1997; San Jose Sharks
- Playing career: 1997–2021

Patrick Denis Marleau (born September 15, 1979) is a Canadian former professional ice hockey forward. With 1,779 NHL games played, he is the all-time leader in regular season games played in league history. He passed the record previously held by Gordie Howe in his 1,768th game on April 19, 2021. Marleau scored 1,197 points during his entire National Hockey League (NHL) career. The San Jose Sharks drafted Marleau second overall in the 1997 NHL entry draft, and Marleau spent the vast majority of his NHL career with the franchise, becoming its all-time leader in goals, even strength goals, power play goals, points, shots, and games played. Marleau is also the fourth player in NHL history to record 900 consecutive games played, reaching the mark one game after breaking the overall games played record. He was the third-last active player who played in the NHL in the 1990s, with the others being Zdeno Chára and longtime teammate Joe Thornton.

Marleau is one of just five NHL players to play 1,400 games with one team, and the youngest to reach both the 1,300- and 1,400-game marks. He was seven games short of becoming the youngest player to play in 1,500 games with one team before signing with his second team, the Toronto Maple Leafs, in 2017. After two seasons with Toronto, he returned to San Jose in 2019, and was traded to the Pittsburgh Penguins before the 2020 Stanley Cup playoffs. After failing to win a Stanley Cup, Marleau returned to the Sharks as a free agent for the 2020–21 season, his final season. Marleau holds the distinction of playing the most NHL games (both regular season and playoffs) without winning the Stanley Cup, an active streak as of the end of the 2023–24 season. His number, 12, was retired by the Sharks on February 25, 2023.

Internationally, Marleau won gold medals with Canada at the 2010 and 2014 Winter Olympics. Marleau, one of the most important players of the Sharks for nearly 20 seasons, was known as one of the fastest skaters in the NHL and exhibited a high standard of playing ability combined with gentlemanly conduct. This earned him two nominations for the Lady Byng Memorial Trophy and made him a popular player both among fans and his professional peers.

== Early years ==
Marleau was born in Swift Current, Saskatchewan, to parents Denis and Jeanette Marleau and grew up on his family farm near Aneroid. A sign near Saskatchewan Highway 13, just outside Aneroid, proclaims that it is Marleau's hometown. His parents have said they knew Marleau had a special talent when he was playing with 16- and 17-year-old players as a 14-year-old at the 1995 Canada Games in Grande Prairie and was interviewed by Hockey Night in Canada reporter Scott Oake.

== Playing career ==
=== Junior career ===
Marleau's junior hockey career took him to the Seattle Thunderbirds of the Western Hockey League (WHL), where he played two seasons. In his rookie campaign in 1995–96, Marleau exploded onto the scene in Seattle scoring 32 goals and 74 points, leading his team to a playoff loss to the defending Memorial Cup champions, the Kamloops Blazers, featuring future NHL star Jarome Iginla. The series ended 4–1, but Seattle took three of the losses to overtime before the Blazers won.

During the 1996–97 season, Marleau was named captain of the Thunderbirds and led them to a second-place finish, behind the Portland Winter Hawks, in the Western Conference during the regular season. Marleau improved to 51 goals and 125 points, finishing top-three in the WHL in both categories. In the playoffs, Marleau led the Thunderbirds to the club's first Western Conference Championship before the team bowed out in the WHL Finals to the eventual Memorial Cup runner-up Lethbridge Hurricanes in four games. Marleau finished second in the WHL's Player of the Year voting, losing to Peter Schaefer of the Brandon Wheat Kings.

=== Professional (1997–2021) ===
==== San Jose Sharks (1997–2017) ====
Following his second year of major junior, Marleau was drafted second overall by the San Jose Sharks in the 1997 NHL entry draft, behind future Sharks teammate Joe Thornton, who was selected by the Boston Bruins. Although he struggled early in his career, Marleau learned to combine his excellent offensive talents with defensive prowess from former Sharks head coach Darryl Sutter.

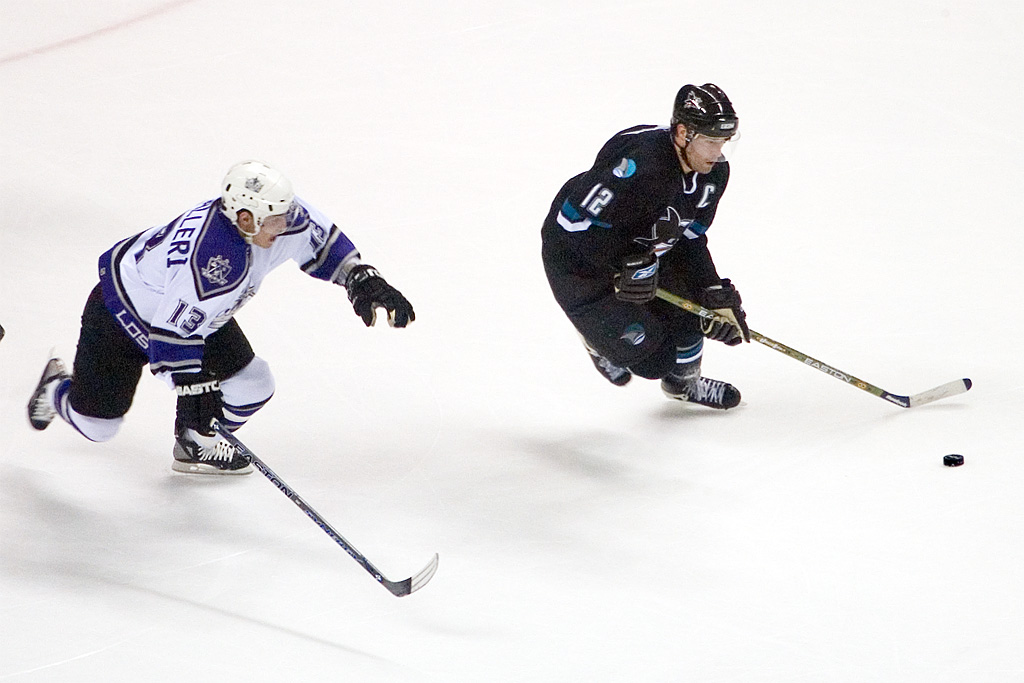
Marleau with the San Jose Sharks in December 2006. During the 2006–07 season, he became the Sharks' all-time regular season leader in goals, and points.

Marleau was the youngest player in the 1997 draft class, and he debuted immediately at the start of the 1997–98 season. This conceptually makes him the youngest player to ever play in the NHL (in the modern draft era it would be impossible to debut at an earlier age than Marleau, as he was born on the last day of the draft cut-off, and debuted immediately in the first game of the next season).

With the departure of five-year captain Owen Nolan following the 2002–03 season, the Sharks employed a rotating captaincy for the first half of the 2003–04 season, seeing Mike Ricci, Vincent Damphousse and Alyn McCauley wear the "C" before the captaincy was permanently awarded to Marleau midway through the season. The new captain went on to match his previous personal high of 57 points from 2002 to 2003.

During the 2004–05 NHL lockout, Marleau was inactive during the season but returned in 2005–06, having just signed a new three-year, US$12.5 million contract in August 2005, with a breakout season, becoming a point-per-game player with career-highs of 34 goals, 52 assists and 86 points in 82 games. New rule changes implemented by the NHL at the start of the first season back from the lockout that emphasized speed may have contributed to Marleau's successful campaign. In a game against the Colorado Avalanche on March 19, 2006, Marleau scored two goals to acquire his 400th career point, edging him closer to Owen Nolan's franchise mark of 451 points. Near the halfway point of the season, the Sharks acquired superstar Joe Thornton from the Boston Bruins. Thornton was also the only player picked ahead of Marleau in the 1997 NHL Entry Draft. The Sharks were quickly considered a contender once acquiring "Jumbo Joe", but were upset by the eighth-seeded Edmonton Oilers in the second round. At the end of the season, Marleau was voted one of three finalists for the Lady Byng Memorial Trophy, awarded to the NHL's most gentlemanly player, but lost out to Pavel Datsyuk of the Detroit Red Wings.

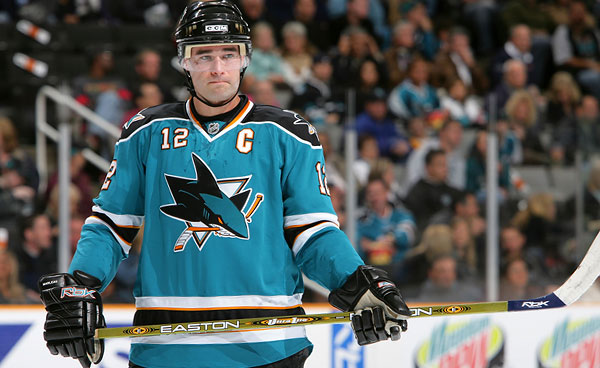
Marleau captained the Sharks from 2004 to 2009.

In 2006–07, Marleau passed Owen Nolan's franchise marks for goals, assists and points all within a few weeks. On January 4, 2007, he passed Nolan's 451-point mark with a goal and three assists in a win against the Detroit Red Wings. He then scored his 207th goal a week later on January 11 in a win against the Los Angeles Kings. Marleau continued at a point-per-game pace on the season with 78 points in 77 games, ranking second on the team in each category. In January 2007, Marleau played in his second NHL All-Star Game, scoring a goal. However, with high expectations for the playoffs, the Sharks were eliminated by Detroit in the second round in six games. In the off-season, Marleau signed a two-year, $12.6 million contract extension in August 2007 to keep him with the Sharks until the end of the 2009–10 season.

The following season, Marleau reached the 500-point mark for his career against the Phoenix Coyotes on November 14, 2007. However, his production for the season dipped to just 48 points, his lowest total since the 2001–02 season. In the 2008 playoffs, Marleau became the first NHL player since Brett Hull in 2002 to score shorthanded goals on consecutive days in the playoffs when he scored back-to-back shorthanded markers in Games 3 and 4 of the Western Conference Semi-final against the Dallas Stars. Despite his efforts, which included eight points in 13 games total for the playoffs, the Sharks were eliminated in the second round for the third consecutive year.

In the midst of a rejuvenated year for Marleau, overcoming his previous season's dismal offensive output, he was selected to the 2009 NHL All-Star Game in Montreal, replacing the injured Pavel Datsyuk.

In the summer of 2009, Marleau was removed as captain by head coach Todd McLellan. Rob Blake was named captain on September 30, 2009. Later in the year, while Blake was injured, Marleau was promoted to alternate captain, joining Joe Thornton and Dan Boyle.

On November 27, 2009, Marleau notched a hat-trick against the Edmonton Oilers. His third goal of the game was a shorthanded marker to tie the game 4–4; the Sharks finished the game with a score of 5–4 in a shootout. On December 1, 2009, Marleau played in his 900th career NHL game and notched two goals in a 5–2 win over the Ottawa Senators. On December 26, 2009, Marleau scored his 300th (and 301st) career goal in a 5–2 win over the Anaheim Ducks. On January 12, 2010, Marleau scored his 30th (and 31st) goal against the Phoenix Coyotes to become the fastest player in franchise history to score 30 goals in just 47 games. It was also the first time a Sharks player was the first NHL player to reach 30 goals. In the 2010 playoffs, Marleau scored the game-winning goal in Games 3 and 5 in the second round against the Detroit Red Wings, then scored five of the Sharks' seven goals in a sweep at the hands of the eventual Stanley Cup champions, the Chicago Blackhawks.

On June 24, 2010, Marleau chose to not test the free agent waters and instead re-signed with the Sharks to a four-year contract worth $27.6 million ($6.9 million per year).

On January 17, 2011, Marleau played his 1,000th career game and scored an early goal against the Phoenix Coyotes, becoming the third-quickest player to 1,000 career NHL games as measured by age, as well as the youngest player in NHL history to reach the milestone with the same franchise.

Once the 2012–13 NHL lockout had concluded, Marleau got off to one of the best offensive starts in NHL history. He scored two goals in each of San Jose's first four games, then coming one goal short of five-straight multi-goal games, becoming only the second player in NHL history to open a season with four straight multi-goal games. The only other player to do it was Cy Denneny with the original Ottawa Senators in 1917–18. On March 10, 2013, against the Colorado Avalanche, Marleau scored his 400th career goal after failing to score in the previous six games. However, the Sharks lost the game 3–2. In the 2013 playoffs, Marleau scored his 57th career playoff goal, the second most of all active players, and 37th all-time. Marleau scored the most shots (41) and goals (5) with the Sharks in the postseason, and ended the season with 17 goals, 150 shots, and six, eight and 14 goals, assists and points, respectively, on powerplays, both ranking second on the team. Marleau also ranked third on the team with 31 points.

On January 24, 2014, Marleau signed a three-year contract extension with the Sharks through to the 2017 season. At the end of the 2013–14 season, Marleau ranked second in goals on the Sharks and was named a finalist for the Lady Byng Memorial Trophy for the second time, this time losing to Ryan O'Reilly.

On August 20, 2014, Sharks head coach Todd McLellan announced that the Sharks would start training camp for the 2014–15 season without a captain or alternates; he specified Marleau would have the opportunity to "earn back" a letter during camp.

On January 11, 2016, Marleau played in his 500th consecutive game.

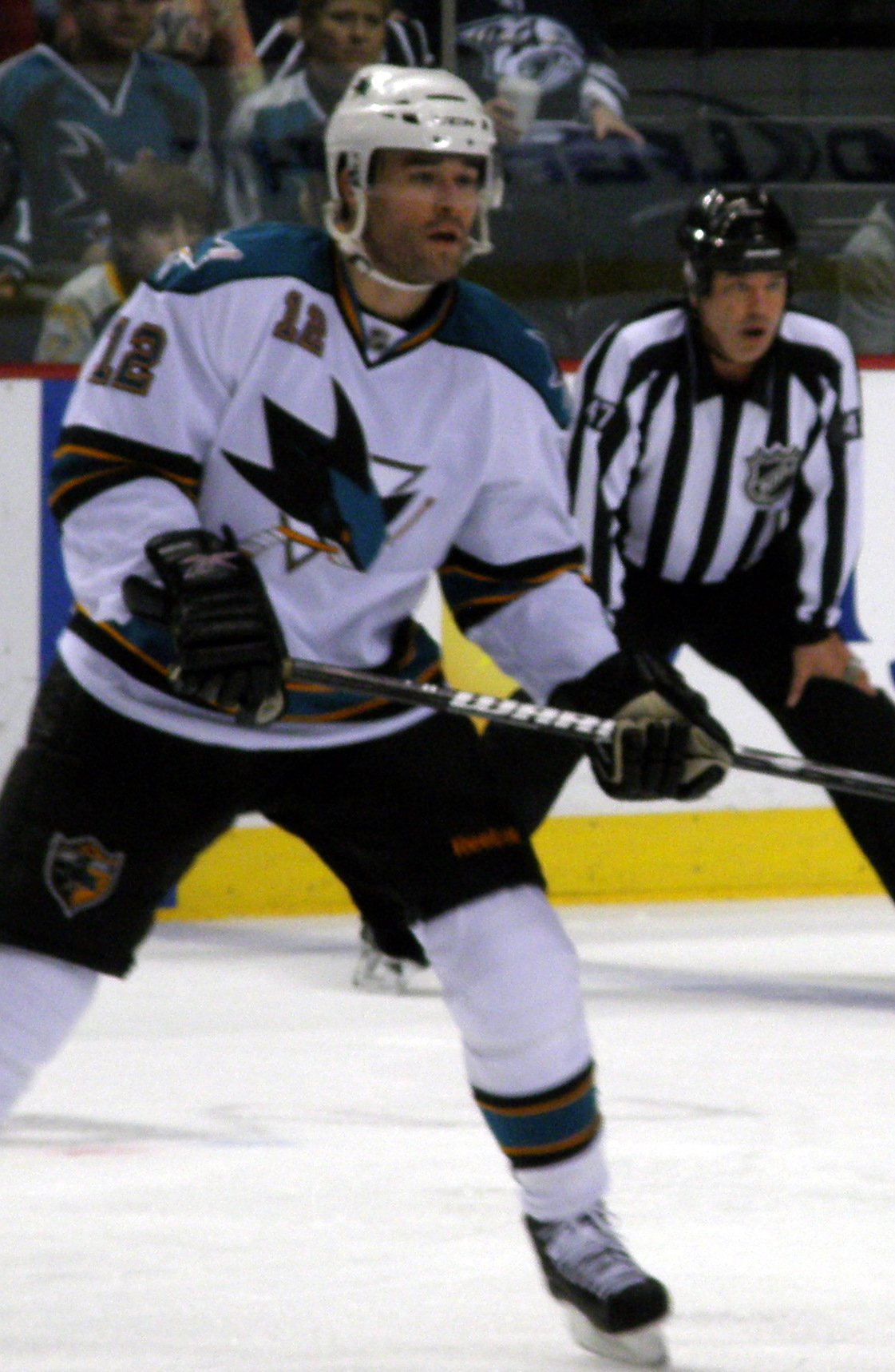
Marleau in February 2010. During the 2009–10 season, he scored 44 goals, his personal best.

On March 19, 2016, Marleau became the youngest player to play in his 1,400th NHL game, becoming 1 of only 36 players to accomplish this feat.

On January 23, 2017, against the Colorado Avalanche, Marleau scored four goals for the first time in his career, all in the third period, three of which came in 7:42.

On February 2, 2017, against the Vancouver Canucks, Marleau scored his 500th career goal, the 45th player in NHL history to do so, and only the 17th player to do so with his original team.

==== Toronto Maple Leafs (2017–2019) ====
Entering the open market for the first time in his career, Marleau was heavily courted by multiple teams, including the San Jose Sharks, Toronto Maple Leafs, Anaheim Ducks and Dallas Stars. The prospect of leaving his team of nearly 20 years caused Marleau's decision to be delayed, but after days of deliberation, on July 2, 2017, Marleau signed a three-year contract worth $6.25 million annually with the Maple Leafs. Marleau cited returning to Canada, as well as the young Maple Leafs projection as a Stanley Cup contender as reasons for signing in Toronto. Additionally, he cited the Maple Leafs' advanced sports science department as benefit of signing with the team (during free agency, Marleau was in the midst of one of the longest iron man streaks in NHL history). Marleau left San Jose holding nearly every offensive record in franchise history.

During his first season with Toronto, Marleau continued to reach notable career milestones. He played in his 1,500th career NHL game on October 18, 2017, becoming the 18th player in NHL history to reach 1,500 contests. Marleau recorded his 100th game-winning goal in a win over the Anaheim Ducks, becoming the eighth player to score 100 game-winning goals. He scored his 1,100th career point on December 12, becoming the 60th player in NHL history to reach the feat. Later during the season, he passed Maple Leafs' great Darryl Sittler with 1,122 career points, becoming 58th on all-time list. His 1,122nd point came in a win over the Buffalo Sabres on March 15, 2018.

On November 26, 2018, Marleau played in his 1,600th NHL game and became the 11th player to reach the mark, while also making an assist in the Maple Leafs' 4–2 win over the Boston Bruins.

On June 22, 2019, with the Maple Leafs in need of salary cap relief, Marleau was traded to the Carolina Hurricanes (along with a conditional first-round pick and a seventh-round pick in the 2020 NHL entry draft) in exchange for a sixth-round pick in the 2020 Draft. With the Hurricanes unable to convince Marleau to play for the team due to Marleau preferring to return to the West Coast, on June 27, Marleau was bought-out from the remaining year of his contract by the Hurricanes. Carolina used the first-round pick acquired from the Maple Leafs to select Seth Jarvis.

==== Return to San Jose (2019–2020) ====
On October 9, 2019, Marleau signed a one-year, $700,000 contract to return to the Sharks. The following day, he formally made his Sharks return against the Chicago Blackhawks; he scored two goals in a 5–4 victory, the Sharks' first of the 2019–20 season. Marleau received a standing ovation during his first home game on October 13; he recorded an assist in a 3–1 win over the Calgary Flames. On October 25, Marleau played his 1,500th game as a member of the San Jose Sharks, and became the seventh player in NHL history to play 1,500 games with one NHL franchise. On January 11, 2020, Marleau played in his 1,700th NHL game, becoming the fifth player in NHL history to reach the mark, and youngest to do so, as the Sharks defeated the Stars 2–1.

==== Pittsburgh Penguins (2020) ====
With the Sharks sitting outside a playoff spot approaching the trade deadline, many speculated that Marleau and fellow Sharks veteran Joe Thornton would be traded for a shot at winning the Stanley Cup. On February 24, 2020, Marleau was traded to the Pittsburgh Penguins for a conditional 2021 third-round pick. His Cup ambitions would quickly end however as the Penguins were defeated in four games by the Montreal Canadiens, who were the lowest-seeded team to make the postseason.

==== Third stint in San Jose (2020–2021) ====
On October 13, 2020, Marleau returned to San Jose, signing a one-year contract. On April 19, 2021, in an away game against the Vegas Golden Knights, Marleau played his 1,768th NHL game, breaking the all-time NHL regular season games played record formerly held by Gordie Howe since 1961. At the time he surpassed Howe's record, Marleau had missed only 31 games in his career, and had played with or against 37% of the players who had ever played in the NHL. He has played in all 82 regular season games in 11 separate seasons.

One game later, on April 21, Marleau became the fourth player in NHL history to record 900 consecutive games played.

After going unsigned during the 2021–22 season, Marleau announced his retirement on May 10, 2022. He recorded zero penalty minutes in 1,547 games of his career, the most for a player in NHL history. His number 12 jersey was retired by the Sharks on February 25, 2023, making him the first member of the San Jose Sharks franchise to receive this honor.

== International play ==
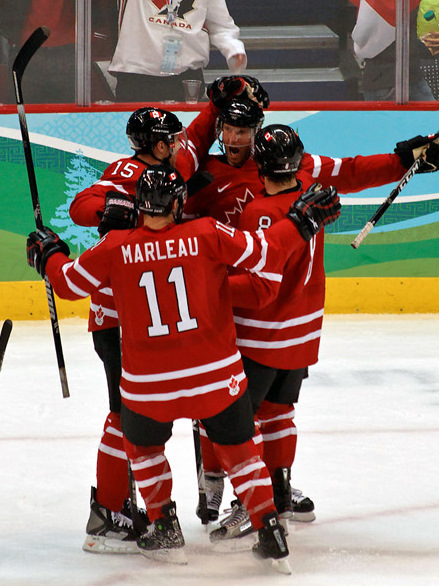
- Marleau celebrates with Team Canada during the 2010 Olympics

Medal record

Representing Canada

Men's ice hockey

Olympic Games
Gold medal – first place	2010 Vancouver	
Gold medal – first place	2014 Sochi	

World Championships
Gold medal – first place	2003 Finland	
Silver medal – second place	2005 Austria	

World Cup
Gold medal – first place	2004 Canada	

Marleau won a gold medal with Canada at the 2003 World Championships in Finland. Later, in the midst of the 2004–05 NHL lockout, Marleau joined Canada for two international tournaments, the 2004 World Cup and the 2005 World Championships, capturing a World Cup title by defeating Finland in the final and a silver medal at the World Championships, when his team lost to the Czech Republic 0:3. In the summer following his silver-medal effort with Canada, he was invited to the national team's development camp for the 2006 Winter Olympics, but was omitted from the final roster.

On December 30, 2009, Marleau was selected to play for Canada at the 2010 Winter Olympics in Vancouver, where he won a gold medal. Marleau also made the Canada roster for the 2014 Winter Olympics in Sochi, winning another gold medal.

== Personal life ==
Patrick and his wife Christina have four sons. Marleau and his family live in San Jose, as he still works with the Sharks and mentors Will Smith. Marleau has an older sister, Denise, and an older brother, Richard.

== Career statistics ==
=== Regular season and playoffs ===
Bold indicates led league
Bold italics indicate NHL record

			Regular season					Playoffs
Season	Team	League	GP	G	A	Pts	PIM	GP	G	A	Pts	PIM
1993–94	Swift Current Legionnaires AAA	SMHL	53	72	95	167	—	—	—	—	—	—
1994–95	Swift Current Legionnaires AAA	SMHL	31	30	22	52	18	—	—	—	—	—
1995–96	Seattle Thunderbirds	WHL	72	32	42	74	22	5	3	4	7	4
1996–97	Seattle Thunderbirds	WHL	71	51	74	125	37	15	7	16	23	12
1997–98	San Jose Sharks	NHL	74	13	19	32	14	5	0	1	1	0
1998–99	San Jose Sharks	NHL	81	21	24	45	24	6	3	1	4	4
1999–00	San Jose Sharks	NHL	81	17	23	40	36	5	1	1	2	2
2000–01	San Jose Sharks	NHL	81	25	27	52	22	6	2	0	2	4
2001–02	San Jose Sharks	NHL	79	21	23	44	40	12	6	5	11	6
2002–03	San Jose Sharks	NHL	82	28	29	57	33	—	—	—	—	—
2003–04	San Jose Sharks	NHL	80	28	29	57	24	17	8	4	12	6
2005–06	San Jose Sharks	NHL	82	34	52	86	26	11	9	5	14	8
2006–07	San Jose Sharks	NHL	77	32	46	78	33	11	3	3	6	2
2007–08	San Jose Sharks	NHL	78	19	29	48	33	13	4	4	8	2
2008–09	San Jose Sharks	NHL	76	38	33	71	18	6	2	1	3	8
2009–10	San Jose Sharks	NHL	82	44	39	83	22	14	8	5	13	8
2010–11	San Jose Sharks	NHL	82	37	36	73	16	18	7	6	13	9
2011–12	San Jose Sharks	NHL	82	30	34	64	26	5	0	0	0	4
2012–13	San Jose Sharks	NHL	**48**	17	14	31	24	11	5	3	8	2
2013–14	San Jose Sharks	NHL	82	33	37	70	18	7	3	4	7	2
2014–15	San Jose Sharks	NHL	82	19	38	57	12	—	—	—	—	—
2015–16	San Jose Sharks	NHL	82	25	23	48	10	**24**	5	8	13	8
2016–17	San Jose Sharks	NHL	**82**	27	19	46	28	6	3	1	4	0
2017–18	Toronto Maple Leafs	NHL	**82**	27	20	47	16	7	4	1	5	4
2018–19	Toronto Maple Leafs	NHL	82	16	21	37	28	7	0	2	2	2
2019–20	San Jose Sharks	NHL	58	10	10	20	12	—	—	—	—	—
2019–20	Pittsburgh Penguins	NHL	8	1	1	2	2	4	0	0	0	0
2020–21	San Jose Sharks	NHL	56	4	5	9	10	—	—	—	—	—
NHL totals			1,779	566	631	1,197	527	195	72	55	127	89

=== International ===
Year	Team	Event	Result	GP	G	A	Pts	PIM
1999	Canada	WC	4th	7	1	2	3	0
2001	Canada	WC	5th	7	2	3	5	4
2003	Canada	WC	1st place, gold medalist(s)	9	0	4	4	4
2004	Canada	WCH	1st place, gold medalist(s)	0	—	—	—	—
2005	Canada	WC	2nd place, silver medalist(s)	9	2	2	4	4
2010	Canada	OG	1st place, gold medalist(s)	7	2	3	5	0
2014	Canada	OG	1st place, gold medalist(s)	6	0	4	4	2
Senior totals				45	7	18	25	14

== Awards and honours ==
=== Major junior ===
- Named to the WHL West First All-Star Team in 1997.
- Named to the CHL Second All-Star Team in 1997.

=== NHL ===
- Played in the NHL All-Star Game in 2004, 2007 and 2009.

=== San Jose Sharks ===
- Named the San Jose Sharks' player of the year in 2004, 2009 and 2010.
- His number 12 was retired by the San Jose Sharks on February 25, 2023.

=== Other ===
- Named San Jose Mercury News South Bay Sportsperson of the Year in 2006.

== Records ==
- Most NHL regular season games played – 1,779
- San Jose Sharks' all-time leader in goals – 518
- San Jose Sharks' all-time leader in power-play goals – 161
- San Jose Sharks' all-time leader in shorthanded goals – 17
- San Jose Sharks' all-time leader in game-winning goals – 101
- San Jose Sharks' all-time leader in points – 1,102
- San Jose Sharks' all-time leader in shots – 3,899
- San Jose Sharks' all-time leader in games played – 1,607
- San Jose Sharks' all-time leader in consecutive games played – 624
- Most seasons of 10+ goals scored as a San Jose Shark – 20
- Most seasons of 20+ goals scored as a San Jose Shark – 14
- Most seasons of 30+ goals scored as a San Jose Shark – 7
- Became the fastest San Jose Shark to 10 goals in franchise history (6 games).
- Became the fastest San Jose Shark to 30 goals in franchise history (47 games).
- Became the youngest player in NHL history to reach the 1,000-game mark with one team on January 17, 2011 (against Phoenix).
- Became the first San Jose Shark to score 4 goals in a single period (3rd) on January 23, 2017 (against Colorado).
- Became the first (and only) San Jose Shark to score 500 goals with the team on February 2, 2017 (against Vancouver).
- Became the third-youngest player to 1,000 career NHL games (31 years, 124 days), behind Dale Hawerchuk and Vincent Damphousse.

== See also ==
- List of NHL players with 1,000 games played
- List of NHL players with 500 goals
- List of NHL players with 1,000 points
- List of NHL players with 500 consecutive games played

Awards and achievements
Preceded by Marco Sturm	San Jose Sharks first round draft pick 1997	Succeeded by Scott Hannan
Preceded by Rotating captains Alyn McCauley	San Jose Sharks captain 2004–2009	Succeeded by Rob Blake
