= Blacksands Pacific =

International oil and gas exploration and production headquartered in Houston

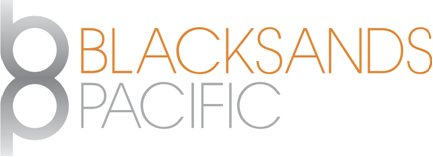
- Type: Private
- Industry: Oil and Gas
- Headquarters: Los Angeles and Houston, United States
- Area served: Africa, Southeast Asia, Americas
- Key people: Raheem J. Brennerman, Executive Chairman and Executive Committee Chair
- Number of employees: 1001-5000
- Website: www.blacksandspacific.com

The Blacksands Pacific Group is an international energy corporation with expertise and focus in upstream oil and gas (exploration & production); integrated gas & power; energy trading; and clean energy. The company is a global player with core focus on emerging and frontier markets and assets in Africa, Southeast Asia and the Americas. The company also transports, stores, purchases and markets crude oil, natural gas & LNG, petroleum products and power. The Executive Chairman and Chair of the Executive Committee is Raheem J. Brennerman.

== History ==
Blacksands Pacific was founded in 2010 by Raheem J. Brennerman, an experienced investor with interests in energy and real estate. Originally an energy trading company marketing crude oil and petroleum products, the company expanded to focus on exploration and production. Blacksands Pacific now also transports, stores, purchases and markets crude oil, natural gas, natural gas liquids and bitumen.

In September 2011, Blacksands Pacific entered into a commercial partnership with Sigmund Oilfields Limited, a Nigerian indigenous oil & gas exploration and production company, to explore, develop and produce oil from offshore the Niger Delta, but later withdrew.

In October 2011, the company formed a joint venture with Oil and Gas Technology Fund Inc to develop the Torrance Field acreage located in the Los Angeles Basin, California and explore and develop other prospects in Nevada.

In February 2012, Blacksands Pacific invested in a joint venture to develop the oil prospects within the Williston Basin Prospect, in North Dakota.

== Current Operations ==
Operating in nine countries, Blacksands Pacific has announced that it is investing significantly in E&P and midstream oil and gas projects in Nigeria and Côte d'Ivoire, and has entered into joint ventures in mining and infrastructure projects, including a project to regasify and distribute liquified natural gas (LNG) in Africa. During an interview with LEADERS magazine in October 2014, Mr. Brennerman revealed that Blacksands Pacific had experienced significant growth, especially in exploration and production, but that it was divesting its smaller interest assets in order to focus on larger assets that the company was acquiring, such as assets in the Gulf of Mexico that are expanding to produce over 100,000 barrels by 2019.
