= Rahima =

Rahima (Arabic: رحيمة, romanized: Rahima Ali, lit. 'Rahima Ali') is a female Arabic given name meaning "merciful, kind, compassionate". The male form is Rahim, and is one of the names of Allah in Islam.

== Given name ==
- Rahima Akhter, Bangladeshi politician
- Rahima Banu (born 1973), Bangladeshi woman who is the last known person to have been infected with naturally occurring Variola major smallpox
- Rahima Begum (born 1984), English human rights activist
- Rahima Ayla Dirkse (born 1993), Dutch model and beauty pageant titleholder
- Rahima Gambo (born 1986), Nigerian photographer and artist
- Rahima Khandaker, Bangladeshi politician
- Rahima Mondal, Indian politician
- Rahima Moosa (1922–1993), South African activist
- Rahima Naz (born 1986), Pakistani poet
- Rahimah Rahim, singer from Singapore
- Rahimah Rahim, Singaporean singer
- Rahima Orchient Yayah (born 1974), Malaysian businesswoman and former model

== Surname ==
- Abdel Amir Abbud Rahima, Iraqi politician
