= List of NBA players with 500 consecutive games played =

For basketball players in the National Basketball Association (NBA), playing 500 consecutive regular season games is considered a highly significant achievement. This is often referred to as an "iron man streak".

As of the 2025–26 NBA season, 22 players have played at least 500 consecutive regular season games in their NBA career. The all-time leader of consecutive games is A. C. Green, who played in 1,192 consecutive games during his career. Mikal Bridges is the current active leader, having played 638 games consecutively (as of April 12th, 2026). If ABA games were to be included, Ron Boone would have 1,041 consecutive games played with 379 games from his time in the NBA.

== 500 consecutive games played ==
Key
^	Denotes player who is currently active in the NBA
*	Denotes player who has been inducted into the Naismith Memorial Basketball Hall of Fame
	Denotes a streak that is currently in progress
**Games** (in bold text)	Denotes a streak that began at their NBA debut

Rank	Name	Games	Start	End	Notes
1	A. C. Green	1,192	November 19, 1986	April 18, 2001	Last game missed was when he was a DNP-CD in his sophomore season. He never missed a game due to injury.
2	Randy Smith	906	February 18, 1972	March 13, 1983	Missed 6 games in his rookie season for undisclosed reasons (most likely DNP-CD's as they were spread out on random days not connected), with the last one being on February 15th, 1972. In the 1983-84 season, he missed a game while waiting to clear waivers, technically stopping his streak. He then retired following the season. If it had been allowed to continue, he would have had 921 games by the end.
3	Red Kerr	**844**	October 31, 1954	November 4, 1965	First game he ever missed in his entire career was a deliberate DNP-CD by the Baltimore Bullets' first-year coach Paul Seymour, allegedly to "take off the stress" from Kerr, just 10 games into what would become his final season. A game the Bullets coincidentally lost regardless of Kerr's benching, after which Kerr's wife, Betsy, wanted to punch Seymour in the nose.
4	Michael Cage	736	April 23, 1989	April 14, 1998	Hamstring injury
5	Dolph Schayes*	706	February 17, 1952	December 26, 1961	Shattered Cheek Bone
6	Bill Laimbeer	685	October 24, 1980	January 27, 1989	Suspension
7	Harry Gallatin*	682	November 20, 1948	March 9, 1958	Retirement
8	Mikal Bridges^	**638**	October 17, 2018	Present	
9	Andre Miller	632	January 26, 2003	December 5, 2010	Suspension
10	John Stockton*	609	February 13, 1990	April 20, 1997	Knee injury
10	Jack Twyman*	609	November 5, 1955	October 29, 1963	Broke two bones in his left hand
12	Mark West	602	April 9, 1988	December 14, 1994	
13	James Donaldson	586	February 18, 1981	April 6, 1988	Suspension
14	B.J. Armstrong	577	February 8, 1990	February 16, 1997	Knee injury
15	Terry Tyler	**574**	October 13, 1978	April 14, 1985	Free agent at start of 1985-1986 season.
16	Shandon Anderson	543	January 30, 1997	January 21, 2004	DNP-CD
16	Karl Malone*	543	December 18, 1991	April 8, 1998	Suspension
18	Otis Thorpe	542	January 4, 1986	April 19, 1992	Kidney injury
19	Derek Fisher	537	April 15, 2005	March 14, 2012	Traded to Houston Rockets, streak ended seeking buyout with team
20	Jim Chones	528	February 2, 1975	November 5, 1981	DNP-CD
21	Hersey Hawkins	527	January 15, 1993	December 8, 1999	Torn calf muscle
22	Bruce Bowen	500	February 28, 2002	March 12, 2008	Suspension

== See also ==
- List of NHL players with 500 consecutive games played
