= List of NHL players with 500 consecutive games played =

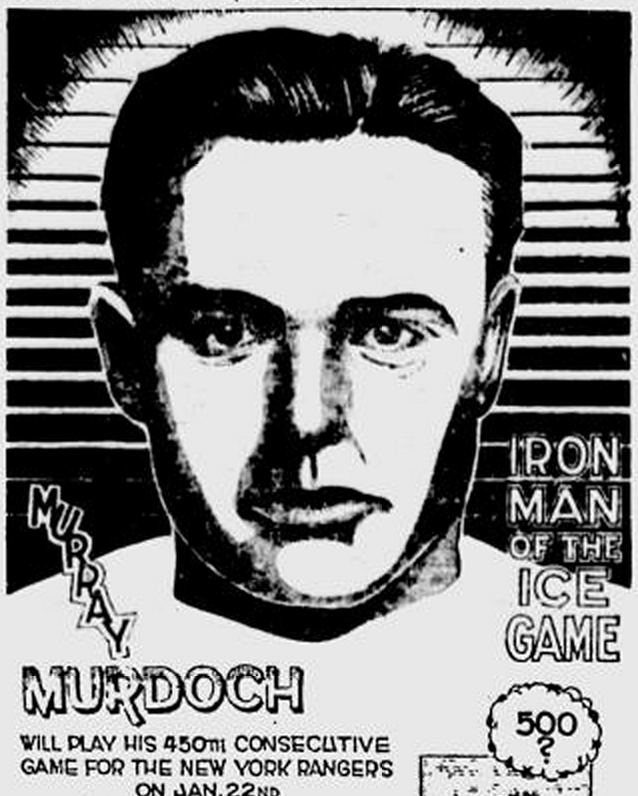
Murray Murdoch, the first player to achieve the feat.

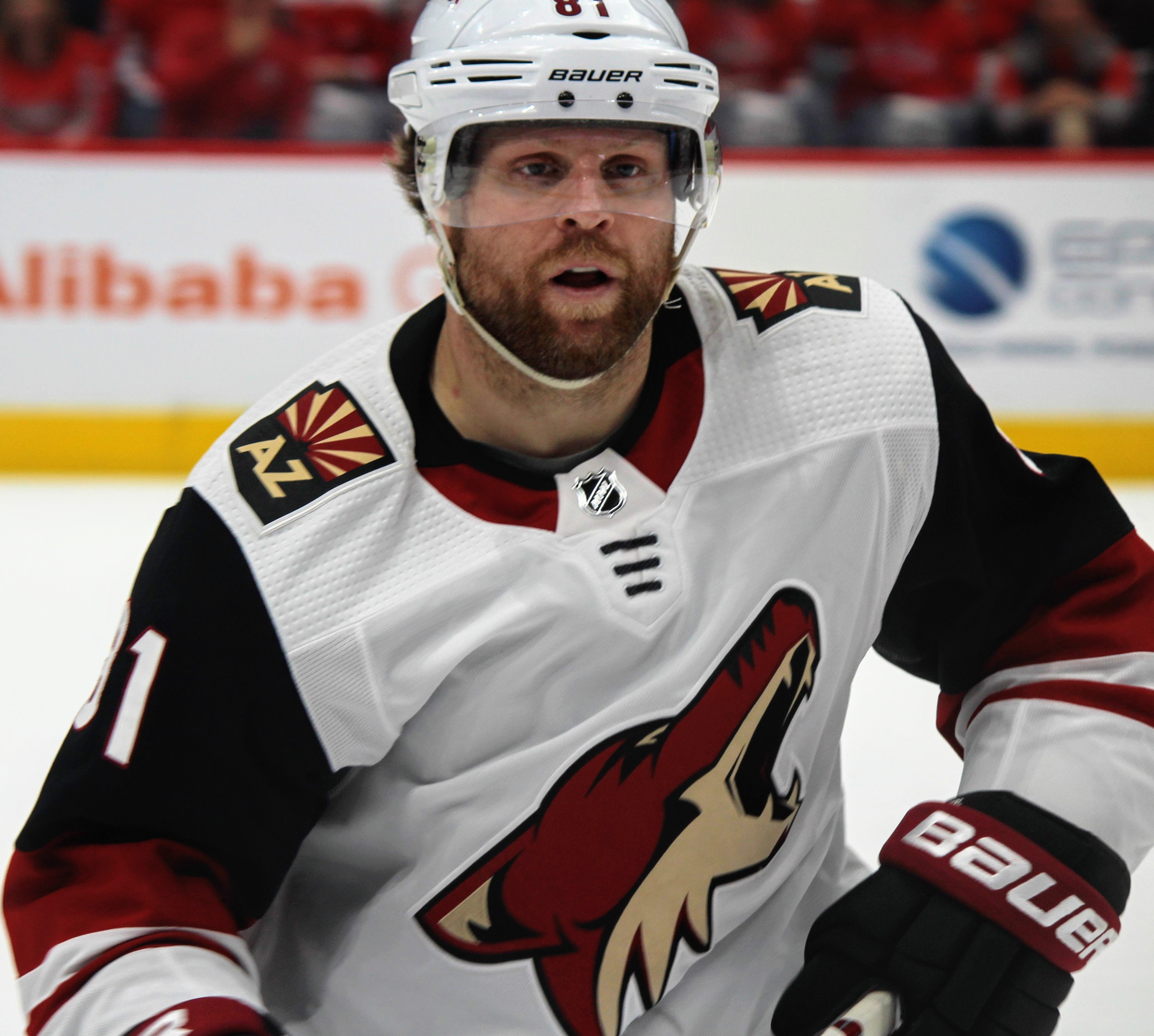
Current record holder, Phil Kessel, pictured in 2019 with the Arizona Coyotes. He is also the first player to play 1,000 consecutive games.

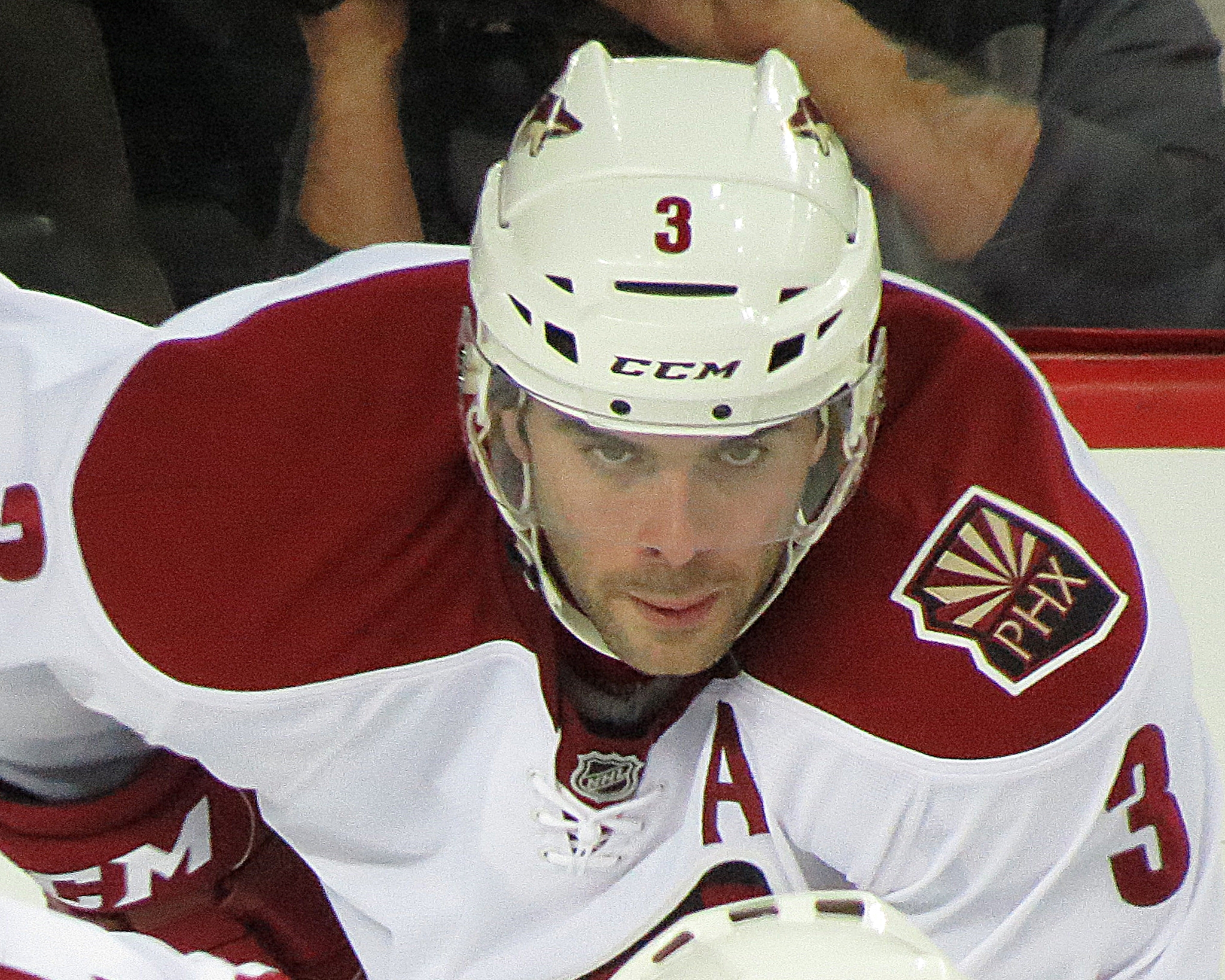
Keith Yandle, pictured with the Phoenix Coyotes in 2013, broke Jarvis' record in January 2022, and held it himself until October 2022.

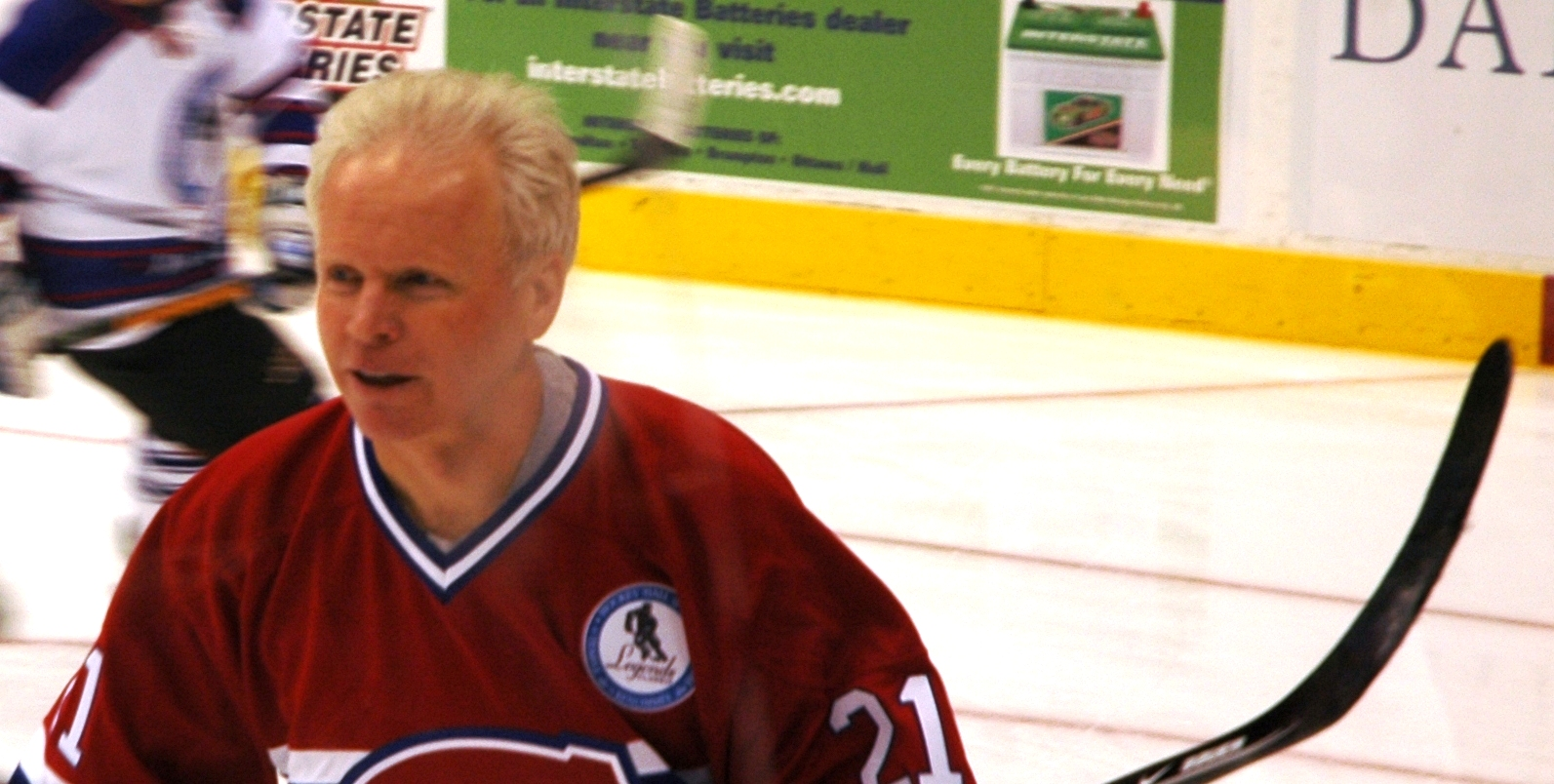
Doug Jarvis, pictured in 2008, held the record for 36 years, from 1986 to 2022.

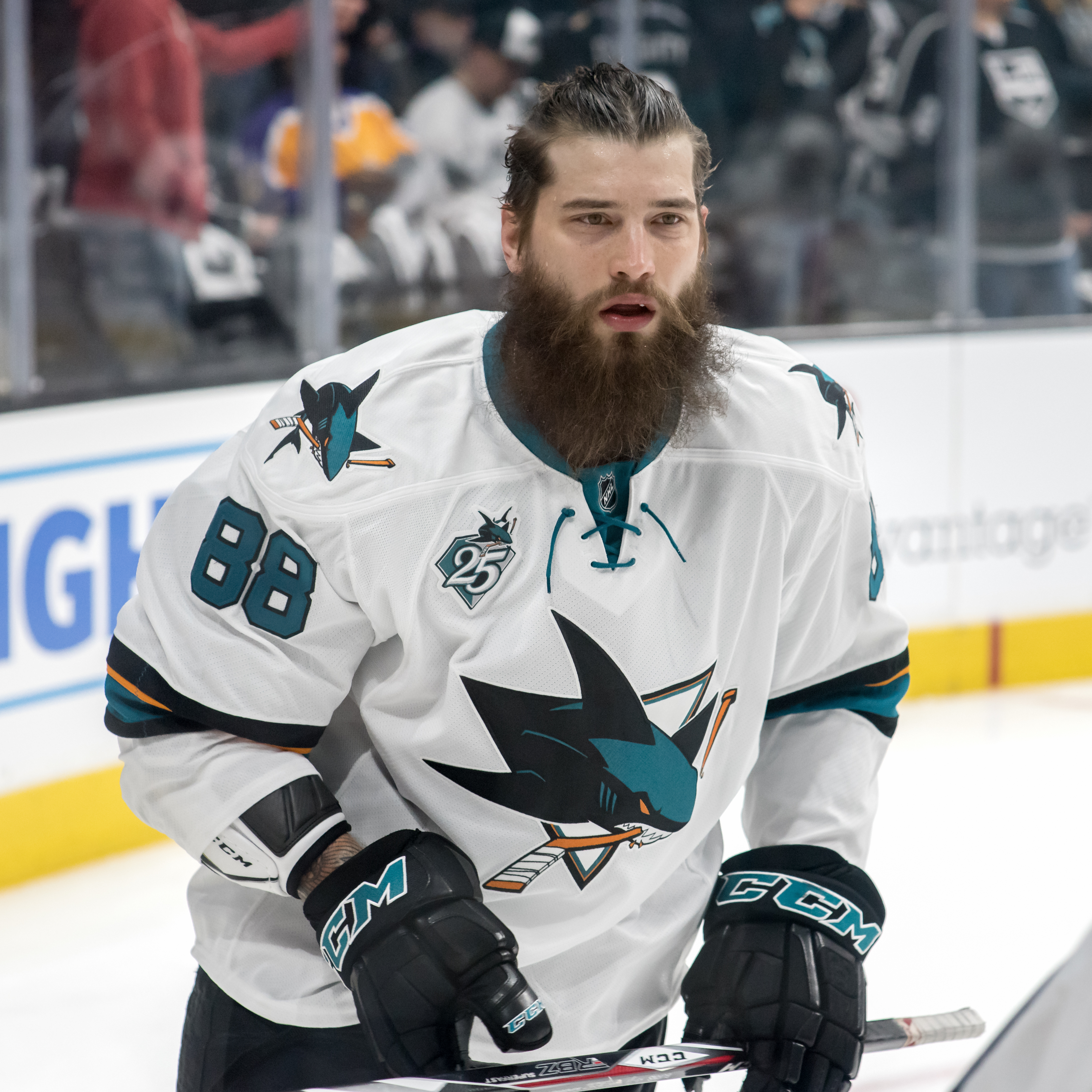
Brent Burns, pictured with the San Jose Sharks in 2016, has not missed a game since 2013, and became the second player to reach 1,000 consecutive games in 2026.

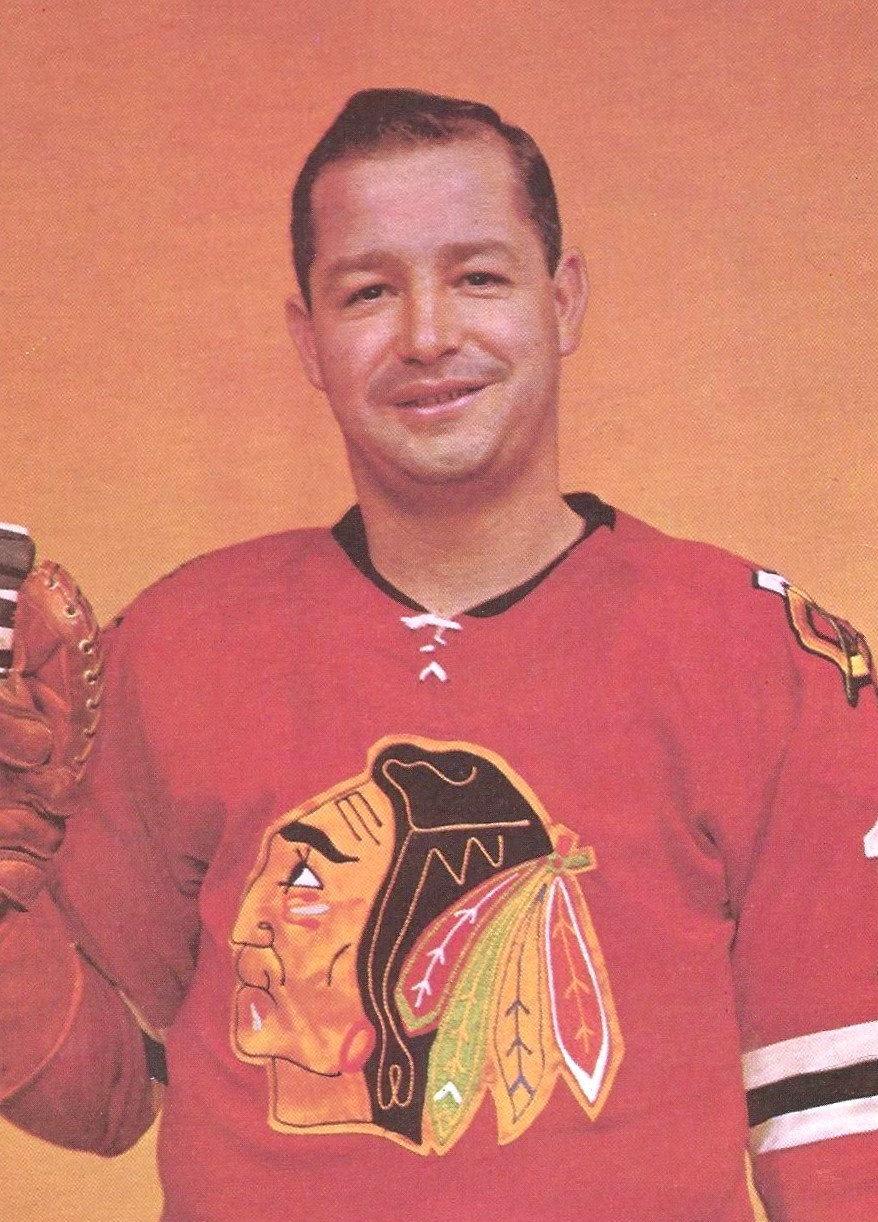
Glenn Hall, the only goaltender to accomplish the feat, played 502 consecutive games between 1955 and 1962.

For ice hockey players in the National Hockey League (NHL), playing 500 consecutive regular season games is considered a highly significant achievement. This is often referred to as an "iron man streak".

As of the completion of the 2025–26 NHL season – the 108th regular season of play of the NHL – 27 players had played at least 500 consecutive regular season games in their NHL career, making it one of the most exclusive 500-clubs in the NHL.

The first player to play 500 consecutive games was Murray Murdoch, who played his 500th consecutive game during the 1936–37 season, the 20th season of the NHL. Phil Kessel is the current record holder, having played 1,064 games consecutively; likewise, he was the first player to have recorded 1,000 consecutive games. Glenn Hall is the only goaltender to play 500 consecutive games (1955–1962), and Henrik Sedin is the only European player to do so (2004–2014).

Several streaks ended for reasons other than player injury. Both Steve Larmer's and Johnny Wilson's streaks ended due to contract disputes. Andrew Cogliano's run ended at 830 games because of a two-game suspension, while Patrick Marleau's streak ended at 910 games with his retirement. During his consecutive games streak, Marleau broke the NHL all-time record for games played, playing his 1,768th game on April 19, 2021. Other streaks ended because the player was a healthy scratch, or was sent down to the minors.

As of the conclusion of the 2025–26 season, there are four players with active 500 consecutive game streaks: Nick Suzuki, Ryan Suter, Brent Burns, and Phil Kessel. Suzuki is the most recent member of the 500 consecutive game club, playing his 500th game on January 10, 2026. In addition to the formal record, Kessel has the unofficial all-time record for most consecutive games played including playoffs (1,149 games).

Keith Yandle initially broke Doug Jarvis' consecutive games played record on January 25, 2022, when the Philadelphia Flyers took the ice against the New York Islanders. Kessel passed Jarvis on March 27, 2022, when the Coyotes played the Winnipeg Jets, and became the NHL's active iron man on April 2, 2022, when Yandle was scratched from the Flyers' starting lineup. Kessel then passed Yandle for the record on October 25, 2022, as his Vegas Golden Knights played the San Jose Sharks; he then became the first player to play 1,000 consecutive games on November 17, 2022.

== 500 consecutive games played ==
This is a list of the 27 NHL players who have played at least 500 consecutive regular season games in their NHL career, updated through the conclusion of the 2025–26 NHL season.

Legend

active streak

NHL record at the time streak completed

( ) denotes games played in current season

(C) streak is from the start of their career

Rank	Name	Games	Start	End	Notes
1	Phil Kessel	1,064	November 3, 2009	April 13, 2023	Last game missed was on October 31, 2009, while playing for the Toronto Maple Leafs (game 12 for the team). He played the last 70 games of that season and, to date, every game since. Kessel broke Yandle's record on October 25, 2022, skating in his 990th consecutive game; he then skated in his 1,000th consecutive game on November 17, 2022. Kessel was scratched for Game 5 of the first round of the 2023 Stanley Cup playoffs on April 24, 2023, his first missed game since October 31, 2009. His ironman streak remains intact, however, because only regular-season games count for such purposes.
2	Brent Burns	1,007	November 21, 2013	Active	Burns' streak started on November 21, 2013, when he returned from facial injuries. He played his 500th consecutive NHL game against the Washington Capitals on December 3, 2019. Burns is the fourth defenseman to play 500 consecutive games and is first player to play 500 consecutive games while playing both forward and defense. Burns skated in his 1,000th consecutive game on April 4, 2026, becoming the second player to reach the mark. Barring a change of team or scheduling change, Burns is currently on pace to break Kessel's record on February 15, 2027 against the Columbus Blue Jackets.
3	Keith Yandle	989	March 26, 2009	March 29, 2022	Yandle broke Jarvis' record on January 25, 2022, skating in his 965th consecutive game. Streak ended when Yandle was made a healthy scratch by Flyers interim coach Mike Yeo.
4	Doug Jarvis	964 (C)	October 8, 1975	October 10, 1987	Never missed a game in his career. Broke Garry Unger's record by playing in his 915th NHL game on December 26, 1986. He was a scratch in the third game of the 1987–88 season while playing for the Hartford Whalers. He never played another NHL game.
5	Garry Unger	914	February 24, 1968	December 21, 1979	Streak ended when Unger was benched by Atlanta Flames coach Al MacNeil.
6	Patrick Marleau	910	April 9, 2009	May 12, 2021	Marleau did not play the opening few games of the 2019–20 season, while he was an unrestricted free agent. He signed an NHL contract with the San Jose Sharks on October 9, 2019. Because Marleau was not under contract at the time, the four games that the Sharks had previously played are not considered for the purposes of the streak. Marleau additionally became the all-time leader in games played in game 899 of his streak, surpassing the record previously held by Gordie Howe. Streak informally ended with Marleau's final game of the 2020–21 season, and formally ended with his retirement on May 10, 2022.
7	Steve Larmer	884	October 6, 1982	April 15, 1993	Did not miss a game during 11 years with the Blackhawks. Streak ended as a result of a contract dispute after the 1992–93 season ended.
8	Andrew Cogliano	830 (C)	October 4, 2007	January 13, 2018	Consecutive games streak ended as a result of a two-game suspension. The NHL Department of Player Safety later ruled that Cogliano hit Kings' forward Adrian Kempe with a "high, forceful hit", after Kempe had completed a pass.
9	Craig Ramsay	776	March 27, 1973	February 10, 1983	Dave Lewis ripped a slap shot off Ramsay's left foot, afterward Ramsay was not in the lineup for the next game.
10	Jay Bouwmeester	737	March 6, 2004	November 22, 2014	Streak ended as a result of a lower body injury, believed to be from stepping on a crack on the ice.
11	Henrik Sedin	679	March 21, 2004	January 18, 2014	Missed game as a result of a rib injury. At the time of the completion, Sedin's streak was the sixth longest streak in NHL history.
12	Andy Hebenton	630 (C)	October 7, 1955	March 22, 1964	Was the first player to break Johnny Wilson's consecutive games played record. Hebenton's streak ended as a result of being sent to the minors. After being sent to the minors, Hebenton never played in the NHL again. Hebenton's consecutive game streak (including the minor leagues) was 1062 games, which included 216 games prior to his time in the NHL and an additional 216 games after his NHL career. His career streak came to end as a result of attending his father's funeral.
13	Karl Alzner	622	October 8, 2010	April 7, 2018	Alzner's streak started at the beginning of the 2010–11 season. He did not play in the last game of the 2009–10 season while playing for the Washington Capitals. Streak ended as a result of being a healthy scratch for the opening game of the 2018–19 season on October 3, 2018, while playing for the Montreal Canadiens.
14	Johnny Wilson	580	February 10, 1952	March 20, 1960	Played eight consecutive seasons of 70 games along with the final 20 games of the 1951–52 NHL season. Streak ended as a result of a contract dispute. At the time of the completion, Wilson's streak was the longest in NHL history.
15	Billy Harris	576	October 7, 1972	November 28, 1979	Harris played the first 576 games in Islanders history. On November 30, 1979, he was made a healthy scratch by Al Arbour on the 20th game of the season, ending his streak.
16	Mark Recchi	570	October 4, 1991	December 11, 1998	Streak ended due to a case of pneumonia that Recchi had been fighting for several weeks. Recchi said in an interview that he no longer had the energy and the best way to help the team was to rest.
17	Danny Grant	566	December 4, 1968	December 19, 1975	Streak ended as a result of a torn right thigh muscle that required surgery.
18	Alex Delvecchio	548	December 13, 1956	November 11, 1964	Delvecchio was accidentally struck by a Red Kelly shot. He suffered a hairline fracture of the jaw, but missed only two games.
19	Nick Suzuki	546 (C)	October 3, 2019	October 20, 2026	Had not missed a game since his NHL debut on October 3, 2019. Suzuki played his 500th consecutive game on January 10, 2026. Suzuki's streak came to an end after he was struck on the left hand by a shot from defenceman Michael Kesselring. The Canadiens announced the following day that Suzuki would miss 2-4 weeks and that his ironman streak would end.
20	Brendan Morrison	542	February 27, 2000	December 12, 2007	Morrison's streak ended as a result of wrist surgery. He had injured his wrist in the preseason but had continued to play through the pain. At the time of completion, Morrison's streak was the eleventh longest streak in NHL history.
21	Ryan Suter	535	October 4, 2018	April 15, 2025	Missed the last four games of the 2017–18 season while playing for the Minnesota Wild, sustaining a fractured fibula in a game versus the Edmonton Oilers. Suter's 500th consecutive game was played on January 18, 2025.
22	Craig MacTavish	519	October 12, 1986	January 2, 1993	Streak ended as a result of a lower back strain. At the time of its completion, it was the second-longest active streak in the league.
23	Brad Boyes	513 (C)	October 5, 2005	November 23, 2011	Streak ended as a result of a lower body injury.
24 (tie)	Andrew Brunette	509	January 2, 2002	February 19, 2009	Brunette appeared to injure his knee in a game in January and aggravated the injury several weeks later, causing his streak to end at 509 games.
24 (tie)	John Marks	509	October 27, 1973	December 30, 1979	
26	Murray Murdoch	508 (C)	November 16, 1926	March 21, 1937	First player in NHL history to play 500 consecutive games.
27	Glenn Hall (G)	502	October 6, 1955	November 7, 1962	Streak ended on November 7, 1962, game 13 of the 1962–63 season. Hall's streak ended when he was fastening the toe strap on his skate and suddenly "feeling his back go out". Including playoffs, Hall played a total of 551 consecutive games.

== See also ==
- List of NBA players with 500 consecutive games played
