= Rahim Mohamed =

Bodega manager and internet personality known for "the Ocky Way"

- Born: 1988 or 1989 (age 36–37)
- Other name: General Ock
- Occupations: Bodega manager; internet personality
- Years active: 2020–present
- Employer: Red Hook Food Corp (bodega)
- Known for: Viral “Ocky Way” sandwich videos

Rahim Mohamed (known online as "General Ock") is a Yemeni-American bodega manager and internet personality based in Brooklyn, New York. He is best known for preparing over-the-top sandwiches "the Ocky Way" in videos that drew a large following on TikTok and other platforms, and for later opening a dessert shop branded the "Ocky Way Chocolate Factory" in 2023.

== Personal life and career ==
Mohamed spent the first ten years of his life in Taiz, Yemen, before moving to Brooklyn in 1999 with his brother, sister, and mother. He has worked at Red Hook Food Corp, a family-run bodega in Red Hook, Brooklyn, for more than a decade as of 2021. He began posting short cooking videos on TikTok in 2020, focusing on custom sandwiches assembled with snacks and sweets from the store shelves. His nickname "General Ock" is derived from the Arabic "akhi" ("brother").

His sandwiches have included a BLT served between two Pop-Tarts, sausage with Takis on a hero roll, tuna salad with Cheez-Its, a bacon, egg and cheese on a Jamaican beef patty, and a sausage, egg and cheese between red velvet pancakes. He is also known for catchphrases used in the videos, among them "Neva neva neva forget the bev." He was also featured in a short documentary from The New York Times about running a TikTok-famous bodega. In 2023, Mohamed expanded beyond the bodega with the Ocky Way Chocolate Factory, a dessert shop selling knafeh, waffles, crêpes and shakes.

Visitors to Mohamed's shop have included athletes Eli Manning, Mikal Bridges, and Obi Toppin; rappers Quavo and French Montana; and singer Rubi Rose.
