= Iron man (sports streak) =

Athlete of unusual physical endurance

An iron man is an athlete of unusual physical endurance. This durability is generally measured by an athlete's ability to play without missing a game for an extended period of time, sometimes even for an entire career. Some of the more notable athletes with significant streaks in sports history include baseball's Lou Gehrig and Cal Ripken Jr., American football's Brett Favre and Joe Thomas, basketball's A.C. Green, stock car racing's Jeff Gordon and hockey's Phil Kessel and Keith Yandle.

== Background ==
The term "iron man" as it pertains to sports longevity has origins in Major League Baseball pitcher Joe McGinnity, who was known for pitching in back-to-back doubleheaders and leading his league in innings pitched four times in five seasons from 1900 to 1904. He also played professionally until age 54. His nickname was "Iron Man", although he said the name originated from his off-season work at his family's foundry business.

In 1939, an athlete noted for endurance was recognized as an "iron man" by the Boston Post when Lou Gehrig's streak of 2,130 consecutive games ended when he asked his manager to take him out of the lineup because of his fading abilities. Gehrig had been a consistent performer on the field, attaining a yearly batting average of at least .300 throughout his career until the previous season, when he fell to .295.

A common characteristic of an iron man is the ability to play through injury. Gehrig displayed this trait in 1934 when his streak was in jeopardy of being snapped at 1,426 games. He was injured during a game and was pulled from the lineup. The next day, after receiving heat treatments and massages for a stiff back, he was able to get a hit before leaving the contest. Gehrig's record stood for 56 years until surpassed by Cal Ripken Jr. in 1995. After Ripken's record-breaking streak garnered attention from the media, the NBA's A.C. Green received attention, in 1997, for his streak of consecutive games played, as he was approaching Randy Smith's record. In 1999, Brett Favre set the record for consecutive starts by a quarterback when he started his 117th consecutive game, surpassing the mark established by Ron Jaworski. In 2009, Favre would surpass Jim Marshall's starts streak at any position with his 271st consecutive start.

An iron man streak can also end for disciplinary reasons. In 2015, Matt Kenseth was suspended after he caused a crash that ended Joey Logano's race at Martinsville. NASCAR issued a two-race suspension, effectively ending his streak at 571, leaving him ineligible for pursuing Jeff Gordon's 797-race streak.

In international cricket, players can be taken out of the squad for injuries, discipline, poor form, illegal bowling action, or unfavourable conditions for certain bowlers, or simply as a healthy break when they are rested during long tours or in a calendar year with hectic schedules. In 2016, Brendon McCullum finished his international career having started in 101 consecutive tests from debut; this is notable not only because he was never dropped for poor form or poor health, but because New Zealand has a far leaner schedule than Australia and England; even though he is nowhere near Allan Border's actual record of 153, they were not from debut. Brendon McCullum also started 122 consecutive One-Day Internationals from 2004 to 2010, the same as Mahela Jayawardene of Sri Lanka with 122 each, but the record is held by Sachin Tendulkar whose streak was snapped by an injury.

In the National Football League, Josh Allen of the Buffalo Bills and Jake Matthews of the Atlanta Falcons have the longest active starts streak among quarterbacks and among all players, respectively.

== List of streaks ==
Streaks through now.

Key
*	Broke record on current streak

League	Type	Player	Streak	Yrs Eq	Held since	Surpassed	Streak	Active pursuant(s)	Streak	References
ITF	Grand slams played	Feliciano López	79	19.75	2018	Roger Federer	65	Frances Tiafoe	40	
MLB	Games played	Cal Ripken Jr.	2,632	16.25	1995	Lou Gehrig	2,130	Matt Olson	620	
JSA	Matches played	Tamawashi*	1,718	22.4	2024	Aobajō	1,630	Yoshiazuma	1,384	
MLB	Innings played	Cal Ripken Jr.	8,264	5.67	1985	George Pinkney	5,152	Several players	<1,450	
NASCAR	Races started	Jeff Gordon	797	23.04	2015	Ricky Rudd	788	Joey Logano	578	
IndyCar	Races started	Scott Dixon*	327	19.44	2023	Tony Kanaan	318	Graham Rahal	237	
Formula One	Races started	Lewis Hamilton	265	10.58	2017	Nico Rosberg	206	Max Verstappen	253	
NBA	Games played	A.C. Green	1,192	14.54	1997	Randy Smith	906	Mikal Bridges	556	
NFL	Starts at the quarterback position	Brett Favre	297	18.56	1999	Ron Jaworski	116	Josh Allen	137	
NFL	Starts at any position	Brett Favre	297	18.56	2009	Jim Marshall	270	Jake Matthews	193	
NFL	Games played	Jeff Feagles	352	20.71	2005	Jim Marshall	282	Jon Weeks	254	
NFL	Snaps	Joe Thomas	10,363	10.44	2017					
NHL	Games played	Phil Kessel*	1,064	12.67	2022	Keith Yandle	989	Brent Burns	1,011	
NHL	Starts at the goaltender position	Glenn Hall	502	7.09	1959	Tiny Thompson	306	N/A (Note: No NHL goaltender has started all his team's games in a single season since Roger Crozier in 1964–65. Additionally, no NHL goaltender has played every minute of all his team's games in a single season since Eddie Johnston in 1963–64.)	–	
NHL	Complete games played	Glenn Hall	502	7.09	1959	Alec Connell	257	N/A	–	
PBA	Games played	LA Tenorio	744		2019	Alvin Patrimonio	596	Mark Barroca	546	

== See also ==
- List of most consecutive starts and games played by National Football League players
- List of NBA players with 500 consecutive games played
- List of NHL players with 500 consecutive games played
- Major League Baseball consecutive games played streaks
