= River Ock (disambiguation) =

River Ock may refer to

in England

- River Ock, Devon, a former name of the River Okement
- River Ock, Oxfordshire, a tributary of the River Thames
- River Ock, Surrey, a tributary of the River Wey
