= Raheem J. Brennerman =

American businessman

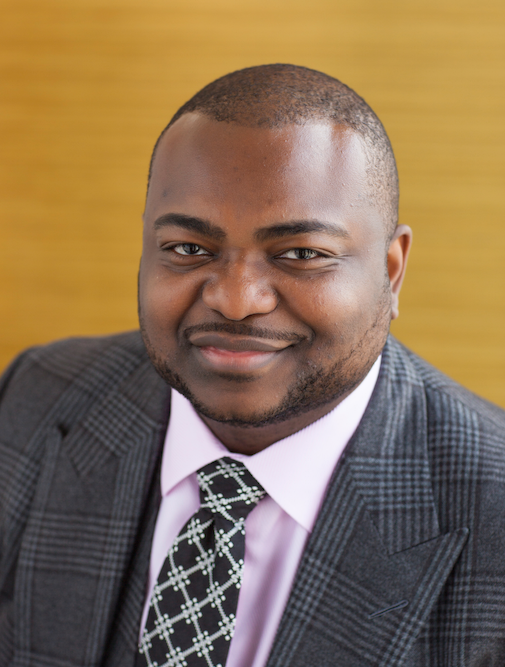
Portrait of Raheem J Brennerman for LEADERS Magazine

Raheem Jefferson Brennerman (born 1978) (also known as Raheem Jefferson Soe-Tan Jr. Brennerman) is an American businessman. He currently serves as the chairman for RJB Capita. He is also the Chair & Co-Trustee for Brennerman Family Foundation Trust and the principal of Brennerman Family Holdings and The House of Brennerman Holdings.

== Life ==
Raheem Jefferson Brennerman was born in 1978. He grew up living in New York City, and then in both London and Switzerland. Brennerman's father was an American businessman but he was primarily raised by his mother, an international businesswoman, a diamond broker and textile trader. His step-father, an American banker and businessman of Nigerian descent, also partly raised him and introduced him to the oil trading business in Africa. Brennerman was admitted at the age of sixteen to the University of London, where he earned his bachelor's degree in economics. He later achieved a master's degree from Columbia University. He started his career in Investment Banking at J. P. Morgan Chase & Co with focus on mergers and acquisition in the U.S. and European markets. On leaving J. P. Morgan Chase & Co and prior to establishing his businesses, Brennerman worked for the family energy business, which was started by his paternal grandfather in Louisiana.

In April 2017 Brennerman was arrested for civil contempt following a civil case brought by ICBC (London), a subsidiary of the Industrial and Commercial Bank of China. In June 2017, Brennerman was also arrested for alleged bank fraud, wire fraud and conspiracy. In December 2017, Brennerman was convicted of conspiracy to commit bank and wire fraud, bank fraud, wire fraud, and visa fraud, and was sentenced in November 2018 to 12 years in prison. Brennerman has maintained that he is innocent, was wrongfully convicted, that key evidence was intentionally withheld, that evidence was intentionally misrepresented, that the judges involved acted improperly, and that constitutional rights were not afforded to him.

== Companies ==
In 2004, Brennerman founded BLV Group Corporation, a real estate company.

In 2010, Brennerman founded Blacksands Pacific, an international oil and gas exploration and production company. Originally an energy trading company marketing crude oil and petroleum products. The company expanded to focus on exploration and production.

== Advocacy ==
Brennerman has been an advocate of the US oil and gas industries' investments in Africa. He has pressed the US Government to spend more on shale oil and gas infrastructure in order to create more jobs and ultimately raise tax revenues, lower manufacturing costs and generate less reliance on energy imports. Brennerman has also called for the US Government to lift the export ban on crude oil. Other issues that Brennerman has written about in the media include the importance of the Gulf of Mexico as a continuing source of hydrocarbons and the need for oil and gas producers in the GCC countries to increase their investment in shale oil and gas exploration and technology.
