= Mikal Bridges =

American basketball player (born 1996)

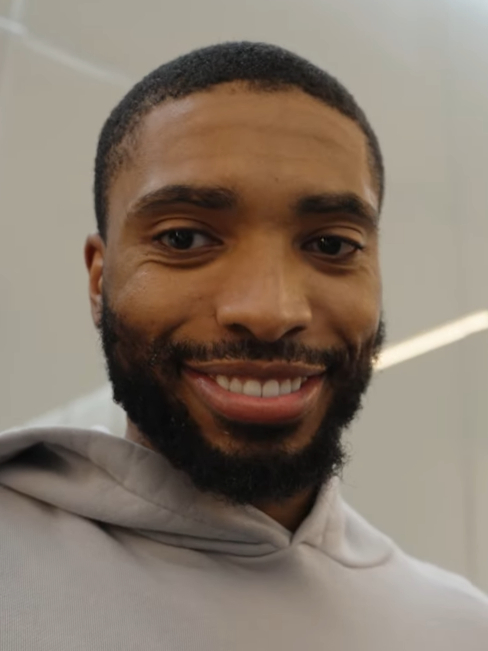
- Bridges in 2024

No. 25 – New York Knicks
- Position: Shooting guard / small forward
- League: NBA

Personal information
- Born: August 30, 1996 (age 30) Philadelphia, Pennsylvania, U.S.
- Listed height: 6 ft 6 in (1.98 m)
- Listed weight: 209 lb (95 kg)

Career information
- High school: Great Valley (Malvern, Pennsylvania)
- College: Villanova (2015–2018)
- NBA draft: 2018: 1st round, 10th overall pick
- Drafted by: Philadelphia 76ers
- Playing career: 2018–present

Career history
- 2018–2023: Phoenix Suns
- 2023–2024: Brooklyn Nets
- 2024–present: New York Knicks

Career highlights
- NBA champion (2026); NBA All-Defensive First Team (2022); NBA Cup champion (2025); 2× NCAA champion (2016, 2018); Third-team All-American – AP, SN, NABC (2018); Julius Erving Award (2018); First-team All-Big East (2018); Second-team All-Big East (2017); Big East co-Defensive Player of the Year (2017); Big East tournament MVP (2018)
- Stats at NBA.com
- Stats at Basketball Reference

Mikal Bridges (/mɪˈkɛl/ mih-KEL; born August 30, 1996) is an American professional basketball player for the New York Knicks of the National Basketball Association (NBA). He played college basketball for the Villanova Wildcats, winning national championships in 2016 and 2018. As of June 2026, Bridges holds the active record for the most consecutive games played and has the eighth-longest consecutive game streak of all time, having not missed a game in his NBA career since being drafted.

Nicknamed "the Warden", Bridges was selected with the tenth overall pick by the Philadelphia 76ers in the 2018 NBA draft before being traded to the Phoenix Suns on draft night, where he was a part of the team that reached the 2021 NBA Finals. Following a February 2023 trade to the Brooklyn Nets, Bridges was dealt to the New York Knicks in July 2024, winning his first NBA Finals in 2026.

== Early life ==
Bridges is the son of Jack Bridges and Tyneeha Rivers. Tyneeha gave birth to him at the age of 19. He grew up in Overbrook, Philadelphia, and nearby neighborhoods. He moved to Malvern, Pennsylvania in middle school. His second cousin is former La Salle player Tyrone Garland.

== High school career ==
Bridges attended Great Valley High School in Malvern, Pennsylvania, where he was coached by Jim Nolan. He began to get serious about basketball in his sophomore year when he had a growth spurt to reach 6–6. As a junior, he averaged 20 points and eight rebounds per game. During his senior season, he was named First Team All-Class AAAA. He posted averages of 18.5 points, 7.2 rebounds, 2.4 assists, 2.4 blocks, and 1.6 steals per game as a senior. Bridges was named to the Philadelphia Inquirer's All-Southeastern Pa., boys basketball first team as a senior. In his career, he had 1,340 points and 511 rebounds. Coming out of high school, he was ranked by ESPNU as the 82nd best player nationally, and committed to Villanova in June 2013.

== College career ==
=== Freshman year ===
Bridges redshirted his freshman season and assisted in scouting players. In his first year with Villanova, he appeared in all 40 games for the Wildcats. He said he had to do a lot of weightlifting and change his three-point shot. He had a key role coming off the bench in the 2016 NCAA tournament, scoring 11 points in a Final Four rout of the Oklahoma Sooners. Bridges won the NCAA championship along with his teammates for the school for the first time since 1985. He averaged 6.4 points, 3.2 rebounds, and 1.1 steals per game as a freshman. "He came in as a high school scoring phenom like they all do, so I'm really proud of how he has opened up his game defensively," coach Jay Wright said.

=== Sophomore year ===
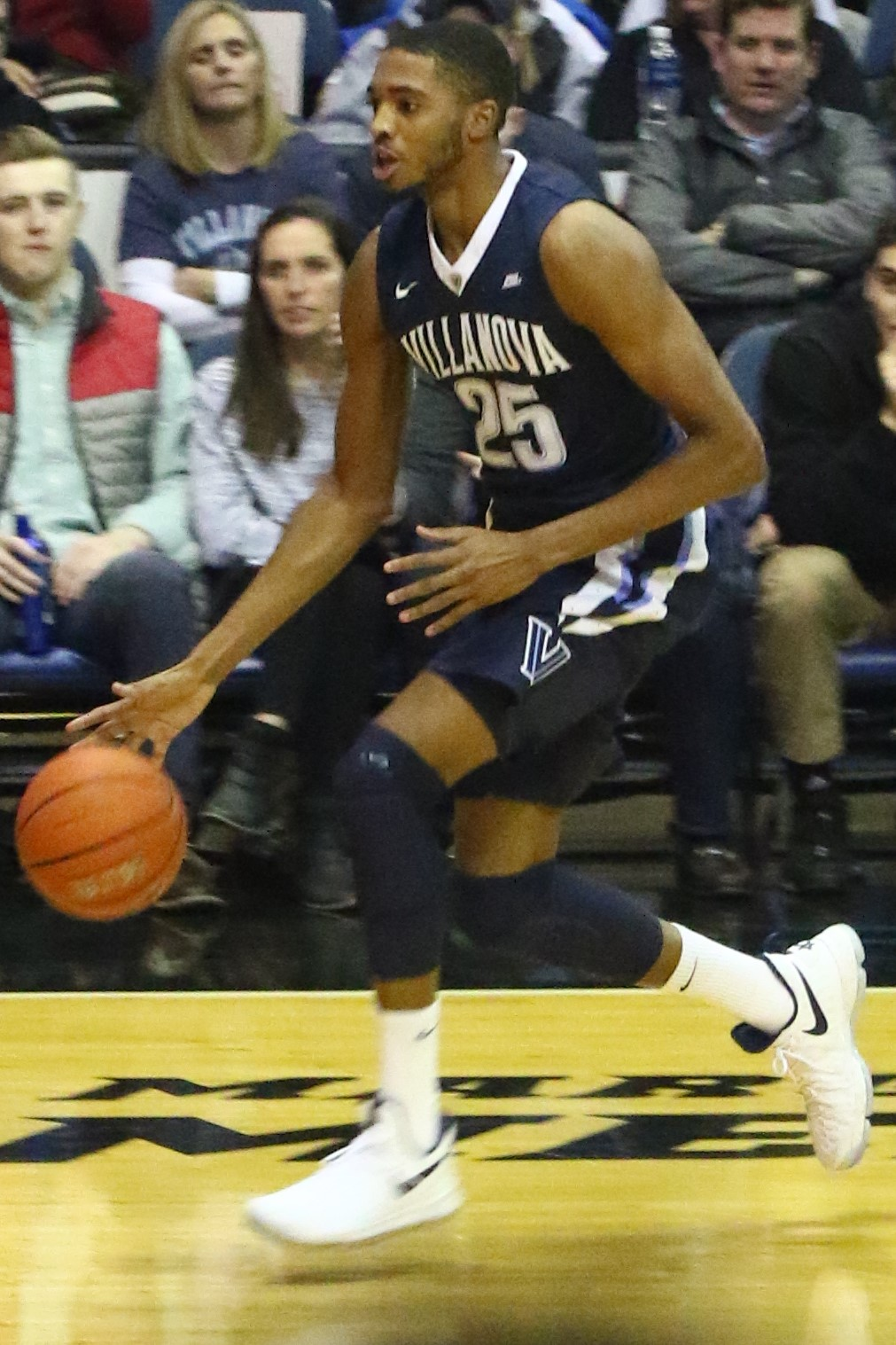
Bridges in 2017

Coming into the 2016–17 season, Bridges was slated to be the team's sixth man but started every game after Phil Booth went down with a knee injury in November. As a sophomore, Joe Juliano of The Philadelphia Inquirer wrote, "If there is such a thing as a five-tool player in college basketball, Mikal Bridges is the model." He became well-regarded as a lanky forward who could score and play excellent defense and often guarded the opposing team's best player. In the NCAA Tournament, he scored 13 points to help Villanova to a first round victory over Mount St. Mary's. Bridges averaged 9.8 points and 4.6 rebounds per game while making 54 percent of his field goal attempts and 39 percent of three point tries. He improved his scoring as the season progressed, averaging 12.3 points in his last 12 games of the regular season. Along with Creighton's Khyri Thomas and teammate Josh Hart, Bridges was one of three Big East defensive player of the year honorees, being third in the conference in steals with 1.9 per game.

=== Junior year ===
He was named to the 2017–18 preseason All-Big East second team. Bridges hit all six 3-point tries in a 24-point performance against Lafayette on November 17. On December 4, he scored a career-high 28 points to go with six rebounds and two blocks in an 88–72 victory over Gonzaga. Bridges scored 23 points in an overtime win against Seton Hall on March 2, 2018. At the conclusion of the regular season, he joined Jalen Brunson on the All-Big East first team. He was named MVP of the Big East tournament after scoring 28 points in the title game, a 76–66 overtime win over Providence.

As a junior Bridges averaged 17.7 points and 5.3 rebounds per game on 51 percent shooting, including 43.5 percent on 3-pointers. He received the Julius Erving Award for best small forward. On April 10, 2018, Bridges announced his intention to forgo his final season of collegiate eligibility and declare for the 2018 NBA draft, where he was the 10th selection in the first round by the Philadelphia 76ers. He was later traded to the Phoenix Suns in exchange for the 16th pick, Zhaire Smith, and an unprotected 2021 first-round pick.

== Professional career ==
=== Phoenix Suns (2018–2023) ===
==== Rookie and starting role (2018–2020) ====
Bridges was selected with the tenth overall pick by his hometown team the Philadelphia 76ers in the 2018 NBA draft and was subsequently traded to the Phoenix Suns in exchange for the draft rights to Zhaire Smith and a 2021 first-round pick. Bridges joined the Suns for the 2018 NBA Summer League. He signed a 4-year, $17.6 million rookie-scale contract with the Suns on July 6, 2018. On October 6, it was announced that Bridges would miss the remainder of the preseason with an elbow injury.

Bridges played in the Suns' regular season opener to make his professional debut in a blowout 121–100 win over the Dallas Mavericks on October 17, 2018. Three days later, Bridges recorded his first points, rebounds, and assists of his professional career with 10 points, 4 rebounds, 2 assists, and 2 steals in a blowout loss against the Denver Nuggets. On November 14, he made his first career start in place of Trevor Ariza, scoring eight points in 25 minutes in a 116–96 win over the San Antonio Spurs. On February 2, 2019, Bridges recorded a season-high 20 points in a 118–112 loss to the Atlanta Hawks. On February 25, Bridges put up a season-high 8 assists to help the Suns break a franchise-record 17-game losing streak to win 124–121 over the Miami Heat. From January 22 until March 6, Bridges would get at least one steal in each game played throughout that time. He became the first rookie since Chris Paul to obtain a steal per game throughout a 20-game stretch. It was also the second-longest stretch for a rookie in franchise history behind Ron Lee. At the end of the season, Bridges became the only Suns player to play in all 82 games for the regular season.

On November 19, 2019, Bridges matched his career-high of 20 points in a 120–116 loss to the Sacramento Kings. On December 14, he grabbed a then career-high 10 rebounds in his first start of the 2019–20 NBA season in a 121–119 overtime loss to the San Antonio Spurs in Mexico City. Bridges then matched his then career-high 10 rebounds two days later in a 111–110 loss to the Portland Trail Blazers. On January 18, Bridges scored a season-high 26 points on 6–8 three-point shooting in a 123–119 win over the Boston Celtics. On March 8, Bridges got his first double-double with 21 points while matching his then career-high of 10 rebounds in a 140–131 win over the Milwaukee Bucks. In the 2020 NBA Bubble, Bridges started in all eight games at small forward for the Suns.

==== Playoff success and trade (2021–2023) ====
On January 9, 2021, Bridges set a new career-high of 34 points in a 125–117 win over the Indiana Pacers. He also helped the Suns start their season with a 7–3 record, their best 10-game start to a season since 2009. On May 13, Bridges posted a double-double with 21 points and a career-high 11 rebounds in a 118–117 win over the Portland Trail Blazers. During Game 2 of the 2021 NBA Finals, Bridges scored 27 points in a 118–108 win to give the Suns a 2–0 series lead. However, the Suns went on to lose the Finals in 6 games to the Milwaukee Bucks.

On October 17, 2021, Bridges and the Suns agreed to a 4-year, $90 million rookie contract extension. Bridges and the Suns finished the regular season with the league's best overall record at 64–18. Bridges received universal praise from players, coaches, fans, and reporters for his defense, finishing second in Defensive Player of the Year voting and being selected to his first All-Defensive First Team. On April 26, 2022, Bridges scored a playoff career-high 31 points, including five rebounds and four blocks in a 112–97 Game 5 win against the New Orleans Pelicans. In the Western Conference Semifinals, the Suns jumped to a 2–0 lead in the series against the Dallas Mavericks before losing in seven games.

On November 9, 2022, Bridges scored a season-high 31 points along with nine rebounds, five assists and four steals in a 129–117 win over the Minnesota Timberwolves. On November 16, he recorded a near triple-double with 23 points, 9 rebounds and a career-high 9 assists in a 130–119 win over the reigning champion Golden State Warriors.

=== Brooklyn Nets (2023–2024) ===
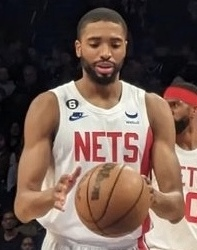
Bridges in 2023

On February 9, 2023, the Suns traded Bridges to the Brooklyn Nets, along with Cameron Johnson, Jae Crowder, four unprotected first-round picks, and a 2028 first-round pick swap in exchange for Kevin Durant and T. J. Warren. Upon joining the Nets, he was given the nickname, Brooklyn Bridges, a pun on the Brooklyn Bridge. On February 11, Bridges made his Nets debut, putting up 23 points, 6 rebounds and 2 steals in a 101–98 loss to the Philadelphia 76ers. On February 15, Bridges scored a career-high 45 points in a 116–105 win over the Miami Heat. On March 26, Bridges scored 44 points in a 119–106 loss against the Orlando Magic.

On April 3, Bridges took home his first NBA Player of the Week honor in his career. He led the Nets to an undefeated 3–0 week with averages of 33 points, 5.7 rebounds, 3.7 assists and 1.3 steals in wins against the Rockets, Hawks and Jazz. He recorded his third career 40-point game (all since being traded to the Nets) in the win over Atlanta, scoring 42 points.

On December 2, 2023, Bridges put up 42 points, with 26 of those coming in the first quarter, in a 129–102 win over the Orlando Magic. On December 6, Bridges put up 30 points alongside a game-winning jumpshot in a 114–113 win over the Atlanta Hawks.

=== New York Knicks (2024–present) ===
On July 6, 2024, Bridges was traded to the New York Knicks along with Keita Bates-Diop in exchange for Bojan Bogdanović, Shake Milton, Mamadi Diakite, five future first-round picks, a first-round pick swap, and a second-round pick. The trade reunited Bridges with his former Villanova teammates Jalen Brunson and Josh Hart, with the group given the nickname the "Villanova Knicks" or "Nova Knicks". They became the first trio of players to win both an NCAA and NBA championship together.

On October 22, 2024, Bridges made his Knicks debut, putting up 16 points on 7-of-13 shooting from the field and 2-of-7 from three-point range in a 132–109 loss to the Boston Celtics. On December 25, Bridges put up 41 points in a 117–114 win over the San Antonio Spurs on Christmas Day. On March 12, Bridges scored 33 points and hit a buzzer-beating three-pointer in overtime to secure a 114–113 win over the Portland Trail Blazers. Bridges started all 82 games for the Knicks during the 2024–25 NBA season, averaging 17.6 points, 3.2 rebounds, and 3.7 assists.

In Game 1 of the conference semifinals, Bridges secured the game-winning steal in a 108–105 overtime win over the defending champion Boston Celtics. In Game 2 of the Conference Semifinals, Bridges scored all 14 of his points in the 4th quarter and secured the game winning block in a 91–90 win as New York took a 2–0 series lead over the heavily-favored Celtics. For the second straight Playoff game, the Knicks came back from 20 points down to win, becoming the first team to ever do so. New York went on to eliminate Boston in six games, before ultimately falling to the Indiana Pacers in the Eastern Conference Finals.

On August 1, 2025, Bridges signed a four-year, $150 million extension through the 2029–30 season. Bridges started all 82 contests for New York during the 2025–26 season, averaging 14.4 points, 3.8 rebounds, and 3.7 assists.

In Game 5 of the NBA Finals, Bridges helped the Knicks achieve a 94–90 win and close out the NBA Finals against the San Antonio Spurs, 4–1, securing the Knicks' first NBA championship in 53 years, by scoring 14 points, grabbing 2 rebounds and getting 4 assists in that crucial game.

On November 21, 2026, Bridges hit a buzzer-beating three-pointer against the Portland Trailblazers to help the Knicks win 96-97.

== Consecutive games played streak ==
As of the conclusion of the 2025–26 season, Bridges has the longest active streak of consecutive games played in the NBA regular season with 638, and the longest iron man streak, whether continuing or broken, by any active NBA player. He was sidelined for one game upon being traded to Brooklyn, but the NBA determined that it would not count as a missed game, as he was not eligible to play and listed as "inactive - trade pending." Because he had already played 56 games in Phoenix prior to the trade and Brooklyn still had 27 games after the trade was finalized, on April 9, 2023, Bridges played his 83rd game of the season, becoming the 42nd player in NBA history to play 83 or more games during the regular season, and the first since Josh Smith in the 2014–15 season.

Although he redshirted his freshman year, Bridges otherwise never missed a game for Villanova either, playing in all 116 games for which he was eligible, and as such has not missed an organized, regular season basketball game for which he was eligible to play since high school.

== National team career ==
Bridges was a member of the United States national team that competed in the 2023 FIBA Basketball World Cup. Against Italy, he led the team with 24 points as they made the semis. There they lost to Germany, setting them up for a bronze medal match against Canada. In that bronze medal game, he was fouled with 4.2 seconds remaining and Team USA down by four. He made the first free throw, then intentionally missed the second to get his own offensive rebound and make a three-pointer that sent the game into overtime. However, Canada went on to win in overtime to claim the bronze as Team USA finished fourth in that tournament.

== Career statistics ==
Legend
GP	Games played	GS	Games started	MPG	Minutes per game
FG%	Field goal percentage	3P%	3-point field goal percentage	FT%	Free throw percentage
RPG	Rebounds per game	APG	Assists per game	SPG	Steals per game
BPG	Blocks per game	PPG	Points per game	**Bold**	Career high
†	Won an NBA championship	*	Led the league

=== NBA ===
==== Regular season ====
Year	Team	GP	GS	MPG	FG%	3P%	FT%	RPG	APG	SPG	BPG	PPG
2018–19	Phoenix	82*	56	29.5	.430	.335	.805	3.2	2.1	**1.6**	.5	8.3
2019–20	Phoenix	73	32	28.0	.510	.361	.844	4.0	1.8	1.4	.6	9.1
2020–21	Phoenix	72*	72*	32.6	**.543**	**.425**	.840	4.3	2.1	1.1	**.9**	13.5
2021–22	Phoenix	82*	82*	34.8	.534	.369	.834	4.2	2.3	1.2	.4	14.2
2022–23	Phoenix	**56***	**56***	36.4	.463	.387	**.897**	4.3	3.6	1.2	.8	17.2
2022–23	Brooklyn	**27***	**27***	34.2	.475	.376	.894	**4.5**	2.7	1.0	.6	**26.1**
2023–24	Brooklyn	82	82*	34.8	.436	.372	.814	**4.5**	3.6	1.0	.4	19.6
2024–25	New York	82	82*	**37.0**	.500	.354	.814	3.2	**3.7**	.9	.5	17.6
2025–26†	New York	82	82*	32.8	.490	.371	.827	3.8	**3.7**	1.3	.8	14.4
Career		638	571	33.2	.485	.371	.842	3.9	2.9	1.2	.6	14.7

==== Playoffs ====
Year	Team	GP	GS	MPG	FG%	3P%	FT%	RPG	APG	SPG	BPG	PPG
2021	Phoenix	**22**	**22**	32.1	.484	.368	.893	4.3	1.6	1.0	.7	11.1
2022	Phoenix	13	13	38.5	.478	.394	**.933**	4.7	2.8	1.1	**1.0**	13.3
2023	Brooklyn	4	4	**39.3**	.429	**.400**	.783	**5.3**	**4.0**	.5	.5	**23.5**
2025	New York	18	18	39.2	.456	.333	.750	4.5	2.9	**1.7**	.9	15.6
2026†	New York	19	19	32.0	**.559**	.365	.920	3.2	2.7	1.0	.3	13.5
Career		76	76	35.2	.486	.363	.869	4.2	2.6	1.1	.7	13.8

=== College ===
Year	Team	GP	GS	MPG	FG%	3P%	FT%	RPG	APG	SPG	BPG	PPG
2014–15	Villanova	Redshirt										
2015–16	Villanova	**40**	0	20.3	.521	.299	.787	3.2	.9	1.1	.7	6.4
2016–17	Villanova	36	33	29.8	**.549**	.393	**.911**	4.6	**2.0**	**1.7**	.9	9.8
2017–18	Villanova	**40**	**40**	**32.1**	.514	**.435**	.851	**5.3**	1.9	1.5	**1.1**	**17.7**
Career		116	73	27.3	.525	.400	.845	4.3	1.6	1.4	.9	11.3

== Personal life ==
Bridges is a fan of the Los Angeles Rams and Philadelphia Phillies.

In December 2023, Bridges stated in an interview for GQ that he had eaten at Chipotle Mexican Grill every day for the last ten years. In a 2024 interview, Bridges clarified that while he doesn't eat Chipotle's food every day, he eats it "3–4 out of 7 days [a week]."
