= Ireland–Russia relations =

- Ireland: Russia

Ireland and the Russian Federation maintain bilateral relations. Ireland has an embassy in Moscow, and Russia has an embassy in Dublin. Russia's embassy on Orwell Road is accused of being a hub for intelligence-gathering and online "influence operations", which it denies. Since the Russian annexation of Crimea in 2014, armed Russian bombers have deliberately flown into Irish-controlled airspace several times, having to be intercepted by the Royal Air Force. Russian spy ships have been observed mapping undersea communications cables and energy pipelines off Ireland's coast. There was also controversy over Russian plans to hold naval drills in Ireland's exclusive economic zone. Because of the 2022 Russian invasion of Ukraine, the Irish government imposed sanctions on Russia and expelled Russian diplomats suspected of espionage. Opinion polls in Ireland have found strong support for Ukraine. Russia responded by expelling Irish diplomats and declaring Ireland an "unfriendly country". The Irish security services say that Russian agents have covertly attempted to stoke unrest through dissident republicans, Ulster loyalists, and far-left and far-right activists.

== Soviet Russia ==
In June 1920, as part of the efforts by the Sinn Féin leadership to obtain international recognition of the Irish Republic, a draft treaty with the new Russian Soviet Federative Socialist Republic was circulated in Dublin. E. H. Carr, the historian of early Bolshevism, considered that "the negotiations were not taken very seriously on either side".

Patrick McCartan was to visit Moscow on the instructions of Éamon de Valera to make inquiries on the possibility of mutual recognition. However, before he proceeded "the Soviets had gone cold on ties with the Republic for fear of jeopardising trade negotiations with Britain."

In April 1920, Ireland provided a loan to the Soviet Union. Russian jewels were provided as security, and these jewels were secretly stored in a private suburban house in Dublin until 1938. The loan was repaid in 1948 and the jewels returned to Moscow.

Ireland did not recognize the USSR until 29 September 1973.

== Russian Federation ==
The Russian Federation became an independent state in 1991 after the breakup of the Soviet Union, and established relations with Ireland.

In February 2009, the Russian Navy aircraft carrier Admiral Kuznetsov caused a large oil spill while refuelling off the coast of County Cork. The Russians at first denied involvement, but eventually admitted to the spill. Russia refused to pay Ireland a bill of €155,000 for monitoring the oil spill, with a Russian embassy spokesman saying it did "no harm to the environment of Ireland".

On 1 February 2011, for the first time since 1983, the Irish government expelled a Russian diplomat based in Dublin after an investigation by the Garda Special Detective Unit (following a tip off from the United States Federal Bureau of Investigation) which found that the identities of six Irish citizens had been stolen and used as cover for Russian spies found to have been working in the United States.

An Irish citizen, Edel Mahady, was among 298 civilians killed when Russian-backed rebels shot down Malaysia Airlines Flight 17 in July 2014. It had been flying over rebel-held eastern Ukraine during the Donbas war when it was shot down by a Russian missile.

=== Russian bomber interceptions ===
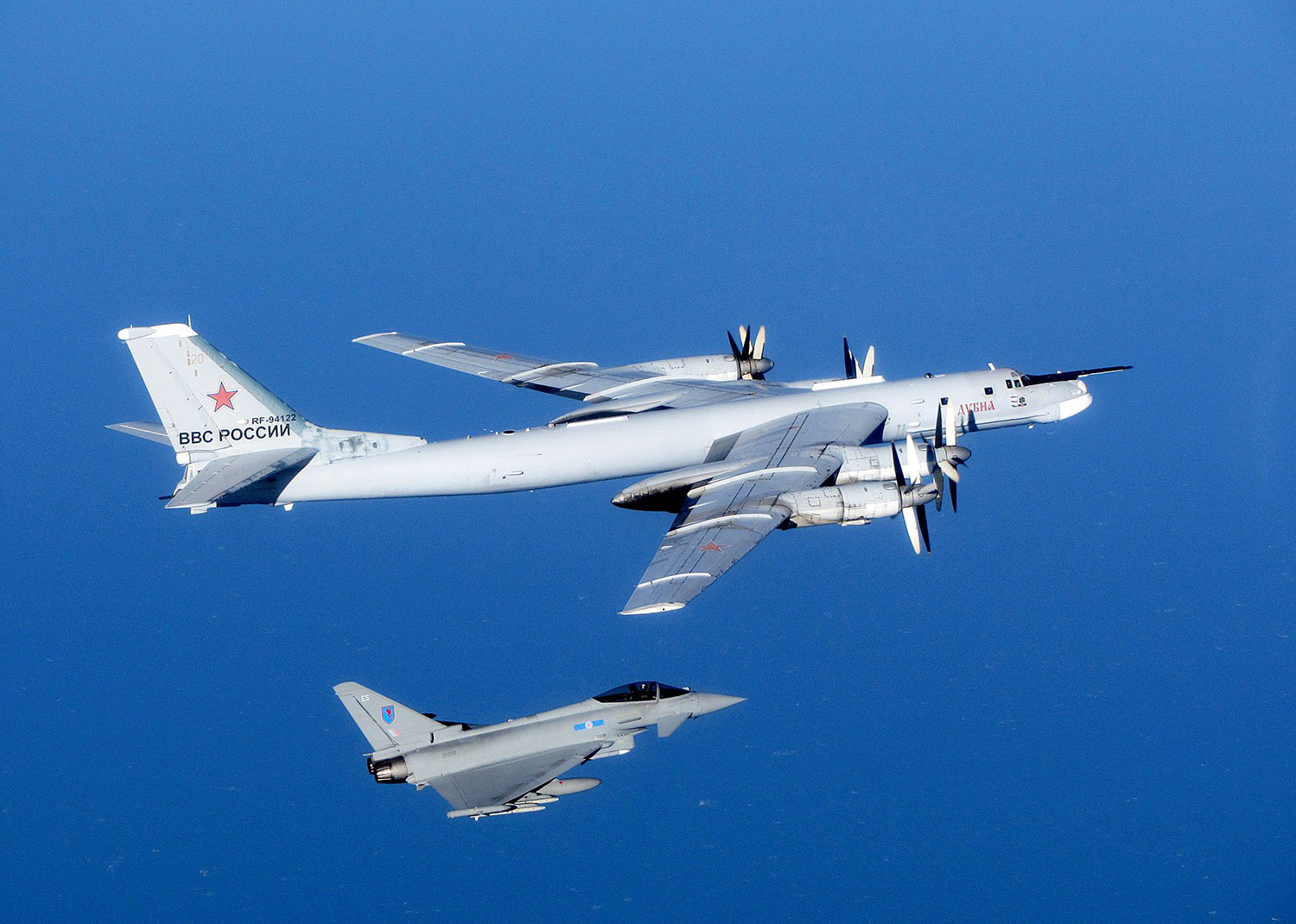
An RAF Typhoon intercepting a Russian Tupolev Tu-95 bomber in 2014

Since the 2010s, Russian bomber aircraft have deliberately flown into Irish-controlled airspace several times, without warning, and with their transponders switched off. As the Irish Air Corps lacks air defence, the British Royal Air Force (RAF) have had to intercept these bombers. It is believed that these provocative missions are meant to intimidate, to test RAF response time, and to gather intelligence on British-Irish air defence co-operation.

In February 2015, two Russian Tupolev Tu-95 "Bear" bombers flew into Irish-controlled airspace twice, with their transponders switched off. The Norwegian military confirmed that one of the bombers was carrying a nuclear warhead, having intercepted Russian military communications. The Irish Aviation Authority (IAA) was forced to delay flights and divert civilian passenger aircraft out of the path of the Russian bombers. The bombers flew within 25 nautical miles of the Irish coast, and were intercepted by RAF Eurofighter Typhoon jets scrambled from Britain.

=== Planned embassy expansion ===
In 2015, the Russian embassy in Dublin received planning permission to erect new buildings on its 2-hectare (4.9-acre) site on Orwell Road. Included on the planning application was a large underground complex, marked for storage and plant use, despite there being "plenty of room" to build above ground. Security experts warned that the underground complex could be used by Russian military intelligence. In March 2020, the Irish government scrutinized the plans and revoked building permission, on grounds that it could threaten national security.

On 26 March 2018, the Irish government expelled another Russian diplomat. The Taoiseach Leo Varadkar described the expulsion as "an act of solidarity with the United Kingdom" following a nerve agent attack in Salisbury earlier that month.

=== Russian naval drills controversy ===
There was controversy in January 2022, when Russia announced plans to hold naval drills about 150 nautical miles off the coast of County Cork, within Ireland's exclusive economic zone. It was to involve naval artillery and missiles. The Irish government warned citizens there would be would be "serious safety risks" in the area. Local fishermen, represented by the Irish South and West Fish Producers Association, protested to the Russian embassy that the drills could wipe out their catches and announced they would continue to fish in the area regardless. Russia's Ambassador to Ireland, Yury Filatov, warned the fishermen to "refrain from any provocative actions which might endanger all involved". Eventually, in response to a request from the Irish government, Russia's Minister of Defence Sergey Shoigu agreed to move the naval drills further away from Ireland "as a gesture of goodwill".

=== Russian invasion of Ukraine ===
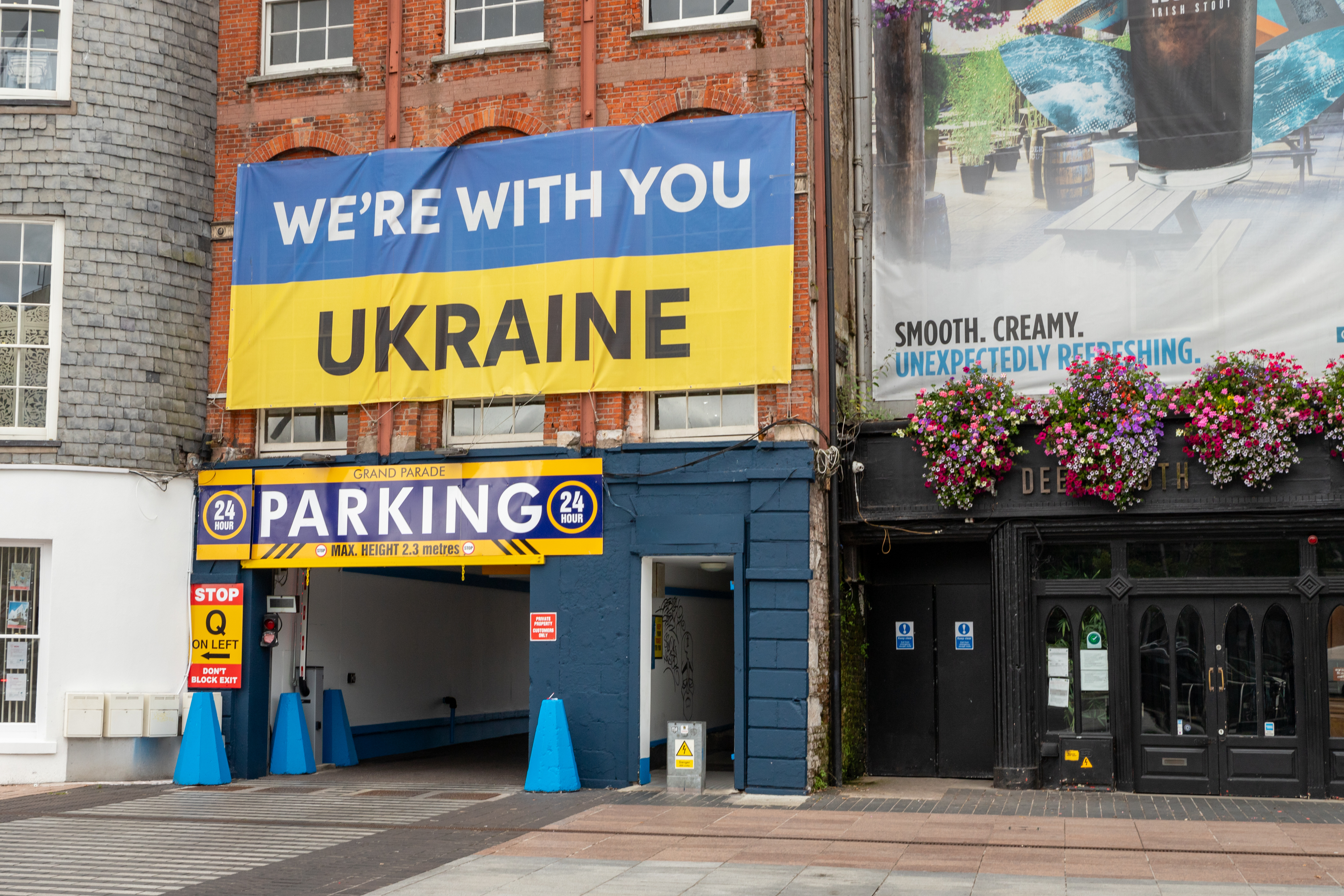
Banner in support of Ukraine, Cork

On 24 February 2022, the Irish government and opposition parties condemned Russia's invasion of Ukraine. Irish Taoiseach Micheál Martin called it an "immoral and outrageous breach of the most fundamental principles of international law" and a "shocking murderous act of aggression against a sovereign peaceful state". Ireland was one of many countries to impose sanctions on Russia, and Russia in turn added Ireland to its list of "unfriendly countries".

There were protests against the invasion outside the Russian embassy on Orwell Road in Dublin. One protester threw red paint over the Russian coat of arms. Another protester rammed a truck through the embassy gates. The embassy claimed that gardaí did nothing to stop the truck, calling the incident a "blatant violation" of international diplomatic law and demanding that the Irish state ensure the safety of its staff. Gardaí were forced to put up barriers around the building.

In April 2022, Irish citizen Finbar Cafferkey was killed while fighting in Ukraine's International Legion against the Russian invasion. The Tánaiste and Foreign Minister paid tribute to Cafferkey and expressed sympathy to his family. The Russian embassy in Dublin blamed the Irish government and media for his death, and warned that if such tributes "signify support for the Irish to take part in combat in Ukraine ... then Ireland would be the direct participant of the conflict with all the ensuing consequences". This statement was condemned by Irish politicians across the political spectrum.

In November, 2022, Russia's Ministry of Foreign Affairs announced that it had sanctioned 52 Irish politicians "in response to the anti-Russian course of the Irish government" over the invasion of Ukraine.

=== Alleged espionage and influence operations ===
After the invasion of Ukraine, it was highlighted that Russia had an unusually high number of diplomats working out of its Dublin embassy on Orwell Road, and that it had long been seen as a hub for Russian intelligence in western Europe.

The Irish government expelled four Russian diplomats in March 2022 because they had been identified as being engaged in espionage. One was a Russian military intelligence officer working under diplomatic cover from the embassy on Orwell Road. According to Irish security sources, the Russians had been in contact with both dissident republicans and Ulster loyalists in a plot to stoke social unrest. In one case, in August 2022, members of the Irish Republican Socialist Party (IRSP) and Russian nationalists staged a protest in Dublin against the Ukrainian military. The Irish security services said the Russian state organized the protest through its Dublin embassy.

In retaliation for the expulsion of the diplomats, Russia expelled two Irish diplomats from Moscow. The Irish foreign ministry said there was "no justification" to expel them.

In 2023, a symposium was held at the European Commission's office in Dublin, discussing how Ireland had become a target of online Russian disinformation. The symposium heard how it was being spread on social media by named Irish citizens as well as by entities operating from Africa and elsewhere.

In 2024, the head of the Garda's Security and Intelligence Bureau, Michael McElgunn, named Russia as one of a few countries spying in Ireland with "malign intent". He said Russia was seeking to support extremist groups and sow mistrust of the state. Cathal Berry, an independent TD with high-ranking military experience, said that Ireland was a "playground" for Russian agents and online disinformation operations. He said Ireland was a target because it was "the European base for so many US multinationals and technology companies", and had weak security.

The Sunday Times reported in October 2024 that "The Irish military and security services have identified a politician in the Oireachtas who has been recruited by Russian intelligence as an agent of influence". The security services briefed government ministers on the unnamed politician, who was referred to as "Agent Cobalt" in the media. There was much speculation as to the politician's identity. In August 2025, Garda HQ issued a statement that there was "an ongoing active criminal investigation".

=== Spy ships in Irish waters ===
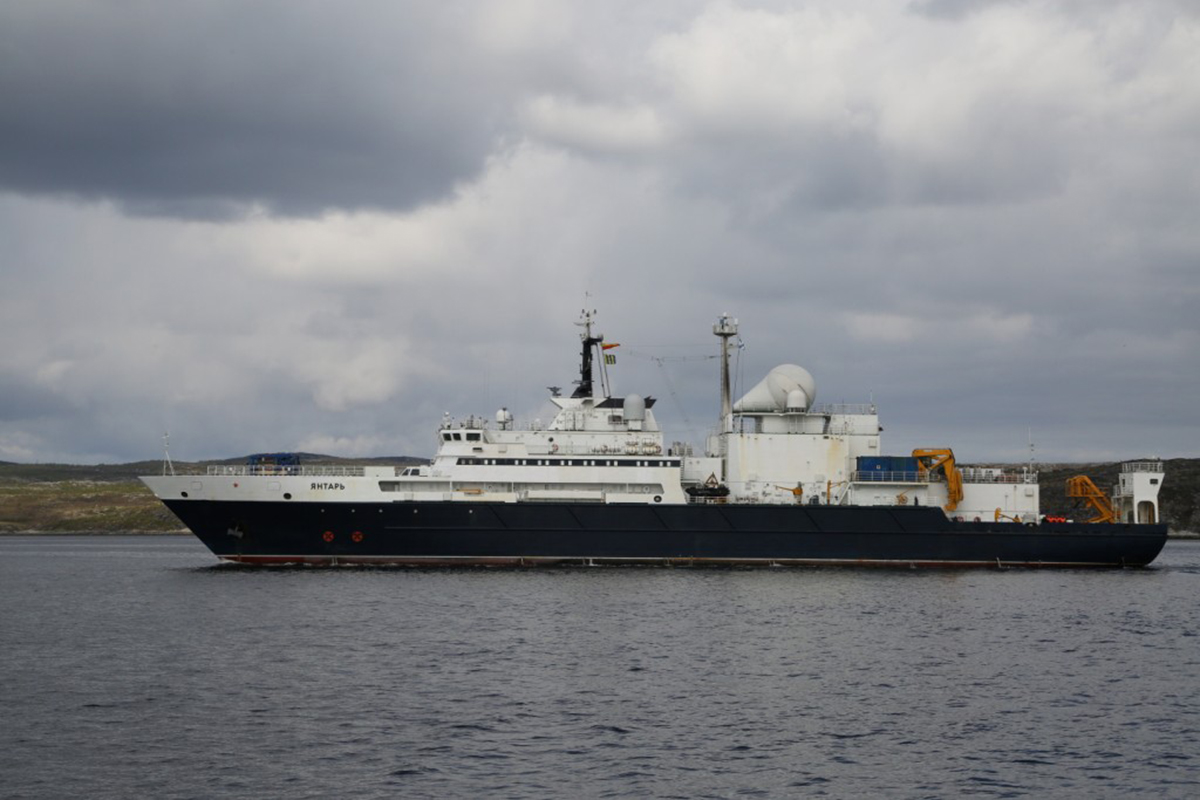
The Yantar, an alleged Russian spy ship

The Irish Navy and Air Corps have observed Russian "spy ships" which are believed to be mapping critical undersea communications cables and energy pipelines off the Irish coast. Some of them are escorted by Russian warships and are fitted with equipment for sabotaging undersea cables. In 2023, a Russian Navy submarine positioned itself directly outside the entrance to Cork Harbour, on the edge of Irish territorial waters. It was tracked and "chased off" by a British Royal Air Force helicopter and Royal Navy frigate, because Irish Navy ships do not have sonar.

== Resident diplomatic missions ==
- Ireland has an embassy in Moscow.
- Russia has an embassy in Dublin.

== See also ==
- Foreign relations of Ireland
- Foreign relations of Russia
- Ireland–NATO relations
- List of ambassadors of Russia to Ireland
- Russia–European Union relations
