= FIF =

FIF may refer to:

== Sport ==
- Frederiksberg IF, a Danish sports club
- Italian Football Federation, (Italian: formerly Federazione Italiana Football)
- Ivorian Football Federation (French: Fédération Ivoirienne de Football)

== Other uses ==
- Falah-e-Insaniat Foundation, Pakistani charity
- Air Finland, a defunct airline
- Federation of Irish Fishermen
- Fetus in fetu, developmental abnormality
- FiF file format
- Fife, historic county in Scotland, Chapman code
- Five Iron Frenzy, an American Christian ska band
- Forced inspiratory flow
- Forward in Faith, a movement within the Anglican Communion
- Falkland Islands Foundation, now part of Falklands Conservation
- Fight In Flight, a 2018 American animated webseries
