= Oleg Rakhmanin =

Soviet Russian politician and diplomat (1924 - 2010)

- Born: October 7, 1924; Dmitrov (Russian Socialist Federative Soviet Republic)
- Died: August 5, 2010 (aged 85)
- Alma mater: Tomsk Artillery School; Diplomatic Academy of the Ministry of Foreign Affairs of the Russian Federation
- Occupation: Diplomat, sinologist
- Employer: (1963–1987); (1987–)
- Children: Vladimir Rakhmanin
- Awards: Medal "For the Defence of Moscow"; Order of Friendship (41, 1984)
- Rank: lieutenant

Oleg Borisovich Rakhmanin (Russian: Олег Борисович Рахманин; October 7, 1924 – August 5, 2010) was a Soviet Russian politician and diplomat. Doctor of Sciences in Historical Sciences (1975), and professor (1977). Member of the Russian Academy of Natural Sciences, Russian Union of Journalists. Laureate of the USSR State Prize.

He graduated from the Tomsk Artillery School. He fought at the front and was wounded.

He started his career working at the USSR Embassy in the PRC (1951-1958), then studied at the Diplomatic Academy of the Ministry of Foreign Affairs of the Russian Federation from 1958–1960, before returning to the embassy to work from 1960-1963. In 1963, he began working in the Central Committee of the CPSU, remaining in the position until 1986, retiring in 1987.

Rakhmanin is the author more than 100 published scientific works.

His son is Vladimir Rakhmanin.
