= Boris Yeltsin circling over Shannon diplomatic incident =

Diplomatic incident

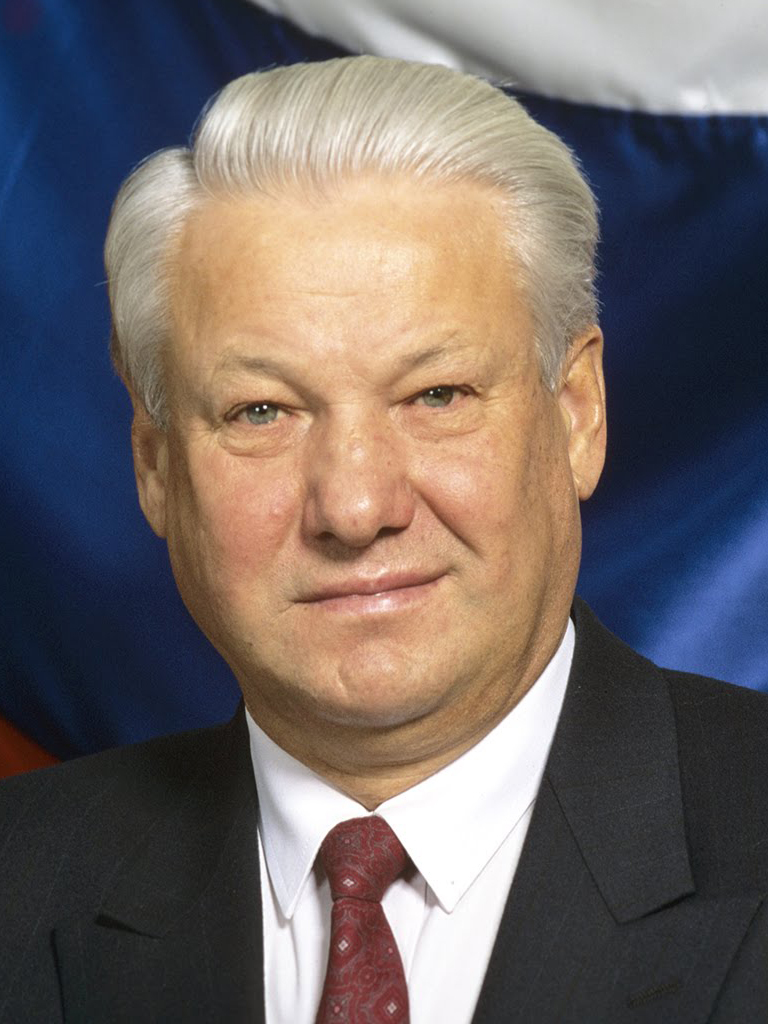
Boris Yeltsin

On 30 September 1994, Boris Yeltsin, then President of the Russian Federation, was scheduled for an official state visit to Ireland but failed to get off his plane when it landed at Shannon Airport. The incident embarrassed the Irish government, in particular Taoiseach Albert Reynolds, who was left standing at the foot of the stairs to Yeltsin's plane, and raised questions about Yeltsin's health and fitness to serve.

== Background ==
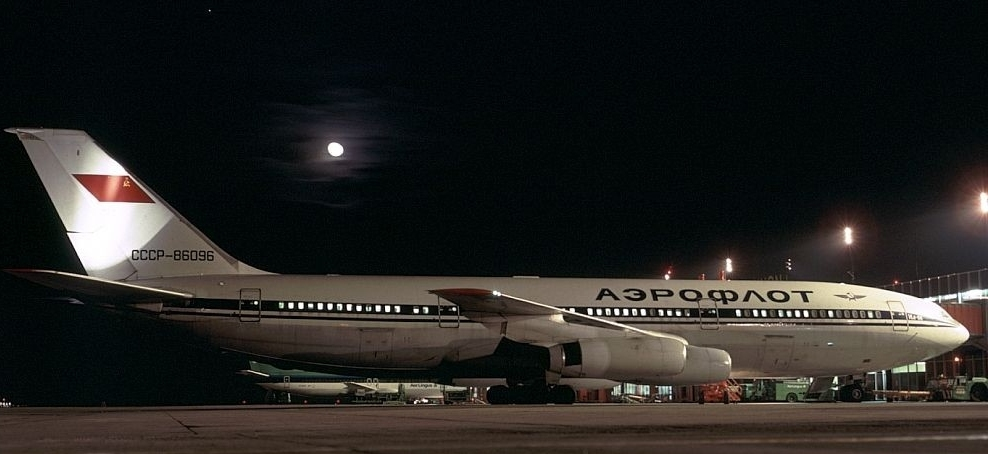
An Aeroflot Ilyushin Il-86 at Shannon airport in 1992

Boris Yeltsin had travelled to New York to address the United Nations General Assembly on 26 September 1994. He then travelled to Seattle, Washington, to promote trade relations between the United States and Russia. After delivering a speech, Yeltsin departed for Moscow via Shannon. The choice of Shannon was symbolic; in 1980, Aeroflot started operations there as its most western non-NATO hub in Europe.

The trip was scheduled at short notice. Reynolds was in Australia on official business when he learned of the intended stopover. He cut his visit short and returned to Ireland, landing at Shannon Airport just a few hours before Yeltsin's scheduled arrival. Thirty-one official vehicles waited on the runway to provide transportation to a formal reception at Dromoland Castle. The Irish Defence Forces brought in the band of the Southern Command and deployed one hundred soldiers of the 12th Infantry Battalion to serve as an honor guard.

Irish documents declassified in 2024 reveal that Liam Canniffe, the Irish diplomatic head of protocol, allowed for the possibility that Yeltsin could be "worse for wear" and therefore instructed the army to forgo the military honours if this were the case.

== Incident ==
Around 12:30 p.m. IST, an aircraft bearing the Russians’ advance party landed at Shannon. The official delegation, including Reynolds, the Russian ambassador to Ireland, Nikolai Kozyrev, Bertie Ahern (the Minister for Finance), Brian Cowen (the Minister for Transport, Energy and Communications), and Willie O'Dea (Minister of State) went to the runway to greet Yeltsin's plane, which was expected ten minutes later. The assembled dignitaries waited but Yeltsin's plane did not land. Airport officials reported that it was circling over Shannon and County Clare. After circling for an hour, the plane landed. However, Yeltsin did not appear when the plane's door opened. An Aeroflot official informed Kozyrev that Yeltsin was unwell and that the vice premier, Oleg Soskovets, would meet with the Irish delegation. Kozyrev and Canniffe were able to board the plane but were unable to see Yeltsin. Alexander Korzhakov, Yeltsin's bodyguard, told Kozyrev that Yeltsin was "very tired". Kozyrev returned to the runway and informed Reynolds that Yeltsin would not be making an appearance due to poor health. Reynolds replied, "Well now, if he is sick, there is nothing we can do about it. I am willing to talk to the Russian President's representative, but Mr. Yeltsin, my guest, is on Irish soil, and I cannot miss the opportunity to go on board the airplane for five minutes, shake the president's hand and wish him a speedy recovery." The Russians rejected this suggestion. Reynolds then agreed to meet Soskovets and gave orders for a meeting to be held in the airport. The Irish government commandeered the VIP lounge of Delta Air Lines to serve as the venue. Reynolds and Soskovets held a brief meeting and Yeltsin's plane departed immediately after it concluded.

== Aftermath ==
The immediate reaction in Ireland was uniformly negative. Yeltsin's problems with alcohol were well-known and the national and international media assumed that he had been too drunk to disembark from the plane (although in 2010, Tatyana Yumasheva, Yeltsin's daughter, suggested that her father had suffered a heart attack on the plane). The Irish Times ran a cartoon on its front page the next day which depicted a bottle of vodka bouncing down mobile stairs while an onlooker states, "At last a message from President Yeltsin." A large photo of Reynolds standing on the runway waiting for Yeltsin was printed on page three. The Irish Independent ran a photograph on its front page of Reynolds standing on the tarmac looking at his watch. Its editorial page stated, "When a statesman occupying one of the most pivotal positions imaginable neglects basic courtesy and insults his hosts, searching questions must be asked about his fitness to hold office." Upon his return to Moscow, Yeltsin stated that he had merely overslept: "I feel excellent. I can tell you honestly, I just overslept. The security services did not let in the people who were due to wake me—of course I will sort things out and punish them." The Irish Press criticised the lack of respect shown to Reynolds and suggested that Yeltsin's excuses be taken with "a large measure of vodka." Canniffe reported that the Russian deputy chief of protocol, Ilya Barakhvostov, stated that the Russians were "embarrassed by the turn of events."

Yeltsin wrote to Reynolds on October 4 to express "sincere regret that due to an unfortunate mishap our meeting at Shannon failed to take place." He invited Reynolds to visit Russia next year; however, Reynolds resigned as Taoiseach in November 1994.

Reynolds subsequently claimed that he had used the incident to extract favours from Yeltsin regarding the operation of Aer Rianta International in Russia. Maxine David at the University of Surrey supports Reynold's assessment. She notes that in the years following the Shannon incident Russian-Irish commercial aviation links strengthened.

The term "circling over Shannon" briefly became a euphemism in Ireland to describe the condition of a person who has had too much to drink. Pat Rabbitte TD suggested that the incident gave a whole new meaning to the concept of Shannon as a refuelling stop.
