= Dr. Bloodmoney =

1963 novel by Philip K. Dick

Dr. Bloodmoney, or How We Got Along After the Bomb
- Cover of first edition (paperback)
- Author: Philip K. Dick
- Cover artist: Jack Gaughan
- Language: English
- Genre: Science fiction
- Publisher: Ace Books
- Publication date: 1965
- Publication place: United States
- Media type: Print (hardback & paperback)
- Pages: 222

Dr. Bloodmoney, or How We Got Along After the Bomb is a 1965 science fiction novel by American writer Philip K. Dick. It was nominated for the Nebula Award for Best Novel in 1965.

Dick wrote the novel in 1963 with working titles In Earth's Diurnal Course and A Terran Odyssey. Ace editor Donald Wollheim, however, suggested the final title which references the film Dr. Strangelove or: How I Learned to Stop Worrying and Love the Bomb (1964).

== Plot summary ==
Dr. Bloodmoney is set in a post-apocalyptic future. In 1972, before the start of the narrative, Dr. Bruno Bluthgeld (German for "Blood-Money") had led a project testing nuclear weapons as a protectionary measure against Communist China and the Soviet Union. However, a miscalculation caused an atmospheric nuclear accident leading to widespread fallout and mutations. More recently the United States has been involved in a prolonged period of hostilities with China and the Soviet Union erupting in a war in Cuba.

In 1981, the now universally hated Bluthgeld seeks psychotherapy with Dr. Stockstill for his paranoia and guilt. Meanwhile, Stuart McConchie, Hoppy Harrington and Jim Fergesson, employees at Modern TV Sales and Service in Berkeley, California, go through a fairly typical day, pausing to watch Walt and Lydia Dangerfield being launched into orbit in the first stage of a colonization mission to Mars. This ordinary day, however, is disrupted by a massive nuclear strike. Orbiting overhead, Walt Dangerfield witnesses the tragic events as they unfold, while other characters are reduced to desperate measures in their struggle for survival. Fergesson is killed as his shop collapses. Meanwhile, Bluthgeld is convinced that he caused the strike in response to a universal conspiracy against him. Believing that he has shown the world his power, he sets out to heal and restore order through his imagined magical powers.

The narrative jumps to 1988, when many communities have begun to rebuild a sort of order. A military government has arisen in Cheyenne, Wyoming, while in California government is by local community councils that view one another with varying degrees of hostility. Most pre-war technologies and amenities have been lost. Oil shortages result in disabled cars being pulled by horses or fitted with wood-burning (steam) engines. Former California ranch territory has been converted into agricultural land for corn and other crops. Human mutants have become more common, such as phocomeli, as well as conjoined symbiotes. At the same time, former domestic animals like dogs and cats have undergone mutations that have greatly enhanced their intelligence. Many of these former pets and zoo specimens have allied themselves into ferocious tribal units of their own. Bruno Bluthgeld's dog Terry is capable of imitating simple human speech, while some species of felines may have developed their own evolved languages.

Walt Dangerfield, equipped with enough rations to last for several more years, along with an extensive collection of books and musical recordings, has become an orbiting disc jockey. His broadcasts offer a semblance of continuity with pre-war civilization to the isolated settlements of the postwar world. His wife, Lydia, committed suicide during the intervening period. Now, Dangerfield is showing symptoms of an unknown medical condition, causing concern among some of his listeners.

In Marin County, survivors including Bonny Keller, Dr. Stockstill, June Raub and Hoppy Harrington have formed a self-governing community. Harrington, who was born with all four limbs missing as a result of thalidomide, harbors a deep-seated resentment toward the patronizing attitudes he faced before the war. With the help of electronic servo-mechanisms and his developing psychokinetic abilities, he has become a skilled mechanic and an important member of the community.

Despite the respect he has earned, Harrington intends to dominate and humiliate the other members of the community. He increasingly uses his growing powers in unpredictable and violent ways to intimidate them. He has also been gradually weakening Walt Dangerfield in an attempt to seize control of Dangerfield's much-valued satellite transmissions.

Meanwhile, Bluthgeld, using the assumed name Jack Tree, lives as a sheep farmer outside the community. When an outsider searching for the notorious Bluthgeld is discovered by Bonny Keller, he is promptly executed.

Stuart McConchie has become a travelling entrepreneur in the post-apocalyptic world, selling "smart" robotic rat traps for a company based in post-war Berkeley. Still holding onto his ambitious pre-war salesman's mentality, McConchie travels to Marin County to meet Andrew Gill, a cigarette and alcohol entrepreneur, to discuss the re-introduction of automation within his factory as an agent of Berkeley-based business interests. His appearance in West Marin startles Hoppy Harrington and Bruno Bluthgeld, both of whom had last seen McConchie on the day of the "Emergency".

Bluthgeld's increasing psychosis eventually leads to the discovery of his identity. His magical powers, however, do not appear to be entirely imaginary. In his ardent desire to silence the talking satellite he seems to initiate another series of atmospheric explosions merely by willing them to occur. Hoppy, viewing him as a potential rival as well as a direct threat to the community and the planet itself, kills him from several miles away. Harrington employs his own psychokinetic powers in flinging the mad scientist high into the air and then simply letting him fall back to the ground. The Marin County council decides to thank Hoppy by presenting him with gifts of Gill's tobacco, alcohol and a monument in Harrington's honor, but Hoppy scorns these gifts as being much less than he deserves. Bonny Keller begins to worry that Hoppy will set himself up as a vindictive little tin god, and so she flees the county with Gill and McConchie in hopes of eventually settling beyond the reach of his powers.

Meanwhile, Edie Keller's conjoined twin brother Bill, a sentient fetus within her body, has been yearning for an independent existence. Bill Keller is able to communicate telepathically with the dead, and they warn him how dangerous Hoppy is becoming. When Edie approaches Hoppy's house, Harrington uses his powers to draw Bill outside of her in hopes of causing him to perish. Little Bill has a near-lethal adventure inside of an owl before finally engineering a body-swap with Hoppy which quickly proves fatal to Harrington. The idol with feet of clay has finally been toppled.

At the conclusion of the book, Dr. Stockstill begins a course of psychotherapy, broadcast over the radio, with Walt Dangerfield, who seems to be slowly recovering from his illness in the absence of a jealous Hoppy Harrington's debilitating mental emanations.

== Characters ==
Hoppy Harrington A phocomelus with psychokinetic powers and the ability to perfectly imitate voices. Having faced discrimination before the war, Hoppy seeks power and respect through his work as a mechanic and his plot to replace Walt Dangerfield. In an afterword to the 1980 Dell paperback edition, Dick noted, "It is not so much that Hoppy is evil but that his power is evil... [he] epitomizes the monster in us: the person who is hungry... for coercive control over others... It is compensation for what he lacked from birth. Hoppy is incomplete, and he will complete himself at the expense of the entire world."

Bruno Bluthgeld aka Jack Tree, aka Dr. Bloodmoney. An atomic physicist, Bluthgeld's miscalculations caused the pre-war Emergency and made him the object of worldwide hatred. He goes into hiding as sheep farmer Jack Tree. Bluthgeld is subject to paranoia, magical thinking, and megalomania; he may or may not actually have magical powers. Dick said of the character, "I have to confess to an overly simple view of Doctor Bluthgeld: I hate him and I hate everything he stands for... I cannot fathom his mind; I cannot understand his hates. It is not the Russians I fear; it is the Doctor Bluthgelds, the Doctor Bloodmoneys, in our own society, that terrify me... [He] is sick, and sick in a way that is dangerous to the rest of us."

Walter Dangerfield Slated to be the first colonist of Mars, Dangerfield was orbiting the Earth in a satellite waiting for his final rocket firing when the nuclear war occurred. Stuck in orbit, Dangerfield becomes a popular disc jockey. His wife Lydia had committed suicide shortly after the outbreak of war. Dick said of the character, "[he] is transformed from a man assisting the fragmented postwar society, giving it unity and strength, raising its morale, to a man desperate for help from it... He signifies isolation, which is the horror of the many down below: isolation and a loss of the objects and values that comprised their original world."

Bonny Keller A friend and former colleague of Bluthgeld, Bonny attempts to protect him when he goes into hiding. She has affairs with numerous men including Hal Barnes and Andrew Gill.

Stuart McConchie An African-American salesman, Stuart moves from selling television sets before the war to selling automated traps to kill mutant animals after the war. He expresses disgust for Hoppy Harrington and all "unnatural" results of the Emergency's nuclear fallout. His optimistic personality and salesmanship remain largely unchanged by the post-apocalyptic environment. Dick stated Stuart was his favorite character in the novel and the one whom he most identified with, and whose immediate perception of Bluthgeld as insane is more insightful than Bonny's view of the man, despite the latter's being formed from extensive personal knowledge.

Edie Keller Daughter of Bonny Keller and Andrew Gill. Edie tells everyone she has a twin brother, assumed by everyone to be an imaginary friend but really being a sentient fetus in fetu named Bill.

Bill Keller Edie's brother, a fetus in fetu within her body. He depends on Edie for sustenance and for reports of her sense perceptions, but independently has telepathic contact with the dead.

Andrew Gill A tobacco and alcohol merchant, he has a chance sexual encounter with Bonny Keller immediately after the nuclear strike, during which Edie Keller is conceived. In love with Bonny, Gill chooses to remain in West Marin, manufacturing ersatz tobacco and liquor.

Eldon Blaine An eyeglasses salesman who attempts first to kidnap Hoppy Harrington, and later to steal Hoppy's radio, for his own community. He is murdered by Hoppy.

Dr. Stockstill A psychiatrist before the war, Stockstill later becomes a general practitioner. He attempts to treat Bluthgeld and Dangerfield.

Mr. Austurias The West Marin school teacher, and an avid mushroom collector. He is killed for prying into Jack Tree's identity.

Jim Fergesson Owner of Modern TV Sales and Service, Fergesson is committed to non-discriminatory hiring practices, and consequently hires Stuart McConchie and Hoppy Harrington. He dies instantly during the nuclear strike.

June Raub A community leader of West Marin, who relishes the opportunity the war provides her for proving her worth.

Hal Barnes Mr. Austurias' replacement as West Marin schoolteacher, Barnes has an affair with Bonny Keller, who comes to view him as a coward.

== Other versions ==
Dick assembled excerpts from Dr. Bloodmoney into a short story in 1964. This version, titled A Terran Odyssey, was first published in volume five of The Collected Stories of Philip K. Dick in 1987.

== Sources ==
- Briasco, Luca, (2006). "«Early in the bright sun-yellowed morning»: Cronache del dopobomba tra mainstream e genere", Trasmigrazioni eds. De Angelis and Rossi, Firenze: Le Monnier, 2006, pp. 188–95.
- Butler, Andrew, (2007). The Pocket Essential Philip K.Dick: Harpenden: Pocket Essentials: ISBN 1-903047-29-3
- Jameson, Fredric, (1975). "After Armageddon: Character Systems in Dr Bloodmoney", Science-Fiction Studies #5, 2:1, pp. 31–42.
- Rossi, Umberto (2009). "Acousmatic Presences: From DJs to Talk-Radio Hosts in American Fiction, Cinema, and Drama", Mosaic, 42:1, March, pp. 83–98.
- Spinrad, Norman, (1977). "Introduction", in Philip K. Dick, Dr. Bloodmoney, or How We Got Along After the Bomb, Boston: Gregg Press.
