= Ireland–Ukraine relations =

- Ireland: Ukraine

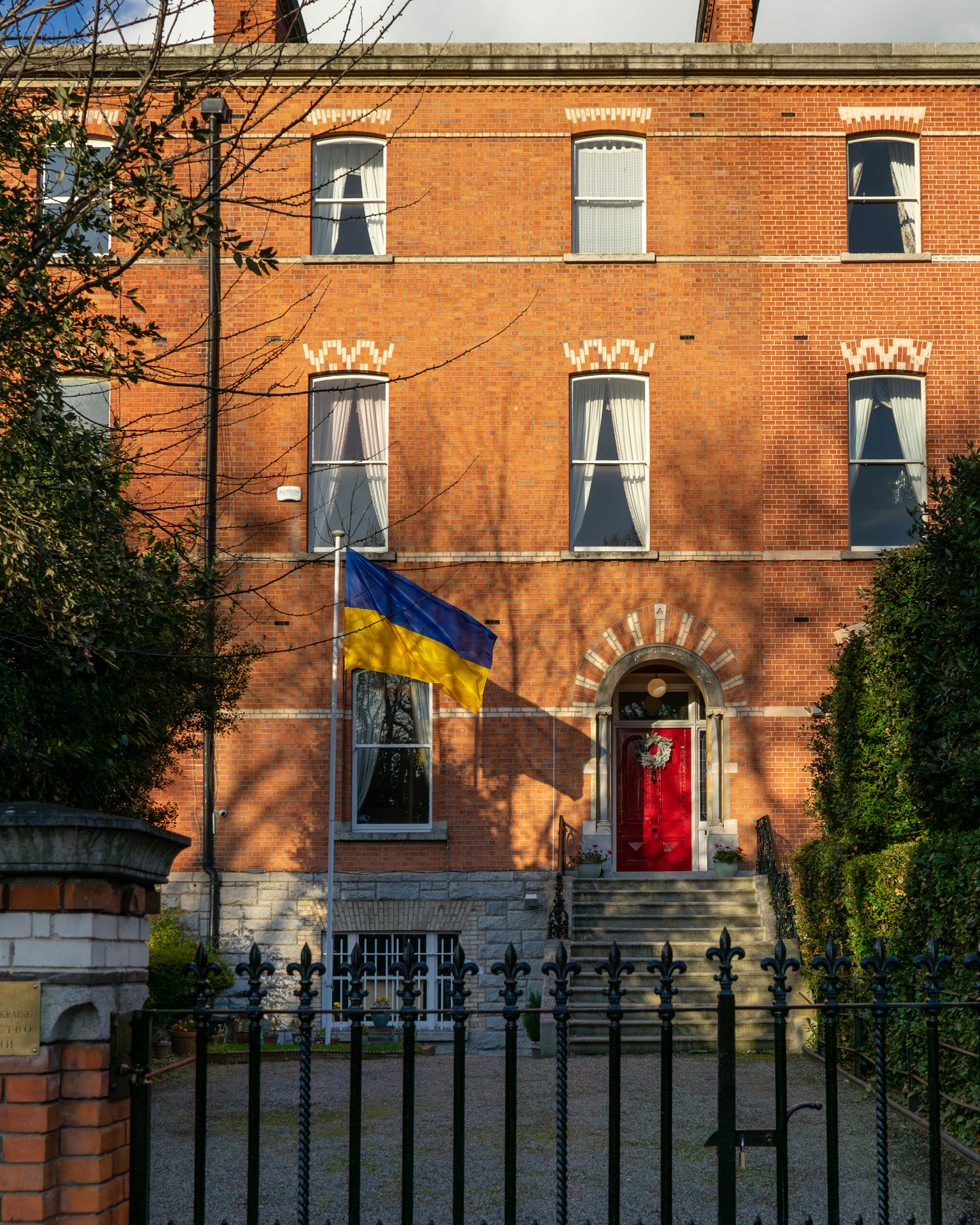
Embassy of Ukraine in Dublin

Ireland–Ukraine relations are bilateral relations between the Republic of Ireland and Ukraine. Ireland has an embassy in Kyiv and Ukraine has an embassy in Dublin. Both countries are members of the Council of Europe and of the Organization for Security and Co-operation in Europe. Ireland and Ukraine have similar histories as countries ruled by a larger neighbour and seeking independence, from the British Empire and Russian Empire/Soviet Union respectively. The Irish government and all opposition parties condemned the Russian invasion of Ukraine, which started the biggest and deadliest war in Europe since World War II. Opinion polls in Ireland have found strong support for Ukraine in the war. Ireland sent humanitarian aid, non-lethal military aid, and financial aid to Ukraine, amounting to 0.1% of Irish GDP by 2026. Ireland also imposed sanctions on Russia, prompting Russia to declare Ireland an "unfriendly country".

== History ==
Ireland and Ukraine have had similar histories as countries under imperial rule by a larger neighbour, the British Empire and Russian Empire respectively. Ireland underwent Anglicisation; the country was colonised by British settlers and the Irish language was suppressed. Likewise, Ukraine underwent Russification; the country was colonised by Russians and the Ukrainian language was suppressed. Both countries suffered devastating famines under foreign rule: The Great Famine in Ireland and the Holodomor in Ukraine. The Irish War of Independence and Ukrainian War of Independence were both fought during and after the First World War. While Ireland gained independence from the United Kingdom, Ukraine did not gain independence from the Soviet Union until 70 years later. The former imperial powers of Britain and Russia continued to see Ireland and Ukraine as part of their sphere of influence after independence. A 1994 opinion piece in The New York Times suggested that "Ukraine is to Russia as Ireland is to Britain".

Ireland recognized the newly independent Ukraine on 31 December 1991. Diplomatic relations were established shortly after on 1 April 1992.

Ukraine opened its embassy in Dublin, Ireland in August 2003. Ireland has had an embassy in Kyiv since June 2021.

On 24 February 2022, the Irish government condemned Russia's invasion of Ukraine as an "immoral and outrageous breach of the most fundamental principles of international law" and a "shocking murderous act of aggression against a sovereign peaceful state". Ireland was one of many countries to impose sanctions on Russia, and Russia in turn added Ireland to its list of "unfriendly countries".

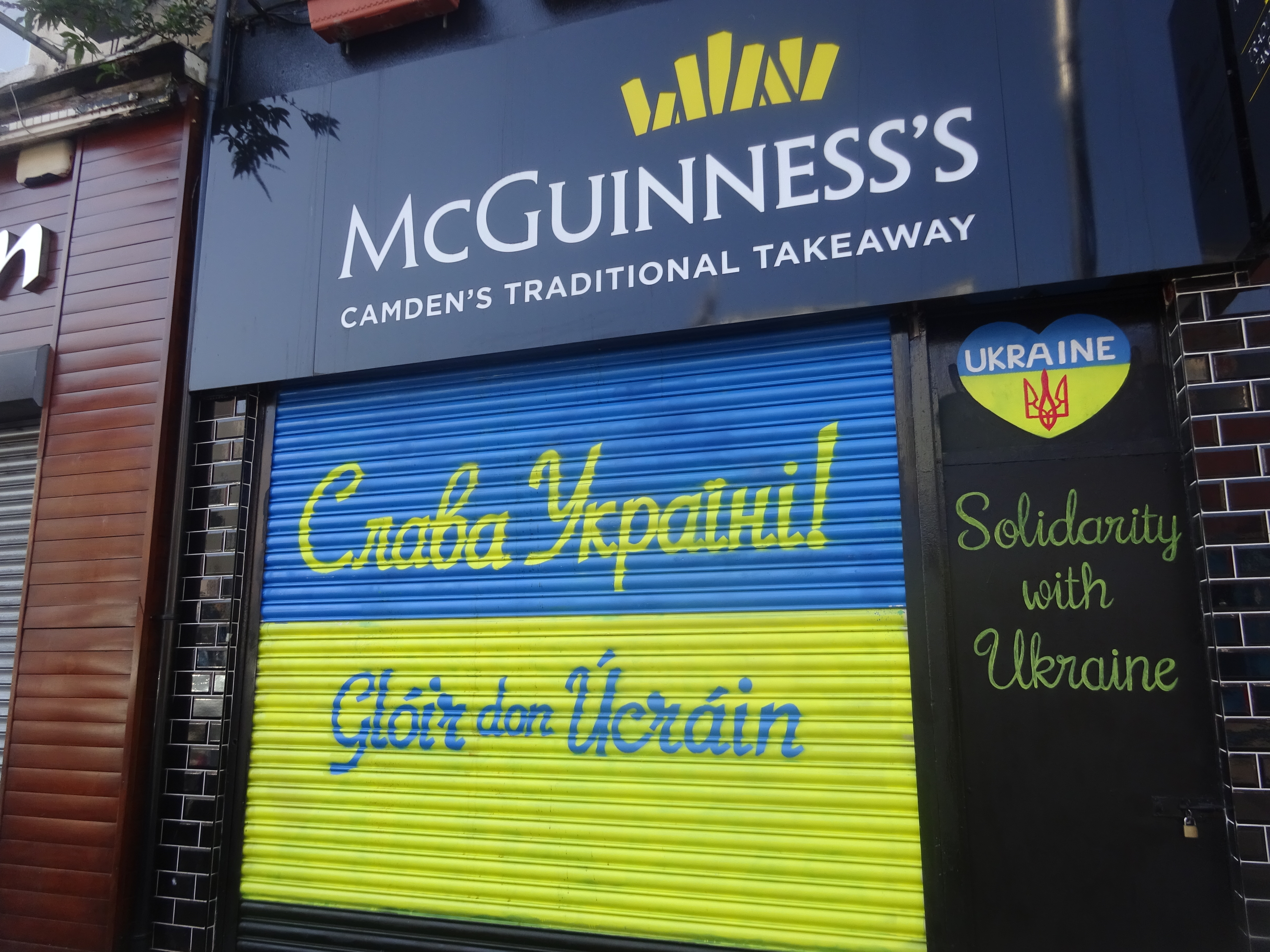
A Ukrainian solidarity mural in Dublin, written in Ukrainian (Slava Ukraini), Irish (Glóir don Úcráin), and English (Solidarity with Ukraine).

There were protests in support of Ukraine and against the Russian invasion, including daily protests outside the Russian embassy in Dublin. One protester threw red paint over the Russian coat of arms. Another protester rammed a truck through the embassy gates. The embassy claimed that gardaí (police) did nothing to stop the truck, calling the incident a "blatant violation" of international diplomatic law and demanding that the Irish state ensure the safety of its staff. Gardaí were forced to put up barriers around the building.

After the Russian invasion of Ukraine, the Irish embassy in Ukraine closed for six months, with staff working remotely; it reopened in August 2022. In November 2024, staff were told to work from home due to escalating tensions.

Between February 2022 and September 2024, Ireland took in almost 110,000 Ukrainian refugees through the Beneficiaries of Temporary Protection scheme.

Ireland has sent both humanitarian aid and non-lethal military aid to Ukraine, as the Republic is a neutral country. This has included medical supplies, fuel, helmets and body armour, military pickup trucks and transport trucks, as well as remote-controlled mine clearing vehicles and five Giraffe Mark IV radar systems.

Irish soldiers have helped to train Ukrainian soldiers in basic military skills, leadership training, drill instructor training, combat medicine, demining and bomb disposal since April 2023.

A number of Irish citizens joined the Ukrainian armed forces to fight against the Russian invasion, and several have been killed. In April 2023, Irish citizen Finbar Cafferkey was killed while fighting in Ukraine's International Legion. The Tánaiste and Foreign Minister paid tribute to Cafferkey and expressed sympathy to his family. The Russian embassy in Dublin blamed the Irish government and media for his death, and warned that if such tributes "signify support for the Irish to take part in combat in Ukraine ... then Ireland would be the direct participant of the conflict with all the ensuing consequences". This statement was condemned by Irish politicians across the political spectrum.

In November 2026, Ukraine's president Volodymyr Zelenskyy visited Ireland for the 9th summit of the European Political Community. The Taoiseach, Micheál Martin, said that Ireland was in talks to use Ukrainian drone technology for Irish maritime security. Zelenskyy thanked Ireland for its "unwavering support" and said Ukraine was ready for the co-production of drones with Ireland.

=== High level visits ===
From Ireland to Ukraine

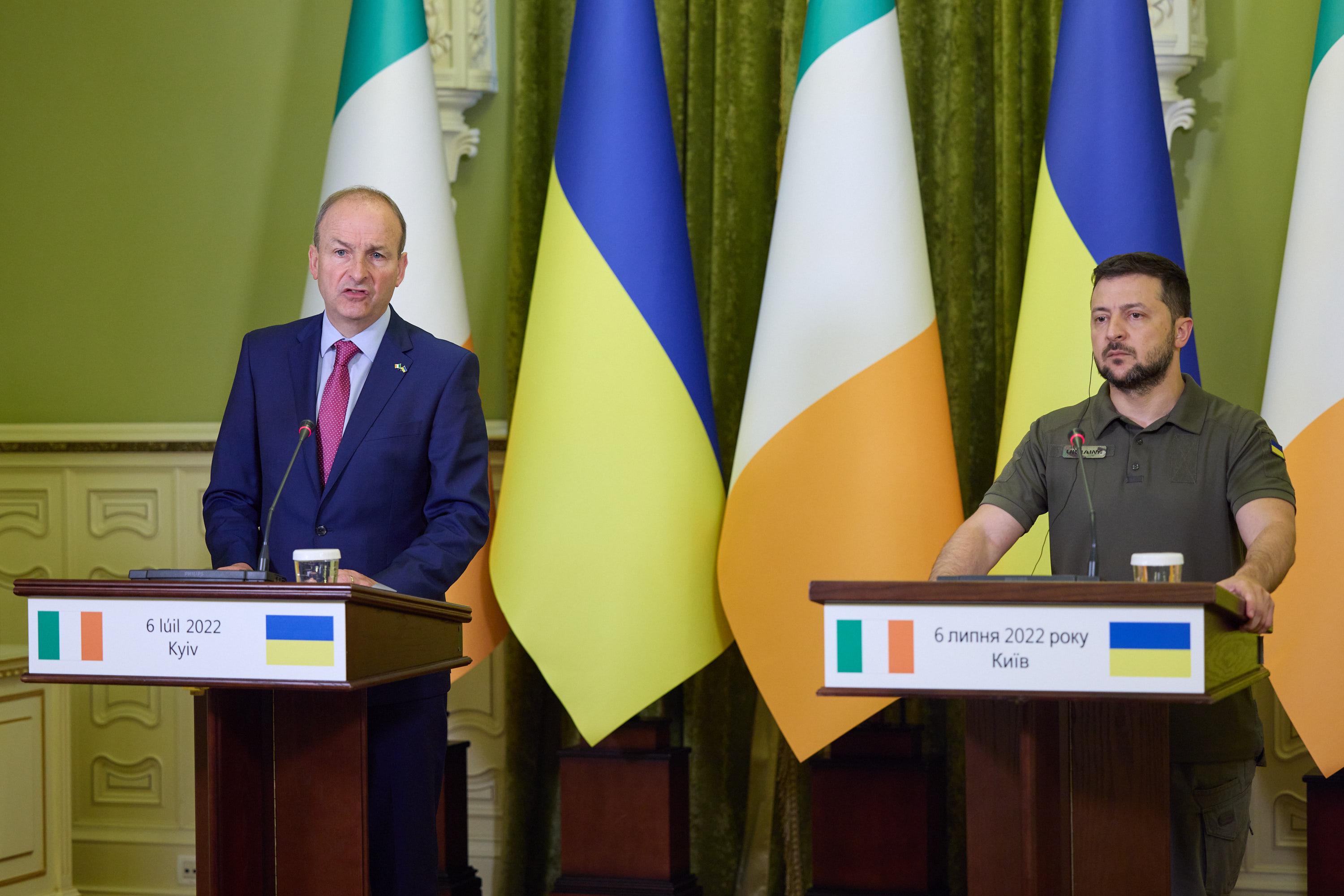
The taoiseach (prime minister), Micheál Martin (left), and president, Volodymyr Zelenskyy (right), in Kyiv on 6 July 2022

- On 12–14 April 2022, the Irish minister for foreign affairs and minister for defence Simon Coveney and Ireland's ambassador to Ukraine Thérèse Healy visited Ukraine where Coveney met his counterparts, Ukraine foreign minister Dmytro Kuleba and defence minister Oleksii Reznikov, in Kyiv and visited the site of the Bucha massacre the following day. Coveney travelled via Poland and was the first foreign minister on the UN Security Council to visit Ukraine since the Russian invasion began in February. He was also accompanied by a political adviser and a protection team.
- On 6 July 2022, the taoiseach, Micheál Martin, travelled to Kyiv to meet the president, Volodymyr Zelenskyy, as part of a visit to discuss how Ireland and the European Union could support Ukraine.
- On 19 July 2023, the taoiseach, Leo Varadkar, paid a surprise visit to embattled Ukraine where he met President Volodymyr Zelenskyy, Prime Minister Denys Shmyhal, Speaker of the Verkhovna Rada (parliament) Ruslan Stefanchuk, and members of the Irish community.
- On 4 September 2024, the taoiseach, Simon Harris, arrived overnight by train at Nemishaieve station in Kyiv. He and Zelenskyy signed a joint memorandum on mutual co-operation; Harris once again invited the president to visit Ireland; Zelenskyy thanked Ireland for welcoming over 100,000 refugees from his country; Harris toured the war-damaged Kyiv Oblast region and said he hoped Ukraine would in due course become a member of the European Union.

From Ukraine to Ireland

- On 6 April 2022, President Volodymyr Zelenskyy addressed both houses of the Oireachtas (Irish parliament) in a virtual visit to Ireland by video link.
- On 13 July 2024, Zelenskyy held a bilateral meeting with the taoiseach, Simon Harris, during a stopover at Shannon Airport while returning to Ukraine from the United States. At a press conference after the meeting, Harris said he had invited Zelenskyy to make a formal state visit to Ireland and that the latter was eager to address the Dáil in person. Harris also revealed that he would visit Kyiv soon (he did so two months later).
- On 27 February 2025, Zelenskyy met the taoiseach, Micheál Martin, at a stopover at Shannon Airport during a flight from Ukraine to the United States. The taoiseach said afterwards that he was open to Ireland helping in any possible future peacekeeping role in Ukraine.
- On 1–2 December 2025, Zelenskyy and his wife Olena Zelenska made their first official state visit to Ireland.
- On 1 July 2026, Zelenskyy visited Ireland as the country began its six-month Presidency of the Council of the European Union.

== Ambassadors ==
As of 2024, the Ukrainian ambassador to Ireland was Gerasko Larysa, having been appointed to the role in April 2021.

== Public opinion ==
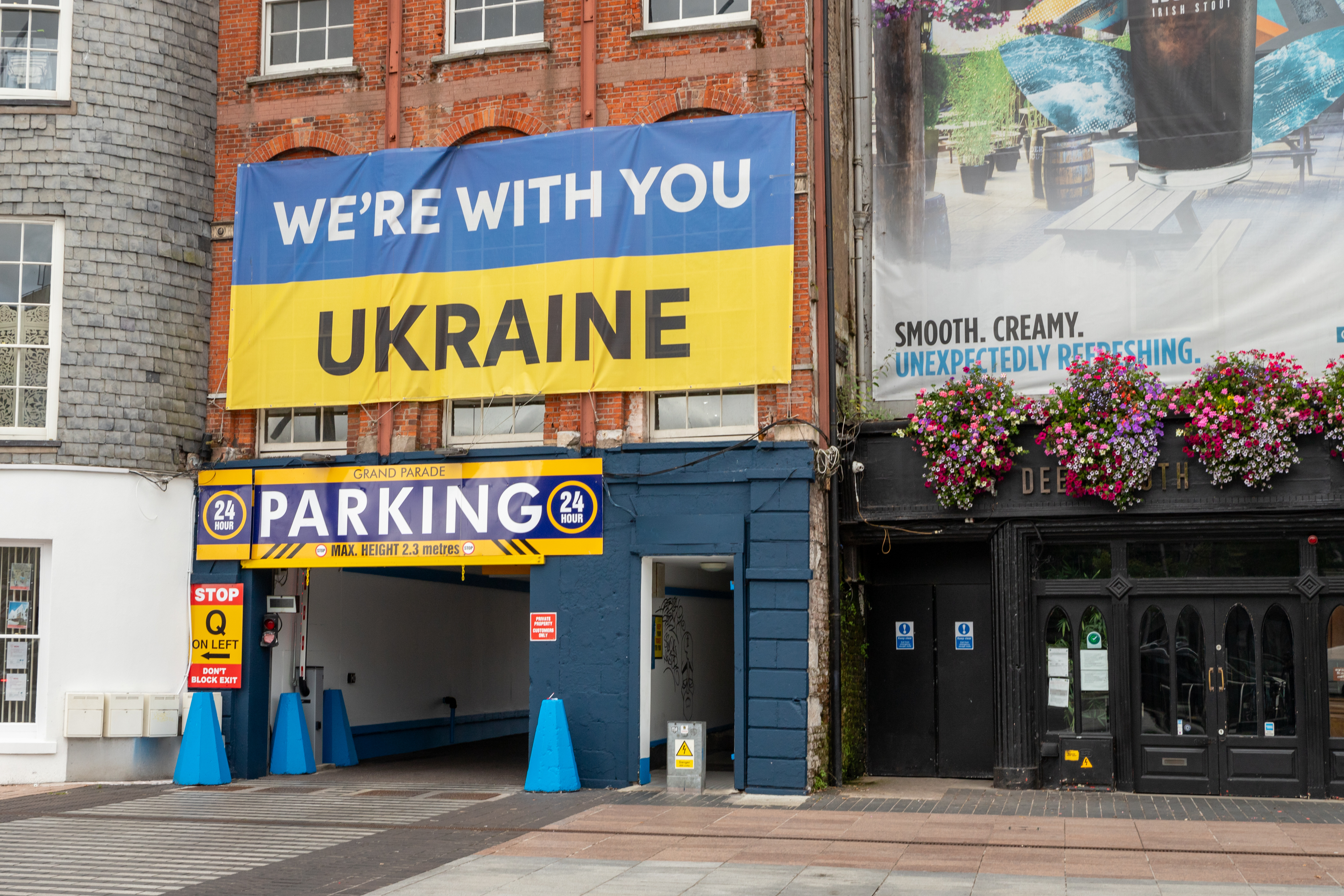
Banner in support of Ukraine, Cork

According to opinion polls of Irish citizens held in 2022:

- 89% of Irish respondents blamed Russia for the War in Ukraine; 5% blamed Ukraine (Red C poll)
- 72% agreed that Ireland "must continue to stand by Ukraine even if this means energy shortages"; 20% disagreed (Irish Times/Ipsos poll)
- 64% wanted more support for Ukraine (Ipsos B&A poll)

According to the May 2024 Eurobarometer poll of Irish citizens:

- 85% of Irish respondents supported Ireland taking in Ukrainian refugees
- 84% supported sanctions against Russia for its invasion of Ukraine
- 68% supported sending military equipment to Ukraine
- 74% supported granting EU candidate status to Ukraine

== See also ==
- Foreign relations of Ireland
- Foreign relations of Ukraine
- Ukraine-EU relations
  - Accession of Ukraine to the EU
