= Nikolai Kozyrev =

Nikolai Kozyrev may refer to:

- Nikolai Aleksandrovich Kozyrev (1908–1983), Soviet astronomer and astrophysicist
- Nikolai Kozyrev (diplomat) (1934–2021), Soviet and Russian diplomat
