= National Federation of Fishermen's Organisations =

The National Federation of Fishermen's Organisations (NFFO) is a main British trade organisation representing British fishermen, in relation to European fishing regulations.

== History ==
It was founded in 1977, in relation to new European regulations which were enacted in 1983.

The organisation was incorporated in June 2008.

== Structure ==
It is headquartered in central York.

=== Training ===
A division of the organisation provides training for British fishermen.

== See also ==
- European Fisheries Alliance (set up in 2017 to represent EU fishermen)
- Federation of Irish Fishermen
- Fishing industry in England
- Fishing industry in Scotland
