= KFO =

- ISO 639:kfo
- Kanojo ga Flag o Oraretara
- Killybegs Fishermen's Organisation (one of the three which form the Federation of Irish Fishermen)
- Knight of the Royal Order of Francis I
- Kukla, Fran and Ollie
- Royal Stockholm Philharmonic Orchestra (Swedish: Kungliga Filharmoniska Orkestern)
- Kfo, Korean League of Legends player
