= Embassy of Russia, Dublin =

Embassy of Russia in Ireland
- Address: 184-186 Orwell Road; Rathgar; Dublin 14; D14 X6R3; County Dublin
- Coordinates: 53.30301°N 6.26043°W
- Ambassador: Yuri Filatov
- Website: https://ireland.mid.ru/

The Embassy of Russia in Dublin is the diplomatic mission of the Russian Federation to Ireland. The embassy is on a 5.5 acres (2.2 ha) site on Orwell Road. Despite the small number of Russians in Ireland, Russia has the third-largest embassy staff in the country. Irish security sources believe the GRU and SVR operate out of the embassy, and it is regarded as a hub for Russian intelligence-gathering and influence operations in western Europe.

== Soviet era ==
In 1973 the government of Ireland decided to open diplomatic relations with the Soviet Union despite the objections of then Defence Minister Paddy Donegan, who was concerned that many embassy staff could be spies.

In 1983 three Soviet diplomats were expelled from Ireland. Taoiseach Garret FitzGerald asked Minister of State at the Department of Foreign Affairs Jim O'Keeffe to tell the three diplomats - Guennadi Saline (First secretary of the Soviet Embassy in Dublin), Viktor Lipassov and his wife Evdokia - that they had to leave. Speculation in Irish media at the time was that it was connected to the IRA, but years later it was revealed that it concerned attempts to gather information on United States military via a double agent met in the Stillorgan Shopping Center.

== Putin era ==
In February 2011, for the first time since 1983, the Irish government expelled a Russian diplomat based in Dublin after an investigation by the Garda Special Detective Unit which found that the identities of six Irish citizens had been stolen and used as cover for Russian spies found to have been working in the United States.

=== Planned expansion ===
In 2015, the Russian embassy requested and was granted planning permission from Dún Laoghaire–Rathdown County Council to make the embassy four times bigger.

In March 2020 then Minister for Housing, Eoghan Murphy, was summoned to a top secret meeting with senior defence and security officials. A closer look at the plans had raised concern. The embassy had applied to build an underground car park and a large underground complex, marked for storage and plant use, despite there being "plenty of room" to build above ground. The underground complex was to include twenty store rooms, thirteen toilets, ten power plant rooms, and four rooms with no description. Security sources warned that this could be used by Russian military intelligence and was ideal for storing computer servers for use in data mining, troll farming and launching online "influence" operations. Murphy signed an order to revoke part of the planning permission, on grounds that it could threaten national security.

=== Russian invasion of Ukraine ===
There was controversy in January 2022, when Russia announced plans to hold naval drills about 150 nautical miles off the coast of County Cork, within Ireland's exclusive economic zone. It was to involve naval artillery and missiles. Local fishermen protested to the Russian embassy that the drills could wipe out their catches and announced they would continue to fish in the area regardless. Russia's Ambassador to Ireland, Yury Filatov, warned the fishermen to "refrain from any provocative actions which might endanger all involved". Russia eventually agreed to move the drills further away from the coast.

After Russia invaded Ukraine on 24 February 2022, hundreds of people protested outside the embassy. One protester threw red paint over the Russian coat of arms. On 7 March 2022, a protester rammed a truck through the embassy gates. The embassy claimed that Gardaí did nothing to stop the truck, calling the incident a "blatant violation" of international diplomatic law and demanding that the Irish state ensure the safety of its staff. The truck driver was arrested, and Gardaí were forced to put up barriers around the building.

The Irish government expelled four Russian diplomats in March 2022 because their activities were "not in accordance with the international standards of diplomatic behaviour". They would be considered persona non grata, have their credentials withdrawn and be given a set number of days to leave. The diplomats were expelled under the 1961 Vienna Convention. They had been identified as likely being engaged in espionage. It was also highlighted that Russia had an unusually high number of diplomats working out of its Dublin embassy, which had long been seen as a hub for Russian intelligence in western Europe. The ambassador was not one of those expelled.

Shortly after, Russia expelled two Irish diplomats from Moscow in retaliation. The Irish foreign ministry said there was "no justification" to expel them.

An Irish volunteer, Finbar Cafferkey, was killed fighting for Ukraine against the Russian invasion in April 2023. Expressions of sympathy from the Irish government were criticised by the Russian embassy, which warned that Ireland could be deemed a belligerent in the conflict for such statements. The embassy's statement was condemned by Irish politicians across the political spectrum.

== Staff ==
At the beginning of 2020 there were a total of 30 officers at the Embassy, 14 diplomats and 16 Administrative and Technical staff. This made it among the most staffed Russian embassies, second only to the US. It was reduced to 21 officers (14 diplomats and 16 administrative and technical staff) following the invasion of Ukraine.

== See also ==
- Ireland–Russia relations
- List of ambassadors of Russia to Ireland
