= 2022 Russian military exercise in the Irish EEZ controversy =

Russian military exercises in Atlantic SW of Ireland

The 2022 Russian military exercise controversy concerns proposed military exercises in the Atlantic Ocean southwest of Ireland in international waters but within Ireland's exclusive economic zone from 3 to 8 February 2022. The exercise was to involve both the Russian Navy and Russian air force. The planned exercises were later cancelled by Russia at the request of the Irish government.

== Background ==
By 22 January, the Irish government received a warning that the Russian military was conducting an exercise or range practice in international waters off the Irish coast in the first week of February 2022. The Irish Aviation Authority announced that it was to reroute flights and issue a NOTAM. The area in question is approximately 240 km off the Irish coast.

TASS had announced that military exercises would run from the end of January to end in February off the Russian coast, also in the Mediterranean Sea, North Sea, Sea of Okhotsk, Atlantic and Pacific.

The Russian Embassy described reports of missile testing as "fake news" but didn't expand on the remark.

The controversy took place during the prelude to the Russian invasion of Ukraine and an alleged Russian cyberattack on critical Norwegian infrastructure.

== Irish reactions ==
A spokesperson for the Department of Foreign Affairs said that the department was aware of the exercises and had raised "concerns" with Moscow.

Simon Coveney, who is both Minister for Foreign Affairs and Minister for Defence, told the Russian ambassador that the exercises were allowed but the timing and location is "not wanted".

Cathal Berry, a TD for Kildare South, told the Dáil that the exercise was a potential threat to Irish sovereignty and that the armed forces had been underresourced.

Sorca Clarke, Sinn Féin spokesperson for defence and a TD for Longford–Westmeath said she was "deeply concerned" by the exercises. She also criticised the lack of sufficient radar and lack of funding for defence forces.

=== Fishermens' protests ===
Pat Murphy, CEO of the Irish South and West Fish Producers Organisation (IS&WFPO), said that some members planned to peacefully disrupt the exercises. He spoke with a Russian official who said it would be "reckless" for them to send boats. Murphy said that he assured the official that the boats would not be engaging with Russian vessels but that they would be fishing in their traditional areas and if this had an impact on the exercise it would be considered a peaceful protest. He said that after a second telephone conversation with the embassy he had been advised that the embassy was to notify the Irish government on 27 January that the exercises were going ahead and that it was the duty of the Irish government to keep Irish fishing boats out of the specified area. Murphy said the organisation was appalled at this.

On 27 January 2022, representatives of the IS&WFPO met with ambassador Yuri Filatov to express concerns about the impact of the exercises on the fishing grounds. Up to 60 vessels are expected to take part in the protest. After the meeting the representatives said that a "buffer zone" between the fishing grounds and the area the exercise was taking place in had been agreed.

The following day the Russian embassy denied that any such agreement had been made and the fishermen should "refrain from any provocative actions".

== International reactions ==
French ambassador Vincent Guérend said the exercise was "unhelpful, not welcome" and offered French support to Ireland.

== Announcement of relocation of exercises ==
On 29 January 2022, Simon Coveney announced in a tweet that he had received a response from the Russian Minister of Defence agreeing to his request that the exercises would be moved outside Ireland's EEZ.

== Events at sea ==
=== 24 January ===
TASS announced that the Russian Navy corvettes Soobrazitelny and Stoikiy had left Kaliningrad to carry out "combat exercises".

=== 27 January ===
The Marshal Ustinov, Admiral Kasatonov and Vice-Admiral Kulakov are named as being involved.

=== 31 January ===
French Armed Forces announced that they were following the corvettes Soobrazitelny and Stoikiy as they passed through the English Channel. They then handed over observation duty to HMS Argyll of the Royal Navy and USS Roosevelt of the United States Navy.

The Irish Air Corps CASA/IPTN CN-235 was seen patrolling the areas where the Russian vessels are expected and a Pilatus PC-12 was seen at Cork Airport.

=== 2 February ===
The two corvettes were reported to be off the English and French coasts. The replenishment oiler Vyazma was reported to be off the English coast near Portsmouth and is thought to have been supplying the corvettes with fuel.

The Russian ambassador was expected to appear before the Oireachtas Foreign affairs committee.
