= List of ambassadors of Russia to Chile =

Ambassador of the Russian Federation to the Republic of Chile
- Embajada de la Federación de Rusia en la República de Chile
- Emblem of the Russian Foreign Ministry
- Incumbent; Vladimir Belinsky since 28 June 2024
- Ministry of Foreign Affairs; Embassy of Russia in Santiago
- Style: His Excellency; The Honourable
- Reports to: Minister of Foreign Affairs
- Seat: Santiago
- Appointer: President of Russia
- Term length: At the pleasure of the president
- Website: Embassy of Russia in Chile

The ambassador extraordinary and plenipotentiary of the Russian Federation to Chile is the official representative of the president and the government of the Russian Federation to the president and the government of Chile.

The Russian ambassador and his staff work at large in the Embassy of Russia in Santiago. The post of Russian ambassador to Chile is currently held by Vladimir Belinsky, incumbent since 28 June 2024.

== History of diplomatic relations ==
Diplomatic contacts between Chile and Russia date back to the early nineteenth century, during the Chilean War of Independence which began in 1810. Captain Otto von Kotzebue, then carrying out a circumnavigation of the world aboard the brig Rurik visited the port of Talcahuano and the city of Concepción in 1816. Baron Anatoly de Kister was assigned for a time as chargé d'affaires in 1895, with the first plenipotentiary envoy, Mavriky Prozor, appointed in 1909. Augusto Matte Pérez was in turn appointed by Chile as the representative to the Russian Empire. Relations at this time were by representatives with dual accreditation, and affairs with Chile were handled by the Russian ambassador to Brazil. With the February Revolution in Russia in 1917, diplomatic relations were maintained with the new Russian Provisional Government, but ended shortly after the October Revolution brought the Bolsheviks to power. Diplomatic relations would not be restored until late in the Second World War.

Relations between Chile and what was by now the Soviet Union were officially restored on 11 December 1944. A new ambassador, Dmitry Zhukov, was appointed on 5 September 1945, but the warmer relations were short-lived. The Radical Party of Chile had won the 1946 Chilean presidential election with the support of the Communist Party of Chile, bringing Gabriel González Videla to power as president of Chile. Relations between the parties soon soured. Videla moved to break off relations with the Soviet Union and the Warsaw Pact countries on 21 October 1947, and with the Law of Permanent Defense of Democracy, banned the Communist Party of Chile. Relations remained broken for nearly twenty years. Relations improved with the victory in the 1964 Chilean presidential election of reformist-minded Eduardo Frei Montalva, and diplomatic relations were restored on 24 October 1964. The embassy in Santiago was reopened, as was a cultural centre, and Nikolai Alekseyev was appointed as Soviet ambassador. Relations continued to be positive under Frei Montalva's successor, Salvador Allende, but Allende was overthrown in the 1973 Chilean coup d'état, bringing right-wing dictator Augusto Pinochet to power. The Soviet Union withdrew its representatives in protest, and relations were once more broken off.

Chile was ruled as a military dictatorship for the next decade and a half, with the military regime ending after the 1989 Chilean general election. Now restored to democracy, relations with the Soviet Union were restored on 11 March 1990. The dissolution of the Soviet Union occurred in 1991, and Chile recognised Russia as its successor state. Diplomatic representatives have continued to be exchanged between the two countries since then.

== List of representatives (1909–present) ==
=== Russian Empire to Chile (1909–1917) ===
Name	Title	Appointment	Termination	Notes
Mavriky Prozor	Envoy	22 January 1909	1909	Credentials presented on 22 January 1909; Concurrently representative to Brazil
Pyotr Maksimov	Envoy	1910	1915	Concurrently representative to Brazil
Aleksandr Shcherbatsky	Envoy	1916	1917	Concurrently representative to Brazil

=== Russian Provisional Government to Chile (1917) ===
Name	Title	Appointment	Termination	Notes
Aleksandr Shcherbatsky	Envoy	1917	26 November 1917	Concurrently representative to Brazil

=== Soviet Union to Chile (1945–1991) ===
Name	Title	Appointment	Termination	Notes
Dmitry Zhukov	Ambassador	5 September 1945	21 October 1947	Credentials presented on 26 April 1946
Diplomatic relations interrupted (1947 - 1964)
Aleksandr Anikin	Ambassador	29 January 1965	19 February 1968	Credentials presented on 5 March 1965
Nikolai Alekseyev	Ambassador	19 February 1968	28 March 1971	Credentials presented on 3 April 1968
Aleksandr Basov	Ambassador	28 March 1971	22 September 1973	Credentials presented on 15 June 1971
Military dictatorship - Diplomatic relations interrupted (1973 - 1990)
Yuri Pavlov	Ambassador	23 August 1990	October 1991	

=== Russian Federation to Chile (1992–present) ===
Name	Title	Appointment	Termination	Notes
Vitaly Churkin	Ambassador	27 March 1992	7 July 1992	Appointment rescinded before credentials presented
Vasily Gromov	Ambassador	13 August 1992	5 June 1996	
Aleksey Kvasov	Ambassador	5 June 1996	12 August 2000	
Vladimir Chkhikvadze	Ambassador	12 August 2000	29 March 2005	
Yury Filatov	Ambassador	3 June 2005	8 June 2011	
Mikhail Orlovets	Ambassador	26 July 2011	17 December 2015	
Vladimir Trukhanovsky	Ambassador	17 December 2015	5 October 2020	
Sergey Koshkin	Ambassador	5 October 2020	28 June 2024	
Vladimir Belinsky	Ambassador	28 June 2024		Credentials presented on 6 November 2024
