= Tomsk Artillery School =

Soviet military academy in Tomsk, Russia

- Томское артиллерийское училище
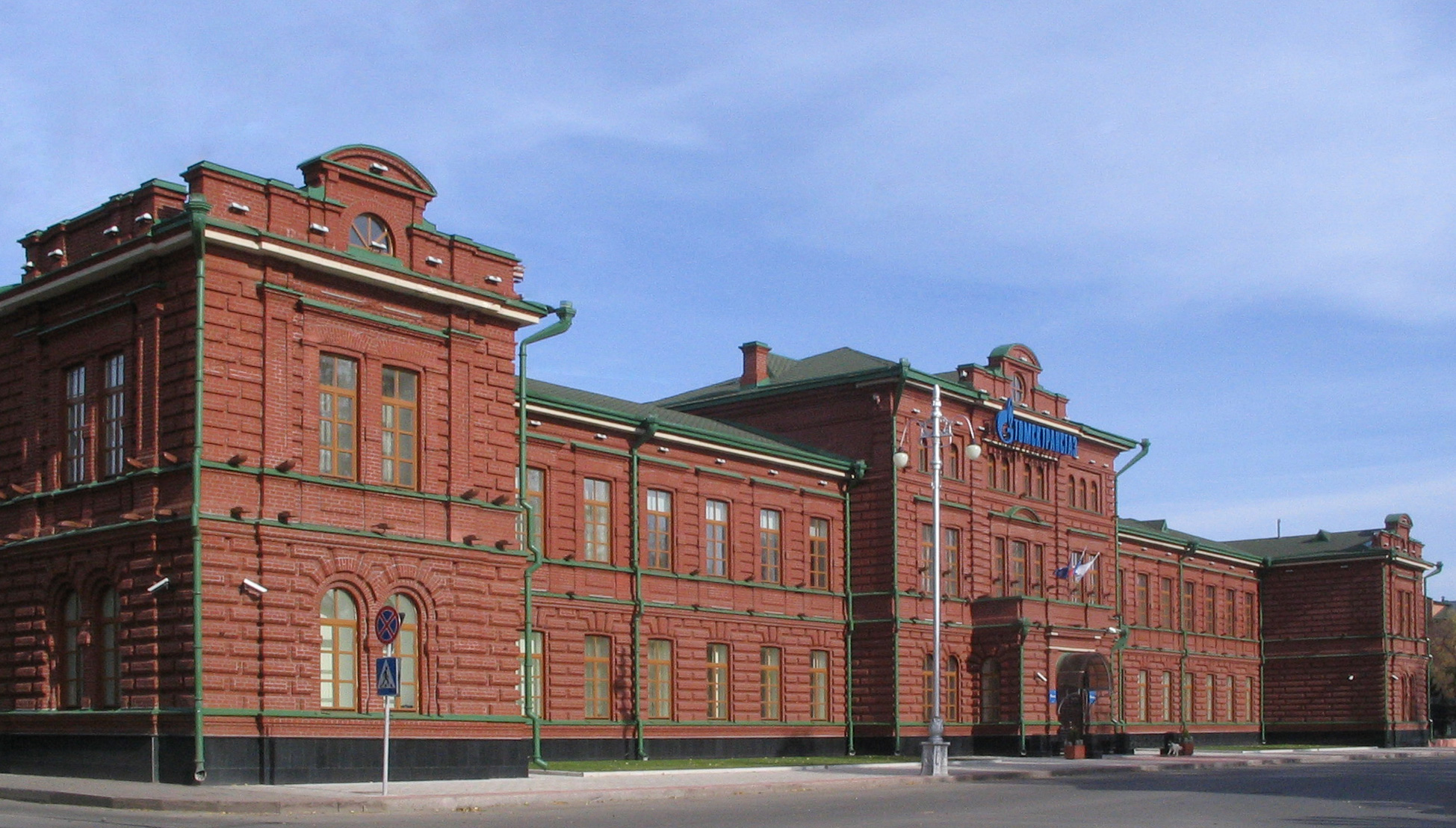
- Established: 1920
- Location: Tomsk, Russia
- Language: Russian

The Order of the Red Star Tomsk Artillery School (Russian: Томское артиллерийское училище) is a military educational institution founded on 3 January 1920, which trained officers for the Artillery Troops. It was disbanded on 23 August 1965 and the Tomsk Higher Military Command School of Communications was created on its basis.

== History ==
On 3 January 1920, Tomsk Artillery Command Courses were formed by Order No. 148 of the 5th Army. On July 13 of this year, the first graduation of artillery commanders for the Red Army took place. On 1 May 1921, by order of the Revolutionary Military Council No. 2900, the 6th Tomsk Artillery School was created on the basis of the Tomsk artillery command courses with a three-year training period. On 15 September 1930, "for the training of artillery commanders" on behalf of the Central Executive Committee of the USSR, the school was awarded the revolutionary Red Banner.

On 1 April 1937, by order of the People's Commissar of Defense of the USSR, the Tomsk Artillery School was established on the basis of the 6th Tomsk Artillery School. In 1938, graduates of the school were participants in the Khasan battles, in 1939 - the battles at Khalkhin Gol and the Soviet-Finnish war, for this company the first graduates of the Heroes of the Soviet Union were M. P. Kuteinikov and I. F. Spiryakov. On 16 August 1941, by order of the commander of the Siberian Military District No. 0168, the Tomsk Artillery School was renamed the First Tomsk Artillery School.'

From 1941 to 1945, during the Great Patriotic War, the First Tomsk Artillery School trained commanders according to a reduced curriculum; during the war, twenty-nine graduates of artillery officers were sent from the school to the front. In addition to training, the teaching and cadet staff of the school fought on the fronts of the war. Since 1941, a large group of graduates of the school, of which several divisions consisted of the 24th Army, participated in the battle of Smolensk. Since September 1941, the 166th Rifle Division, the 289th Anti-tank Artillery Regiment of the 316th Rifle Division included teachers and cadets of the Tomsk Artillery School, who participated in the battle for Moscow as part of these troops. In 1942, the command staff for the 328th Tomsk Volunteer Artillery Regiment as part of the 150th Infantry Division was formed from the cadets and teachers. In 1942, in the battles for Perekopovka, a graduate of the school, I. Z. Shuklin, was awarded the title Hero of the Soviet Union. From 1943 to 1944, sixteen graduates of the school were awarded the title of Hero of the Soviet Union for their heroic deeds in the battles near Kursk, in the Donbass and during the crossing of the Dnieper. In 1945, five graduates of the school distinguished themselves in the battles for the liberation of Poland and the capture of Berlin: M. N. Gorsky, V. B. Mironov, V. Ya. Gorbachev, N. G. Fedorov and A. Afanasy Shilin, who was awarded this title for the second time. During the war, more than fifty-four graduates of the school were awarded the title of Hero of the Soviet Union. From 1941 to 1945, during the war, the school graduated 5810 graduates and made twenty-six graduations.

On 14 March 1945, by the Decree of the Presidium of the Supreme Soviet of the USSR, "in commemoration of the 25th anniversary of the school, for outstanding success in training artillery officers for the Red Army and military services to the Motherland," the First Tomsk Artillery School was awarded the Order of the Red Star. On September 4, 1947, by Order of the Minister of the Armed Forces of the USSR No. 059, the 1st Tomsk Artillery School of the Order of the Red Star was renamed the Tomsk Artillery School of the Order of the Red Star.

On 11 August 1949, by Directive of the General Staff of the Armed Forces of the USSR No. ORG / 10/110845, the Tomsk Order of the Red Star Artillery School was reorganized into the Tomsk Order of the Red Star Anti-Aircraft Artillery School, to train anti-aircraft artillery officers. On 8 December 1949, by Order of the Minister of the Armed Forces of the USSR No. 00248, the day of the creation of the Tomsk Artillery School was set - 14 March 1920. In October 1950, the first issue of anti-aircraft gunners officers was made. On August 4, 1958, by directive of the Commander-in-Chief of the Ground Forces of the USSR No. OShch / 5 / 268693, the school was reorganized into the Tomsk Order of the Red Star Command Military Anti-Aircraft Missile School, with a three-year training period. In 1960, the first issue of rocket officers was made. From 1920 to 1965, during the period of its existence, the school trained more than ten thousand artillery officers, of which 46 people were awarded the title Hero of the Soviet Union, and 67 people became generals, of which two people became artillery marshals P. N. Kuleshov and E V. Boychuk.

On 23 August 1965, by the Decree of the Council of Ministers of the USSR, the Tomsk Order of the Red Star Artillery School for the training of command and technical personnel of ground-based rocket artillery was reorganized and became part of the Tomsk Higher Military Command School of Communications, created on its basis, which by succession received the Order of the Red Star of the Artillery School.

== Institute Awards ==
- (UPVS USSR dated 14.03.1945)

== Chiefs ==
- Strandstrem, Vladimir Alexandrovich (1925-1933)
- Sergeev, Ivan Pavlovich (1933-1936)
- Starostin, Konstantin Ivanovich (1936-1942)
- Dulshchikov, Leonid Ivanovich (1942-1944)
- Ivanov, Vladimir Alexandrovich (1944-1947)
- Hero of the Soviet Union medal.png Tsivchinsky, Viktor Gavrilovich (1947-1949)
- Klochko, Alexander Danilovich (1949-1955)
- Mikitenko, Trofim Alexandrovich (1955-1958)
- Klochko, Alexander Danilovich (1958-1963)
- Babeshko, Alexander Alexandrovich (1963-1964)
- Mezentsev, Vasily Afanasevich (1963-1964)
- Kulev, Vasily Yakovlevich (1965)

== Notable teachers ==
- Tolstoy, Ivan Fedoseevich

== Literature ==
- Томское ордена Красной Звезды артиллерийское училище (1958—1965) / А. П. Герасимов, Томский государственный архитектурно-строительный университет; Томск: 2020. — 128 с. — ISBN 978-5-93057-920-8
- Краткий очерк истории Томского военного ордена Красной звезды училища связи. (1920—1970). - Томск : 1970. — 62 с.

== Sources ==
- "Историческая справка Томского артиллерийского училища". Центр документации новейшей истории Томской области.
- "История училища (14 марта 1920 — 31 марта 1999)".
- "100 лет ТАУ-ТВВКУС". Томская неделя. 20 October 2017.
