= Vladimir Rakhmanin =

Russian diplomat, politician (born 1958)

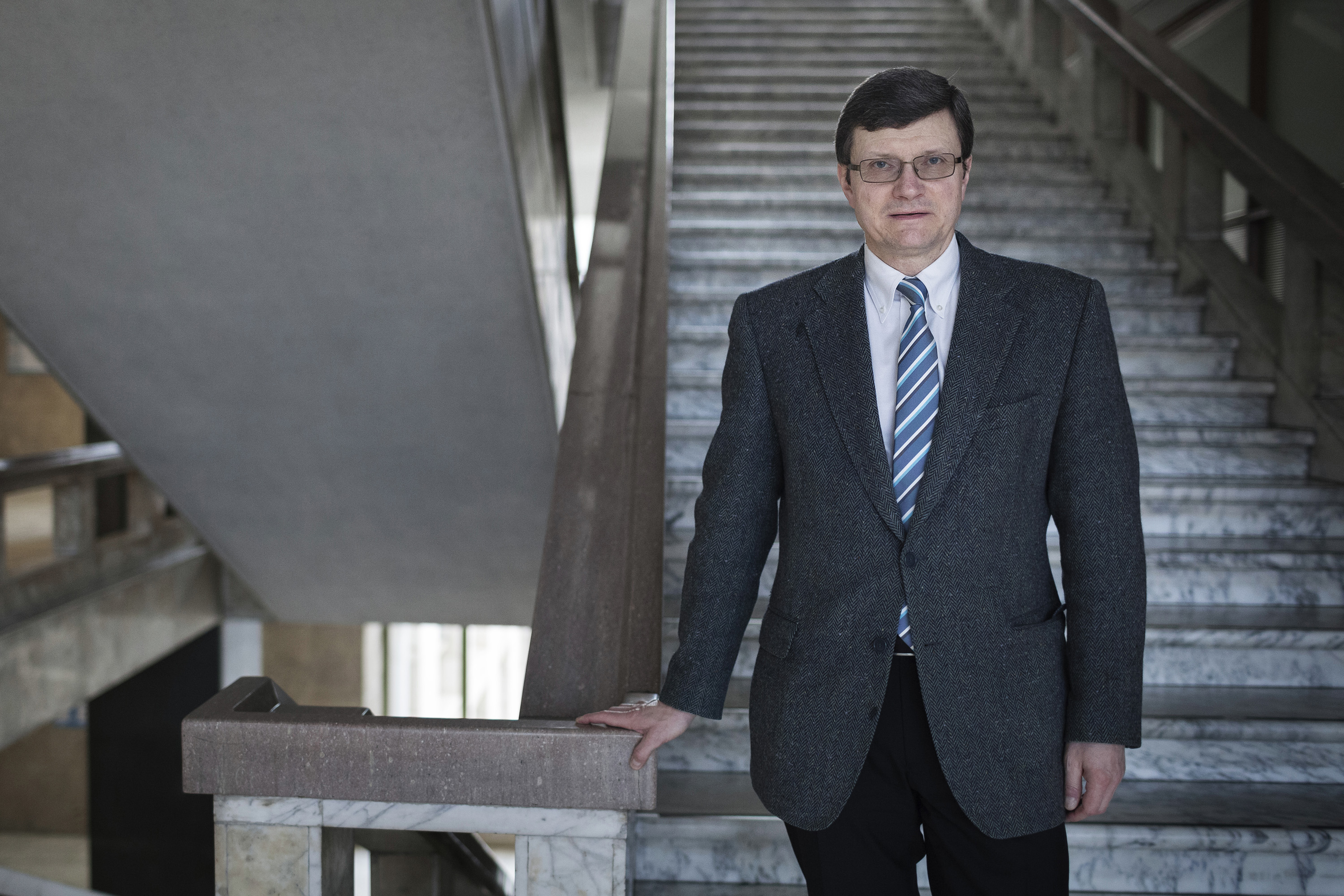
Vladimir Olegovich Rakhmanin, FAO’s Assistant Director-General and Regional Representative for Europe and Central Asia

Vladimir Olegovich Rakhmanin (born 24 May 1958) is a diplomat and an international civil servant.

Hebecame the Food and Agriculture Organization's Assistant Director-General and Regional Representative for Europe and Central Asia in January 2014. Rakhmanin completed a Master's diploma in international relations from Moscow State Institute of International Relations in 1980. Until July 2008 Rakhmanin had a distinguished career in the Russian civil service, including appointments as the Spokesman for the Ministry of Foreign Affairs (1998–2000), Chief of Protocol of the President of the Russian Federation (2000–2001), Ambassador of the Russian Federation to Ireland (2002–2006), and Ambassador at Large, chairing the Working Group on the Mechanism of Peace and Security in Northeast Asia of the Six-Party Talks on Denuclearisation of the Korean Peninsula.

He has the federal state civilian service rank of 1st class Active State Councillor of the Russian Federation.

After leaving civil service of the Russian Federation in July 2008 and starting his career as international civil servant, Rakhmanin served as Deputy Secretary General of the Energy Charter Secretariat in Brussels before joining FAO.

Rakhmanin speaks Russian, English and Chinese. He is married and has two sons and a daughter.
