= Air Finland =

Airline

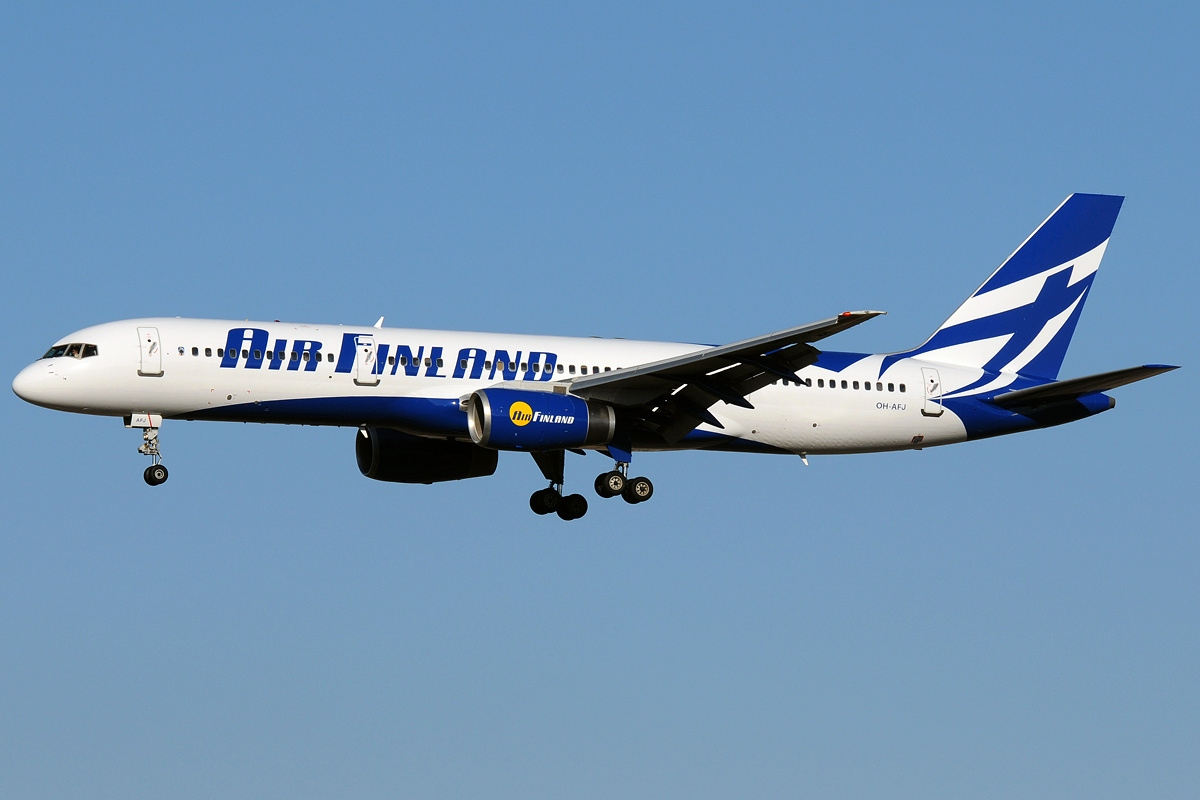
- Boeing 757-200
IATA	ICAO	Call sign
OF	FIF	AIR FINLAND
- Founded: January 2002
- Commenced operations: April 2003
- Ceased operations: June 26, 2012
- Operating bases: Helsinki Airport
- Destinations: 6 (scheduled)
- Headquarters: Vantaa, Finland
- Website: www.airfinland.fi

Oy Air Finland was an airline with headquarters and operational base at Helsinki Airport in Vantaa, Finland, which operated charter and scheduled flights to holiday destinations, as well as aircraft leasing services. The company was founded in 2002 and filed for bankruptcy in 2012.

== History ==
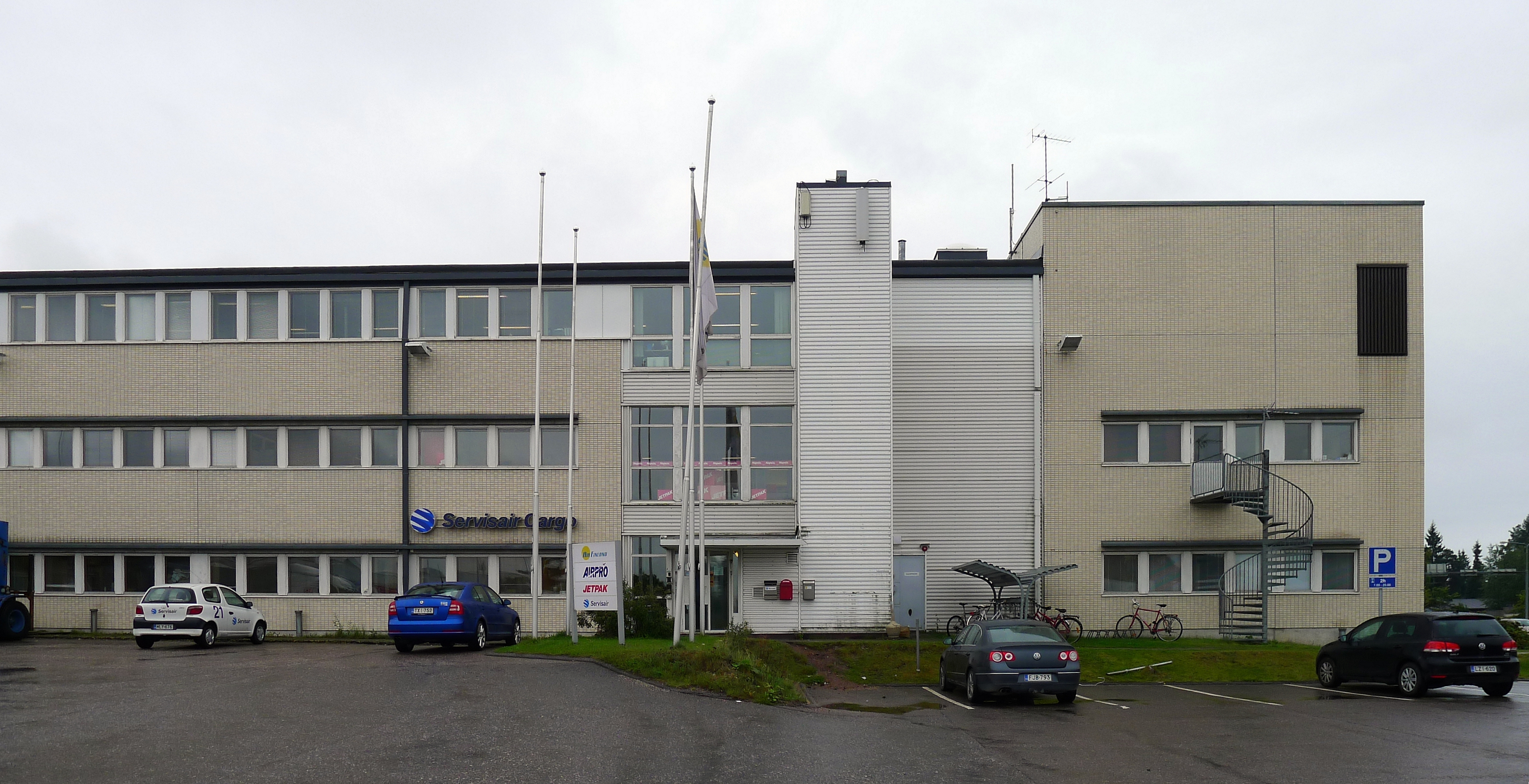
Air Finland headquarters

The airline was established in January 2002 and started flight operations on 3 April 2003. It was owned by three individuals from the aviation, finance and travel marketing industries: Harri Naivo (Chairman and Chief Financial Officer), Mika Helenius (Chief Executive Officer), and Lauri Komi. By March 2007, the company had 210 employees. On 26 June 2012, Air Finland announced that it would immediately cancel all flights and filed for bankruptcy.

== Destinations ==
As of March 2011, Air Finland operated scheduled flights to the following destinations. The broad range of charter flights offered by the airline is not included.

- Cyprus
  - Larnaca – Larnaca International Airport seasonal
- Finland
  - Helsinki – Helsinki Airport base
- Greece
  - Chania – Chania International Airport seasonal
  - Heraklion – Heraklion International Airport seasonal
  - Rhodes – Rhodes International Airport, "Diagoras" seasonal
- Spain
  - Alicante – Alicante Airport
  - Fuerteventura – Fuerteventura Airport seasonal
  - Gran Canaria – Gran Canaria Airport
  - Lanzarote – Lanzarote Airport seasonal
  - Málaga – Málaga Airport
  - Tenerife – Tenerife South Airport seasonal
- Turkey
  - Antalya – Antalya Airport seasonal
- United Arab Emirates
  - Dubai – Dubai International Airport seasonal
