= Finbar Cafferkey =

Irish political activist (died 2023)

- Born: 1977 or 1978; Achill Island, County Mayo, Ireland
- Died: 19 April 2023 (aged 45); Near Bakhmut, Donetsk Oblast, Ukraine
- Other names: Çîya Demhat (Kurdish nom-de-guerre); Heval Çîya
- Military career
- Allegiance: Ireland; Rojava; Ukraine
- Branch: Irish Army Reserve; People's Defense Units; Territorial Defense Forces: International Legion of Territorial Defense of Ukraine
- Service years: 2017–2023
- Rank: Volunteer
- Conflicts: Rojava–Islamist conflict; Raqqa campaign; Russo-Ukrainian War; Russian invasion of Ukraine; Battle of Bakhmut †

Finbar Cafferkey (1977 or 1978 – 19 April 2023) was an Irish political activist and soldier. In the late 2000s and early 2010s Cafferkey was active in the Shell to Sea campaign, which campaigned against the construction of an oil pipeline in north-west County Mayo.

In 2017 Cafferkey was in Syria providing medical aid before he joined the People's Defense Units, an arm of the Syrian Democratic Forces aligned with Rojava, and fought against the Islamic State. In 2023 it emerged that Cafferkey had been in Ukraine, fighting alongside the Ukrainian International Legion against the Russian invasion. Cafferkey was killed 19 April 2023 near the city of Bakhmut in the Donetsk Oblast.

== Biography ==
Cafferkey was a native of Achill Island in County Mayo, Ireland. Politically, Cafferkey was an Irish Republican and socialist who was a part of the Shell to Sea campaign which occurred in the late 2000s and early 2010s. It campaigned against the building of an oil pipeline in north-west County Mayo.

After leaving College, Cafferkey was at one time a member of the Irish Army Reserve.

=== Greece and North Macedonia ===
In 2015 Cafferkey travelled to the Greek island of Kos, where he assisted refugees amidst the 2015 European migrant crisis. A journalist from the Irish Independent happened to be also there reporting and verified Cafferkey's presence, and reported that Cafferkey, alongside another Irishman, later went to the border of Greece and North Macedonia to continue his work.

=== Syria ===
Cafferkey arrived in Syria in the late spring of 2017. According to his own account, Cafferkey was embedded in a heavy weapons platoon five weeks after he arrived, and part of the fighting around the city of Raqqa, then the de facto capital of the Islamic State, as part of the overall Raqqa campaign (2016–2017). In June 2017, a video on YouTube emerged in which Cafferkey, referring to himself by a Kurdish nom-de-guerre "Çîya Demhat", is interviewed. As part of the video, Cafferkey discussed his motives for fighting:

I came here because I admire the struggle of the Kurdish people. I admire the People’s Protection Units and the way they go about their fight. There are many similarities between the Irish and the Kurdish struggles. I have long admired the Kurdish people for standing up for themselves and I hope to help them do that. That is why I came. I see many parallels between the Kurdish struggle and the struggle in Ireland. Both are small countries who have fought against powerful enemies, very powerful enemies. Kurdistan is divided amongst four states all of whom are powerful, all of whom have treated the Kurdish people abominably. Between the [People's Defense Units] and the IRA, there are also many parallels, they have carried out a struggle against powerful enemies, and that's one of the reason I admire them, and one of the reasons I came here.

— Finbar Cafferkey speaking in 2017

=== Ukraine ===
Precisely when Cafferkey went to Ukraine is not publicly known, as he never publicised the fact nor told anyone outside his family. The Irish Times has stated that Cafferkey had been in Ukraine for roughly a year before his death, and that he had been working mainly with anarchist-aligned aid groups. Solidarity Collectives, a Ukrainian left-wing anti-authoritarian network, reported that he was delivering humanitarian aid and cars for frontline zones from Poland to Ukraine.

Cafferkey's presence in Ukraine only became public knowledge following his death, when it was confirmed he had been killed fighting near Bakhmut, Donetsk Oblast. Some reports have indicated that Cafferkey died fighting alongside Russian anarchist Dmitry Petrov (a founder of the Combat Organization of Anarcho-Communists) and US citizen Andrew "Harris" Cooper (a former US Marine and left-wing organiser), in a battle for a vital supply road near Bakhmut.

They were killed while fighting as part of the Bratstvo Battalion which is affiliated with the far-right political party Bratstvo. An associate who survived the battle told The Irish Times that this was a pragmatic arrangement for training purposes and not due to sympathy with the unit's political views.

==== Tributes ====
Following his death, many tributes were made across the political spectrum to Cafferkey. Amongst those tributes were some from Tánaiste and Minister for both Foreign Affairs and Defence Micheál Martin, who stated "My deepest sympathies to the Cafferky family on the sad passing of Finbar. He obviously was a young man of clear principles. Our thoughts and our prayers are with the family today".

In 2024 he was the subject of the documentary "Caillte san Úcráin", an episode of the TG4 documentary series Iniúchadh.

===== Statement by the Russian embassy in Dublin =====
Following Martin's tribute to Cafferkey, the Embassy of Russia, Dublin issued the following statement:

We have noted that on 28 April [the] Tánaiste has expressed his sympathies to the family of Finbar Cafferkey following reports of his death fighting presumably with the Ukrainian military against Russian armed forces. Mr. Martin called him "obviously a young man of clear principles". Every loss of life is sad and regretful. We do not know who Finbar Cafferkey was, except that for whatever reason he was fighting in a foreign land. We do not know what his principles were. What we do know, though, is that in a very big way it is the Irish Government and media to[o] who bear responsibility for the death of Finbar Cafferkey. It has been the Government and media who have been promoting anti-Russian propaganda, distorting the truth about the conflict in Ukraine, misleading people like Finbar Cafferkey. Now they face the results of their own efforts. We also do not know if Mr. Martin’s remarks signify support for the Irish to take part in combat in Ukraine, but we do know that if that is the case, then Ireland would be the direct participant of the conflict with all the ensuing consequences.

There was widespread disgust at the Russian statement, with the chairman of the Dáil Committee on Foreign Affairs and Defence Charles Flanagan immediately describing it as "threatening, intimidating and chilling" before suggesting Russian diplomats in Ireland should be expelled for such remarks. Sinn Féin TD Louise O'Reilly called the Russian statement "vile" while Independent TD Thomas Pringle described the statement was "an absolute disgrace". Members of People Before Profit Bríd Smith and Paul Murphy, who had both met Cafferkey via the Shell to Sea campaign, also expressed revulsion at the Russian statement but called for Irish politicians not to be baited by Russian rhetoric.

In response to the Russian statement, Finbar's brother Colm issued a statement:

My brother Finbar has always been fair-minded, strong-willed, and unafraid. He stood against all forms of imperialism, be it US, British, or Russian, and was strongly opposed to Ireland's support of US troops and any moves toward joining NATO. He was in Ukraine to help the Ukrainian people, as he would have helped any person in the world who was under attack. I loved him and always admired his clear-eyed bravery.
