= Nikolai Kozyrev (diplomat) =

Russian diplomat (1934–2021)

- Николай Козырев

Ambassador of the USSR/Russia to Ireland
- In office 16 October 1991 – 6 April 1998
- Preceded by: German Gventsadze
- Succeeded by: Yevgeny Mikhailov

Personal details
- Born: Nikolai Ivanovich Kozyrev; 27 June 1934 Moscow, Russian SFSR, Soviet Union
- Died: 11 September 2021 (aged 87)
- Education: Moscow State Institute of International Relations

Nikolai Ivanovich Kozyrev (Russian: Николай Иванович Козырев; 27 June 1934 – 11 September 2021) was a Soviet and Russian diplomat. He served as a member of diplomatic staff from the 1950s and into the 1990s, and as the Soviet and later Russian ambassador to Ireland from 1991 until 1998.

== Early life and postings ==
Kozyrev was born in Moscow. He studied at Moscow State Institute of International Relations, graduating in 1958 and joining the USSR's Ministry of Foreign Affairs that year. He was assigned to the Soviet embassy in Tehran in 1959, working as a translator and attaché until 1963. He was then recalled to work in the ministry's central apparatus, before being appointed third, then second secretary at the embassy in Iran, remaining there until 1968. Returning to the Soviet Union for another period of work and study in the ministry, he graduated from the Higher Diplomatic School of the Soviet Ministry of Foreign Affairs in 1970 as a specialist in the international relations of Eastern countries.

Kozyrev returned to Tehran in 1972, this time as the embassy's first secretary, a post he held until 1976. Once more recalled to the ministry's offices, he served as counselor and head of sector in the ministry's Department of the Middle East until 1979. He was then counselor at the Tehran embassy from 1979 until 1983, and the following year became minister-counselor at the Soviet embassy in Afghanistan until 1987. He was a member of the Soviet delegation to the Geneva talks on Afghanistan during the late 1980s, and contributed to the signing of the settlement agreements on 14 April 1988. He authored a number of articles and monographs on Afghan and Iranian topics. From 1987 until 1991 he served as ambassador-at-large at the Foreign Ministry.

== Ambassadorship and later life ==
On 16 October 1991, he was advanced to the rank of Ambassador Extraordinary and Plenipotentiary and was appointed the Soviet ambassador to Ireland that same day. With the dissolution of the Soviet Union later that year, he was formally confirmed in post as ambassador of Russia on 10 February 1992, as the Soviet Union's legal successor, until his recall on 6 April 1998. Retiring that year, he joined the Diplomatic Academy of the Ministry of Foreign Affairs of Russia as Vice-Rector for Personnel, later becoming an advisor at the academy's Centre for Eurasian Studies of the Institute of Contemporary International Problems. He also taught in the academy's Department of Russian Diplomacy and Foreign Policy, where he was known as a prominent expert on Iran and Afghanistan, and was an Honorary Professor of the Diplomatic Academy.

== Awards ==
Over the course of his career Kozyrev was awarded the Order of the Red Banner of Labour, the Certificate of Honour of the Presidium of the Supreme Soviet of the RSFSR, and the title of Honoured Worker of the Ministry of Foreign Affairs of Russia.

== Personal life ==
He was married, with a daughter.

== Death ==
Kozyrev died on 11 September 2021, at the age of 87. The Russian Ministry of Foreign Affairs announced that he was "a mentor for a whole generation of diplomat-orientalists, with whom he was always ready to share his extensive knowledge and rich professional experience." He was married, with a daughter.
