= List of ambassadors of Russia to Ireland =

Ambassador of the Russian Federation to Ireland
- Emblem of the Russian Foreign Ministry
- Incumbent; Yuri Filatov since 26 July 2017
- Ministry of Foreign Affairs; Embassy of Russia in Dublin
- Style: His Excellency
- Reports to: Minister of Foreign Affairs
- Seat: Dublin
- Appointer: President of Russia
- Term length: At the pleasure of the president
- Website: Embassy of Russia in Ireland

The ambassador extraordinary and plenipotentiary of the Russian Federation to Ireland is the official representative of the president and the government of the Russian Federation to the president and the government of Ireland.

The ambassador and his staff work at large in the Embassy of Russia in Dublin. The post of Russian ambassador to Ireland is currently held by Yuri Filatov, incumbent since 26 July 2017.

== History of diplomatic relations ==
Diplomatic relations between Ireland and the Soviet Union were established on 29 September 1973, with the publishing of a joint communiqué on the exchange of diplomatic missions. Both countries began to exchange ambassadors from 1973 onwards. With the dissolution of the Soviet Union in 1991, Ireland recognised the Russian Federation as its successor state. The incumbent Soviet ambassador, Nikolai Kozyrev, continued to serve as representative of Russia until 1998.

== List of representatives (1973–present) ==
=== Soviet Union to Ireland (1973–1991) ===
Name	Title	Appointment	Termination	Notes
Anatoly Kaplin	Ambassador	26 March 1974	3 August 1979	Presentation of credentials on 14 June 1974
Aleksei Nesterenko	Ambassador	31 March 1980	11 November 1986	Presentation of credentials on 11 June 1980
Gennady Uranov	Ambassador	11 November 1986	18 March 1991	
German Gventsadze	Ambassador	18 March 1991	16 October 1991	
Nikolai Kozyrev	Ambassador	16 October 1991	25 December 1991	

=== Russian Federation to Ireland (1991–present) ===
Name	Title	Appointment	Termination	Notes
Nikolai Kozyrev	Ambassador	25 December 1991	6 April 1998	
Yevgeny Mikhailov	Ambassador	6 April 1998	29 December 2001	
Vladimir Rakhmanin	Ambassador	29 December 2001	20 October 2006	
Mikhail Timoshkin	Ambassador	20 October 2006	22 May 2011	
Sergei Petrovich	Chargé d'affaires	22 May 2011	20 February 2012	
Maksim Peshkov	Ambassador	20 February 2012	26 July 2017	
Yuri Filatov	Ambassador	26 July 2017		
