= Fetus in fetu =

Fetus-like mass within the body of its host

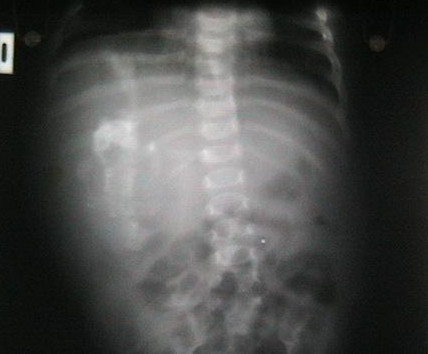
Anteroposterior abdominal radiograph shows a soft-tissue mass in the right hemiabdomen. The mass contains calcified osseous-appearing structures of varying sizes and shapes.

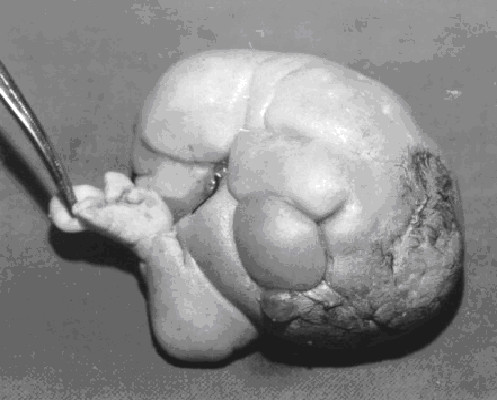
The postoperative specimen from the previous image shows a fairly well developed fetus lying on its back, with rudimentary digits.

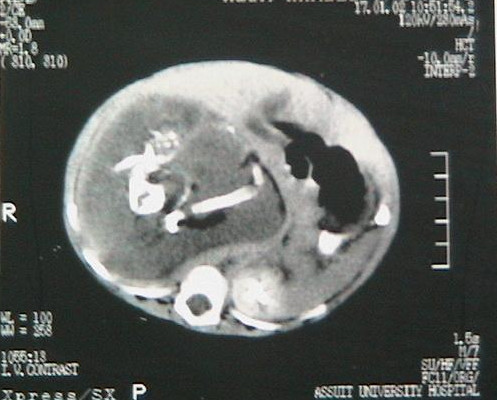
A computed tomography scan of the same patient's abdomen pre-operation reveals a large retroperitoneal soft-tissue mass. There are long hyperdense opacities that resemble fetal bones.

Fetus in fetu (or foetus in foetu) is a rare developmental abnormality in which a mass of tissue resembling a fetus forms inside the body of a true fetus. An early example of the phenomenon was described in 1808 by George William Young.

There are two hypotheses for the origin of a fetus in fetu. One hypothesis is that the mass begins as a normal fetus but becomes enveloped inside its twin. The other hypothesis is that the mass is a highly developed teratoma. Fetus in fetu is estimated to occur in 1 in 500,000 live births (0.0002%).

== Classification as life ==
A fetus in fetu can be considered alive, but only in the sense that its component tissues have not yet died or been eliminated. Thus, the life of a fetus in fetu is akin to that of a tumor in that its cells remain viable by way of normal metabolic activity. However, without the gestational conditions in utero with the amnion and placenta, a fetus in fetu can develop into, at best, an especially well differentiated teratoma; or, at worst, a high-grade metastatic teratocarcinoma. In terms of physical maturation, its organs have a working blood supply from the host, but all cases of fetus in fetu present critical defects, such as no functional brain, heart, lungs, gastrointestinal tract, or urinary tract. Accordingly, while a fetus in fetu can share select morphological features with a normal fetus, it has no prospect of any life outside of the host twin. Moreover, it poses clear threats to the life of the host twin on whom its own life depends.

== Hypotheses of development ==
There are two main hypotheses about the development of fetus in fetu.

=== Teratoma hypothesis ===
Fetus in fetu may be a very highly differentiated form of dermoid cyst, itself a highly differentiated form of mature teratoma.

=== Parasitic twin hypothesis ===
Fetus in fetu may be a parasitic twin fetus growing within its host twin. Very early in a monozygotic twin pregnancy, in which both fetuses share a common placenta, one fetus wraps around and envelops the other. The enveloped twin becomes a parasite, in that its survival depends on the survival of the host twin, by drawing on the host twin's blood supply. The parasitic twin is anencephalic (without a brain) and lacks some internal organs, and as such is unable to survive on its own.

== Case studies ==
=== Sanju Bhagat ===
Sanju Bhagat (b. 1963) is an Indian man who gained public attention after doctors discovered that his abdominal swelling, which was initially suspected to be a tumor, as fetus in fetu. In 1999, Sanju Bhagat sought medical treatment in Mumbai due to severe abdominal enlargement accompanied by breathing difficulties. However, during the surgical procedure, doctors identified the presence of a mass containing differentiated anatomical structures such as limbs, hair, and bone elements. In this case, the enclosed twin had remained undetected for several decades and had established a vascular connection with the host. Following surgical removal of the mass, Bhagat's symptoms subsided, and he recovered without complications.
