= Yury Anatoliyevich Filatov =

Russian ambassador to Ireland

Yury Filatov
- Юрий Филатов

Ambassador of Russia to Ireland
- Incumbent
- Assumed office 26 July 2017
- President: Vladimir Putin
- Preceded by: Maksim Peshkov

Director of the State Protocol Department of the Russian Ministry of Foreign Affairs
- In office 14 June 2011 – 2017
- Preceded by: Boris Marchuk
- Succeeded by: Igor Bogdashev

Ambassador of Russia to Chile
- In office 3 June 2005 – 8 June 2011
- Preceded by: Vladimir Chkhikvadze
- Succeeded by: Mikhail Orlovets

Personal details
- Born: 9 December 1957 (age 68)
- Education: Moscow State Institute of International Relations
- Awards: Order of Friendship; Medal of the Order "For Merit to the Fatherland" Second Class

Yury Anatoliyevich Filatov (Russian: Юрий Анатольевич Филатов; born 9 December 1957) is a Russian diplomat. He has served as the ambassador to Chile between 2005 and 2011, director of the State Protocol Department of the Russian Ministry of Foreign Affairs between 2011 and 2017, and as the incumbent Russian ambassador to Ireland since 2017.

== Early career ==
Filatov was born on 9 December 1957, and graduated from the Moscow State Institute of International Relations in 1979. His first assignment, from 1979 until 1981, was to the Soviet embassy in Washington. He returned there for a second posting between 1985 and 1989, and for a third time after the dissolution of the Soviet Union in 1991, between 1994 and 1999. He had by this time moved from working for the Soviet Ministry of Foreign Affairs to its Russian successor. He was deputy director of the Ministry of Foreign Affairs's North America Department between 2000 and 2002, and then Minister-Counselor of the Russian embassy in Canada from 2002 until 2005.

On 3 June 2005, Filatov was appointed ambassador of Russia to Chile, a post he held until 8 June 2011. On his return to Russia he became head of the ministry's State Protocol Department. He held this position until his appointment on 26 July 2017 to be ambassador to Ireland.

== Ambassador to Ireland ==
=== Skripal affair ===
As a result of the Skripal affair, Simon Coveney informed the ambassador that "the accreditation of a member of his staff with diplomatic status is to be terminated". The ambassador appeared on Claire Byrne Live and said that Ireland should put its own interests first, not those of another country and also said:

"The only thing I know for sure, from the onset of the whole incident on 4 March in Salisbury – the British Government has moved away from dealing with that in a responsible manner. So, they preferred to wage a propaganda campaign, unprecedented, surely."

=== 2022 Russian military exercise controversy ===
During the controversy Ambassador Filatov met with members of the Irish South and West Fish Producers Organisation.

=== Russo-Ukrainian crisis ===
On 2 February 2022, Mr Filatov explained to an Oireachtas committee that there was an "almost daily drumbeat of so-called imminent Russian invasion of Ukraine" and stated there were no facts to support the invasion "fantasy". He said "The most pressing issue facing Russia, Europe and beyond is the threat to Russian national security resulting from the eastward expansion of NATO" and this "is unacceptable behaviour and has to be dealt with".

In an interview on 16 February 2022 with Prime Time Mr Filatov believed the idea that Russia would invade Ukraine was "insane". He dismissed the suggestion that stationing Russian troops around borders with Ukraine was an act of aggression or that Russia planned on invading Ukraine at that time. He said "We do not have any political, economic, military or [any] other reason to do that. The whole idea is insane. If you knew something about the Russian and Ukrainian people you would never ask such a question". He said the troops would have returned to normal duties in about three to four weeks.

On 24 February 2022, Russia invaded Ukraine. On 25 February 2022 Mr Filatov was questioned during an interview by David McCullagh on RTÉ News: Six One TV show, in which he claimed that the war was started by the Ukrainian government.

On 29 March 2022 Mr Filatov was summoned to the Irish Department of Foreign Affairs and told of a decision to expel four senior diplomats from the Russian embassy, not including himself though. Mr Filatov did not object to this.

== Family and personal life ==
Filatov has held the diplomatic rank of Ambassador Extraordinary and Plenipotentiary since 2014. He was awarded the Order of Friendship in 2023, and the Medal of the Order "For Merit to the Fatherland" second class in 2013. In addition to his native Russian, Filatov speaks English and Spanish. He is widower, with a son and a daughter.
