= Federation of Irish Fishermen =

The Federation of Irish Fishermen (FIF) is the umbrella organization for the three main Fish Producing Organizations (FPOs) in Ireland. It consists of The Irish Fish Producers Organization Ltd (IFPO), The Irish South and West Fish Producers Organisation Ltd.(IS&WFPO), and The Killybegs Fishermen's Organisation Ltd (KFO). Currently, the FIF represents over 90% of the Irish fishing fleet.

The mission statement of the FIF is "to provide a unified voice for the Irish Fishing Industry and to provide an active input into all policy making decisions both nationally and internationally." The group participates in extensive lobbying on behalf of the livelihood of its members and their professions, as well as organizes demonstrations and other national events to benefit the national industry.

== History ==
The FIF was founded in 2006 in response to the ever waning fishing industry in Ireland due to imports of cheaper fish from elsewhere on the European continent. The establishment of the organization was a formalization of already tight coalitions between the smaller member organizations. It was initially chaired by the then CEO of The Irish Fish Producers Organization, Lorcán Ó Cinnéide.

== Leadership ==
The FIF's leadership structure is a Board of Chief Executives from the constituent organizations:

- Francis O'Donnell (CEO of The Irish Fish Producers Organization)
- Eibhlín O'Sullivan (CEO of The Irish South and West Fish Producers Organisation Ltd.)
- Seán O'Donoghue (CEO of The Killybegs Fishermen's Organization Ltd.)
- the remaining 6 Directors are made up of two representatives of the constituent organisations.

The position of Chairman of the Board changes each year, rotating between the CEOs of the three constituent fish producing organizations. As of 1 January 2014 the position is held by Seán O'Donoghue of the KFO.

== Action ==
The FIF have been responsible for a number of demonstrations on behalf of the Irish Fishing Industry since its inception. Some of these actions include:

- 5 June 2008 - to protest the import of cheap fish from outside Ireland and the resulting low prices paid to domestic fishermen for their catch, FIF demonstrators blocked the cargo terminal at Cork Airport.
- 14 July 2008 - FIF representatives lobbied for the immediate implementation of an emergency economic aid package for the domestic fishing industry. The package was agreed on the next day during a meeting of EU Fisheries Ministers in Brussels on 15 July. The package was upwards of €600 million.
- 21 July 2008 – Coinciding with the visit of President Nicolas Sarkozy, and to protest the fact that Ireland has 23% of the fishing waters in Europe but is only allowed a 4% international trade quota, FIF demonstrators distributed surplus catch of 1.5 tons of free fish on the O'Connell Bridge. Over 200 fishermen from around the country took part. The protest moved on to Government Buildings later in the day, and was supported by MEP Kathy Sinnott, Sinn Féin TD Arthur Morgan, and former unsuccessful (Labour Party/Socialist Workers Party/Independent) election candidate and Gombeen man, Michael O'Sullivan.

== Treaty of Lisbon ==
The FIF claims to have played a vital role in the national veto of the Treaty of Lisbon, an EU document seeking to consolidate leadership and increase functionality of international trade within the EU. By Irish constitutional law, such a motion had to be voted on in a public referendum. The FIF took a strong stance against the treaty, claiming that its trade provisions for the fish market would be unhealthy for the already struggling Irish industry. A series of actions before and after the Lisbon vote on 12 June (to which the Irish delivered a very sound “no”) occurred, including fish dumps, harbor blocking, boat tie ups, and numerous other acts. However, when protocols were agreed with the other EU states, on issues such as neutrality, the Twenty-eighth Amendment of the Constitution of Ireland was passed by the people with a 67% majority.

== See also ==
- European Union
- Economy of the Republic of Ireland
