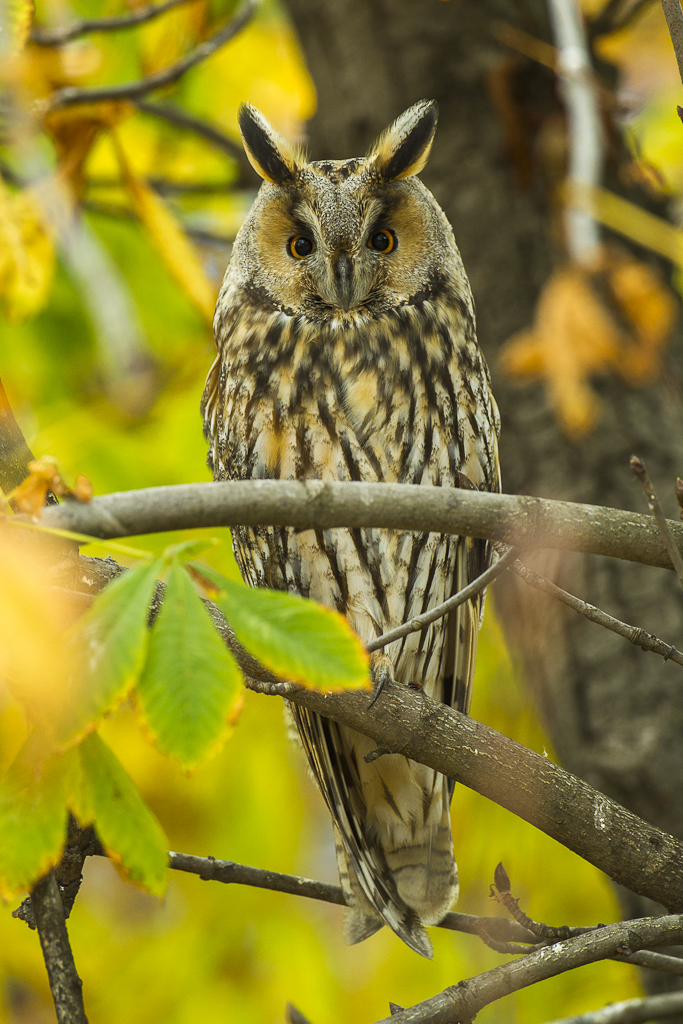
- A long-eared owl in Hungary

Conservation status
- Least Concern (IUCN 3.1)
- CITES Appendix II

Scientific classification
- Kingdom: Animalia
- Phylum: Chordata
- Class: Aves
- Order: Strigiformes
- Family: Strigidae
- Genus: Asio
- Species: A. otus

Binomial name
- Asio otus (Linnaeus, 1758)
- Range of A. otus Breeding Resident Non-breeding Extant (seasonality uncertain)

Synonyms
- Asio wilsonianus (Lesson, 1830); Otus wilsonianus Lesson, 1830; Strix otus Linnaeus, 1758

Audio
- Screams

= Long-eared owl =

Species of owl

The long-eared owl (Asio otus), also known as the northern long-eared owl or informally as the lesser horned owl or cat owl, is a medium-sized typical owl with an extensive range. The genus name, Asio, is Latin for "horned owl", and the specific epithet, otus, is derived from Greek and refers to a small eared owl. It breeds in Europe and the Palearctic, as well as in North America.

This owl prefers semi-open habitats, particularly woodland edge, as they to roost and nest within dense stands of wood but prefer to hunt over open ground. The long-eared owl primarily hunts small rodents, especially voles, but during population cycles of their regular prey, or in arid, insular, or urbanized habitats, it takes diverse prey including birds and insects. The long-eared owl utilizes nests built by other animals, in particular by corvids. Breeding success in this species is correlated with prey populations and predation risks. Unlike many owls, long-eared owls are not strongly territorial or sedentary. They are partially migratory or nomadic. Another characteristic of this species is its partiality for regular roosts shared by a number of long-eared owls at once. The long-eared owl is one of the most widely distributed and most numerous owl species in the world, and due to its very broad range and numbers it is considered a least concern species by the IUCN. Nonetheless, strong declines have been detected for this owl in several parts of its range.

== Taxonomy ==
The long-eared owl was described by Linnaeus in 1758 in the tenth edition of Systema Naturae under the binomial name Strix otus. It is now assigned to the genus Asio that was introduced by Mathurin Jacques Brisson in 1760.

There are eight known species worldwide in the genus Asio, also referred to as eared owls. Despite similarities and being considered as in the same genus, it was found in a study utilizing electrophoresis that the genetic distance between long-eared owls and short-eared owls was unusually large for species within the same genera. Notwithstanding fossil records of Asio species showing their presence during prehistory in locations like Kansas and Idaho (Asio brevipes) and California (Asio priscus), the exact area of evolutionary origin of the long-eared owl is unknown and unlikely to ever be known. At least three modern species represent related derivations, possibly with long-eared owls as the paraspecies or as part of a species complex that potentially bears a basal common ancestor. In all three cases, the related owls are obviously more tropical in distribution and adapted to more humid conditions, with darker plumage, and larger bodies with apparently stronger feet and more overdeveloped talons, possibly exploiting a relatively unoccupied ecological niche against competing owls. One of these three is the Stygian owl, which is the darkest derivation of all and readily known to be distinct for some time. The other two slightly larger, tropical species, possibly housed in a species complex with the long-eared owl, were at one time considered to be part of the long-eared owl species. One of these is the Madagascar owl (Asio madagascariensis), obviously endemic to the island of its name, while the other is the Abyssinian owl (Asio abyssinicus), native to east Africa, especially in the northern area such as Ethiopia. While the marsh owl of Africa is outwardly very similar to and likely closely related to the short-eared owl, the striped owl (Asio clamator) is somewhat of an outlier among living Asio species and of mysterious origin. Despite being genetically related to the other living Asio species, it does not appear to be a close cousin. Studies of the mitochondrial genome found that the Asio genus, and consequently the long-eared owl, diverged most recently among living owl groups from the Otus or scops owl genus, with a more distant branch division from the Strix genus. A study of the genetic homogeny of long-eared owls in a single roost site was shown to be slightly higher than between different roosts. However, this homogeny is relatively low for a communal roosting bird in general.

=== Subspecies ===
Four subspecies of the long-eared owl are recognised:

- A. o. otus (Linnaeus, 1758) – This is the nominate subspecies and is distributed throughout the species' range in the Palearctic. It may be found as far west as the Azores, northwestern Africa, the Iberian Peninsula and the British Isles through as far east as Sakhalin, Japan and northern China. Some populations of this race may winter as far south as Egypt, Pakistan, northern India and southern China. The wing chord of the nominate subspecies ranges between 263 and 313 mm (10.4 and 12.3 in) and the tail length may be between 132 and 165 mm (5.2 and 6.5 in). Size appears to increase slightly from west to east, with owls in China being about 4% larger winged than those from Europe. Despite there being no known published weights for eastern/Chinese long-eared owls, they appear to obtain the largest sizes within the species. In this subspecies, the facial disc tends to be pale ochraceous tawny, rimmed black with relatively short eyebrows that are marked whitish or absent entirely of markings. The erectile ear-tufts are prominent, being colored mainly blackish-brown with tawny edges. The upperparts are ochraceous-tawny, finely peppered with dusky spots and blackish streaks on a grey "veil", while the crown is finely mottled to dusky. The nape and hindneck bear dusky shaft-streaks with the feather outer webs of the scapulars being whitish, forming a row across the shoulder. Primaries basally are uniformly ochraceous-tawny, distally barred light and dark, while the secondaries are barred ochraceous and dusky. The tail is typically tawny with a greyish wash, overlaid with 6-8 very narrow dark brown bars. The underparts have a base colour of ochre, with the foreneck and upper breast marked with blackish-brown streaks; these become paler below and marked with dusky shaft-streaks and narrow cross-bars. The underwing has distinctive barring and dark comma-like markings at the wrist (conspicuously lacking on overlapping Eurasian short-eared owls). The eyes tend to be yellowish-orange to orange, but occasionally may be chrome yellow. The cere is brownish-flesh, the bill is grey and the talons are blackish-grey. In this subspecies, the downy chick is whitish with pink skin, while the mesoptile plumage is fluffy greyish to brownish-white with diffusely barred dusky flight and tail feathers, being similar to adults but with the ear-tufts not yet developed.
- A. o. canariensis (Madarász, 1901) – This subspecies is endemic to the Canary Islands. With a wing chord measurement of 257 to 284 mm (10.1 to 11.2 in), this is seemingly the smallest subspecies of the long-eared owl. This race averages darker than most long-eared owls of the nominate subspecies, bearing heavier and sharper dark markings overall. Furthermore, the Canary Island long-eared owls tend to have brighter reddish-orange eyes.
- A. o. wilsonianus (Lesson, 1830) – This subspecies is found in south-central and southeastern Canada (Manitoba to Nova Scotia) to southern USA (north Oklahoma and Virginia). The wing chord typically measures 284 to 305 mm (11.2 to 12.0 in). In general, American long-eared owls are more vividly marked than many Eurasian populations. The facial disc is bright rufous, with a strong blackish rim and extensive white about the disc. The eyes are typically a deep yellow. Meanwhile, the markings on the underside usually are quite blackish and prominent with distinct cross-bars.
- A. o. tuftsi Godfrey, 1948 – The range is from western Canada (southern Yukon to southwest Manitoba) to south-central USA (west Texas). It differs from A. o. wilsonianus in having paler plumage. The brown mottling on upper parts is paler and more restricted. It is weakly differentiated and may comprise clinal variations due to region and habitat, rather than subspecific differences.

== Description ==
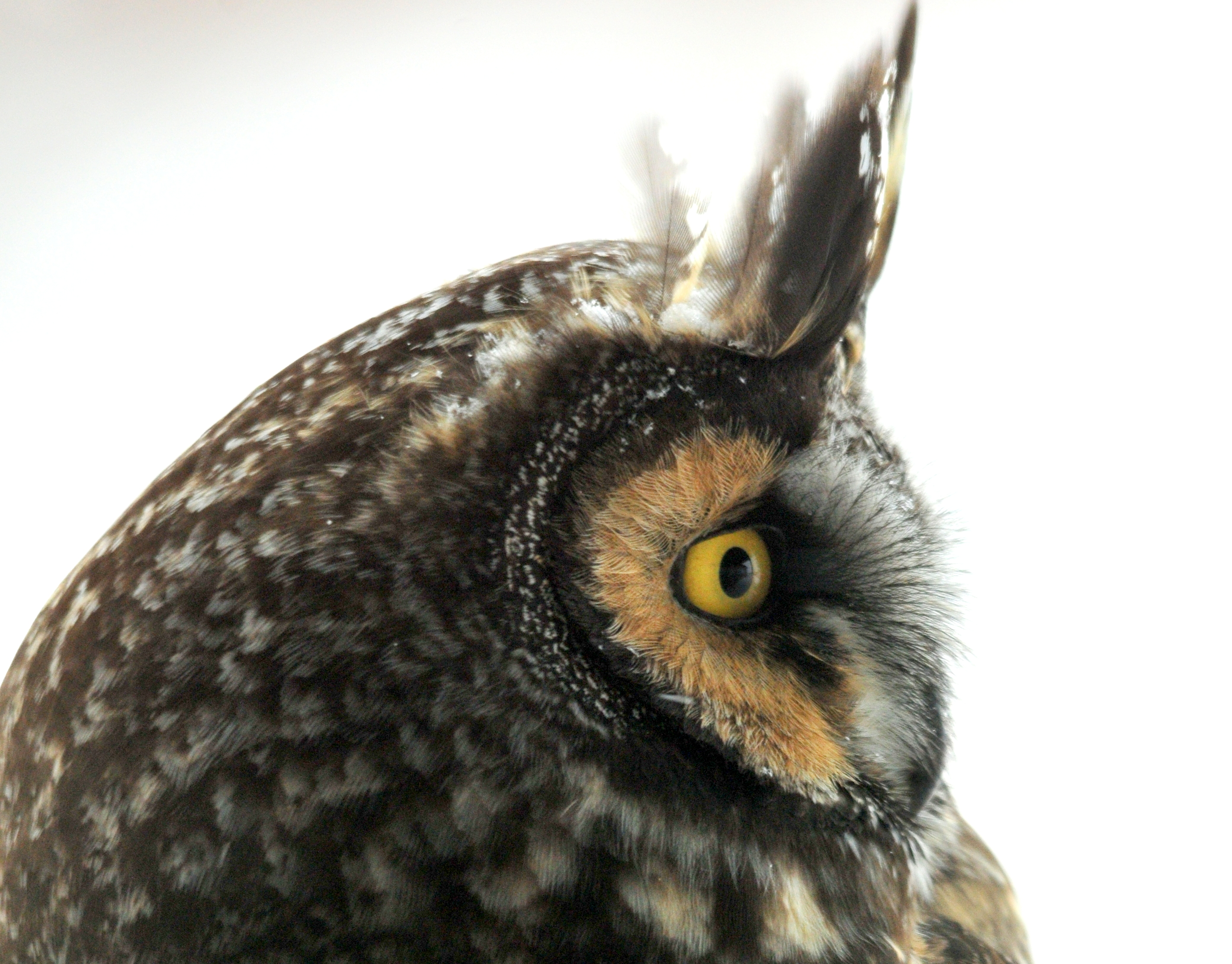
Long-eared owl at Seedskadee National Wildlife Refuge (Wyoming)

This species is a slim and long winged owl with erectile ear tufts, which are positioned closer to the center of the head than in many other types of owl. Ear tufts, present in about half of living owls, are conjectured to be a means of intraspecies communication of intent and mood.

In general coloration, the long-eared owl is a hue of ochraceous-tawny with a grayish or brownish wash variably manifesting. The base color is overlaid with variable blackish vertical streaks (and occasionally spots), which are more apparent about the wings and back. The scapulars are marked whitish, which provide further contrast when seen against the base color and blackish markings. The wing's dark carpal patches can also display broad panels of buff or almost orange on the wings across the base of primaries, which represent an emphasized version of a pattern shared with other owls that tend to be vole-hunting specialists, like short-eared owls (Asio flammeus) and great gray owl (Strix nebulosa). On the underside, the body tends to be a somewhat paler ochraceous-tawny compared to the upperside. Long-eared owls tend to have dusky streaks on the upper breast, below which they may be heavily marked with herring bone pattern (which is created by dusky shaft-streaks and crossbars on these feathers). There is much individual and regional variation in markings with owls dwelling in more extensively forested regions tending to be of a darker hue, densely washed above as to appear largely dusky brown on the back and the underside overlaid with bolder dusky-blackish marks. Meanwhile, in some desert-like regions, the plumage tends towards a washed out look, at times appearing cream or yellowish, with sparser and lighter dusky markings overall. The facial disc is well developed and variably colored (see subspecies) in the species, rimmed dusky often with white running down along the center through the bill, while at times the white lines form a "moustache" and/or extending to the inside of the facial disc rim. The ear tufts are usually dusky in front and tawny on the back. Long-eared owl possess a blackish bill while its eyes vary from yellowish-orange to orange-red. Tarsi and toes are feathered.

The long-eared owl is a medium-sized owl, which measures between 31 and 40 cm (12 and 16 in) in total length. Their wingspan is relatively large for their size, measuring 86 to 102 cm (2 ft 10 in to 3 ft 4 in). Compared to other widespread owls of medium size and to which they can appear broadly similar in size, such as barn owl (Tyto alba), short-eared owls and tawny owls (Strix aluco), the long-eared owl is lighter and slenderer bodied, with mature weights around half of those of tawny owls being common. As expected in owls and birds of prey in general, long-eared owls display reverse sexual dimorphism in which females are usually larger than males (to the contrary of most non-raptorial birds). Males furthermore may be paler in plumage than females. In Finland, one survey of the body mass of mature birds found that 22 males averaged 288 g (10.2 oz) while 20 females averaged 327 g (11.5 oz). In body mass, European long-eared owls per a study were shown to run contrary to Bergmann's rule (that widespread animals should be smaller closer to the Equator) as body mass seemed to increase further south, being lightest in Sweden, where 37 males averaged 197 g (6.9 oz) and 24 females averaged 225 g (7.9 oz), intermediate in Denmark and heaviest in the Netherlands, where 21 males averaged 256 g (9.0 oz) and 24 females averaged 308 g (10.9 oz). In migratory owls largely from Scandinavian summer grounds in England, the average weight of 8 males was 263.6 g (9.30 oz) and the average of 28 females was 294.7 g (10.40 oz). Meanwhile, in various studies in North America, 38 males (in Montana) were found to average 245.3 g (8.65 oz), 55 males (also Montana in a different study) to average 261 g (9.2 oz) and 15 males (from Idaho) 232 g (8.2 oz). From the same studies, respectively, 28 females averaged 279.4 g (9.86 oz), 49 females averaged 337 g (11.9 oz) and 19 females averaged 288 g (10.2 oz). Museum specimens in North America were found to average 245 g (8.6 oz) in 38 males and 279 g (9.8 oz) in 28 females, while 520 migrating adults in Duluth, Minnesota averaged 281.1 g (9.92 oz). In all, long-eared owl males may vary in weight from 160 to 330 g (5.6 to 11.6 oz) while females may vary from 180 to 435 g (6.3 to 15.3 oz).

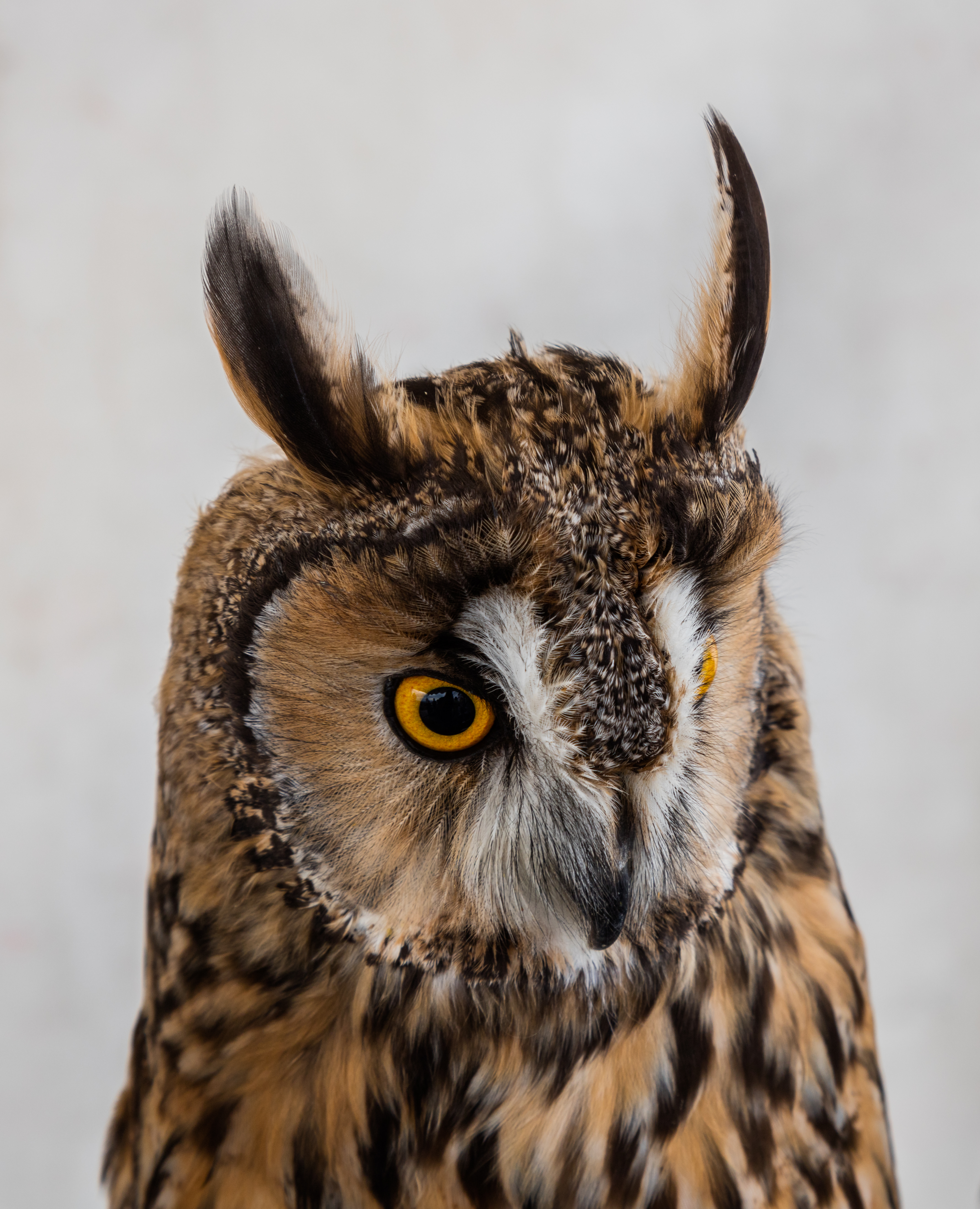
Close-up of the head.

In standard measurements, long-eared owls vary in wing chord length from 262 to 315 mm (10.3 to 12.4 in) in males, with 883 in North America averaging 285.1 mm (11.22 in), and 255 to 332 mm (10.0 to 13.1 in) in females, with 520 American ones averaging 286.2 mm (11.27 in). The tail may measure 121.5 to 161 mm (4.78 to 6.34 in) in males and 143.5 to 165 mm (5.65 to 6.50 in) in females, with 1,408 owls averaging 146.3 mm (5.76 in). Less widely measured are bill length, which averaged 15.7 mm (0.62 in) in males and 16.2 mm (0.64 in) in females from North America, and tarsus length, which averaged 38.2 mm (1.50 in) in 20 males and 39.9 mm (1.57 in) for 16 females from Europe, with a range in both sexes of 36.9 to 42.3 mm (1.45 to 1.67 in). In terms of their skeletal structure, it bears a relatively wide skull but small eyes and orbits, while the beak is elongated but weak. The legs are long and thin and, while needle-sharp, the talons are relatively fine and the feet weak for an owl. However, the talons are still proficient at drawing blood if contact is made with human skin.

=== Identification ===
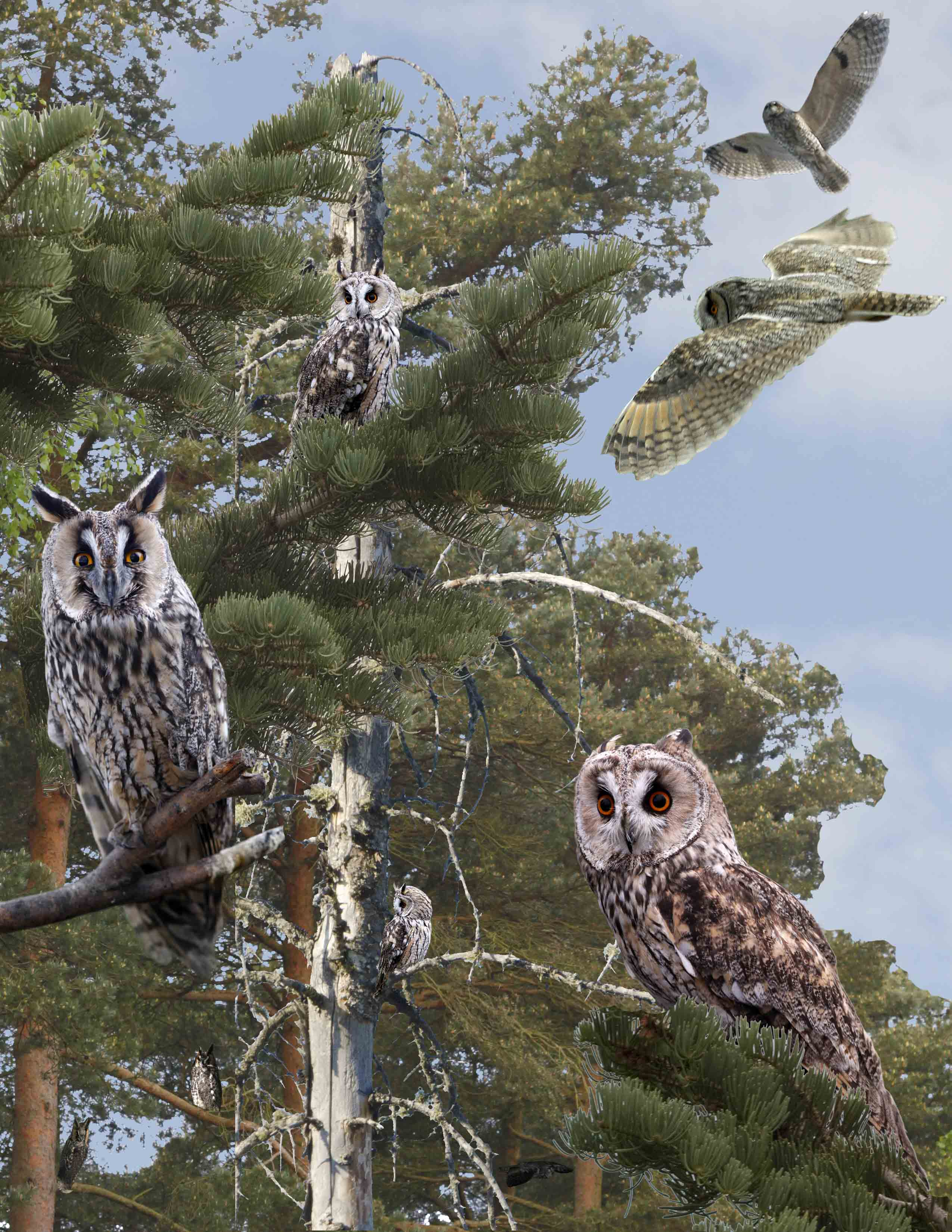
A composite of images of long-eared owl for identification from the Crossley ID Guide Britain and Ireland.

If seen well, an experienced observer is usually able to distinguish a long-eared owl by combination of its field marks, size and coloration. However, some species may be confused for them. The Stygian owl (Asio stygius) (which barely overlaps, perhaps in northern Mexico) is larger with partially bare toes and generally darker with more boldly patterned plumage, with nearly the entire facial mask appearing off-black. Tawny owls, which co-exist with long-eared owls in Eurasia, are unlikely to be mistaken given that they usually appear considerably rounder and bulkier overall (and are indeed slightly larger and much heavier), and possess a much broader, more rounded head. The tawny owl has no ear-tufts, eyes of blackish-brown colour and relatively shorter wings. In flight, tawny owls show well-fingered primaries (with five apparent emarginations) unlike the squared off wings of the long-eared owl. The Eurasian eagle-owl (Bubo bubo) is larger than a long-eared owl with more powerful-looking feet and talons and a huge squared-off-looking head with the ear-tufts set nearer to the edge. The eagle-owl is more heavily patterned on the crown and back with heavy blackish marking but has a less strongly demarcated (and shallower) facial disc when compared to the long-eared owl. In some parts of the wintering range, other eagle-owls may abut the wide range of long-eared owls in Eurasia (and perhaps northwestern Africa) but are usually distinguishable (similarly as in the Eurasian species) by size differences, plumage characteristics and, occasionally, habitat preferences. Asian fish owls, a subset of eagle-owls, are generally also much larger than long-eared owls with tousled-looking ear-tufts, less variable coloring and feathered over only part of their tarsi. In North America, great horned owls (Bubo virginianus), have a squarish head and more widely separated ear-tufts. Like other Bubo species, great horned owls are also larger than any long-eared owl. Great horned owls also have typically heavily barred, rather than streaked, underparts. Scops and screech owls are much smaller than long-eared owls, as well as differently marked (often with more individually varying overall coloring, i.e. from gray to brown to rufous) and usually having rather short ear-tufts. The Marsh owl (Asio capensis) (rare overlap, perhaps in northern Morocco) is generally brown with fine mottling or barring below and has brown eyes and tiny ear-tufts.

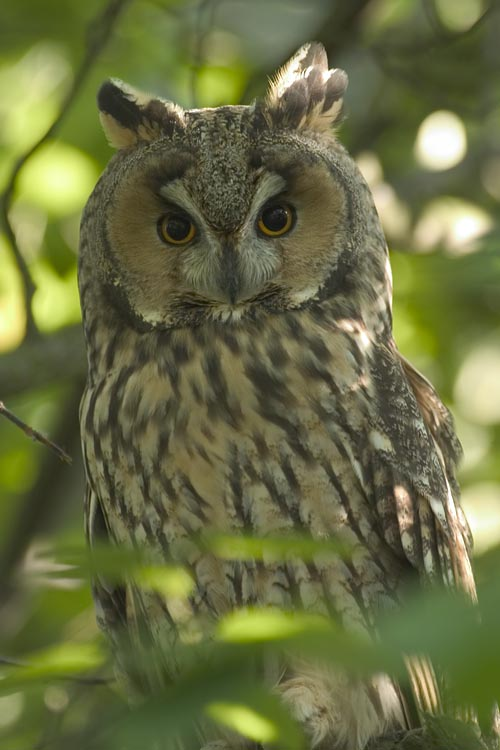
Long-eared owls from the nominate race in Europe are often quite ochre in hue.

Over much of its range, long-eared owls occur with the related short-eared owl, which is slightly larger. Much has been written about distinguishing them in the field, though, if seen well, the resemblance between the species is not particularly strong. Furthermore, the two species differ in habitat preferences, with the short-eared owl often favoring (where available) any kind of entirely treeless, open habitats (including many wetlands and Arctic tundra as well as steppe, prairie and extensive meadows), often avoiding the edge habitats favored by the long-eared owl. However, in dim light, at a distance or in flight, confusion is certainly possible. In both long-eared and short-eared owls, the flight style when seen has a distinctive, erratic and buoyant flapping quality that many birdwatchers consider reminiscent of a moth. At rest, the ear-tufts of the long-eared owl serve to easily distinguish the two (although long-eared owls can sometimes hold their ear-tufts lax). The iris-colour differs: yellow in short-eared, and often orange in long-eared. Furthermore, the black surrounding the eyes is vertical and slight on the long-eared, and horizontal and far more conspicuous on the short-eared. Overall, the short-eared owl tends to be a paler, sandier-looking bird than the long-eared, lacking the darker and more extensive markings of the latter. There are a number of other ways in which the two species differ which are best seen when they are flying. Short-eared owls often have a broad white band along the rear edge of the wing, which is not shown by long-eared owls. On the upperwing, the short-eared owl's primary-patches are usually paler and more obvious. The band on the upper side of the short-eared owl's tail is usually bolder than that of the long-eared. The short-eared's innermost secondaries are often dark-marked, contrasting with the rest of the underwing. The long-eared owl has streaking throughout its underparts, whereas on the short-eared the streaking ends at the breast. The dark markings on the underside of the tips of the longest primaries are bolder on short-eared owls. The upperparts of short-eared owls are coarsely blotched, whereas on the long-eared they are more finely marked. The short-eared owl also differs structurally from the long-eared, having longer, slimmer wings. The shorter and broader wings in combination with a squarer tail in long-eared owls produce proportions more reminiscent of a buzzard than the short-eared owl. When studied by their osteological features, however, the long-eared and short-eared owls are difficult to distinguish.

=== Vocalizations and ear morphology ===
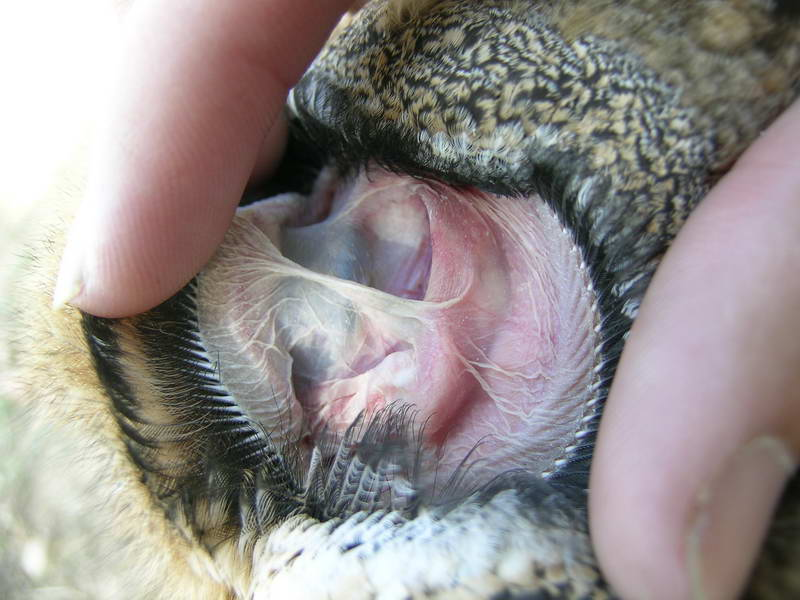
Close up of the long-eared owls relatively large ears.

Various vocalizations and auditory displays of long-eared owls.

The long-eared owl has relatively large ear slits placed asymmetrically on the sides of its head, as in a majority of owls, with the left ear higher and right lower in order to allow them to absorb sound both from above and below. The ear slits occupy very nearly the full height of the skull, being about 38 mm (1.5 in) long and covered in movable skin flaps. The right ear is about 13% larger based on freshly dead owls. Due to its ear structure, the hearing of a long-eared owl is around ten times better at hearing high and medium pitches than humans. Barn owls and boreal owl (Aegolius funereus) have (via convergent evolution) roughly similar ear structures, with the relative size of the ear structure and facial disc in owls generally indicative of the level of importance of acute hearing to their life history. Owls with relatively smaller ear slits and shallower or vestigial facial discs tend to skew towards more crepuscular or partially diurnal behaviors, whereas owls such as long-eared owls are more or less entirely nocturnal. It is well known that a majority of owls can hunt in darkness due to their extraordinary hearing, which allows them to pinpoint locations of prey, but they can also utilize their hearing to track intraspecific calls and activities and avoid predation risks.

Partial Eclipsed Moon and the begging calls of Long-eared Owls after they've left the nest.

The vocalizations of this species are highly variable. Amongst owls of all ages, long-eared owls in Michigan were recorded to have made 23 different vocalizations. Karel Voous considered them to likely be the most diverse vocalists of all owl species in the Northern Hemisphere. The song of the male long-eared owl is a deep whoop, which is repeated at intervals of several seconds. It starts with some hoots at slightly lower pitch before reaching full volume and quality. On calm nights, this song may carry over up to 1 to 2 km (0.62 to 1.24 mi) away (at least to human auditory perception). The song of the male is around 400 hertz. In North America, some observers have considered the male's song as analogous to the deep cooing of band-tailed pigeons (Patagioenas fasciata). Females gives a weaker, less clear and much higher pitched song with a nasal quality. In nearly all owl species, the females, despite being typically the larger sex, have smaller syrinx than the males and so tend to have less powerful voices. The call of the female is at times compared to a weak tin whistle and is only audible at close range, being about 4-5 halftones higher than the song of the male. Females usually call only in duet with male during courtship, but also when the nest is selected and around the beginning of incubation (probably in conjunction with food-begging). Female calling may occur as frequently as every 2–8 seconds at times of night between nest selection and egg laying. Both sexes utter a cat-like, hoarse jaiow notes or high yip-yip notes, the latter reminiscent of a call made by barn owls. When disturbed near the nest holding young, both parents may utter a series of tinny tones, watt-watt-watt-watt. During the period of courtship the male flies around and flaps its wing around, producing a clapping sound. During the display flight, the male make as many as 20 claps. As with many owls, all ages produce hissing sounds and bill snapping when they feel threatened, especially in the context of nesting. Fledging young call all with high-pitched, drawn-out notes, variously transcribed as feek, peeyee and pzeei, and are often likened to the noise of a gate swinging on a rusty hinge.

== Distribution and habitat ==
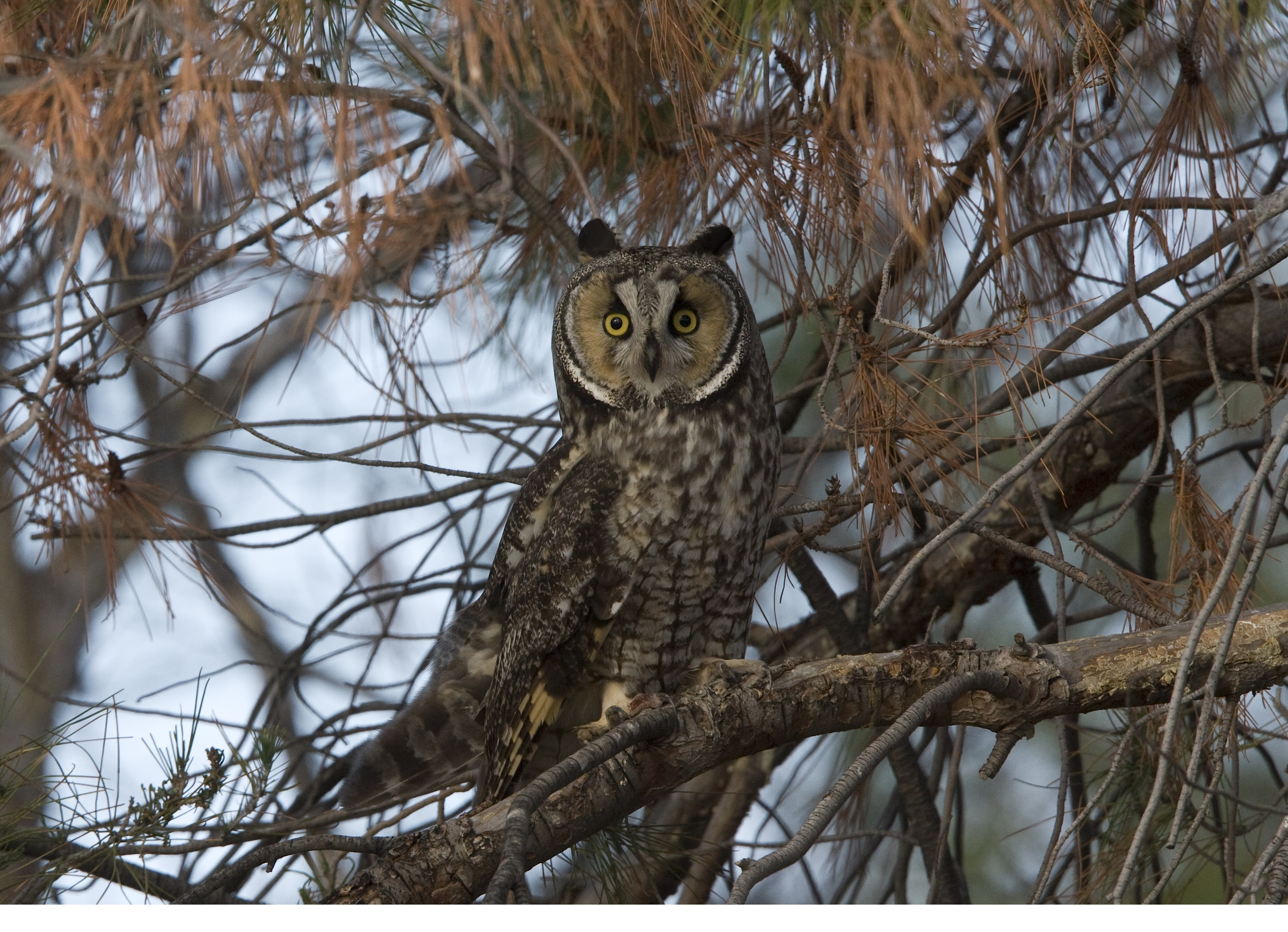
In most parts of the range, such as here in California, long-eared owls favor stands of conifers adjacent to openings.

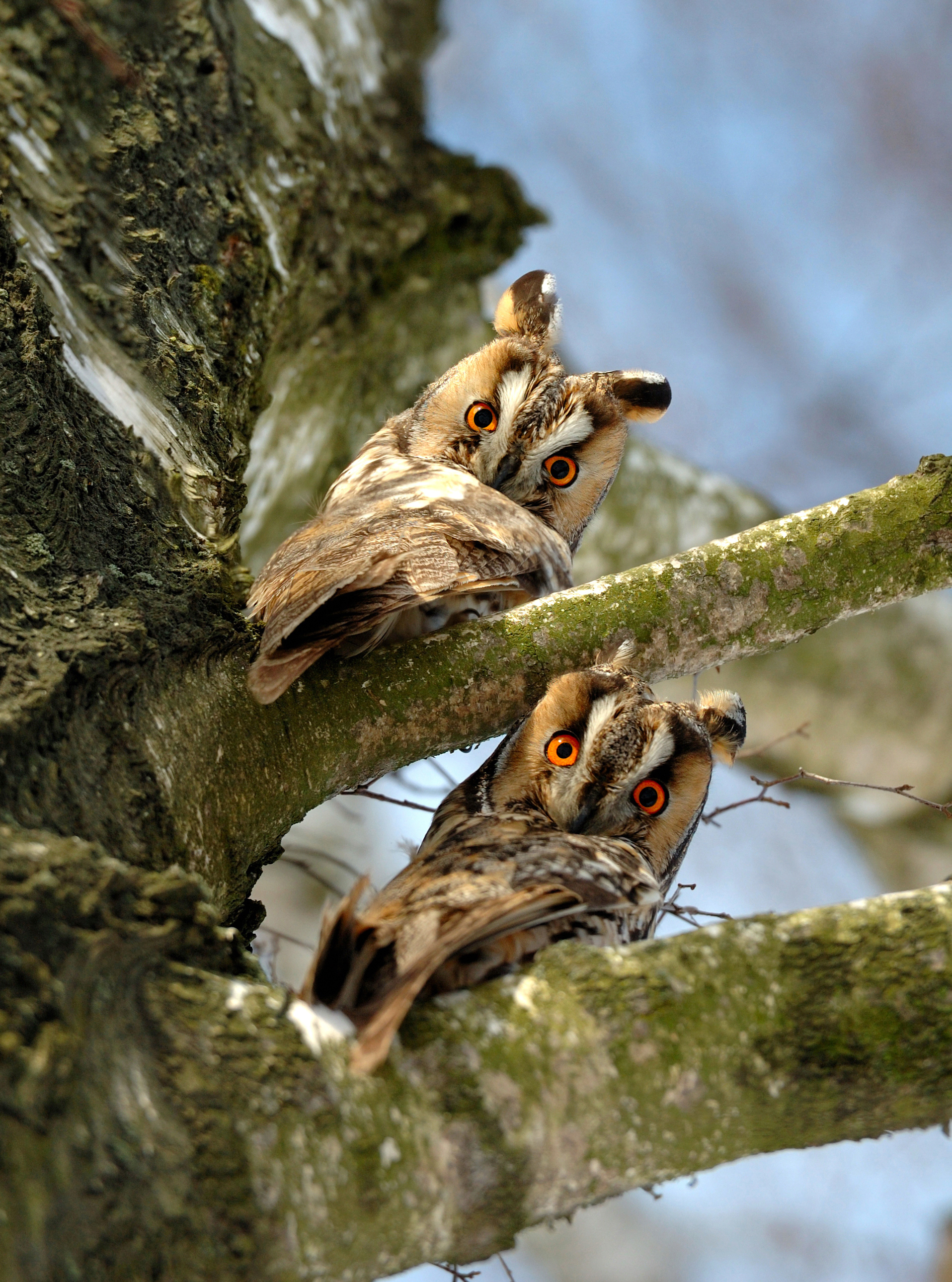
Young long-eared owls in Ukraine

The long-eared owl has an extremely large range. In Eurasia, they are distributed from the Iberian Peninsula and Britain and Ireland. From western France east through the remainder of Europe they are found nearly everywhere. In Scandinavia they are found only as a breeding species in about the southern two-thirds of Norway, Sweden and Finland while they persist year round in the southern tips of Norway and Sweden, respectively, as well as in all of Denmark. In coastal Norway they are found at their worldwide northern limit as breeding bird, with long-eared owls nesting as far north as in the Subarctic zone of Troms. In latitudinal range, they are found as far south the Azores, the Canary Islands while their limited breeding range in north Africa is from Morocco to Tunisia, as well as seemingly in northernmost Algeria. Out of Europe, they are found spottily as breeders in Turkey, northernmost Syria, Israel and Lebanon. They are broadly distributed within Russia, breeding in the southern two-thirds of the country (north as far as Chernyshevsky and Yakutsk) and occurring year around in about the southern third of it (north to the cities of Perm, Tyumen and Tomsk) and east to Siberia, ranging far as Sakhalin. Their range is continuous from Russia into most of Kazakhstan, Georgia, Kyrgyzstan, about half of Uzbekistan and infrequently into northern Afghanistan and Turkmenistan. In the east, they range through of Mongolia (absent from the southwest) and the western and eastern parts of northern China, with seasonally uncertain status in the Koreas. Long-eared owls are found throughout the islands of Japan but mainly winter only in points south of Osaka. The long-eared owl occurs apparently only in winter in parts of southern France, southern Greece, northwestern Egypt, northern Iran, southern Turkmenistan, broadly in much of Afghanistan, Pakistan and northern India (such as the Kutch, Punjab, Kashmir), as well as to the east in Bhutan, southern China, Taiwan and most of South Korea. Irruptive wanderings have resulted in vagrant long-eared owls in places such as the Faroe Islands, Iceland and Madeira as well as Ryukyu Islands in the east.

This species is widely distributed in North America as well. Their northern limits are reached in much of British Columbia, though they are mainly absent from the western and coastal part, with the breeding range scarcely spilling over into the southern part of the Northwest Territories. As is the case in most of Eurasia, they are usually found at up to 50 degrees north. Long-eared owls are also found breeding in most of Alberta, all but northern Manitoba and southern Ontario and Quebec only to the southernmost part of the Hudson Bay. However, with the exception of inland southern British Columbia, southern Alberta, and the southern parts of Ontario and Quebec, as well as an isolated population in Newfoundland, long-eared owls usually vacate their Canadian range during winter. The species range as a breeding species is far more extensive in the west than the east within the United States. They breed in Washington, Montana and North Dakota mostly continuously to much of California, where habitat is appropriate, Arizona, western Colorado and western New Mexico as well as less broadly in South Dakota and Iowa. Even though they are absent from the Pacific coasts in Washington and Oregon, they may be found breeding along the Pacific in southern California and even Baja California in Mexico. The first record of breeding for mainland Mexico was recorded for an incidental observed nest built by owls in Janos Biosphere Reserve in Chihuahua. They also breed and occur year around in most of Minnesota, Wisconsin and Michigan. Breeding and/or year around occurrence is very rare in the eastern U.S. with a few records of them nesting in Maine, Virginia and West Virginia. The long-eared owl occurs much more broadly in North America during the non-breeding season and may found essentially all over the Midwest, Texas and as far south in Mexico as Colima, Veracruz and northern Oaxaca. The species also occurs in the non-breeding season in Louisiana (but for the southeast) and much of northern Mississippi, Alabama, Georgia and South Carolina north to Illinois, Indiana, Ohio and southern Pennsylvania. Very rarely, these birds have turned up in Florida (in times of exceptional irruption) and, as a vagrant, even the Bermudas. They are found also by winter and in migration in much of the east coast of the United States, from the Outer Banks in North Carolina, broadly in eastern Pennsylvania and almost anywhere in Delaware or New Jersey, southeastern New York (including New York City) and north to much of southern New England including almost all of Connecticut, Massachusetts and Rhode Island as well as southern New Hampshire.

=== Habitat ===
Optimal habitat has access to open spaces with short vegetation and abundant prey and wooded cover for roosting and nesting. This species may live at many elevations with no strong altitudinal preferences noted, although they tend to be absent above the montane tree line. Exceptionally, it has nested at 2,700 m (8,900 ft) above sea level in Kashmir. Long-eared owls tend to inhabit open landscapes with groups of trees, hedges or small woods, as well as pastureland with rows of trees and bushes, any type of forest with clearings, forest edges, semi-open taiga forest, swampy areas and bogs, especially those with willows, alder and poplars, orchards with old fruit trees, parks, cemeteries with trees and bushes, even gardens and timbered areas in villages, towns or cities. In many parts of the world, including China, Israel and the American southwest, long-eared owls have adapted to deserts, though more commonly semi-desert, and may nest and roost in available oases, adapting to hunt prey over the open desert, whether sandy or more rocky. The preferred habitat in Great Britain was found to consist most regularly (amongst 200 nests) of small tree plantations, copses or scattered trees on moorlands, heath or mosses (33%), followed by blocks of forest (24.5%), smaller plantations, shelterbelts or hedgerows in various agricultural areas (24%) and scrub or wooded clumps near the coast and in wetlands (15%). All nests in Finland in a study were no more than 500 m (1,600 ft) from cultivated land and only occurred on margins of larger woods or forests. Ecological compensation areas (i.e. habitat for wildlife on privately owned farmland) in Switzerland did provide habitat for long-eared owls but it was found that voles were more extensively hunted in mowed sections of the lands rather than the more densely vegetated areas where voles were most abundant. This indicates habitat (in particular open ground habitat) is more important to the predators than prey densities, at least locally. In Spain, when compared to the little owl (Athene noctua), long-eared owls were more likely to be found in low disturbance areas where forest transitioned into plantations and to areas with a relatively low human presence. A preference by long-eared owls for stands of conifers has been noted in many American studies. In Ontario, the species breeds most often in dense conifer stands of wood and reforestation groves that are often somewhat wet, thence less often in mixed or deciduous areas. A similar association with conifers was observed aseasonally in Michigan. In North Dakota, dense thickets of small trees and brushy margins of more extensive forest tracts were the main habitat for these owls. In western areas where mixed woodlands may occur, however, deciduous stands may attract wintering owls, providing they have heavy growths of climbing vines. In the Sierra Nevadas, long-eared owls are often found in riparian zone of mixed woods around oaks and ponderosa pines (Pinus ponderosa). Analysis from Oregon has shown that forest management had no discernable effect on long-eared owls, indicating that they are not truly forest owls but clearances of riparian vegetation, conversion of foraging areas to agricultural fields and reforestation of open habitats did reduce local numbers. Despite being adaptable to both very cold areas, including the taiga and scarcely Subarctic, and quite warm areas, including drier and/or arid parts of the subtropics, the long-eared owl is largely confined to temperate zones of the north and is less climatically adaptable than the short-eared owl, with the latter species acclimating to nearly all climates and making its homes both in the Arctic and the tropics whether wet and dry so long as open habitats are available.

== Behaviour ==
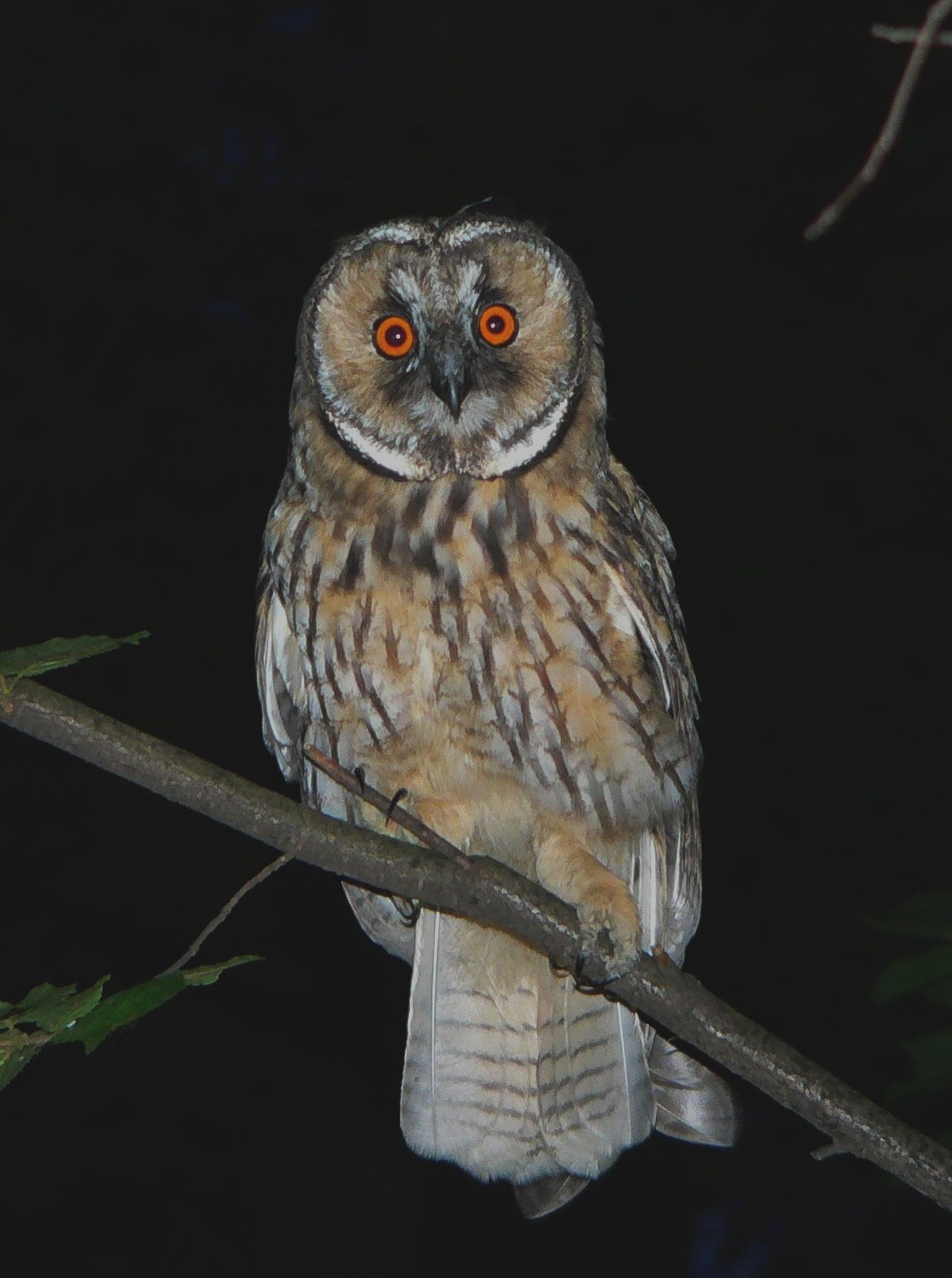
Long-eared owls are usually strictly nocturnal birds.

Long-eared owls are nocturnal. Usually activity for the species commences at dusk. After nightfall, long-eared owls in Idaho were least active from 8-10 pm and from 5-6 am, while the hours around 10 pm -12 am and 3-5 am were often the peak times of activity. When living relatively close to the Arctic, long-eared owls may be forced to forage during daylight, as no full nightfall may occur during summer. When flying by day, long-eared owls are often mobbed by diurnal birds such as corvids and other birds of prey. Often long-eared owls will discharge a fairly large amount of pellets and drop them below regular day roosts. Unlike most other owls, the species has no territorial hunting ground. In Switzerland, 14 long-eared owls examined using radiotelemetry were found to have an average home range of 980 ha (3.8 sq mi). In the study, they required fields along borders of woodlands, avoiding completely treeless areas more so than they were prevalent in the environment. In the České Budějovice area of Czech Republic, 9 radiotagged owls were studied. Nearly equal numbers were found in suburban and urban areas, and urban ones used developed areas for more than 50% of their nocturnal activity while suburban ones used developed areas for less than half of their activities. Similar habitats were favored by both urban and suburban owls but urban owls had to range wider to avoid heavy human activity and access city parks and so had larger average ranges, 446 ha (1.72 sq mi) vs 56 ha (0.22 sq mi), while suburban ones had easier access to meadows and stands of woods.

=== Migration ===
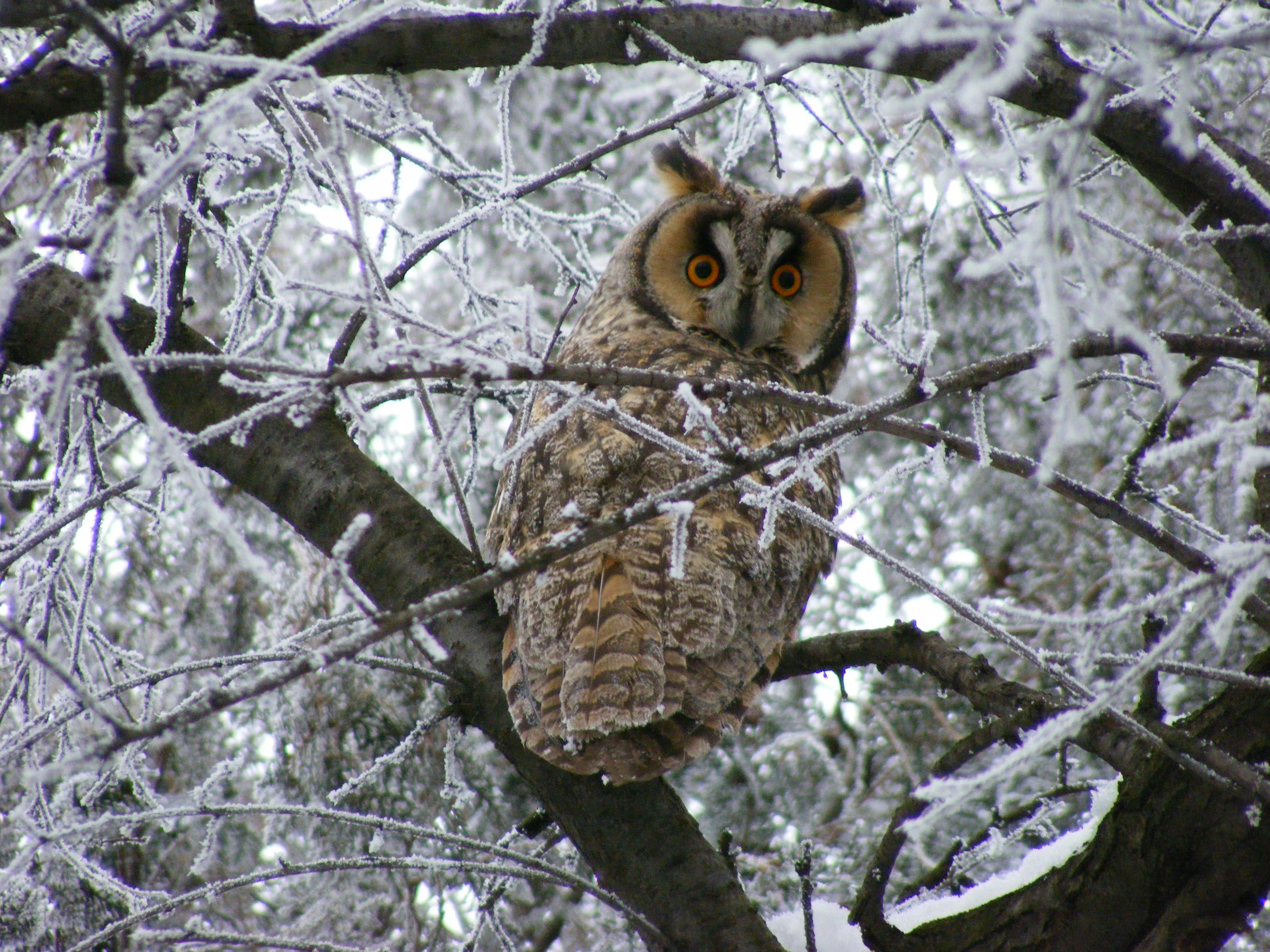
Long-eared owls frequently move south in winter but often stay near cold temperate areas that may hold snow so long as prey remains.

Out of roughly thirty owl species in North America and Europe, the long-eared owl is one of five considered truly migratory, moving annually in at least some areas from summer to winter grounds and back whether or not it is an irruptive year. Northern populations are migratory, showing a strong tendency to wander south in autumn. Some young birds from central Europe migrate southwest than 2,000 km (1,200 mi). Central European adults are less migratory, at most merely wandering in winter. Long-eared owls that breed Scandinavia generally migrate to nearly anywhere in Europe, from Great Britain to Southeast Europe, though some may disperse as far as north Africa or Asia Minor. In Europe, males and females seem to differ slightly in migratory behaviour. Long-eared owls wintering in Denmark were found to be heavily biased towards females, also there is a bias towards females in winter surveys in other areas such as southern Sweden. At 10 wintering sites in Europe, females were 36% more common than males. The hypothesis posited by those that studied the owls in Denmark is that females face a higher rate of predation by larger birds of prey and may distribute away from Fennoscandia where densities are high of those predators and to areas that show low densities of these predators. Another, non-exclusive, theory is that they may be avoiding areas with deep snow that may inhibit prey capture. Supporting data that male long-eared owls winter further north than females was gathered in southern Norway, where the recovery of dead owls (from car or powerline collisions) of the species encountered in late fall throughout winter, males were 45% more common than females. On evidence, many of the females that vacate Norway and even Fennoscandia come to winter in Great Britain (the female migrants here being up to 3.5 times more common during winter than male migrants in one study). Two birds in ringing studies that were recorded in late winter in Germany were observed to return for the summer to central Russia (near Yaroslavl, 2,050 km (1,270 mi) away) and to eastern Russia (near Kazan, 2,410 km (1,500 mi) away). Birds that breed in central Asia have been recorded to winter in a wide variety of locales, including the Egyptian Nile valley, Pakistan, northern India and southern China. In North America, migrants generally sourced from Canada and the Upper Midwest winter almost anywhere in the remaining United States, however they will irruptively migrate as far as Georgia and several areas of Mexico and seldom in Florida. Typically the northern limit of the wintering range fall up to the Okanagan Valley of British Columbia, the southern reaches of the Upper Midwest and central New England. Spring migration was tracked along with northern saw-whet owls (Aegolius acadius) as they migrated through Oswego County, New York via mist nets, with the saw-whet considerably outnumbering long-eared owls. Here, migration of long-eared owl was between March 21 and April 14 and, unlike the saw-whets, the long-eared owl migration does not appear to be effected as extensively by weather conditions. Long-eared owls are 19.5% of owls (or 197 total owls) recorded migrating through Cape May Point in fall (against a majority, 60.6%, being saw-whet owls), with 26.1% of the specimens from the species caught in the mist nets being adults. More than 90% of long-eared owls migrate between mid-October and late November, with the immatures migrating earlier, 52.1% of juveniles having passed through in October whereas only 9.4% of adults migrated in the month. Cape May studies also indicated that 58.87% of long-eared owls were caught in the dark before dawn rather than other times of night. Based on evidence from Cape May, migrating long-eared owls tend to fly higher above the ground than do migrating saw-whet and barn owls but not as high as the short-eared owl, with the latter owl often able to avoid mist nets apparently via its flying height while moving through. Per a study in Idaho, 7 radio-tagged owls actually migrating both north, 75 to 125 km (47 to 78 mi) north of their respective nesting sites, and to higher elevations after the breeding season (in many cases possibly to exploit displaced rodents in recently logged areas).

The long-eared owl has the peculiar ability to increase populations and then disperse in nearly multi-directional movements during good years for prey numbers. Banding records across North America show highly erratic numbers and movements across the continent of North America with unpredictable peak numbers of migrants in completely different years respectively for the states of Wisconsin, Michigan, New York and New Jersey. Therefore, the species is sometimes considered "nomadic" despite many populations of the species being consistent annual migrants. Similar tendency towards so-called "nomadism" is shared by other widespread raptors semi-specialized to hunting voles over open ground, such as short-eared owls and hen harriers (Circus cyaneus). These erratic movements and peaks and ebbs of northern populations has lent to descriptions of the long-eared owl as "irruptive", however it generally moves in quite different ways from owls largely endemic to the taiga (or tundra), which are more traditionally irruptive in that they tend to migrate little or not at all when prey remain ample in their native home range but then move south in mass when prey populations crash. Long-eared owls, unlike these irruptive northern owls, often migrate from the northern areas regardless of conditions. However, like the northern irruptive owls, long-eared owls tend to appear in unprecedented numbers to the south when a peak prey year is followed by a winter during which prey population crashes. In North America, the migratory habits of long-eared owls are strongly mirrored by those of northern saw-whet owls. Study of banding records in Saskatchewan show that the long-eared owl Canadian populations may be considered more truly irruptive species both as a breeder and migrant in that only appears in numbers during peak vole years, with large numbers only in 4 of 44 banding years. During 7 low years, the long-eared owls of Saskatchewan seemed to disappear altogether from much of the province. Peak years also coincided often with snowshoe hare (Lepus americanus) peaks, possibly due to lessened competition (as the larger owls favored prey is locally the hare) and interspecific predation by great horned owls. The phenomena of movements that seem to be nomadic or purportedly irruptive in nature may occur as well in Europe, though given the species' denser population in general there in comparison to North America may result in less noticeable wide variations in numbers. Years with irruptive numbers of long-eared owls have been noted in the British Isles when prey peaks then crashes back in Scandinavia, resulting in much larger numbers of migrant long-eared owls into the islands than normal, as well as concurrently large numbers of short-eared owls and harriers. In southern Finland during a peak prey year followed by a prey crash, a very large number of long-eared owls were detected and were seen to be likely food stressed, as several were foraging actively during daylight despite the extensive nighttime hours during the season.

=== Social and roosting behavior ===
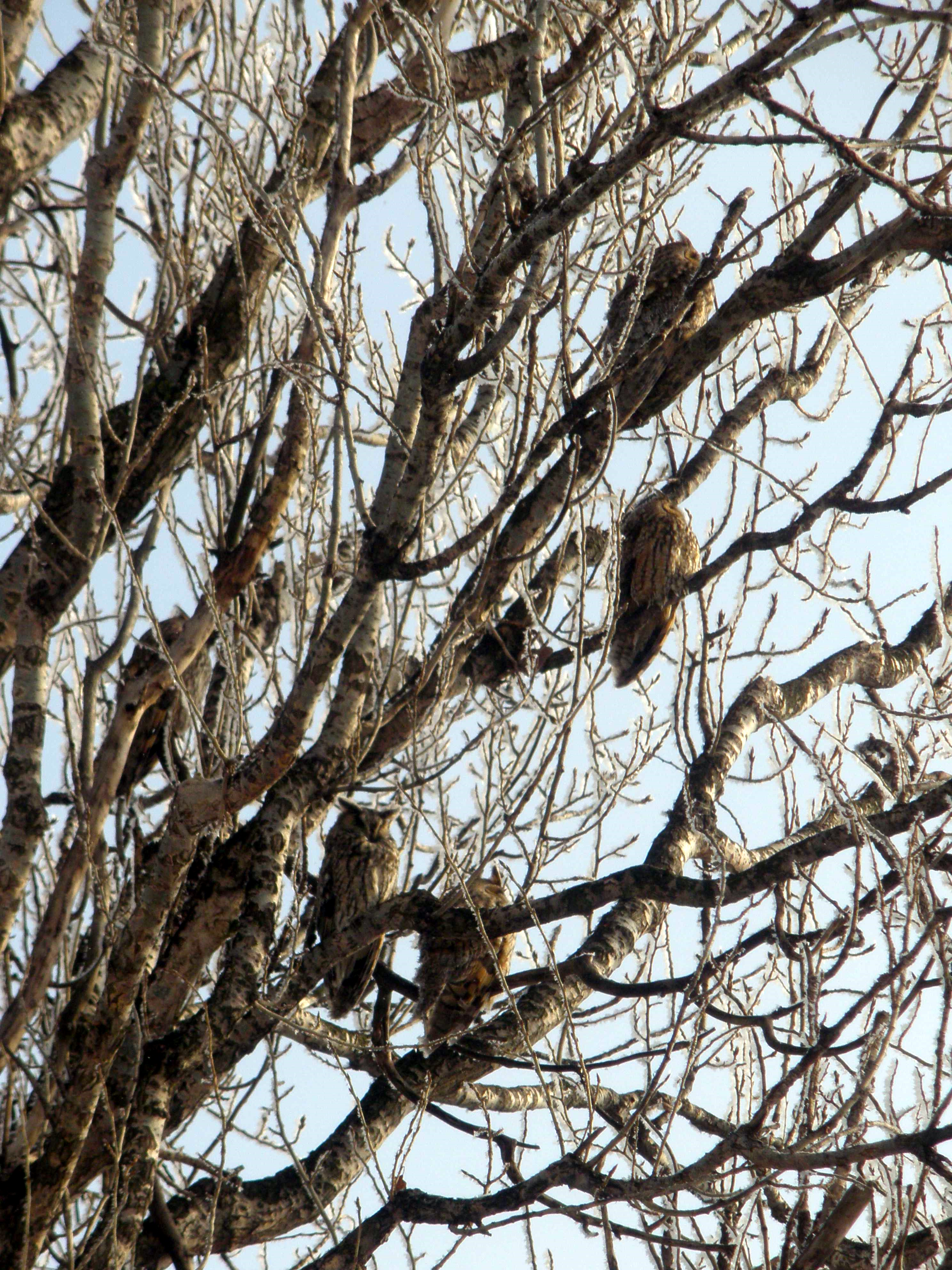
A communal roost of long-eared owls.

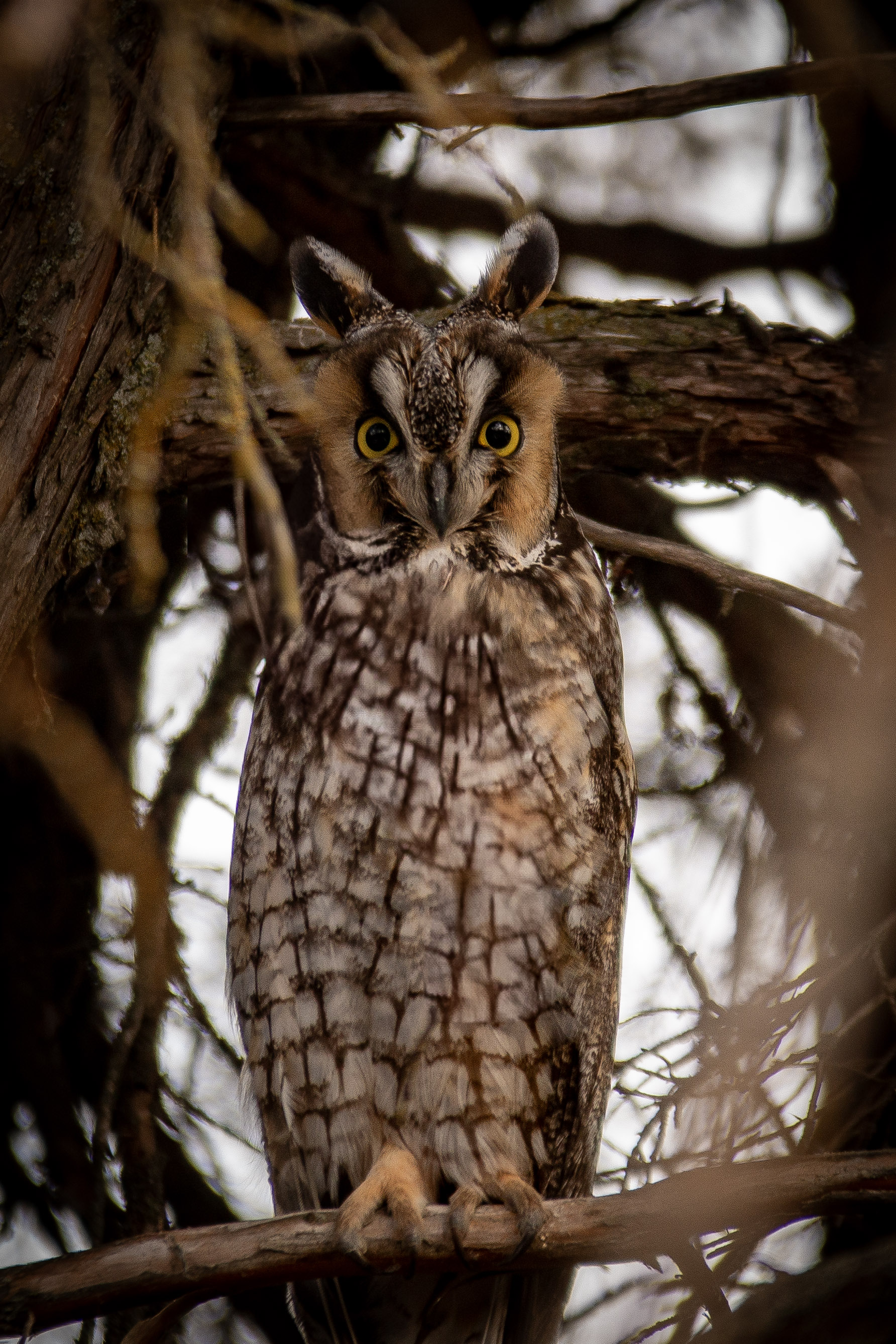
Long-eared Owl

During daytime, long-eared owls tends to roost in an upright position on a branch, close to the trunk, within dense foliage. In winter, the long-eared owl often stays close to the same tree or grove of trees. Usually, when approached, the owl freezes with its body stiffly upright, eyes closed to narrow slits and ear tufts erect. This is called the "tall-thin position" and is common to many typical owls. If approached closed, the owls will alternately open and close their eyes (apparently having stirred but trying to fool potential predators into thinking the owl is still at rest), finally lowering ear tufts, fluffing body plumage and flying to another roost. Unlike most owls, which show a tendency towards territorial behavior on a fixed range year-around when possible, long-eared owls in the non-breeding season may form aggregations of owls while roosting. Such groupings may include 6 to 50 owls, with a European record of about 150 owls at a single roost. Even other migratory owls in the temperate zone do not tolerate each other as closely as do long-eared owls, with short-eared owls seemingly only forming aggregations when food supplies are exceptionally high, while social roosting in long-eared owls seems to occur regardless of local prey numbers. Long-eared owls tend to roost in the depths of the "darkest stands of trees" in order to conceal their presence, though they prefer being close to forested edge to allow access to hunting over more open ground. A study in the New Jersey Meadowlands area showed that roosting owls had a strong fidelity for certain trees, particularly conifers such as cedars where the main truck is large obscured from view and a grouping of at least 2-3 closely clumped trees occurs. Roost height in the New Jersey study was at 3 to 15 m (9.8 to 49.2 ft) or occasionally higher. In New Jersey, different roosts were preferred each year and in the local heavily modified environment, the owls become partially habituated to human activities. However, approach at closer than 3 to 4 m (9.8 to 13.1 ft) away usually caused them to flush. Departure of owls for nighttime hunting would generally occur between 40 and 49 minutes after sundown. Studies in the Moscow region of wintering roosts were done over 10 years, with 12 communal and 14 solitary roosts found. The communal roosts included up to 16 individuals per winter, with a mean of 9.9. Overall, the average in Moscow per roost site was 2.1 owls. Vole numbers the preceding year were likely the causes of numeric variations in years here while wind and snow avoidance were key in characteristics of roost sites. Extraordinarily large roosts were the norm in a study in Stavropol, Russia, where the general roost area could host from 80 to 150 individuals each winter over 4 years, with 93.7% of the roosts located in coniferous trees. In Milan, Italy, from 2 to 76 long-eared owls were observed per urban roost site. Here, nighttime observation showed that owls individually would depart the roost at peak during the darkest part of nighttime. A majority of the Milan roosting owls did not fly toward urban areas instead flying to suburban fields and forest where prey is more easily encountered. The reason for roosting in aggregations seems to be at least in part to mitigate predation risks.

== Dietary biology ==
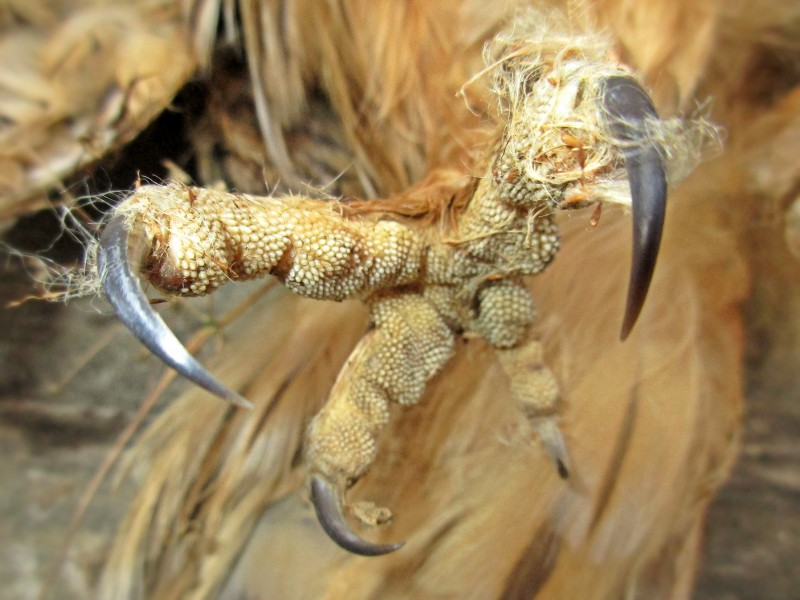
The talons of a long-eared owl.

Long-eared owls may divide their hunting into phases, the first stopping around midnight, the second beginning after midnight and ending an hour before sunrise. While hunting, they focus on woodland edges, hedgerows and open spaces with rough grassland, and over young trees and open ground of all kinds. They hunt mainly on the wing, flying low (around 150 cm or 60 in) and fairly slowly. More often than visually finding their prey, it is thought that long-eared owls most often audibly detect the rustling of their intended food. In lab settings, long-eared owls were more skilled at finding mice by sound in darkness than tawny and barred owls (Strix varia), and in some American experiments even outclassed the auditorily-acute barn owls in this regard. Once prey is spotted, the long-eared owl's flight stalls, then they quickly drop with talons spread to pounce on prey that is perceived, or especially, that comes out into the open. Habitat may be more key than prey numbers to the selection of hunting grounds. Often when prey numbers are more ample in timbered areas nearer the roost or rich marshy areas in the vicinity, the long-eared owls will still come to more prey-poor areas such as old fields so that they can detect prey on open ground. The footspan of a long-eared owl, including claws, reaches on average 11.3 and 12.5 cm (4.4 and 4.9 in) in males and females, respectively, which would be large for a diurnal bird of prey but is quite small for an owl of its size, given the physiological differences in the way different birds of prey tend to kill their prey. While acciptrid raptors tend to kill by stabbing with their talons through vital organs, owls are more likely to constrict their prey to death, so tend to have proportionately larger, more robust feet. In other medium-sized owls, the footspan in tawny owls and barn owls respectively averages 13.4 and 13.2 cm (5.3 and 5.2 in) in between the sexes (notably footspan seems to be a fairly reliable predictor of body mass of an owl as well). Prey capture by long-eared owls was studied and compared to tawny owls in a European experiment. The two owl species caught mammals and beetles caught in similar ways but the long-eared owls shied away from flying sparrows and would only capture the sparrows when they perched (though the tawny did not avoid flying sparrows, it too would only capture the prey when perched). Long-eared owls either disregarded or killed but did not eat amphibians, while tawny owls did catch and eat amphibians when they were available. Occasionally the tawny owls would attack fish whilst one long-eared owl caught but did not eat a fish. The European study further revealed that several owls of different species ate bits of plant and did not appear to do so out of food deprivation or hunger.

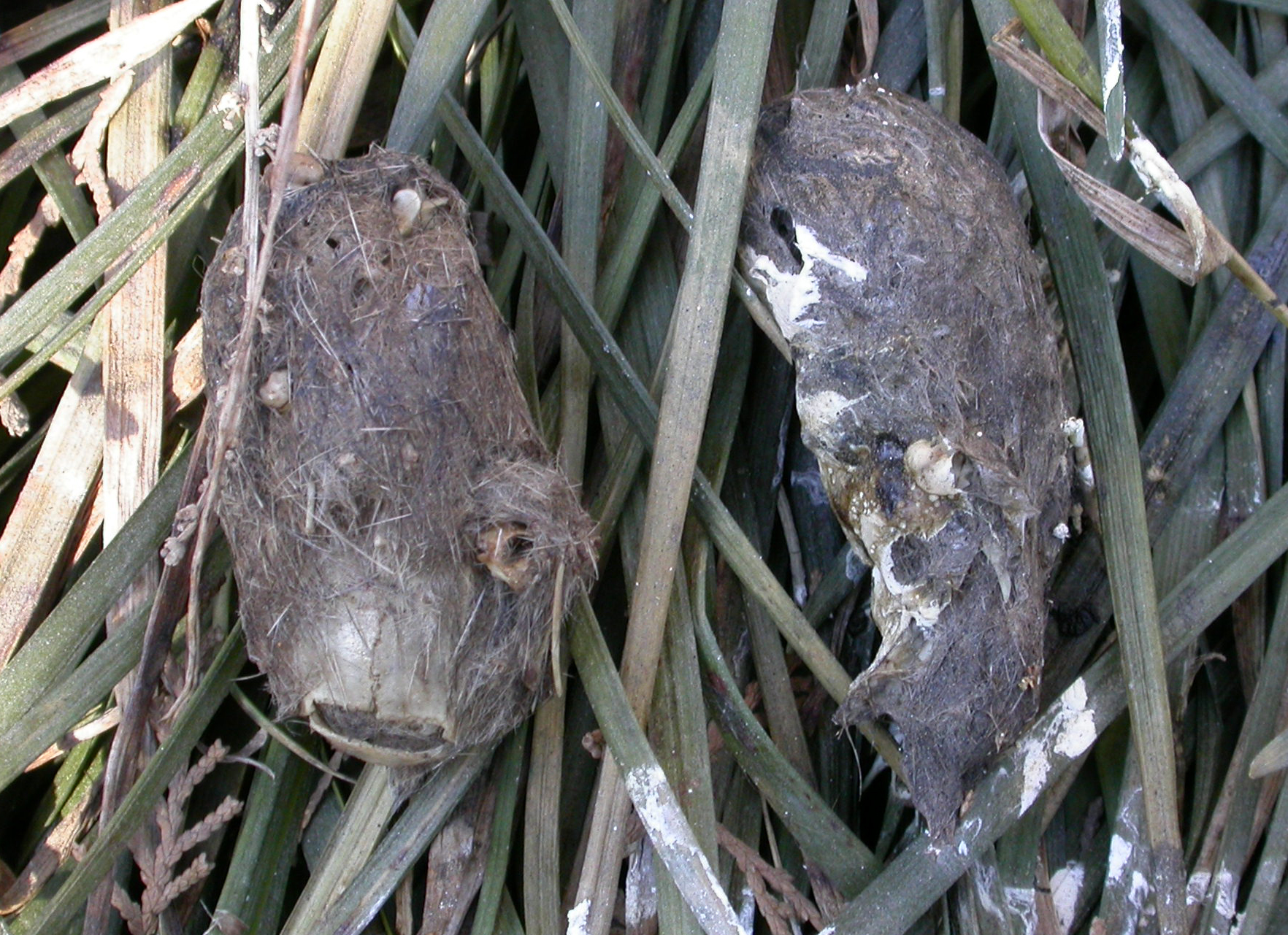
Pellets of long-eared owls.

Taken as whole, the global population of long-eared owls may appear to have a widely varying diet. One study accrued information from 312 studies from around the species' range. In total 478 prey species were found to be described, of which 180 were mammal species, 191 were bird species, 83 were assorted invertebrate species, 15 were reptiles, 7 were amphibians, and reportedly just a couple fish species. This included a total of approximately 813,033 prey items having been reviewed. However, on closer inspection, the long-eared owl generally appears to be something of a dietary specialist. It usually takes primarily, often nearly entirely, small mammals, e.g. rodents, as food in almost every part of its range. Usually a broad picture emerges that between 80 and 99% of the diet consists of mammals, averaging 94% in one estimate for all of Europe. However, in warmer, insular or more urbanized environments, a greater percentage or, rarely, even a majority of the diet can locally be non-mammalian prey. Mean prey sizes have been studied extensively and are almost always fall within a very narrow range. In Europe, the mean estimated prey size overall was 32.2 g (1.14 oz). Meanwhile, in North America, mean prey sizes have varied between 30.7 and 37 g (1.08 and 1.31 oz) in two estimates. In general, throughout their range, the mean size of prey is generally encapsulated between 20 and 50 g (0.71 and 1.76 oz), usually well under 40 g (1.4 oz), and only in cases where long-eared owls, perhaps through lessened competition, has regular access to prey weighing 60 to 100 g (2.1 to 3.5 oz) or more, may the mean prey size range uncommonly reach 50 to 60 g (1.8 to 2.1 oz). Cases of exceptionally large prey are mentioned where they occur below.

=== Mammals ===
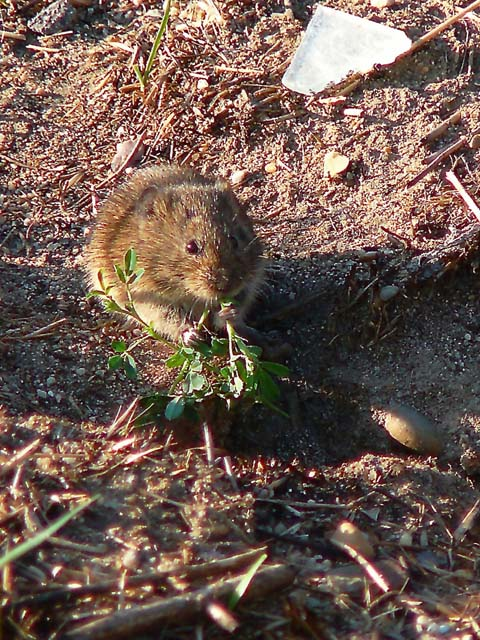
Small rodents such as common voles are the most important food for long-eared owls.

The long-eared owl derives much of its food energy from rodents, particularly voles. In Europe, it is a specialized vole hunter. Out of 86 prey studies in the continent, in about 69% voles made up more than half of the prey. In particular, in the region of central Europe, a little over 82% of 57,500 prey items was made up of voles. Where a variety of voles are available in Europe, long-eared owls show a preference for the most gregariously inclined common vole (Microtus arvalis) over the less sociable field vole (Microtus agrestis). In central Europe, the common vole species alone comprised 76% of the diet . More specifically, in the largest known study from Germany, of 45,439 prey items in the regions of Berlin and Nordharz, common vole accounted for 72%, with the field vole and tundra vole (Microtus oeconomus) collectively another 5.5%. Another large representation of the common vole was in Slovakia, where they made up 84.1% of the diet (27,720 out of 32,192 total prey items). In different years in Slovakia, common voles may range from as much as 92.4% to as little as 57.2% depending on vole numbers. Locally, such as in former Czechoslovakia and in western Ukraine, about 94-95% of the diet may be common voles alone (of 4,153 and 5,896 prey items, respectively). The dietary association with the common vole generally continues to most areas of European Russia, such as Moscow. At times, such as indicated in Moldova, long-eared owls are capable of culling as much as 50% of the common vole population and it was opined that the voles would easily become pestilent to humans if not naturally controlled. Like many voles, common voles are subject to population cycles. In accordance with the cyclic nature of vole populations, the local numbers of long-eared owls can rise and fall sharply. In low vole years, they tend to lay fewer eggs and feed fewer young, and may not attempt to breed at all. In high vole years, they generally lay and hatch more eggs and rear more young. While incubation starts with first egg, only the oldest siblings may be feed in low food years. Generally various species of mice are eaten in poor years for common voles but appear to be an inefficient substitute (at least in more northerly climes) based on the owls' lower breeding rates. Apparently, common voles at times may collectively shift in temporal activity into more diurnal activity in what may be an attempt to mitigate heavy owl predation (especially as basically all European owls tend to hunt them), although several diurnal predators are nearly as specialized predators of them as well. Evidence has indicated that common voles are altering their life cycles with unknown long-term results due likely to global warming. It is likely that the long-eared owls of the region are to be effected by this but it is uncertain exactly what the resulting effect will be.

In some parts of Europe, common voles are at times not found or are locally infrequent or rare, especially on large islands, Scandinavia and some parts of the southern reaches, such as the Iberian Peninsula, Italy and Greece. Therefore, long-eared owls live mostly on different prey species. Supplemental or, occasionally, primary prey when voles are less common are murid rodents, especially the commoner genera such as Apodemus or field mice, Mus or house mice and, occasionally, Rattus or typical rats. In Scandinavian studies, common voles were still the main prey in Finland where distributed (and outnumbered field voles in the owl's diet four-to-one) and partially in Denmark (where foods were split between the two commoner vole species and field mice) but are not in Sweden and Norway. In Sweden, where common voles are not found, field voles were the main food, making up 65.2% of 13,917 prey items, followed by Apodemus field mice species, which were a further 25.3%. In Norway, 3,431 prey items were primarily field voles (42.75%), Apodemus species (12.64%), tundra voles (12.35%) and bank voles (Myodes glareolus) (12.06%). In the British Isles, primary prey switched between field voles (46.6% of 1,228 prey items in the Peak District and 79% in southern Scotland) and Apodemus mice, most especially the wood mouse (Apodemus sylvaticus), (75.6% of 1,772 prey items pooled from different parts of England and 69.5% of 1,373 prey items in Ireland, where native voles are entirely absent). In warmer areas, the long-eared owls may vary in diet depending on local prey composition. In Spain, voles, including common voles, Mediterranean pine voles (Microtus duodecimcostatus) and Lusitanian pine vole (Microtus lusitanicus), collectively made up 76.4% of 6,945 prey items in the central part of the country while on the Ebro in northern Spain, the Algerian mouse (Mus spretus) was dominant, at 69.5% of 846 prey items. Overall, in 7 studies from assorted Spanish locations, wood mice and Mus species were the most regular prey (together accounting for just under 60% of the sum total prey items). Many studies in Italy show that the species is not as much of a specialized feeder in the country with considerable regional variation in prey preferences. Inclement weather in particular, including any kind of precipitation or high winds, seems to cause Italian long-eared owls to increase the diversity of prey that's routinely caught. In some Italian studies, Savi's pine vole (Microtus savii) were the main food, at Prignano Cilento where they made up 60.4% by number and 61.6% by biomass. In others, the wood mouse was the main food, such as Cremona, at 59.1% of 1,482 prey items. An unusual close prey association was noted in northern Italy, where access to landfills allowed them access to exceptionally large prey, brown rat (Rattus norvegicus), with juvenile rats caught that weighed on average 140 g (4.9 oz) and sometimes weighing up to 243 g (8.6 oz), making up 20.5% by number and 65.1% by biomass, although wood mice were the most numerous found prey in pellets. Because of the access to rats, the mean prey size in the north Italian study was an exceptionally high 58 g (2.0 oz) Generally, Mus mice seem to be the main foods for long-eared owls in Greece, especially the Macedonian mouse (Mus macedonicus), but also not infrequently the southern vole (Microtus levis) is important in the diet there as well. In the Canary Islands, the introduced house mouse (Mus musculus) was deemed to primarily support the owls today, consisting of 69.5% of 3,628 prey items per the largest known study.

Outside of Europe within Eurasia, the feeding association with voles for long-eared owls weakens somewhat but does continue apiece in adjacent Turkey, particularly southern vole and Günther's vole (Microtus guentheri) (the latter, for instance, making up to 78.7% of 5,324 prey items in Karapınar). In the Middle East, prey preferences varied based on soil composition in desert edge areas, with Israeli studies showing primary shifting rapidly from Gerbillus gerbil species to Meriones jirds to Günther's voles, with similar findings in wintering owls in Iran. Relatively large-sized prey, Indian gerbils (Tatera indica) and short-tailed bandicoot rats (Nesokia indica), was reported for wintering long-eared owls in Iran estimated to average 163 g (5.7 oz) and 155 g (5.5 oz), respectively, constituted a good portion of the prey (72.9% of biomass) and taken in almost even numbers with smaller Gerbillus species. Much further east, in China and Mongolia, long-eared owls often subsist on different varieties rodent, especially small hamsters, which are also cricetid but not arvicoline, such as the Chinese striped (Cricetulus barabensis) and Roborovski dwarves (Phodopus roborovskii), alternatively with larger jirds, such as midday jirds (Meriones meridianus), as well as house mice. In more northerly eastern regions, voles continue to be of import. In western Siberia, tundra voles, narrow-headed voles (Microtus gregalis), Eurasian harvest mouse (Micromys minutus) and steppe lemming (Lagurus lagurus) were the main rodent prey. In Japan, diet is strongly biased to rodents such as Japanese grass vole (Microtus montebelli) (84.2% of foods in Niigata on Honshu), grey red-backed vole (Myodes rufocanus) (87.2% on Hokkaido) or house mouse (77.7% in Ehime Prefecture, Shikoku).

In North America, long-eared owls also primarily rely on small rodents in their diet, but their diet is somewhat more diverse by rodent family and less completely reliant on voles than their Eurasian counterparts. In general, the further north they are found in North America, the more restricted and vole based the diet is for this species. While diets are poorly researched in detail in Canada, in the northern tier states of Massachusetts, Michigan, Minnesota, Ohio, New York, Wisconsin and northern Oregon voles were easily the main prey for long-eared owls. In particular, the meadow vole (Microtus pennsylvanicus) tends to be a dietary staple, such as in two of the larger American studies, in Michigan where they constituted 70.6% of 3,269 prey items and in Wisconsin where they constituted 83.4% of 3,273 prey items. Another regularly featured vole in the diet in America is the prairie vole (Microtus ochrogaster), but few other voles seem to be taken other than opportunistically excluding Oregon where the gray-tailed vole (Microtus canicaudus) and Townsend's vole (Microtus townsendii) locally led the foods. In North America, non-arvicoline cricetid rodents such as the genus Peromyscus, or deermice, and the smaller Reithrodontomys, or harvest mice, fill the niche of small wild mice and may be irresistible to hunting long-eared owls. Peromyscus mice were the main foods for this species in Colorado, Illinois and most studies from Iowa (composing up to 59.1% of the local diet).

In many areas, particular arid vicinities, the superfamily Geomyoidea supplants cricetid rodents as the primary foods, namely pocket mice, kangaroo rats and occasionally pocket gophers and jumping mice. Particularly this appears to be the case in the American southwest where in Arizona, Perognathus pocket mice composed 61.3% of the diet, in New Mexico, where species pairs of pocket mice and kangaroo rats composed 51.8% and 20.5% of the foods, respectively, and in southern California, where Perognathus were 51% of foods and Dipodomys kangaroo rats were a further 37.8% of the foods. In the Sonoran Desert of Mexico, nearly all known prey were geomyoids, in particular the Merriam's kangaroo rat (Dipodomys merriami), which alone made up 74.7% of the foods. In a well-studied population, Snake River region of southeastern Idaho as well as Owyhee county in the southwest part of the state, geomyoid rodents are usually the most prominent prey, especially the Great Basin pocket mouse (Perognathus parvus) and Ord's kangaroo rat (Dipodomys ordii) (often supplemented heavily with Peromyscus mice). Due to the relatively large size of kangaroo rats, in Idaho, mean prey size may range up to at least 41 g (1.4 oz) In some parts of North America, richer biomass are likely when larger prey takes the primary position, such as cotton rats. Cotton rats were the main prey in Janos Biosphere Reserve, Mexico (43.2% by number, 69.1% by biomass) and in Texas, in the latter slightly outnumbering (36%) the much smaller harvest mice (23%). Since the mean body size of hispid cotton rats (Sigmodon hispidus) caught reportedly is around 100 g (3.5 oz), they probably represent a very productive prey resource for long-eared owls. Similarly, exceptional large prey was taken northeastern Oregon, where both juvenile, weighing about 30 g (1.1 oz) and adult, weighing about 90 g (3.2 oz), northern pocket gophers (Thomomys talpoides) were caught and made up 55.7% by number and 74.4% by biomass of the diets of long-eared owls. Depending on circumstances, the mean size of northern pocket gophers taken in different areas can vary from 41 to 100 g (1.4 to 3.5 oz) or higher, but long-eared owls usually take juveniles outside of the Oregon study (weighing on the lower end of that mass scale).

Non-rodent mammalian prey is seldom of great import to long-eared owls, though they can take other kinds of mammals locally. Despite claims that the long-eared owls "avoids" shrews as prey, it is probably more correct to say that they do not seek them out nearly as often as more socially inclined and/or densely populated rodent prey. Some other owls may be considered regular and common shrew predators, such as often barn owls. In Europe, a broad picture of prey selection indicates about 2% of the diet of long-eared owls consists of shrews. Locally, relatively high numbers of shrews were reported in Finland, where 10.7% of 3,759 prey items were common shrews (Sorex araneus), in southern Scotland, where the common shrew made up 17.3% of 514 prey items, in northeast Greece, where lesser white-toothed shrew (Crocidura suaveolens) were 19.3% of 311 prey items and in western Siberia, where Sorex species were 17.3% of 335 prey items. Similarly, in North America, shrews are rarely more than secondary prey. Exceptionally high numbers of shrews were noted in Ohio, where the relatively large northern short-tailed shrew (Blarina brevicauda) and the relatively small North American least shrew (Cryptotis parva) made up 10.46% and 10.22% of the diet, respectively, and in Tennessee, where 12.85% of the diet was least shrew. The smallest mammal on earth (and thus smallest recorded mammalian or vertebrate prey), the 1.8 g (0.063 oz) Etruscan shrew (Suncus etruscus), may be seldom hunted by long-eared owls. Bats are another supplemental prey type for long-eared owls. One compilation study based on 12 study sites in the Mediterranean area (in Spain, Italy, Greece, Slovenia, Romania and Switzerland) found up to 2% of prey remains were bats. The bats taken in the Mediterranean region ranged in size from the whiskered bat (Myotis mystacinus), estimated at as low as 4 g (0.14 oz), to the European free-tailed bat (Tadarida teniotis), estimated to weigh up to 54 g (1.9 oz). A exceptionally close predatory relationship was noted between bats, especially Japanese house bats (Pipistrellus abramus), and long-eared owls in the Beijing area of China, where bats accounted for 28.6% of 3,561 prey items overall, and 56.6% of the diet locally in urban, rather than suburban, roosts. Other mammals, outside of aforementioned groups (i.e. cricetid, murid and geomyoid) rodents, are known to be hunted but are generally a negligible part of the long-eared owl's diet, including hedgehogs, moles, rabbits and hares and weasels as well as rarely taken rodents like dormice, flying squirrels and squirrels (including chipmunks). While lagomorphs such as hares and rabbits are very rare prey for long-eared owls, occasionally they may capture one. Such prey was estimated to weigh 271 g (9.6 oz) (for cottontail rabbits) and 471 g (1.038 lb) (for jackrabbits) in Idaho, meaning very small young rabbits and jackrabbits are likely captured. However, sometimes long-eared owls can very rarely capture exceptionally large lagomorphs. The record sized mammalian prey to be taken by a long-eared owl, was recorded in the case of predation upon a probable juvenile black-tailed jackrabbit (Lepus californicus) which weighed an estimated 800 g (1.8 lb). Two instances of scavenging on carrion were reported in Italy, the first known case of this for the species, where long-eared owls consumed parts of an adult crested porcupine (Hystrix cristata) and an adult European pine marten (Martes martes), both prey the long-eared owls were certainly unlikely to have killed.

=== Birds ===
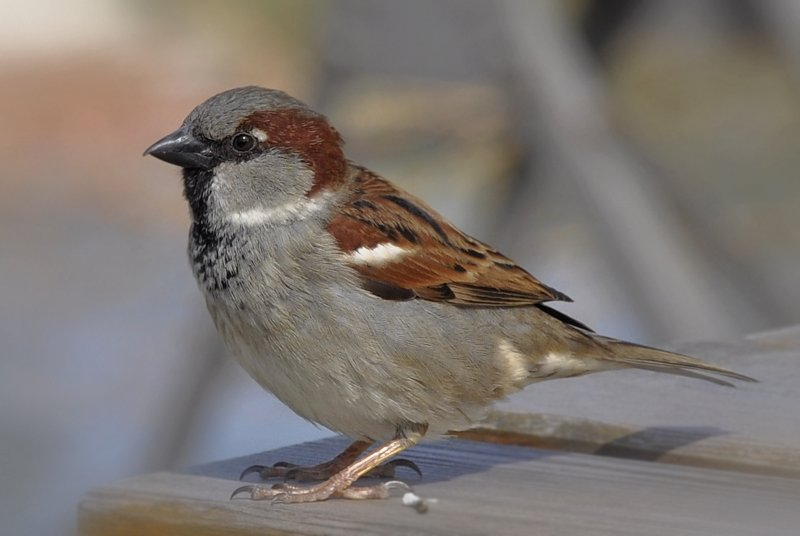
Birds such as house sparrows are often taken by long-eared owls in Europe, especially near cities and city roosts.

Long-eared owls are infrequent predators of birds. Food studies from Eurasia place it as an opportunistic and occasional bird predator, while in North America they are do not seem to generally take large numbers of birds in any area. In winter, sometimes these owls can come to live largely off of small birds gathered in communal sleeping places, often near villages or towns. Snow cover during winter is likely to influence local long-eared owls to switch from mammalian to avian prey. Like barn owls, long-eared owls have been known to hover around roosts in bushes in attempts to disturb the sleeping birds, which may provoke the prey to fly out of their shelter, only to be caught. Long-eared owls, along with migrating short-eared owls, were observed in Spain hunting night-migrating passerines that were attracted to manmade light sources. When killing birds, long-eared owls are likely to peck about the rear part of the body and the head and decapitate their victims, resulting in more skeletal damage than is typical in other owls and making prey identification potentially difficult. Often taken by long-eared owls in urban areas and/or the edge of arid habitat are house sparrows (Passer domesticus) and occasionally the Eurasian tree sparrow (Passer montanus). A surprisingly high balance of prey for wintering long-eared owls in desert areas was shown to be avian. This was in the case in Algeria, where 37.5% of the diet and 40% of the biomass were avian and the most identified overall prey genus was Passer species, at 20.7% by number and 17% of biomass. For wintering owls in the city of Jerusalem, 90.7% of the diet (150 prey items) were small birds, led by house sparrow (22%) and the blackcap (Sylvia atricapilla) (16.7%). Further study of the long-eared owl's diet in Israel's Negev desert showed that 28.3% of 3,062 prey items were birds. In Egypt, 24.6% of prey items were birds including house sparrow (15.4%) and European goldfinch (Carduelis carduelis) (2.4%). In Europe, birds rarely compromise a majority of the foods, but hearty numbers are taken in several areas nonetheless. In central Europe, birds were estimated to contribute an average of 8% of the diet (of 52 species). In peak vole years, birds could be less than 2% of the foods while in vole low years, as much as 33% were made up of by birds. Similarly, in the Sofia park, Bulgaria, the number of birds, with an average 9.6% by number and 7.9% by biomass, was variable based on vole numbers but a high number of 44 avian prey species were recorded. In the Sonian Forest, Belgium, 38.3% of 355 prey items were birds, mostly of various passerine species. A study in Baden-Württemberg, Germany found birds to compromise 14.75% of 12,890 prey items, a relatively high balance, with the most common identified bird species being the European goldfinch. Overall British studies found in a sample of 7,161 prey items that 1,161 were birds (14.95%) and that bird were present in 90% of examined pellets. Of these, 46.9% were house sparrow, 7.5% were common starling (Sturnus vulgaris), 4.65% were common blackbird (Turdus merula), 3.35% were European greenfinch (Chloris chloris), 2.92% were song thrush (Turdus philomelos), 2.49% were Eurasian skylark (Alauda arvensis) and 2.23% were common linnet (Linaria cannabina). More locally in the Peak District of England, birds were 23% of the prey by number and 31.3% by biomass. Of the birds examined here, a majority of those identified were meadow pipits (Anthus pratensis) followed by twite (Linaria flavirostris), and identified birds ranged in size from a probable wood warbler (Phylloscopus sibilatrix) (average adult weight 9.2 g (0.32 oz)) to an adult northern lapwing (Vanellus vanellus) (average adult weight 219 g (7.7 oz)). Furthermore, 80% by number and 11 of 25 bird prey species were characteristic of open habitat.

Many Italian studies reflect relatively high numbers of birds being hunted, mainly in the non-breeding times. At Prignano Cilento, 13.85% of prey was made up of mostly unidentified birds. In Regional Park of Decima-Malafede, birds were 31.1% of the diet, 13.7% of which were unidentified passerines, while European goldfinches and European greenfinch accounted for a further 7.1% and 4.6% of the prey items. In the Venice area, of 642 prey items examined and a total prey mass of 15,038 g (33.153 lb), birds made up 38.47% by number and 41% of the biomass. In the winter roost of Imperia, 63.43% of 1,020 prey items were birds and 36.57% were mammals. The main prey identified was the blackcap (51.6%) while the chaffinch (Fringilla coelebs) was secondary among avian prey (6.73%). In Romanian studies avian prey was relatively important as well. In Agigea there, 32.71% of the foods were birds, with Carduelis species combined constituting 6.04% and swallows being secondary such as the common house martin (Delichon urbicum) (2.52%) and the barn swallow (Hirundo rustica) (2.44%). Birds were the main foods for wintering long-eared owls in Romania's Danube Delta, with birds making up 59.5% of total prey by number and 51.6% by biomass of 948 prey items against 40.7% by number and 48.4% by biomass for mammals. Here, numerous passerines were mostly taken with the finch family (18.6%), Old World sparrow family (15.7%) and the tit family (12.7%) being the commonest prey families among the birds. The mean bird prey size was calculated at 22.2 g (0.78 oz) while the mean mammal prey size was 24 g (0.85 oz). House sparrows accounted for 14.3% of biomass and Eurasian blackbirds for 12.3% of the biomass on the Danube. While mammals usually are dominant in the diets of long-eared owls in Spain, in the Albufera reserve of the nation, birds were 53.5% by number and 48.6% of the biomass of 864 prey items. A total of 34 species of birds were noted, led by common chiffchaff (Phylloscopus collybita) (12.5% by number, 4.8% by biomass), house sparrow (8.2% by number, 12.2% by biomass), barn swallow (6.4% by number, 7% by biomass) and sand martin (Riparia riparia) (3.2% by number, 2.7% by biomass). The main recorded individual prey species in Beijing was the Eurasian tree sparrow, at 38% of the diet, but other avian prey was negligible here.

While most of the passerines attacked by long-eared owls are well within typical prey sizes for this species, while pursuing bird prey many reports note that unusually large prey may be attacked. Avian prey weighing around 100 g (3.5 oz) or somewhat higher such as the larger common thrushes or jays is not uncommonly taken. However, unusually large bird prey for long-eared owls in Europe has included several species at least twice as massive, including adults of the following species: northern lapwings, common wood pigeon (Columbus palumbus), with an average adult weight of 490 g (1.08 lb), common moorhens (Gallinula chloropus), with an average adult weight of 343 g (12.1 oz), red-legged partridges (Alectoris rufa), with an average adult weight of 528 g (1.164 lb), western jackdaws (Corvus monedula), with an average adult weight of 246 g (8.7 oz) and Eurasian magpies (Pica pica), with an average adult weight of 230 g (8.1 oz). Much of the largest identifiable and provable prey for long-eared owls in Europe overall were found to be birds. Despite the relatively scarcity of avian prey in the diet in North America (one example being bluebirds), unusually large avian prey has been reported there as well. Such prey have included adults of Northwestern crow (Corvus caurinus), averaging 392 g (13.8 oz), two large adult ruffed grouse (Bonasa umbellus), estimated to weigh slightly over 600 g (1.3 lb), and even apparently at least once an adult sharp-tailed grouse (Tympanuchus phasianellus), which average a relatively huge 885 g (1.951 lb) or three times heavier than an average long-eared owl.

=== Other prey ===
Other than mammals, which compromise a great majority of foods, and birds, which compromise a secondary but locally important portion of the foods, other prey varieties are seldom taken by long-eared owls anywhere. Infrequently, reptiles such as handful of species of snakes and lizards and even fewer amphibians such as frogs and toads. Generally these prey turn up more than singly only as far as is known in slightly arid warmer parts of the species range, mostly within the Canary Islands and occasionally the American southwest. Fish are almost never recorded in the diet with a total of two prey fish species, both carp and further unidentified carp, recorded in Europe. Despite a rather high diversities of insects (and a low diversity of other invertebrates like arachnids) collected overall, especially in different parts of Eurasia, they are rarely significant contributors to the long-eared owl's diet. Usually in Europe, if any insects are found in pellets, they tend to contribute less than 2% to the prey numbers. Similarly present but slight numbers of insects were noted in Israel as well. Exceptionally large contributor of insects, most often a variety of species or genera of beetle, to prey numbers are noted in some studies such as contributing 6.6% of the diet in Regional Park of Decima-Malafede in Italy, 17.5% in northeastern Greece and 13.3% in western Spain. The record contribution for insects for Europe was a study in central Poland where a single beetle, the common cockchafer (Melolontha melolontha), was found to constitute 25% of the prey items. Based on a couple studies in Algeria, insects are a common supplemental food there, contributing up to about 17.3% of the prey items. On the isle of Tenerife in the Canary Islands, an exceptional 33% of the food was recorded to be insects, with both bush crickets and field crickets contributing 14.8% each, although in broader Canary island studies the significance of insects is reduced to 10.4%. The maximum known contribution of insects to the diet in North America was merely 4.3% of the foods for communal roosting long-eared owls in southeast Idaho.

=== Interspecies predatory relationships ===
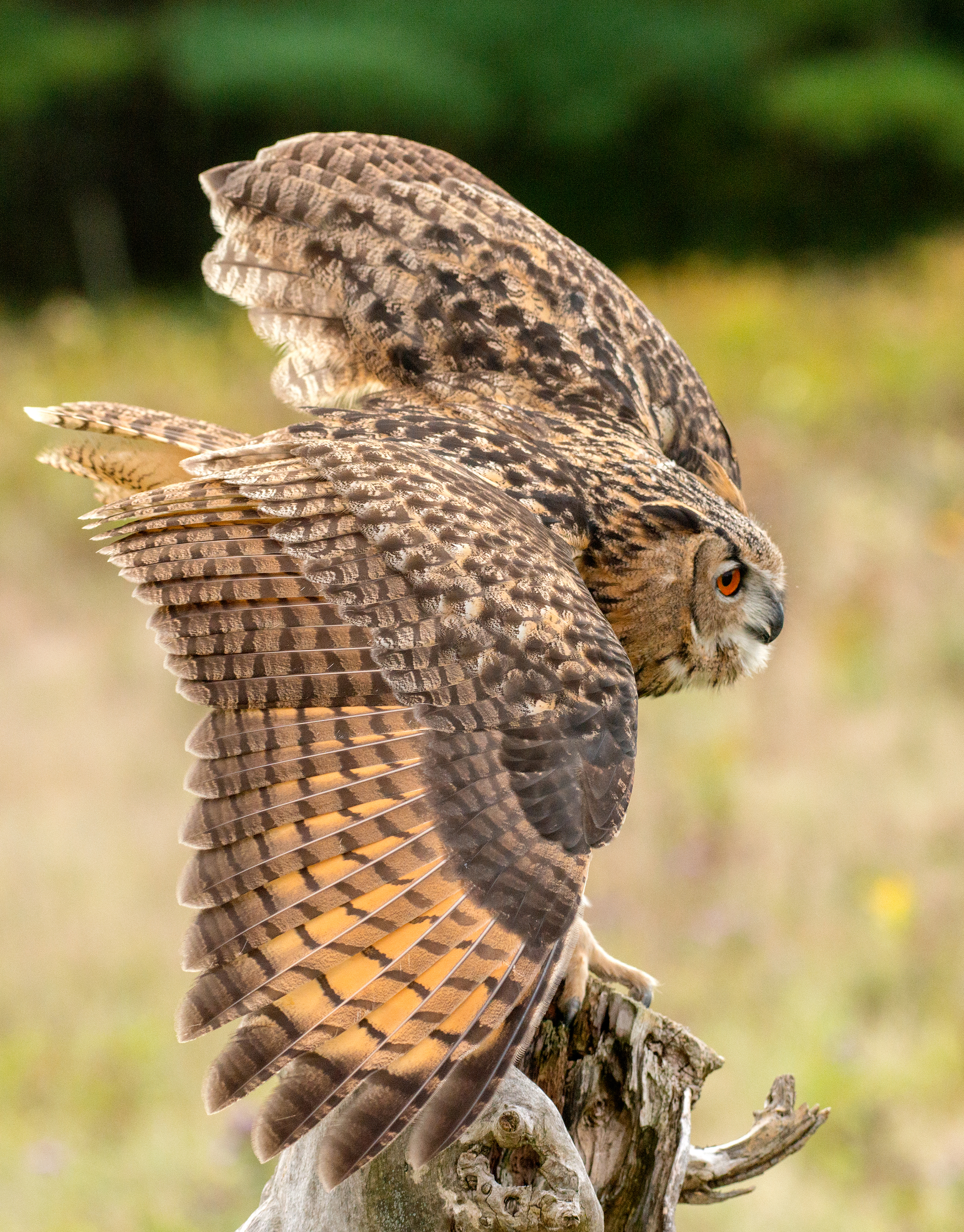
Larger owls, especially the Eurasian eagle-owl, and diurnal raptors can be serious predators of long-eared owls as well as competitors for food.

The long-eared owl occurs in multiple competitive environments of the temperate zone alongside other birds of prey. A wide variety of owls are especially likely to be encountered both in terms of shared nocturnality and a shared preference for rodent prey, which is favored by about 75% of owls found in North America and about 85% of the owls found in Europe and occasionally favored by nearly all owls in both continents. Much study has gone into contrasting the ecology of long-eared owls against other owls and also occasionally diurnal birds of prey, especially in terms of differences in dietary habits and habitat preferences. In Europe, arguably the most populous owl is likely the tawny owl, which has therefore warranted a considerable number of comparisons with long-eared owls. While tawny owls overlap in prey preferences with the long-eared owl, it tends to show greater dietary flexibility, with larger contributions of secondary prey such as birds, reptiles and amphibians and insects. For example, in southern Sweden, the food niche breadth of tawny owls was roughly three times greater than that of long-eared owls. Generally tawny owls prefer more extensively wooded environments than long-eared owls but can adapt as well as the long-eared to forest fragmentation and peri-urbanisation, thus often competing rather directly over foods. While the tawny owl usually selects slightly larger prey on average than long-eared owls, often over 30 g (1.1 oz) mean prey mass, studied size of common voles hunted in central Lithuania showed that both long-eared and tawny owls selected larger than average voles, with average caught estimated at 21.45 g (0.757 oz) against the average weight surveyed by humans at 16.42 g (0.579 oz). Surprisingly, especially in the non-breeding season in this study, long-eared owls in Lithuania tended to select larger voles on average (at 21.56 g (0.761 oz)) than did tawny owls (19.56 g (0.690 oz)). Despite the potential for competition and mortality (for long-eared owls) in the interspecific relationship between the tawny and long-eared owls, the proximity of tawny owls in a study from Switzerland appeared to have no deleterious effect on the breeding on the long-eared species. A few studies have examined the habits of the little owl, probably the next most common European owl and just ahead of the long-eared owl in third, and the long-eared owl in areas where their somewhat overlapping habitat preferences draw them into similar areas. However, the long-eared owl takes larger prey on average usually than little owls, since it focuses more on rodents rather than invertebrates like insects and earthworms and, especially during winter, varies its prey compositions less so than the smaller species. Also, the long-eared owl requires some timbered spots for roosting purposes while little owls can adapt to both treeless and partially treed areas as well as, in Spain at least, more heavily modified areas by humans. Many diurnal raptors in Europe broadly overlap in dietary habits, largely taking voles where they are available, including most species of harrier, buzzards and some falcons, especially common kestrels (Falco tinnunculus). Other than occasional predatory interactions, competition is limited with most of these diurnal birds of prey due to the temporal differences of their habits. In Europe, several other owls, from ones much smaller than to a few species much larger than a long-eared owl, prefer voles and/or lemmings as prey but often differ considerably in their habitat preferences, distributions, nesting habits and/or hunting habits so the long-eared owls are largely naturally partitioned from competing directly with them.

On a broader scale, both short-eared owls and barn owls potentially compete for resources with long-eared owls. Despite overlap in both range and diet, long-eared owls are buffered from competition with short-eared owls by habitat preferences, as the short-eared owls choose more open habitats, generally roosting and nesting in tall grasses rather than timber, and seldom hunt in the same edge habitats as the long-eared species. In western Russia when compared to short-eared owl, long-eared owl showed less of a tendency to appear in cluster where prey was concentrated, most likely because of the habitat differences. In both western Russia and further east in western Siberia, the short-eared tended to take more tundra voles in addition to common voles, while long-eared owls focused more exclusively on common voles. Comparisons between barn and long-eared owls have been made in many areas of the latter species less extensive range. The habitats used by the barn and long-eared owls are not mutually exclusive nor are their prey species. Despite being similar aerial hunters of open areas, barn owls differ in life history in many respects from long-eared owls, in part by being cavity nesters. While their dietary habits can appear similar and show similar dependence on small mammals, barn owls are somewhat more generalized and catholic as feeders, with less of a heavy reliance on voles. Barn owls can live quite well on virtually any small mammal assemblage. In some parts of Europe, the two species' food niche breadth is comparable or even slightly higher in the long-eared. However, globally barn owls are much more wide-ranging, more tropical in their central range and globally have a much wider prey spectrum than long-eared owls. Barn owls are also more widely adaptive to insular living than long-eared owls, and are capable living proficiently on a diversity of prey classes even in environments completely lacking small mammals. The American barn owl race is larger than the western barn owl race from Europe and relevant parts of Asia, being more comparable in body mass and foot and talon size to the tawny owl while the western race in Europe is roughly intermediate between the tawny and long-eared owls in body size and foot span. Consequently, in the Americas, barn owls tend to consistently take slightly larger prey than long-eared owls and tend to access a broader overall feeding niche. Despite the great adaptability and range of the barn owl, it was found in a study from France that they experience higher mortality due to starvation than long-eared and tawny owls. This was attributed to the barn owl's inferior lipid fat reserves while they attempt to survive the cooler seasons within temperate climates, as they are better suited to survival in warmer climates.

North America has more species of owl than Europe and can be considered a more competitive environment for long-eared owls living there. However, again, in most cases habitat preferences, slight partitioning in dietary preferences (which may be in prey species or body sizes of prey selected) and life histories generally allow most species to persist even when living in proximity to one another. As throughout their range, long-eared owls tend to differ from most other North American owls by being much more migratory in nature. Therefore, cyclic food variations affect them differently and are less likely to be the direct cause of winter mortality than in more permanently residential owls. Oddly enough, among American owls, long-eared owls most strongly mirror the much smaller northern saw-whet owl in distribution, migratory habits and, to a lesser extent, food habits. The main food of saw-whet owls tends to be Peromyscus mice where they are available and, like most owls, their rodent food selection can broadly overlap with that of long-eared owls. It has been posited that the less broadly ranging occurrence of long-eared owls in general compared to in their European range is in part due to greater resource competition between them and the two widespread screech owls, the eastern (Megascops asio) and western screech owls (Megascops kennicotti). However, the feeding niche tends to be much wider and more opportunistic in screech owls, which often feed on a diversity of invertebrates (mainly insects but also crayfish) and alternate prey (a higher balance of birds and frogs, for instance) and so are unlikely to competitively limit rodent numbers to the detriment of long-eared owls.

The most easily observed and most dramatic portion of interspecies owl and raptor ecology is interspecific predations. In this regard, long-eared owls are much more often the victims rather than the predators. Their generally successful life history on the contrary often makes long-eared owls perhaps more vulnerable than most other medium-sized owls to predations and even perhaps many smaller owl species. These include nesting in relatively open abandoned bird nests rather than hard to access cavities. Also, long-eared owls tendency to occur in quite open areas whilst hunting coupled with the loud vocalizations (including begging calls of their fledglings) and other auditory displays are all likely to court predators. In Europe, their most serious predators tend to be the Eurasian eagle-owl and the northern goshawk (Accipiter gentilis). One account recorded 768 instances of predation by eagle-owls and 317 by goshawks (or 55% of the owl prey for recorded for goshawks in Europe). Long-eared owls rank in the five most regular predated bird species by eagle-owls in Europe. Some biologists feel that long-eared owls tendency to avoid richer prey concentrations in favor of opener habitats and spatial usage, especially while migrating and wintering, is partial dictated by the detection of eagle-owl (and perhaps goshawk) activity, so therefore the eagle-owl has a serious influence on the long-eared owl's life history. In general, long-eared owls endure predation by a formidable array of diurnal birds of prey in Europe. It is likely that largely perch hunting raptor such as Buteo and most eagles may either chance upon an owl roost during a hunting foray or encounter a long-eared owl perhaps during overlapping activity around dawn or dusk, while large falcons are likely to only strike one down when an owl is flushed during daytime. Goshawks and other Accipiter hawks are a particularly deadly threat among diurnal raptors due to their intensive searching hunting methods and willingness to dive into wooded thickets holding roosting owls. Beyond goshawks, diurnal raptors in Europe known to be predators of long-eared owls of potentially any age are known to include golden eagle (Aquila chrysaetos), Bonelli's eagle (Aquila fasciata), eastern imperial eagle (Aquila heliaca), greater spotted eagle (Clanga clanga), lesser spotted eagle (Clanga pomarina), black kite (Milvus migrans), red kite (Milvus milvus), white-tailed eagle (Haliaeetus albicilla), common buzzard, rough-legged buzzard (Buteo lagopus), peregrine falcon (Falco peregrinus), saker falcon (Falco cherrug) and even (in two cases) the slightly smaller Eurasian sparrowhawk (Accipiter nisus). Other than eagle-owls, tawny owls and Ural owls (Strix uralensis) regularly kill long-eared owls where their ranges meet, though in some cases these may begin as territorial attacks by the Strix owls, the smaller long-eared may be consumed regardless.

In North America, the range of predators of long-eared owls is no less daunting. Undoubtedly the most dangerous American predator is the great horned owl. Similarly as in its European eagle-owl counterpart, horned owls kill long-eared owls regardless of season and conditions. However, despite many accounts of predation, long-eared owls do not generally seem to be as prominent in the diet of great horned owls, at least as so far documented, as they are in the diet of Eurasian eagle-owls. Barred owls can also be somewhat serious predators of long-eared owls as well. Rarer acts of predation on long-eared owls in North America have reportedly been committed by spotted owls (Strix occidentalis) and even their cousins, the short-eared owl. Diurnal predators of long-eared owls including some species that also hunt them in Europe such as golden eagles, northern goshawks and peregrine falcons, as well as bald eagle (Haliaeetus leucocephalus), Cooper's hawk (Accipiter cooperii), red-tailed hawk (Buteo jamaicensis) and red-shouldered hawk (Buteo lineatus). Though less well documented throughout the range, long-eared owls are also vulnerable to mammalian predators, mainly near the nest. Suspected or confirmed predators in Europe are often European pine martens or stone martens (Martes foina), which are likely to depredate nestlings but also will consume eggs and adults if they are able to ambush them. Martens are also a potential threat in North America, as are the North American porcupine (Erethizon dorsatum), bullsnake (Pituophis catenifer) and, especially, the raccoon (Procyon lotor) (the latter species may semi-regularly kill and eat brooding adult female long-eared owls). Corvids, many of which build the nests long-eared owls use, such as magpies and crows will also semi-regularly raid the long-eared owl's nests and eat the eggs or nestlings. On the other side of the equation, long-eared owls themselves may infrequently prey on smaller owls. This species has been known to hunt eastern screech owls, little owls, Eurasian pygmy owls (Glaucidium passerinum) and boreal owls (Aegolius funereus), as well as the young of the common kestrel.

== Breeding ==
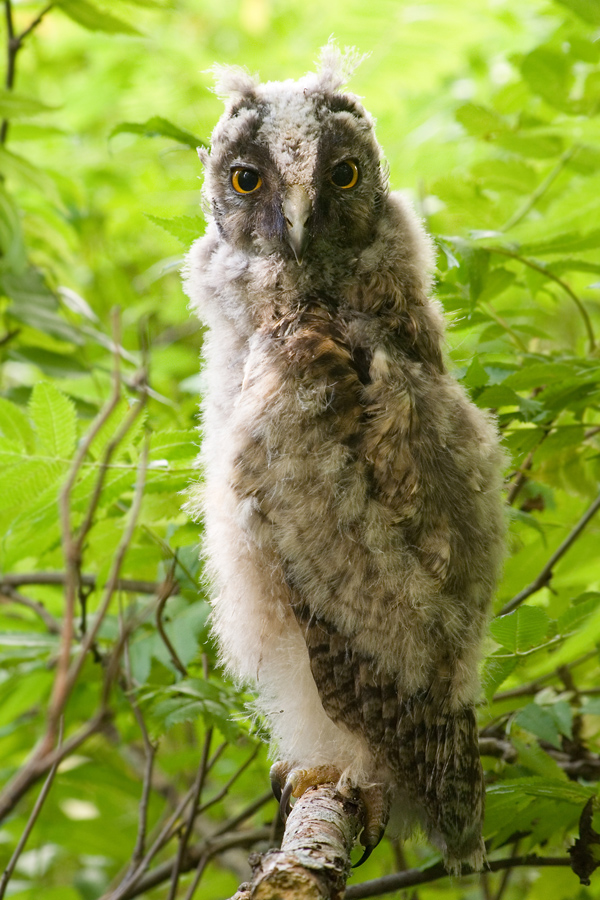
A young long-eared owl after it has moved to branches near the nest.

Long-eared owls tend to be monogamous breeders. Non-migratory populations are usually monogamous throughout the year, the pair bond being renewed annually. A study in Idaho determined that long-eared owls were locally extremely monogamous, with no extra-pair fertilizations were detected in 59 nestlings from 12 nests. There is a single record of a male breeding with 2 females in Netherlands, a very atypical case. Similarly, evidence of polyandry and alloparenting was found in a nest in western Montana where the four offspring of the female owl had two fathers, one of which was related to the female. Males claim their territory with singing and display flights with wing clapping. Singing normally starts at dusk on calm evenings and may continue through the night, clear windless moonlit nights are preferred. The song is usually delivered from a perch, most often at medium height in trees or from the upper half near the canopy, sometimes in flight. Males are responsive to playback during the period leading up to the breeding season (especially during courtship), to such a degree 45% territories would've been undetected in Spain if males has not responded to recordings (as opposed to listening for spontaneous callings). Often between 8 and 50 pairs are recorded in different parts of the range in a typical range of 100 km^{2} (39 sq mi). In Scotland, about 17% of the 9-18 pairs per 10 km^{2} (3.9 sq mi) were non-breeders. Typical territories for pairs are 50 to 100 ha (0.19 to 0.39 sq mi) in Finland when voles are plentiful. Several pairs may nest rather close together nonetheless. The minimal distance is normally around 50 to 150 m (160 to 490 ft) between active nests, but in Idaho a nearest nest distance of only 16 m (52 ft) was recorded. When food is abundant, about 10-12 pairs, infrequently as many as 50, may nest within area of 100 km^{2} (39 sq mi). Pairs may tolerate each other in the same patch of trees while nesting if food supplies are abundant. A study in Province of Pisa of Italy of 32 territories found 10-15 pairs per 100 km^{2} (39 sq mi) with a mean nest spacing of 1,727 m (5,666 ft). In a south-central Idaho study area, pair occurred on average 0.65 km (0.40 mi) apart. The highest densities may come from central Europe. The average density in central Europe is typically around 10-12 pairs per 100 km^{2} (39 sq mi). However, in Brandenburg, Germany, over a 24-year study, it was found the average density was 72.7 pairs per 100 km^{2} (39 sq mi). Based on studies from Michigan and Wyoming, anywhere from 10 to 100 pairs per 100 km^{2} (39 sq mi) was estimated, with the average range in Wyoming riparian habitat about 55 ha (0.21 sq mi). Densities appeared lower in the Snake River area (0.28-0.42 pairs per square km) than elsewhere in southern Idaho (0.64-1.55 pairs per square km). Globally, many pairs of long-eared owl occupy the same territory all year around but most prefer to use a different nest each year even if the same nest as last year is still in good standing. Females typically take on the duty of inspecting potential nesting sites and duets with its mate; perched on a chosen nest, she sings to contact the male, later vocal activity is confined to weak calls only heard at short range. During displays, females have also been recorded doing the wing clap display but much less intensely than males. Copulation tends to occur close to the nest. In Germany, it was recorded that the male precedes copulation with calls and display flights, followed by strong waving wing signals and tilting their body while perched near female and/or the nest. Copulation has also been observed on both the ground and the trees, preceded frequently by a duet, a male aerial display which ending in descent to ground and a flight by the female. Boundary fights between males are unrecorded in this species. Breeding occurs later in the year than sympatric species such as tawny owls and barn owls perhaps due to their more strongly migratory ways. Rarely mating may occur early as February in cooler temperate areas, but the pairs copulations usually take place in March or April. Winter breeding detected as new juveniles of 14–18 days of age were recorded in early February in Slovakia. Other prior reports of winter breeding are known from Italy, in two cases, as well as in the Czech Republic.

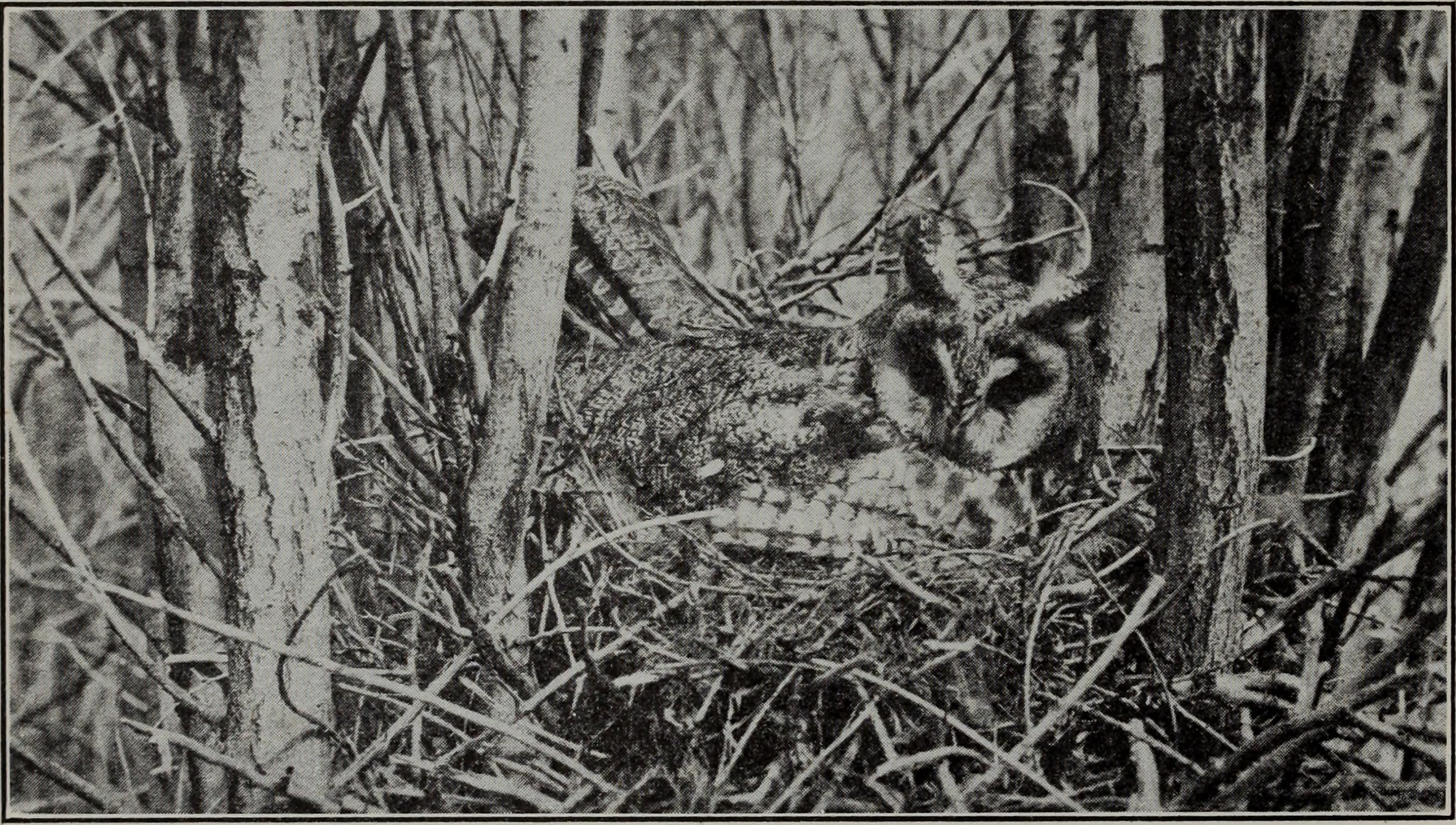
An old photo of a mother long-eared owl sitting on her nest.

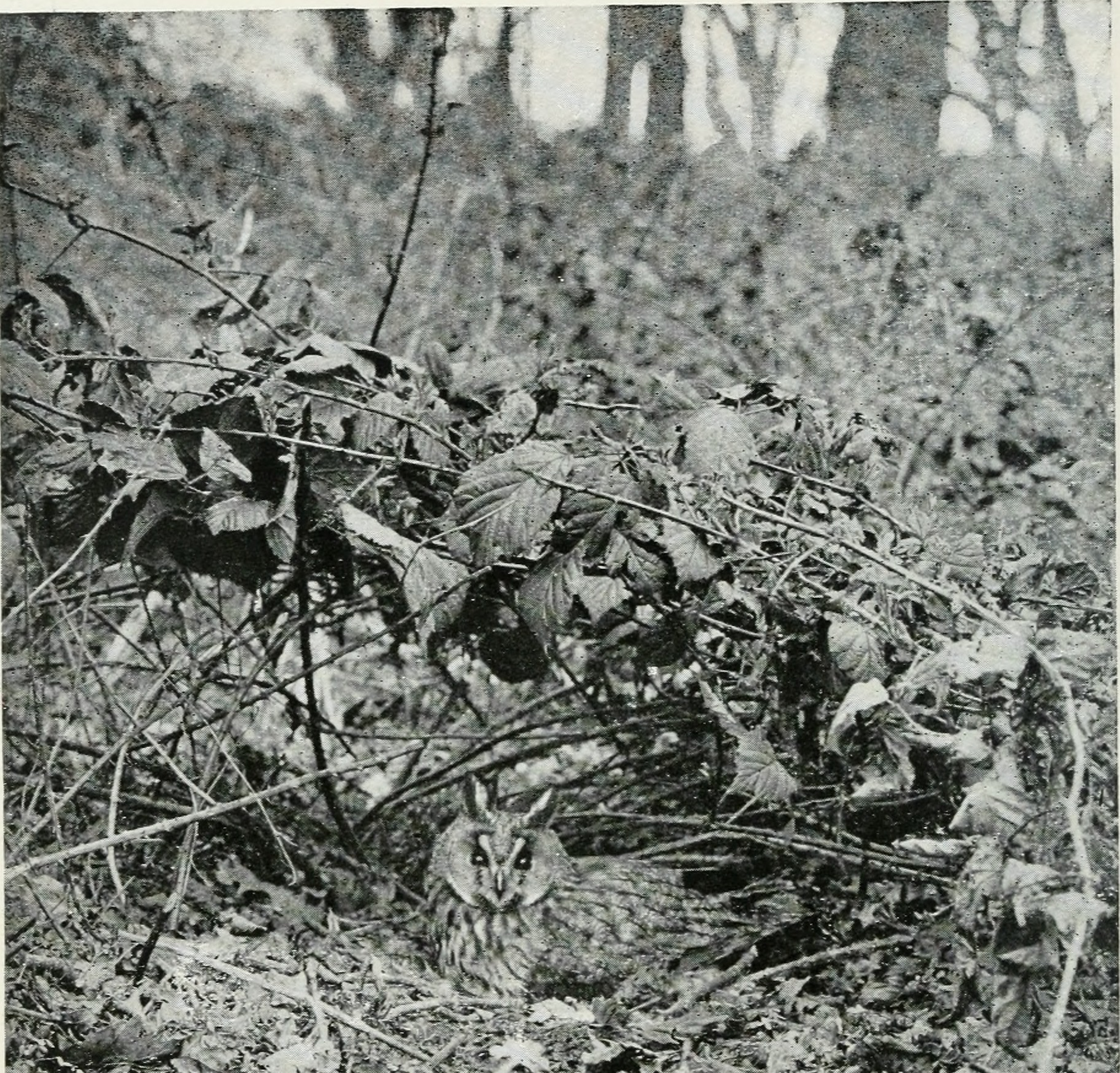
A picture of a rare ground nest in England.

Normally nests in stick nest of large birds, i.e. Corvus, Pica, raptors and Ardea herons. Other nest builders in Europe can often include common wood pigeons and Eurasian sparrowhawks. In Britain and Finland 84% of 239 and 85 nest were made by carrion (Corvus corone) or hooded crows (Corvus cornix) and Eurasian magpies. In England and Finland, 77% and 66% of the nest were in conifers, respectively. In Brandenburg, Germany, 90% of the nest were built by carrion crows and most were in Pinus sylvestris. In different studies of Idaho, nearly all known nests were in old corvid nests (most being in juniper). In one large study, nest heights, which averaged 3.2 m (10 ft), and diameter of the nest construction, which averaged 22.3 cm (8.8 in), were deemed likely to be the most significant criteria for nest selection. In Ontario, conifers were usually used, often Pinus or Juniperus, in corvid nests between 2.5 and 18.5 m (8.2 and 60.7 ft) high, but mostly between 5.5 and 9 m (18 and 30 ft). Nest height averaged 6.7 m (22 ft) in Great Britain. In Slovenia, long-eared owls preferred coniferous trees for breeding (in almost exclusively corvid nests), those that nested in deciduous trees had higher nest mortality especially earlier in the season due to higher predation rates. Similarly, nest site selection was largely correlated to predation risk in Spain, with ivy and tree canopy coverage less important than high scrub cover from below, in part because terrestrial predators were more common in the particular study area than aerial ones. In northeast Switzerland, nesting location are selected for anti-predator features, among 38 nesting sites, the ones seemingly preferred bore denser forest edges, greater canopy cover and were within conifers much more so than were prevalent in the overall environment, while the vicinities of buildings were avoided in the study area. An unusual case of urban breeding long-eared owls was observed in Moscow, Russia, where a loose colony was observed to form. The Moscow nesting was thought to be the result of synanthropization by the owls, in part due to lower predation risk in the urban areas versus rural vicinities (where predation was 6.6% higher). The mean distance of nesting owls in Moscow was 603 m (1,978 ft) whereas it was more than twice the distance in nearby rural areas. Tree nests are usually under 30 m (98 ft) above the ground, and can sometimes be so small that the wings and tail of brooding female may be visible from below. More infrequently than avian tree nests, leaf nests of tree squirrels, hawk nests in cacti and cliff nests of various birds may be used. While they usually take up already abandoned nest sites, sometimes long-eared owls are capable of chasing off prior occupant of nest even including other raptors (extending to fierce Accipiters such as sparrowhawks, sharp-shinned hawks and even larger Cooper's hawks) indicative of their potential for fierceness and tenacity. Other than other bird's nests, alternate nesting sites have been used but appear to be usually rare or uncommon. Among these, are shallow depressions on the ground. Some ground nest locations recorded (in Europe) have included among heather, bracken and bramble, and even on reed beds, rabbit warrens. Some nests have been recorded in wicker baskets placed in trees for ducks. In North America, pairs of ground nest were found in each west-central Montana and in Okavagan, British Columbia, in all cases between the roots of or the ground immediate adjacent to the base of trees or bushes (with two other historic records of ground nesting in North America). Artificial nesting platforms made of twigs for the owls are also locally accepted. In Woodwalton Fen reserve of eastern England, 71 nests were built in wicker baskets set out for owls. Also in Yizre'el in Israel, 6 of 16 nest baskets hung in Eucalyptus were used by long-eared owls, with all occupied by February. In this general area of Israel, at least 72 other nest baskets for long-eared owls have been set out, to encourage the rodent controlling birds. Exceptionally, long-eared owls have nested in shallow cavities, in hollow willows or oaks, tree stumps or holes in cliffsides, however as a rule they tend to not be cavity nesters. 6.5% of 153 nests in Great Britain were on natural surfaces (mostly the ground) rather than animal nests. Nesting vicinities where previous attempts were successful are more likely to be reused, i.e. in Idaho where 48% of prior nesting areas were reused after successful attempts.

Egg-laying is between normally between late March and early May in most of the range. Egg laying dates in the northeastern United States, in a sample of 42 eggs, were between March 14 and May 30. Additional records in southern Canada show laying as occurring at as late as June 5. 43 eggs in Ontario were laid between March 19 to May 24, more than half between April 15 and May 5. In northern Italy, the mean egg laying date was March 27. Exceptional eggs were recorded as early as December 31 to January 3 in Spain. Re-nesting can occur within about 20 days after a clutch is lost. In Europe up to two broods have been successfully been raised at times of food abundance. Generally the female lays 3-5 eggs (sometimes more if food is unusually abundant). Larger clutches are typical further north in the range. Record sized clutches have been recorded for Europe of up to 8 eggs in Sweden in years of a "vole plague" while record sized clutches worldwide were recorded of 10–11 in the Kazan area of Russia in similar conditions. In Great Britain, the average clutch size was recorded as 3.9 while in Germany it was 5.5 and, similarly, in Slovenia it was 5.6. In a study from Montana, the mean clutch size was 5. The pure white eggs are 40.2 mm × 32.5 mm (1.58 in × 1.28 in) on average in both North America and central Europe and weight about 23 g (0.81 oz). At 1-5 day intervals (on average 2), the eggs are laid on the bottom of nesting area. A clutch of 7 eggs takes 10 to 11 days to lay. Incubation begins with the first egg and continues for about 27–28 days (in extreme cases from about 21 to 30 days). The female alone incubates while the male provides food, which is brought direct to nest. She may leave the nest early on to feed but does so much less later into incubation. A study in Montana found that corticosterone levels were considerably higher in adults of both sexes during the breeding season than during the non-breeding season, suggesting that the breeding season is more stressful on the owls.

The young hatch at 2 day intervals at any point between very late April and June. The average weight of 52 hatchlings in Montana was 18.4 g (0.65 oz). Their eyes open at 5–7 days (averaging 6.4 days in Montana) and they are brooded by the mother for about 2 weeks, often while the male perches nearby and watches over. The female alone feeds the chicks. In Idaho, the male was recorded to 2.5 times more prey deliveries during nesting than did the female. Injury feigning displays have been recorded at the nestling stage as an anti-predation measure. Usually long-eared owls are less bold in nest defense than some other owls, Strix owls for example, but they are capable of fierce protective attack nonetheless. Nesting defense by parents increased in Italy further into breeding season, with older nestlings being defended more vigorously. Females do a majority of nest defenses. Owl pairs incurring higher levels of regular disturbance are more likely to have a milder nest defense. During a defensive display, the parent ruffles up their plumage and partially spreads the wings to half open, trampling from one foot to the other, hissing and bill snapping and can look surprisingly large in this posture. If a perceived threat continues towards the owls, they may leap up and try to rake and grab at the threat with their talons. Even animals as large as humans may find themselves the victim of long-eared owl defensive attacks if they approach or, especially, if they climb up to a nest. The young leave the nest at 20–27 days of age (average about 22 days) but are initially flightless, often climbing about surrounding branches. At this stage they may be referred to as "branchers". Quite often the young fall to the ground, but they are usually able to climb back up using their claws and bill with heavy wing flapping. At dusk the begging branchers call to their parents with high pitched notes to indicate their location. At about 35–37 days, they are fully fledged and can fly well, but they often follow their parents and are fed by them for up to about 2 months, continuing to make high pitched calls. In Slovenia, independence was gained about 50–80 days after hatching, while in Idaho it was about 45 to 56 days.

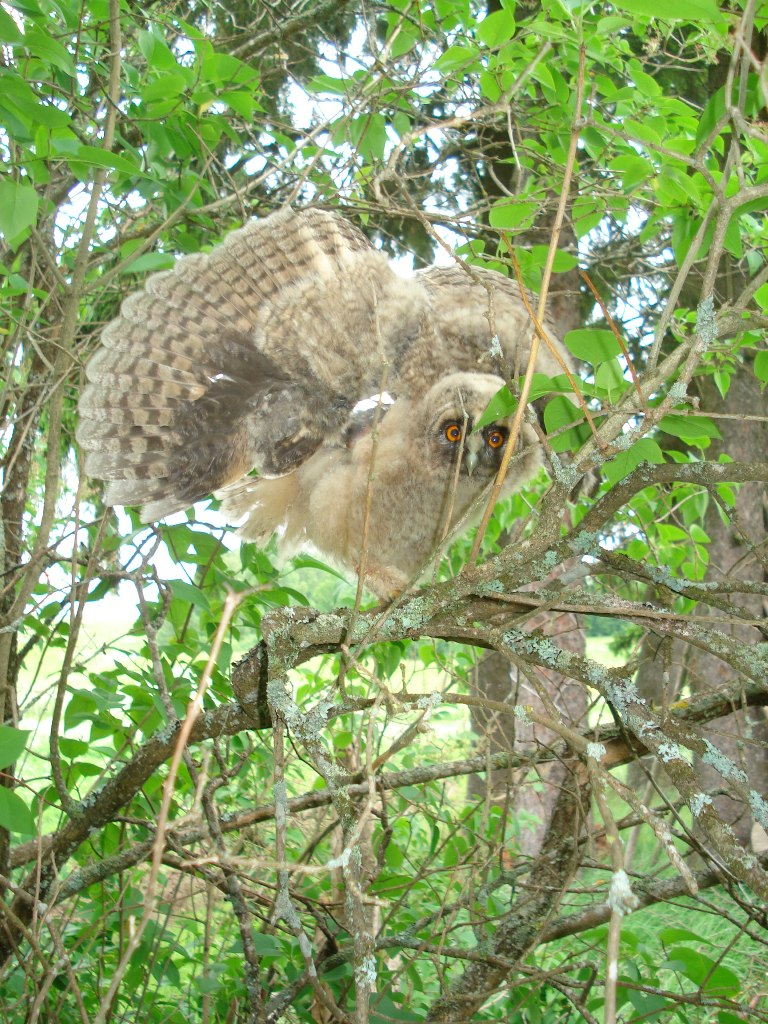
A young long-eared owl engaging in a threat display.

Normally in North America the species produces one clutch per year, but 2 clutches in a year have been recorded in high vole years. An exceptional double brood was recorded in Idaho due to high food availability, allowing the pair to successfully raise all 11 nestlings to fledgling, while in same season 3 other females in same grove were able to produce an average of 5.3 fledglings in their single broods. Like other species using open nests, rather than enclosed cavities, the species has relatively short fledging period and quickly moves away from the dangerous situation of the nest site. Nesting success averaged 46% between two study years in a study of 112 nests in Idaho with raccoon predation considered the most serious cause of nesting failure. A different Idaho study of 24 nests showed that the owls fledged an average of 3.7 young per nest. In Montana, the mean number hatched per nest was 3.8 and mean number to have fledged per nest was approximately 2.2. 59% of 78 nesting attempts failed in Britain, with an average clutch size per successful pair of 3.91 to 4.53. 41 of 78 continuously monitored in this British study nest successfully produced 1 or more fledglings. In another British study, of 58 monitored pairs over 4 years, 83% laid eggs, 63% hatched one or more young, and 57% fledged young, with an average of 3.2 young fledged per successful nest. In yet another English study, this time exclusively of owls using wicker baskets, 50.7% of 71 attempts managed to fledge young. Among the wicker basket users, earlier nesters (i.e. March-early April) raised larger broods and had more fledglings than later (late April-early May), in part due to rising water tables making prey capture less ideal later in nesting season. For 6 pairs of long-eared owls using wicker baskets in Israel, the mean brood size was 3.6 and mean number of young owls to leave the nest was 3. At all stages and in all regions, reproduction tends to be more successful when prey populations are higher. In continental Europe, conditions are better than in England or Finland, perhaps due to the large population of common voles there that are absent in the more northerly countries, and nesting success averages higher. However, breeding success still is reliant on prey populations. In an 15 km^{2} (5.8 sq mi) area of southern Germany, one cold spring with few voles no breeding pairs were found. A year later, with a warm spring and many voles, 19 breeding pairs took up residence in the study area. First year mortality of long-eared owls has been calculated in Germany as 52% and 31%. In Brandenburg, Germany, of 867 breeding attempts, 36.6% (335) pairs were successful in raising 1,468 young, which equates to 1.57 fledgling per all pairs that attempted, 4.31 per successful pair. The Brandenburg data shows that after 1990, when conservation minded farming initiative began, numbers increased significantly. Also in Brandenburg, in one case, 2 successive females to the same male were killed, the male mate was able to pair with a third female and resulting in a late successful fledging (August 24). In Slovenia, as studied between 1984 and 1993, of 79 nests, 32 (40%) produced young, 37 (47%) failed completely, and 10 (12%) failed after hatching. The Slovenian average number of owls hatched was 2.4 per nest (5.3 per successful nest) and the average number of owls fledged was 1.6 per nest (3.9 per successful nest). In Pisa, Italy, long-eared owl pairs produced a mean of 0.95 per territorial pair and 2.13 per successful pair. In central Slovenia, 57 nests produced an average of 5.7 eggs per clutch. Of the 51 fledged owls, 31 died in the study, 22 of which were due to mammal and bird predation, 6 due to starvation, 2 due to road collisions and 1 drowned in ditch. In Britain, the most common diagnosed cause of nest failure was egg theft by humans (accounting for 28.2% of 46 failed nests). Banding studies show that the long-eared owl typically have a short lifespan, with more than 91% of 105 owls recovered in North America of determined age being 4 years or younger. The oldest recorded in these efforts was banded in New York and recovered in Ontario at the age of 11 years and 4 months. Another one may have been over 15 years old, however. One exceptional isolated record is known of a European long-eared owl of just under 28 years of age. Annual survivorship in Germany and Switzerland for adults is 69%.

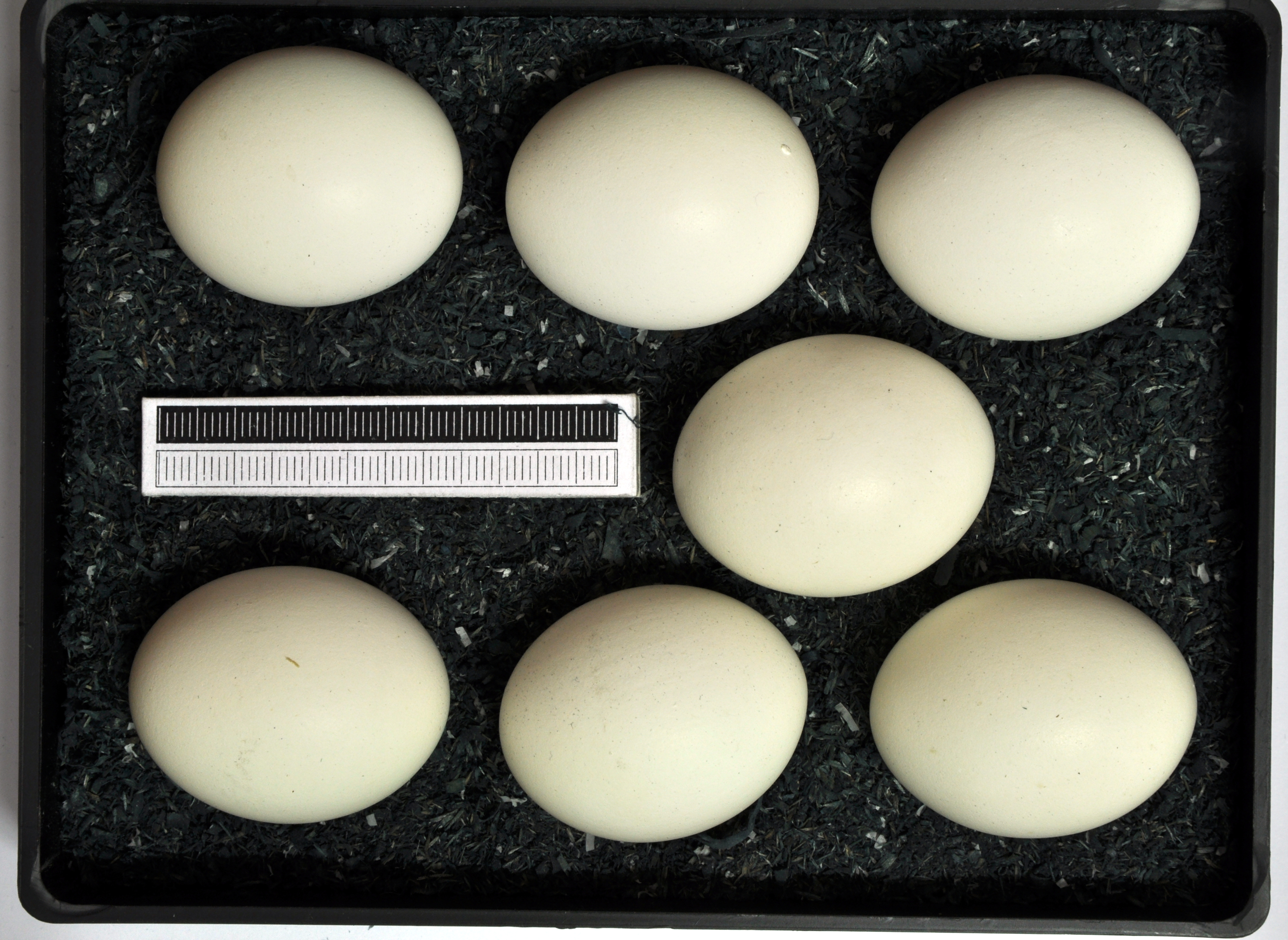
Eggs, Collection Museum Wiesbaden

== Status ==
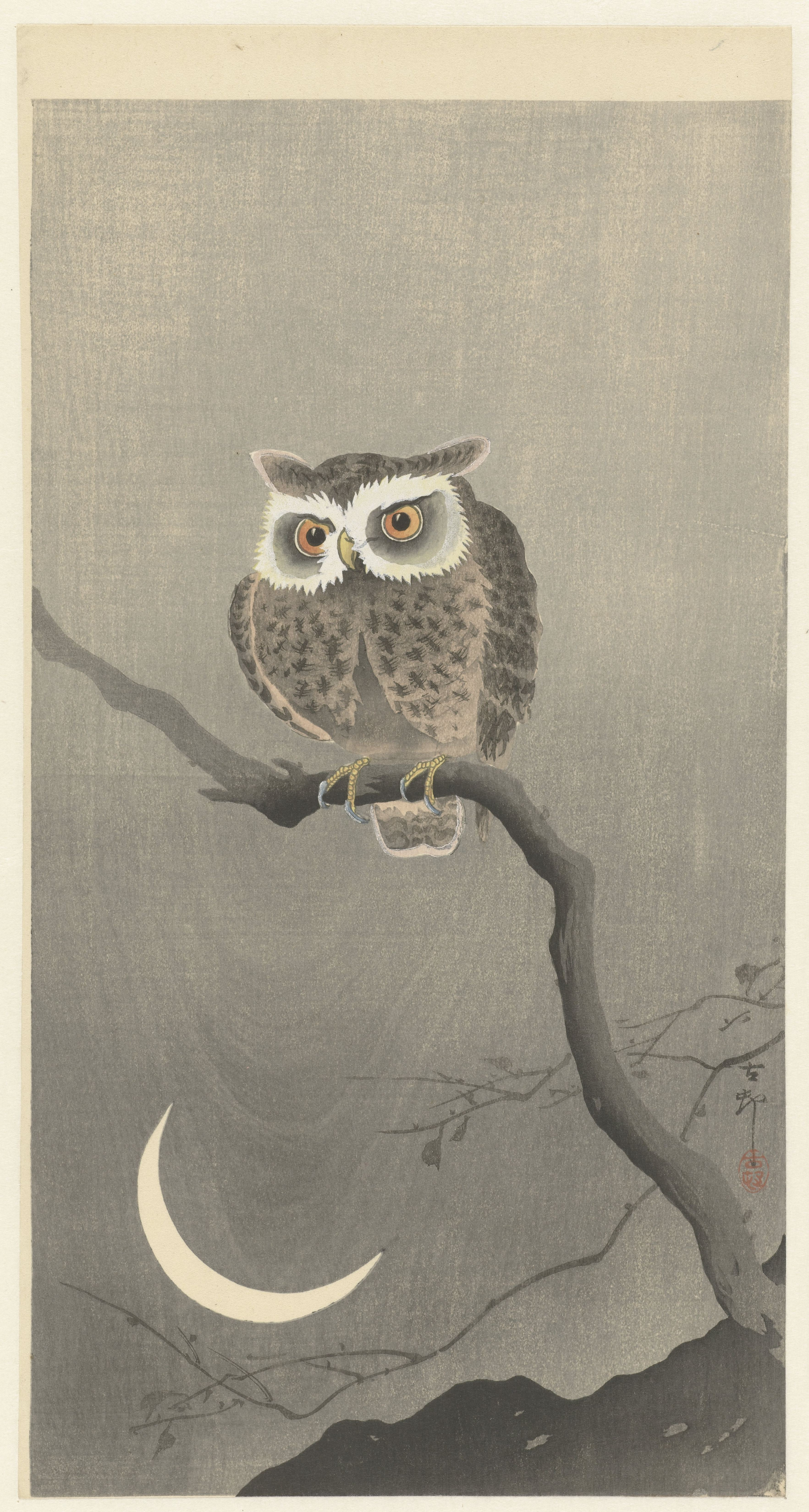
Long-eared Owl on a Bare Treebranch, print by Ohara Koson. Japan, 1900-1930

The long-eared owl is common and widespread in many regions. With a range of 80 million square kilometers, it is one of the most widespread owls. The IUCN estimates the total population between 2 million and 5.5 million, placing it as one of the most numerous owls other than the wider ranging barn owl and less wide-ranging little owl (both likely between 5 and 10 million total birds) and roughly equaling the total population of great horned owls. The long-eared owl is more numerous than its scarce but more wide-ranging cousin, the short-eared owl. Their range of limit for breeding is typically in Mediterranean type arid, hot climates, where terrestrial insects and reptiles may prevail over small, sociable rodents, the long-eared owl is cut-off, whereas these are peak areas for barn owls. In the north, it is scarce to absent in areas of the deep boreal forest and the treeless northern areas such as around large wetland bogs or lower tundra, where the short-eared owl tends to supplant them. Densities of populations depend on availability of food. Local threats are typically pesticides and persecution. Out of myth and ignorance, this species has long been persecuted by humans. In many areas, some may carelessly shoot at any crow-like nest in order to destroy the contents, out of resentment for the crow's perception as a pest. In North America, hunters shot long-eared owls as all owls were badly persecuted. Even though it was perceived early in the 20th century that the species is actually beneficial to human interests, many hunters continued to shoot them, claiming that they represent young individuals of the then nationally despised great horned owl. Largely in correlation with persecution, long-eared owls were recorded as formerly abundant and then rare in North America in the early 20th century. Long-eared owls potentially face lethal contamination with heavy metals such as mercury, organic biocides, including insecticides, fungicides and rodenticides and PCBs recorded. Pesticides seem to affect the species less than those predators with more varied diets and those that eat carrion. High levels of contamination were found in long-eared owl pellets in Serbia, with the concentrations of pollutants in prey that are sourced from industrial and agricultural practices in the region. Like many birds, they may be vulnerable to helminths, which are probably underrated as a potential source of mortality. Other parasites and mites may reduce health of populations. West Nile virus and Salmonella have been the recorded source of mortality for some long-eared owls. Anticoagulants may also threaten this species. In the Canary islands, it has become increasingly scarce due to loss of habitat. Many long-eared owls are also killed by road traffic. High owl mortality was particularly noted along roadways in France, especially due to common vole being numerous in roadside areas. It was proposed that letting vegetation grow may mitigate some mortalities. During 1963–1995, of 128 dead long-eared owls found in England, 89 were females and 34 were males; 61% turned had died from collisions (40% from those with vehicles). In this study from England, high levels of DDE (metabolite of DDT) and HEOD found in long-eared owls prior to 1977, similar levels to those seen in falcons there, lessened in later samples but 2 birds still had fatal levels of pesticide contamination. In areas such as Switzerland, to offset persecution and increase survival as well as to allow observers to watch them more easily, wintering owls in towns and cities were fed daily white lab mice. Breeding can be promoted by artificial platforms of twigs in bushes or trees. Also augmented feeding may ensure survival during low food winters. An attempt to release captive raised long-eared owls in the wild in Italy was largely unsuccessful. Of these, 3 of 8 owls seemed to disperse successfully while the others died or disappeared, while 8 tawny owls released all but 1 seemed to successfully disperse. The species has actually increased in Iran, rising from 25 records over 12 decades to 49 records in two decades (between late 70s and 1997). Breeding was confirmed in up to 12 regions for the Persian breeding population and between 1997 and 2014 there were 32 non-breeding and 17 breeding records.

In southern California (San Diego county and Orange county), long-eared owls are thought to have lost more than 55% of their range due to habitat alterations. A decreasing trend has been observed in wintering owls in New Jersey, with 9 of 58 known roosts eliminated due to land development, while the remaining 49 have shown reductions or are no longer used over the course of 30 years. Land use changes and habitat destruction accounts for reduced habitat quality and lower vole populations, with more adaptable raptors such as great horned owls and hawks exploiting much of what remains to the detriment of long-eared owls. A similar reduction was noted over 20 years in Pennsylvania. Broader studies of banding across Canada, gathered during long-term monitoring from consistent annual bird counts from 1966 to 1992, showed that long-eared owls have declined relatively significantly. A net total 0.98% decline was recorded over the survey time. This was considered the second greatest reduction behind short-eared owl and burrowing owl (Athene cunicularia). Furthermore, among the 19 raptors surveyed in Canada, these 3 owls showed the most declining trends. The long-eared owl was apparently the most scarce of the 6 sub-boreal owl species surveyed. A similar trend has been detected throughout North America with a very large net 1.6% reduction overall during Christmas Bird Counts (CBC), again making it the most severe decline for an owl behind only the short-eared owl and the two related owl species seemed to have had the most severe declines of all 28 raptor species mentioned in these CBC surveys.

== In art ==
John James Audubon illustrated the "Long-eared Owl - Strix otus" as Plate 383 in Birds of America, published London, 1827–38. The print was engraved by Robert Havell in 1837. The original watercolour was purchased from Audubon's destitute widow by The New York History Society.
