= Pato Banton =

British reggae musician

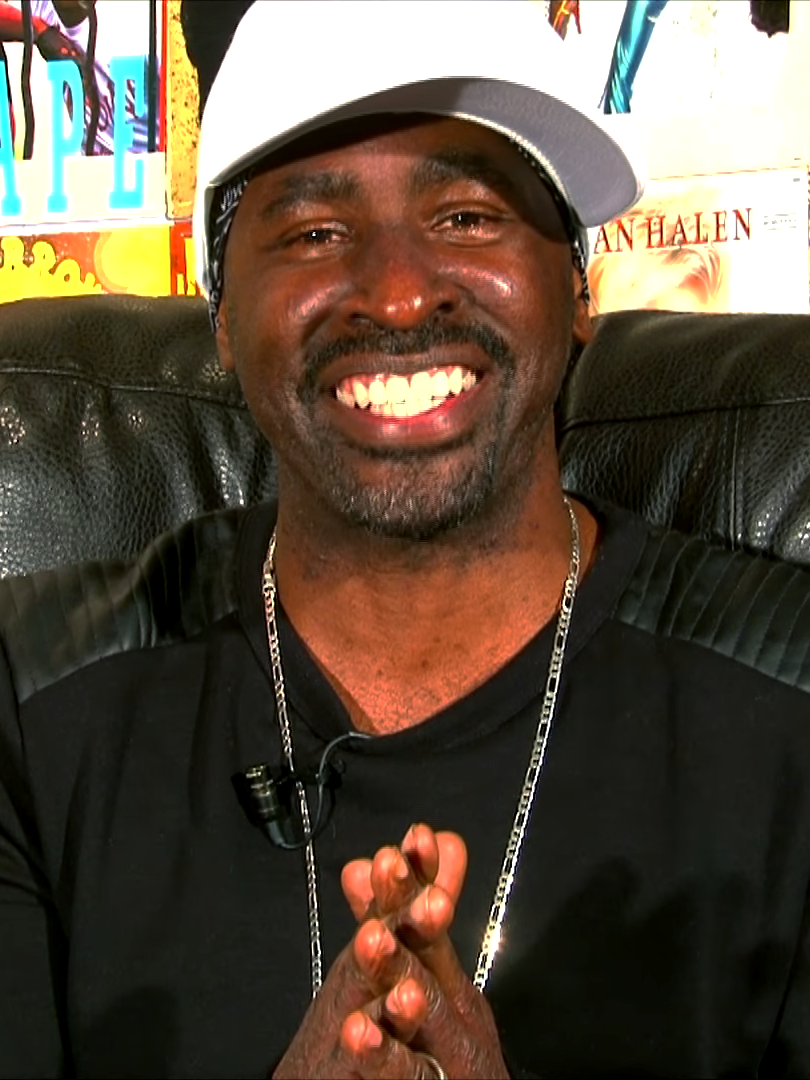
- Banton in 2015

Background information
- Born: Patrick Murray; 28 January 1961 (age 65); Brixton, London, England
- Origin: Birmingham, England
- Genres: Reggae
- Instrument: Vocals
- Years active: 1980s–present
- Labels: Fashion; Ariwa; IRS; Go-Feet
- Website: officialpatobanton.com

Pato Banton (born Patrick Murray; 28 January 1961) is a reggae singer and toaster from Birmingham, England. He received the nickname Pato Banton from his stepfather: his first name Pato is derived from the Jamaican owl's "patoo, patoo" call, while his second name is the DJ slang word "banton", which means heavyweight lyricist or storyteller. In 1994, he achieved a number 1 on the UK Singles Chart with a cover of The Equals' "Baby, Come Back", featuring Robin and Ali Campbell of UB40.

== Biography ==
Banton first came to public attention in the early 1980s when he worked with The Beat. He recorded "Pato and Roger a Go Talk" with Ranking Roger, included on the 1982 album Special Beat Service. He went on to record a series of singles for Fashion Records and Don Christie Records. He was among the guest artists appearing on the 1985 UB40 album Baggariddim. His debut single "Hello Tosh" featured a parody on a well-known jingle. Banton's debut album was the 1985, Mad Professor-produced Mad Professor Captures Pato Banton, followed in 1987 by Never Give In, which included a collaboration with Paul Shaffer and a follow-up to his earlier collaboration with Ranking Roger with "Pato and Roger Come Again". After an EP in 1988, Banton released a more pop-oriented LP, Visions of the World, followed by 1990's Wize Up! (No Compromise), which included a college radio hit in Spirits in the Material World (The Police cover) and another collaboration, "Wize Up!", this time with David Hinds of Steel Pulse.

Banton then worked on a live album with Mad Professor, and then released 1992's Universal Love. The album featured a song covered by Banton called "United We Stand", which was written by fellow Birmingham musician Ray Watts, of the group Beshara. After a 1994 British number one hit with "Baby Come Back" (originally by Eddy Grant performing with The Equals) with Robin and Ali Campbell of UB40, a best-of album was released, and Banton was invited by Sting to join him on his "This Cowboy Song" single. His collaboration with Reggae Revolution on a reinterpolation of the Young Rascals single "Groovin'" reached number 14 on the UK Singles Chart in July and became a major hit in New Zealand, reaching number four on the RIANZ Singles Chart and staying in the top 20 for nine weeks. It was the country's 47th best-selling single of the year, received a Gold sales certification for selling over 5,000 copies, and was featured on the soundtrack of the 1996 film Kazaam and 1998 hit Disney remake The Parent Trap. 1996's Stay Positive, credited to Pato Banton & The Reggae Revolution, was followed by Life Is a Miracle in 2000. Life Is a Miracle received a Grammy nomination for Best Reggae Album in the 2001 Grammy Awards.

== Discography ==
- Mad Professor Captures Pato Banton (1985)
- Never Give In (1987)
- Visions of the World (1989)
- Mad Professor Recaptures Pato Banton (1990)
- Wize Up! (No Compromize) (1990)
- Live & Kickin All Over America (1991)
- Universal Love (1992)
- Collections (1994)
- Stay Positive (1996)
- Time Come (1999)
- Tudo De Bom - Live in Brazil (2000)
- Life Is a Miracle (2000)
- Live at the Maritime - San Francisco (2001)
- The Best of Pato Banton (2002)
- Positive Vibrations (2007)
- Pato Banton and Friends (2008)
- Destination Paradise (2008)

Singles with UK Singles Charts positions Baby Come Back No. 1 (1994) This Cowboy Song No. 15 (1995) * Sting (feat Pato Banton) Bubblin' Hot No. 15 (1995) Spirits in the Material World No. 36 (1996) Groovin' No. 14 (1996)

== Filmography ==
- Lycanthropy (2006)
