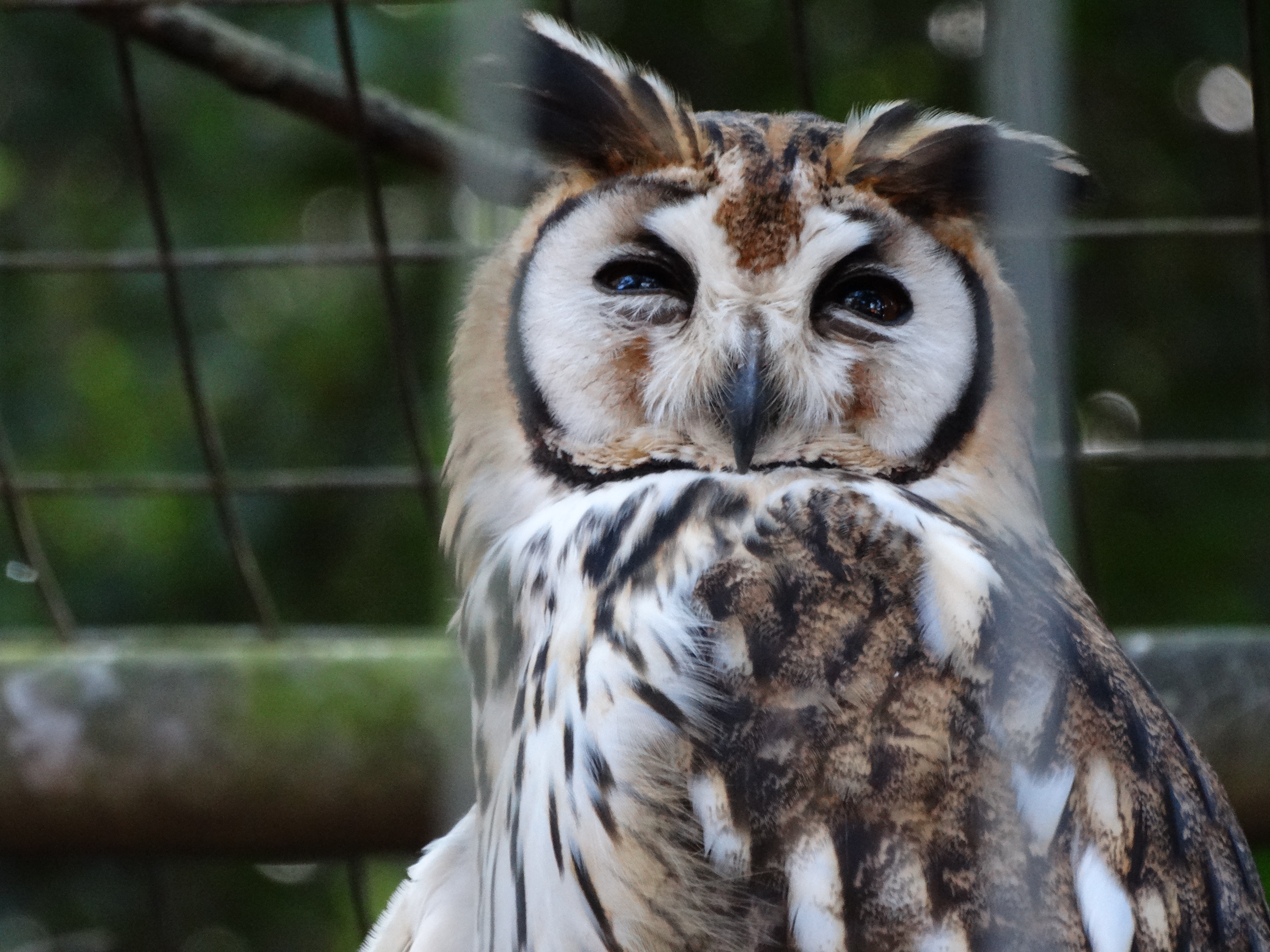

Conservation status
- Least Concern (IUCN 3.1)
- CITES Appendix II

Scientific classification
- Kingdom: Animalia
- Phylum: Chordata
- Class: Aves
- Order: Strigiformes
- Family: Strigidae
- Genus: Asio
- Species: A. clamator

Binomial name
- Asio clamator (Vieillot, 1808)

Synonyms
- Pseudoscops clamator Rhinoptynx clamator

= Striped owl =

Species of owl

The striped owl (Asio clamator) is a medium-sized owl with large ear tufts and a brownish-white facial disk rimmed with black. Its beak is black, and it has cinnamon-colored eyes. It has shorter, rounder wings than most of its close relatives. The upperparts are cinnamon with fine black vermiculation and heavy stripes. The underparts are pale tawny with dusky streaks. It is native to South America and parts of Central America.

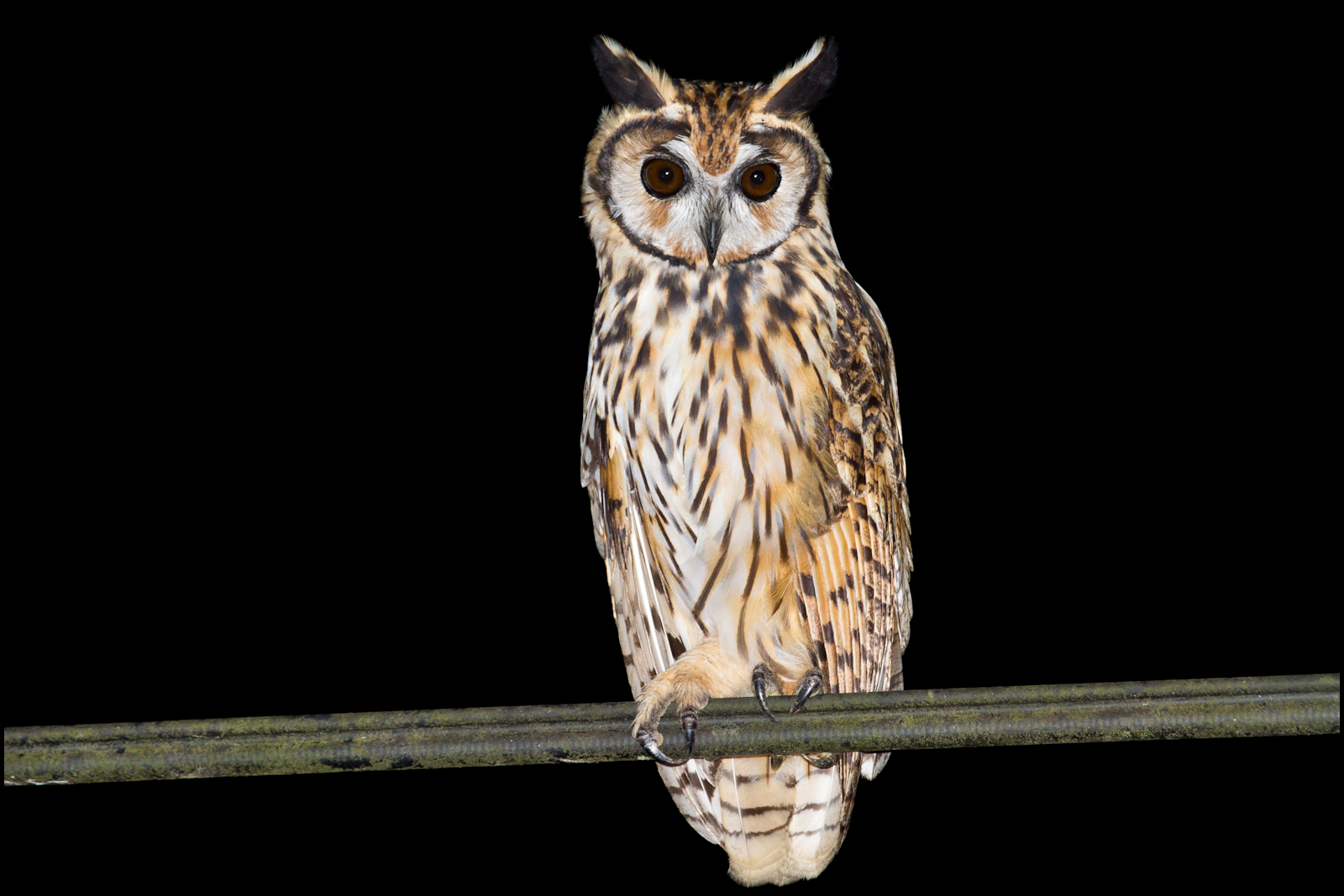
Striped owl

== Taxonomy ==
The striped owl was formally described by the French ornithologist Louis Pierre Vieillot in 1808 under the binomial name Bubo clamator. The specific epithet clamator is Latin meaning "shouter". The type locality is Cayenne in French Guiana. The striped owl was at one time placed in its own genus Rhinoptynx and was then transferred to the genus Pseudoscops. A molecular study that compared mitochondrial DNA sequences indicated that it should be placed in the genus Asio. This result was confirmed by a large molecular phylogenetic study of the owls published in 2019.

== Description ==
The striped owl is a relatively large species with prominent tufts of elongated feathers on the crown resembling ears. It is 30–38 cm (12–15 in) long and weighs from 320 to 546 g (11.3 to 19.3 oz). Its head, back, wings and tail are brown with black stripes and small markings while its underparts are buff-coloured with heavy black streaking on the breast. The facial disk is pure white with a thin black border.

== Distribution and habitat ==
The striped owl is native to much of South and Central America. Its range is not well known, perhaps because it is nocturnal and not easily seen, but it is known from Argentina, Belize, Bolivia, Brazil, Colombia, Costa Rica, Ecuador, El Salvador, French Guiana, Guatemala, Guyana, Honduras, Mexico, Nicaragua, Panama, Paraguay, Peru, Suriname, Tobago, Uruguay and Venezuela. It uses a variety of habitats, including riparian woodlands, marshes, savannahs, grassy open areas, and tropical rainforests. It can be found from sea level to an altitude of 1,400 m (4,600 ft) and above.

== Conservation status ==
The striped owl has a very large range and population. As of 2021, while this population is believed to be decreasing, it numbers an estimated 500,000 – 5.0 million individuals. It faces no particular threats and is classified by the IUCN as least concern.
