= Never Give In =

Never Give In may refer to:

== Albums ==
- Never Give In (Pato Banton album), 1987
- Never Give In (Will Hoge album), 2013
- Never Give In!, a 2014 album by Razors in the Night
- Never Give In: A Tribute to Bad Brains, a Bad Brains tribute album featuring Will Haven and Moby

== Songs ==
- "Never Give In", a song by Biohazard from the album Reborn in Defiance
- "Never Give In", a song by Black Veil Brides from the album We Stitch These Wounds
- "Never Give In", a 1982 song by Dogsflesh
- "Never Give In", a song by Oi Polloi from the album Fight Back!
- "Never Give In", a song by The Streets from the album Everything Is Borrowed
- "Never Give In", a 2014 song by Mackintosh Braun
- "Never Give In", a song by Skinlab from the album ReVoltingRoom
- "Never Give In", a song by Luna Mortis from the album The Absence
- "Never Give In", a song by Ensign from the album Cast the First Stone
- "Never Give In", a 1980 song by Jay Delmore

== TV shows ==
- Sir Alex Ferguson: Never Give In, a 2021 British documentary film about the football manager Sir Alex Ferguson
