= Ray Watts =

Ray Watts may refer to:

- Ray Watts (footballer) (1917–2008), Australian rules footballer
- Ray Watts (singer) (1957–2000), reggae singer and songwriter
- Ray L. Watts (born 1953), president of the University of Alabama at Birmingham
- Ray E. Watts (1895–1969), American football, basketball and baseball coach
