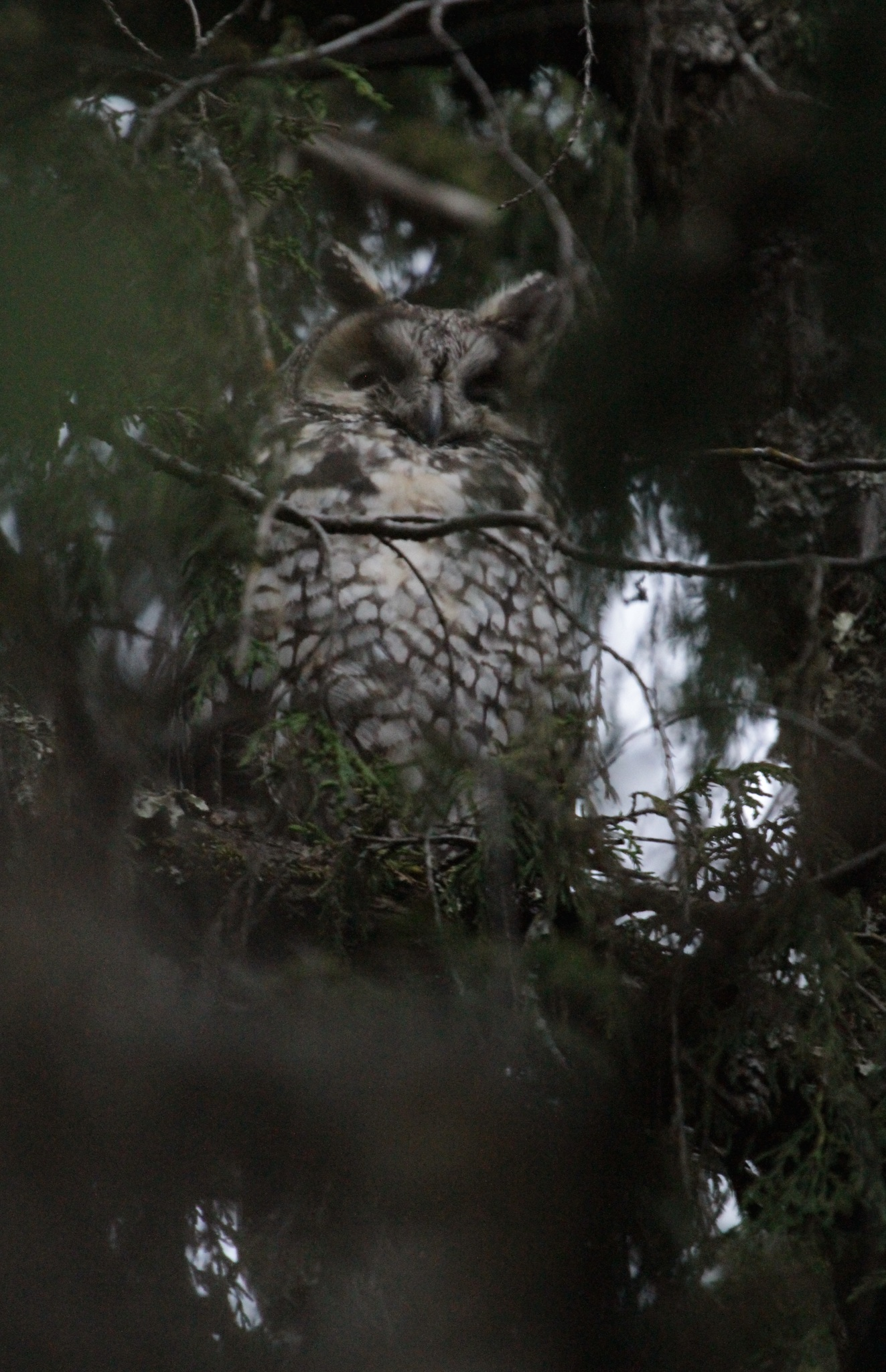

Conservation status
- Least Concern (IUCN 3.1)
- CITES Appendix II

Scientific classification
- Kingdom: Animalia
- Phylum: Chordata
- Class: Aves
- Order: Strigiformes
- Family: Strigidae
- Genus: Asio
- Species: A. abyssinicus

Binomial name
- Asio abyssinicus (Guérin-Méneville, 1843)

= Abyssinian owl =

Species of owl

The Abyssinian owl or African long-eared owl (Asio abyssinicus) is a non-migratory, terrestrial, medium-sized true owl. Due to their status as a protected species of least concern, they cannot legally be hunted in most of the territory that they inhabit.

== Description ==
The Abyssinian owl has dark brown eyes, a black bill and gray eyebrows. It is similar in appearance to the long-eared owl, Asio otus, but their ranges do not overlap, and the Abyssinian owl is darker. It has prominent dark brown, white-edged ear-tufts that are slightly centrally located on the head.

The length of the Abyssinian owl can range from 40–44 cm, with a tail length of 182-190mm and a wing length of 309-360mm. Its weight falls between 245-500g.

== Behavior and reproduction ==
Asio abyssinicus is a nocturnal owl. It uses the nests of other birds to raise its offspring. The claws of the Abyssinian owl are significantly stronger than other members of the genus; as a result a wider range of prey is available, including smaller insects and birds, field mice, and shrews.

== Distribution ==
The Abyssinian owl prefers open grasslands or moorlands with oak or cedar forests, and it is found in mountain valleys and gorges at elevations of up to 2,900 meters (9,514 feet) a.s.l. It lives in the Albertine Rift montane forests, Democratic Republic of Congo, Ethiopia, central Kenya, and Western Uganda. This species is classified as least concern by IUCN due to its very large range. However, the species is described as "rare to scarce" when seeking to identify one.

The Abyssinian owl is completely residential to the areas it inhabits due to the distinct environment and altitude it prefers. It does not migrate.
