= Asio ecuadoriensis =

Asio ecuadoriensis Temporal range: Pleistocene (Lujanian) ~0.04 Ma

Scientific classification
- Kingdom: Animalia
- Phylum: Chordata
- Class: Aves
- Order: Strigiformes
- Family: Strigidae
- Genus: Asio
- Species: †A. ecuadoriensis

Binomial name
- †Asio ecuadoriensis (Lo Coco et al., 2020)

Extinct species of owl

Asio ecuadoriensis is an extinct species of eared owl from the Pleistocene of Ecuador. Known from bones of the legs, it was a robust predatory bird similar in size to the great horned owl. Based on the robustness of its limbs and the bones found in what may have been its burrow, it's possible that it may have been specialised in hunting other species of owls.

== Discovery and naming ==
The holotype specimen of A. ecuadoriensis was discovered between 2009 and 2012 in the ravines of Quebrada Chalán, an area in the Ecuadorian Andes, south of Riobamba City. The fossil site seems to preserve the burrow of an owl, containing the fossil bones of several owls as well as the bones of various small mammals. These specimens are associated with the Late Pleistocene Cangahua Formation. The holotype consists of two fossils that form a portion of the leg, specifically part of the tibiotarsus and an almost complete tarsometatarsus. Unlike other specimens from the locality, the bones of A. ecuadoriensis lack any form of abrasion related to stomach acid. The animal was named by Gastón E. Lo Coco and colleagues in 2020 after the country it was found in.

== Description ==
A. ecuadoriensis may have been the largest known asionine with the known material being similar in size to those of large female great horned owls. The preserved length of the tibiotarsus is 81.6 mm (3.21 in) and the tarsometatarsus is 65.2 mm (2.57 in) and both bones are relatively robust. Although its size is similar to the great horned owl, it appears notably more slender by comparison. The material indicates that A. ecuadoriensis had legs that were longer and more robust than those of any other known asionine owl and, as inferred based on the size of the intercondylar groove, was very powerful. This robustness correlates with deep muscle scars, further supporting the idea that this species had a strong grip. Standing up they may have reached a height of 70 cm (2.3 ft) and a wingspan of 1.50 m (4.9 ft).

== Paleobiology ==
=== Diet ===
The peculiar limb morphology of A. ecuadoriensis suggests that it had robust and strong limbs well suited to grip prey and restrain it while it struggled. All other material found at the burrow locality, including those of other owl species, shows the signs of erosion caused by strigiform stomach acid, subsequently suggesting that the bones found at the site had been ingested by a large species of owl that likely inhabited the burrow. As the bones of Asio ecuadoriensis are the only ones not showing such signs of erosion, it is very likely that it is the owner of the burrow and by extension fed on the animals whose bones were recovered alongside it. Mammal bones found in the burrow included Cryptotis shrews, rabbits and cricetid rodents, while other owls are represented by the bones of the American barn owl, the burrowing owl and an indeterminate species of pygmy owl. The abundance of owl remains suggests the possibility that Asio ecuarodiensis may have been an owl specialist, or at least heavily incorporated other owl species in its diet alongside mammalian prey.

=== Extinction ===
American owl diversity during the Pleistocene was notably higher than today, including various large-sized species found in continental North and South America as well as insular species like those of the Antilles, which coincided with an increased diversity in condors, caracaras and other raptors. One cause for this diversity may be widespread aridification during this time, replacing forested areas with wide open landscapes offering abundant food sources for birds of prey. Although the disappearance of the latter can be linked to the extinction of the American megafauna, the disappearance of giant non-scavenging birds is more difficult to explain. One hypothesis states that these large, specialised taxa were deeply affected by the selective pressures following the Pleistocene extinctions and disappeared relatively quickly, in part due to their smaller population density compared to smaller forms.
