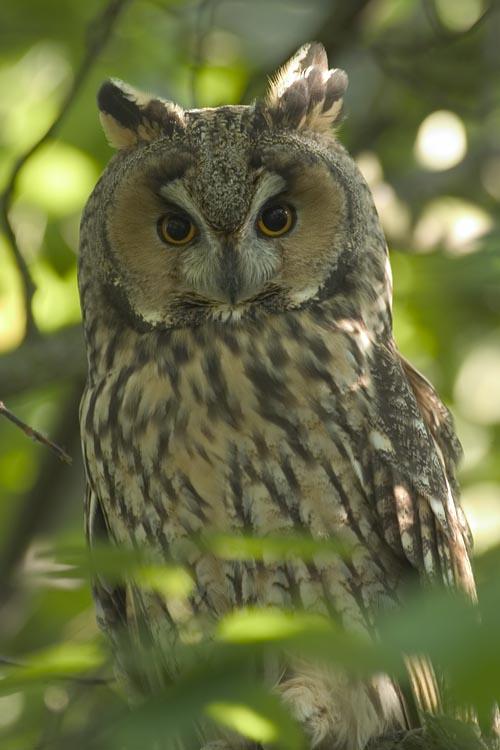
- Long-eared owl

Scientific classification
- Kingdom: Animalia
- Phylum: Chordata
- Class: Aves
- Order: Strigiformes
- Family: Strigidae
- Genus: Asio; Brisson, 1760

Type species
- Strix otus Linnaeus, 1758

Species
- A, grammicus (some place in Pseudoscops); A. clamator (some place in Pseudoscops or Rhinoptynx); A. otus A. abyssinicus A. madagascariensis A. stygius A. flammeus A. capensis A. solomonensis

= Asio =

Asio Temporal range: Late Pliocene to present

Genus of birds

Asio is a genus of typical owls, or true owls, in the family Strigidae. This group has representatives over most of the planet, and the short-eared owl is one of the most widespread of all bird species, breeding in Europe, Asia, North and South America, the Caribbean, Hawaii and the Galápagos Islands. Its geographic range extends to all continents except Antarctica and Australia.

These are medium-sized owls, 30–46 cm (12–18 in) in length with 80–103 cm (31–41 in) wingspans. They are long-winged and have the characteristic facial disc. The two northern species are partially migratory, moving south in winter from the northern parts of their range, or wandering nomadically in poor vole years in search of better food supplies. Tropical Asio owls are largely sedentary. These owls hunt over open fields or grasslands, taking mainly rodents, other small mammals and some birds.

Asio owls are mainly nocturnal, but short-eared owls are also crepuscular. Most species nest on the ground, but the long-eared owl (Asio otus) nests in the old stick nests of crows, ravens and magpies (family Corvidae) and various hawks.

== Taxonomy ==
The genus Asio was introduced by the French zoologist Mathurin Jacques Brisson in 1760 with the long-eared owl (Asio otus) as the type species. The genus name is from asiō, the Latin name used by Pliny the Younger for a type of horned owl, the feather tufts on the head of these owls give the appearance of "ears" which is a defining characteristic.

== Species ==
The genus contains the following nine species:

Genus Asio – Brisson, 1760 – nine species
Common name	Scientific name and subspecies	Range	Size and ecology	IUCN status and estimated population
Jamaican owl	Asio grammicus (Gosse, 1847)	Jamaica	Size: Habitat: Diet:	LC
Striped owl	Asio clamator (Vieillot, 1808)	South America and parts of Central America.	Size: Habitat: Diet:	LC
Long-eared owl	Asio otus (Linnaeus, 1758) Four subspecies: A. o. otus (Linnaeus, 1758); A. o. canariensis (Madarász, 1901); A. o. wilsonianus (Lesson, 1830); A. o. tuftsi Godfrey, 1948	Map of range	Size: Habitat: Diet:	LC
Abyssinian owl	Asio abyssinicus (Guérin-Méneville, 1843)	Ethiopia and northern Kenya.	Size: Habitat: Diet:	LC
Madagascar owl	Asio madagascariensis (A. Smith, 1834)	Madagascar	Size: Habitat: Diet:	LC
Stygian owl	Asio stygius (Wagler, 1832) Six subspecies: A. s. lambi Moore, RT (1937); A. s. robustus Kelso, L (1934); A. s. siguapa d'Orbigny (1839); A. s. noctipetens Riley (1916); A. s. stygius Wagler (1832); A. s. barberoi Bertoni, AW (1930)	Mexico, parts of Central America, Cuba, Hispaniola, and 10 countries in South America.	Size: Habitat: Diet:	LC
Short-eared owl	Asio flammeus (Pontoppidan, 1763) Eleven subspecies: A. f. flammeus – (Pontoppidan, 1763); A. f. cubensis – Garrido, 2007; A. f. domingensis – (Statius Müller, 1776); A. f. portoricensis – Ridgway, 1882; A. f. bogotensis – Chapman, 1915; A. f. galapagoensis – (Gould, 1837); A. f. pallidicaudus – Friedmann, 1949; A. f. suinda – (Vieillot, 1817); A. f. sanfordi – Bangs, 1919; A. f. sandwichensis – (A. Bloxam, 1827); A. f. ponapensis – Mayr, 1933	all continents except Antarctica and Australia	Size: Habitat: Diet:	LC
Marsh owl	Asio capensis (Smith, 1834)	southern Africa	Size: Habitat: Diet:	LC
Fearful owl	Asio solomonensis (Hartert, 1901)	Solomon Islands archipelago	Size: Habitat: Diet:	VU

Four fossil species are recognized:

- † Asio brevipes (Glenns Ferry Late Pliocene of Hagerman, USA)
- † Asio priscus (Late Pleistocene of San Miguel Island and Santa Rosa Island, USA)
- † Asio ecuadoriensis (Late Pleistocene of Ecuador)
- † Asio pythiotus (Pleistocene of Crimea)

The supposed Late Eocene/Early Oligocene eared owl "Asio" henrici has been recognized as a member of the fossil barn-owl genus Selenornis. "Asio" pygmaeus (often misspelt pigmaeus) cannot be assigned to a genus without restudy of the material. "Asio" collongensis (Middle Miocene of Vieux-Collonges, France) is now placed in the genus Alasio.
