= Visions of the World =

Studio album by Pato Banton
- Released: 1989
- Genre: Pop reggae
- Label: I.R.S.
- Producer: Pato Banton, G. T. Haynes

Pato Banton chronology
| Never Give In (1987) | Visions of the World (1989) | Mad Professor Recaptures Pato Banton (1990) |

Visions of the World is an album by the English musician Pato Banton, released in 1989. He supported it with a North American tour, backed by his band, the Studio Two Crew.

== Production ==
Banton added pop and soul styles to his traditional reggae sound; he also chose to include songs with more serious lyrical themes. "Pressure" criticizes Prime Minister Margaret Thatcher's fiscal decisions. "Pato's Opinion Pt. 2" calls out the apartheid policies of P. W. Botha and closes with a quote from Burt Bacharach's "What the World Needs Now Is Love"; it was another version of one of Banton's "opinion" songs, which he had started writing in the early 1980s. "Bad Man and Woman" was inspired by Banton's love of Calypso music. "Third World Country" is about his visit to Jamaica, where he noted the stark divisions in the country.

== Critical reception ==
Professional ratings
Review scores
| Source | Rating |
|---|---|
| AllMusic | 2/5 stars |
| The Virgin Encyclopedia of Reggae | 3/5 stars |

The Kitchener-Waterloo Record said, "More lush that Wailer-style Jamaican reggae, this material is also somewhat more accessible." The News Chronicle called the album "an engaging and colorful collection of Banton's musings about the human condition". The Santa Cruz Sentinel labeled it "another ambitious recording by the reggae star who lyricizes brilliantly but sing flat".

The Tampa Tribune concluded that "Banton's trademark lyrical messages tend to overshadow the talent of his band". The Hartford Courant opined that Visions of the World "is the most generic of dub / reggae, about as bland and uncooked as it comes." The Los Angeles Times said that "Banton's music lacks both the vision of contemporaries Ziggy Marley and Shinehead—the ability to share fresh insights in the subjects they address—and the soulful fire of a Toots Hibbert".

Trouser Press lamented that "the music is slicker, leaning more towards smooth dance rock, bland soul and synthesized pop reggae."

== Track listing ==
| No. | Title | Length |
|---|---|---|
| 1. | "Third World Country" |
| 2. | "Bad Man and Woman" |
| 3. | "Roots, Rock, Reggae" |
| 4. | "Wishing on a Star" |
| 5. | "Pressure" |
| 6. | "Visions of the World" |
| 7. | "Ready Me Ready" |
| 8. | "Jah's Reggae" |
| 9. | "Pato's Opinion Pt. 2" |
| 10. | "Never Give In" |
