= Beshara (band) =

British reggae band

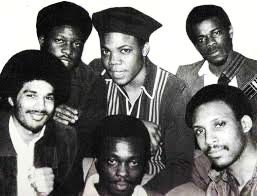
- Beshara in 1983. LTR-BTF Steve Morrison, Ray Watts, Tony Garfield, Mikey Nanton, Dixie Pinnock & Byron Bailey.

Background information
- Origin: Birmingham, England
- Genres: Reggae, lovers rock, dub, roots reggae, ska, two-tone, new wave
- Years active: 1976–1992; 1998–2000
- Label: Beshara Music - imprint of Celmaw Records
- Past members: Ray Watts aka Ray Beshara; Dixie Pinnock; Michael Nanton; Tony Garfield; Steve Morrison; Byron Bailey; Paul Cunningham; David Carr; Focett Gray
- Website: besharamusic.com

Beshara were a British reggae band from Moseley and Washwood Heath, Birmingham, that formed in 1976. The band are most notable for their 1981 lovers rock hit "Men Cry Too", which reached number 2 in the British reggae charts. Although known for their lovers rock singles, they were also very capable of recording roots reggae. This can be heard in the hymnal recording, "Glory Glory".

== History ==
The original line-up and founding members of the band were Elias Pharoah (bass), Ray Watts aka Ray Beshara (rhythm guitar, backing vocals) and Dixie Pinnock (drums), who then recruited Errol Nanton (lead vocals) and Michael Nanton (keyboards). They were formerly named Cool Dimension and The Kushites until 1979 when the band settled on the name Beshara meaning "surprise" in Arabic and "mystical" in Swahili. Over the years, the line-up of the band changed along with the roles of various members but as of 1980 the ever-present nucleus that was widely known as Ray Watts (lead vocals, rhythm guitar), Dixie Pinnock (drums, backing vocals), Michael Nanton (keyboards, backing vocals) and Tony Garfield (bass, vocals), were to remain as the core members in their new roles. In July 1980 and courtesy of John Peel, Beshara received their first radio airplay. Peel played their 2 Tone (but more authentically 1960s sounding) single, "When You're Wrong" on national BBC Radio 1.

Throughout the years, Beshara gigged extensively all over the UK in the nation's major colleges, universities and clubs, attracting multicultural audiences. They were cited by Musical Youth as one of their influences. During their active years, Beshara never released (although recorded) an album but released many singles and enjoyed success with early recordings such as "Glory Glory", "Men Cry Too" (which reached number 6 on the British reggae charts) and "Shadow of Love" (number 10 on the British reggae charts). The band won an award from the Hummingbird's 1st Annual Black Music Awards in 1987 for 'Best Sound recording'. In the late 1980s, the band members were headhunted by Ijahman Levi, to back him on his African and European tour. Beshara received much acclaim when they toured the UK and either played alongside or backed UB40, The Abyssinians, Beres Hammond, Simply Red, Dennis Brown, Bim Sherman, Musical Youth, Bad Manners, Johnny Clarke, Smiley Culture, I Roy, Pat Kelly, Leroy Smart, Sugar Minott, Macka B, Adeva, CJ Lewis, John Holt, Matumbi, They Must Be Russians, Sandra Reid, Sandra Lobban and Thelma Mae.

The 1980s also saw them achieve well-earned TV exposure by appearing on the Rockers Roadshow hosted by Mikey Dread, Black on Black, Here & Now, Format V and Together. Beshara also appeared as a gospel group in the BBC drama Marjorie and The Preacher Man starring the acclaimed British actor John Rhys-Davies. The BBC then used a Beshara song called "United" as the theme song for the BBC documentary Ring In The Park. The song would later be covered by Pato Banton and renamed "United We Stand" while also featuring the vocals of Ray Watts.

In 1992, Beshara were asked by BBC Radio WM to perform a headline concert in Handsworth, Birmingham, which was broadcast on BBC Radio WM. In the same year, the band decided to part ways only to reunite again in 1998 and they began to record in 1999 what was set to be their debut album, produced by Beshara, Paul Horton of Ecks Productions and Christopher Grey of Greyology Inc. This was also the same year that Beshara shared the stage with Alton Ellis. Ray Watts died in 2000. Due to this, the remaining members of the band decided they could no longer stay together without him and went their separate ways. In 2001, the ex-band members arranged a memorial tribute concert for Watts at the Irish Centre, Birmingham, which led to Beshara performing and sharing the stage with Steel Pulse, along with many other artists from Birmingham, including Skibu, Reggae Revolution, Jeremiah, Birry The Poet, and many more. In the same year, Pato Banton's album Life is Miracle, which featured a song written by and featuring Watts called "United We Stand", received a Grammy nomination for Best Reggae Album. The song has also featured on the Pato Banton albums, Universal Love and Time Come (Brazil Version).

2005 saw the ex-members reunite to perform a one-off show at the "32 Years of Lovers Rock" anniversary concert at the Hackney Empire in London. They shared the stage with Louisa Mark and Peter Hunnigale among others.

Past members Steve Morrison and Michael Nanton, who began and crafted their musicianship in Beshara, now make up the integral part of the Reggae Revolution band. The Reggae Revolution have backed and toured the world with artists such as Sting, Pato Banton, Apache Indian, Musical Youth, Gregory Isaacs and many more. They've also written or performed on the Grammy nominated albums Rage & Fury and African Holocaust by Steel Pulse, as well as Life Is A Miracle by Pato Banton.

In 2010, Beshara were featured in a documentary called Made in Birmingham: Reggae, Punk, Bhangra, which has had numerous screenings internationally and throughout the UK. It was awarded a special commendation from the RTS Midlands.

A non-performance clip of the band, originating from the 1979 documentary Format V, was featured in the 2011 BBC Four documentary Reggae Britannia.

On 23 September 2011, as a tribute to Ray Watts, Tony Garfield performed as Beshara at the "Giants of Lovers Rock Part 3" concert at the indigO2 in London. Garfield shared the stage with Janet Kay, Freddie McGregor, Susan Cadogan, Carroll Thompson and many more.

== Former members ==
- Ray Watts (aka "Ray Beshara") - Lead vocals, rhythm guitar
- Tony Garfield - Bass guitar, vocals
- Dixie Pinnock - Drums, BV's
- Michael Nanton - Keyboards, BV's
- Steve Morrison - Trombone, toasting
- Byron Bailey - Sax
- Errol Nanton - Vocals
- Paul Cunningham - Bass guitar, BV's
- David Carr (aka "Fluff") - Toasting, trumpet
- Elias Pharoah - Bass guitar
- Focett Gray - Lead guitar

== Television appearances ==
- Rockers Roadshow (1983), Central Independent Television/Channel 4
- Black on Black (1985), LWT/Channel 4
- Here & Now (1985), Central Television
- Format V (1979), ATV
- Together (1983), BBC 1
- Marjorie and the Preacher Man (1987), BBC 1
- Reggae Britannia (2011), BBC Four
- Born on the Same Day (2016), Channel 4

== Filmography ==
- Made in Birmingham: Reggae, Punk, Bhangra (2010), Swish Films/Birmingham Music Archive

== Discography ==
=== Compilations ===
- Out The Lights Vol.3 (1991), Discotex
- Out The Lights Vol.4 (1992), Discotex
- Relaxin' With Lovers Volume 5 - Santic And More Lovers (2004), Sony Music Entertainment Japan
- Relaxin' With Lovers Volume 9 (2006), Sony Music Entertainment Japan
- The Best Of Original British Lovers Rock Vol. 2 (2008), Jet Star

=== Singles ===
- "Africans" (1980) Rising Star
- "When You're Wrong (Say You're Wrong)"/"That's Life" (1980) Voyage
- "Men Cry Too"/"Man-A-Reason" (1981) Mass Media Music
- "Won't Let You Go"/"Rising Sun" (1982) Mass Media Music
- "Never Knew A Love Like (This Before)" (1983) Home Spun
- "Glory Glory" (1983) Home Spun
- "Shadow of Love" (1984) Sub Zero
- "Candi"/"Satta Massagana" (1987) C&E
- "I Wanna Be Your Man"/"You Are Everything" (1989) World Time Music
- "Men Cry Too (92)" (1992) Klassic Records
