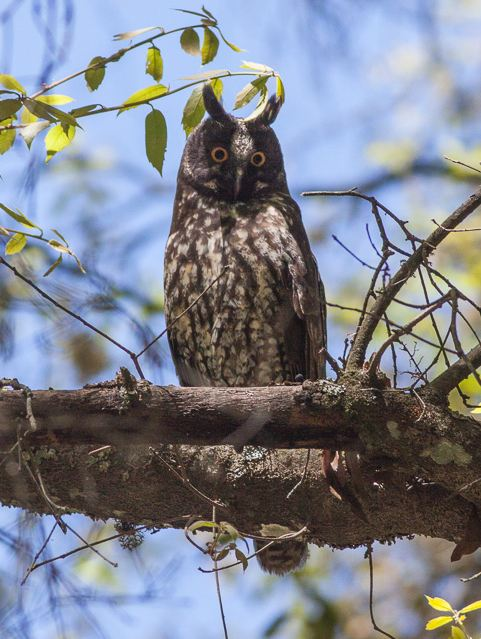

Conservation status
- Least Concern (IUCN 3.1)
- CITES Appendix II

Scientific classification
- Kingdom: Animalia
- Phylum: Chordata
- Class: Aves
- Order: Strigiformes
- Family: Strigidae
- Genus: Asio
- Species: A. stygius

Binomial name
- Asio stygius (Wagler, 1832)

= Stygian owl =

Species of owl

The Stygian owl (Asio stygius) is a medium-sized "typical owl" in subfamily Striginae. It is found in Mexico, parts of Central America, Cuba, Hispaniola, and 10 countries in South America.

== Taxonomy and systematics ==
The Stygian owl has these six recognized subspecies:

- A. s. lambi Moore, RT (1937)
- A. s. robustus Kelso, L (1934)
- A. s. siguapa d'Orbigny (1839), common name siguapa
- A. s. noctipetens Riley (1916)
- A. s. stygius Wagler (1832)
- A. s. barberoi Bertoni, AW (1930)

== Description ==
The Stygian owl is 38 to 46 cm (15 to 18 in) long and weighs about 400 to 675 g (14 to 24 oz). The sexes have similar very dark plumage. (The adjective "Stygian" means "of, or relating to, the River Styx", but is more widely applied to anything that is dark or dismal.) The face is blackish with a pale border and a whitish forehead, and the head has long dark feathers that project upward as "ears". The dark upperparts have buff streaks and bars; the underparts are a dingy buff with dark brown or blackish barring and streaks. The eye is shades of yellow, the bill blue-black to blackish, and the feet dark grayish or brownish pink. Its eyes may appear to be a shade of crimson under certain lighting due to their reflective nature. The subspecies are substantially alike, differing mostly in the shade of the upperparts' streaks and somewhat in size.

== Distribution and habitat ==
The subspecies of Stygian owl are found thus (but see the text below the list):

- A. s. lambi, northwestern Mexico from Sonora and Chihuahua south to Jalisco
- A. s. robustus, discontinuously from Guerrero and Veracruz in Mexico south into northern Nicaragua
- A. s. siguapa, mainland Cuba and Isla de la Juventud (Isle of Pines)
- A. s. noctipetens, mainland Hispaniola (Dominican Republic and Haiti) and Gonâve Island
- A. s. stygius, Colombia and Venezuela south to Bolivia and discontinuously in central and southern Brazil
- A. s. barberoi, Paraguay and northern Argentina

In addition, the Stygian owl has been documented as a vagrant in Texas, Florida, and Trinidad.

Some authors merge A. s. lambi into A. s. robustus. Some extend the range of robustus to include the Colombian, Ecuadorian, and Venezuelan populations otherwise attributed to A. s. stygius. Some include A. s. noctipetens in A. s. siguapa. And some include the population in southeastern Brazil in A. s. barberoi instead of in A. s. stygius.

The Stygian owl inhabits a wide variety of landscapes from sea level to 3,000 m (9,800 ft) of elevation. Most are fairly open rather than densely forested or purely grasslands. They include montane pine, pine-oak, and cloud forests, thorn scrub, cerrado, pine plantations, and even urban parks.

== Behavior ==
=== Movement ===
As far as is known, the Stygian owl is resident throughout its range.

=== Feeding ===
The Stygian owl is wholly nocturnal. The largest part of its diet is birds, from very small ones to some as large as the 150 g (5.3 oz) lesser nothura (Nothura minor); it is thought that most birds are caught on their nighttime roosts. The diet also includes bats (which are seldom preyed on by other owls), some other mammals (like Hispaniolan solenodons), frogs, and insects. Also, in contrast to other owls, rodents do not appear to be part of its diet.

=== Breeding ===
The Stygian owl's breeding phenology is not well known. Its breeding seasons vary widely across its range. Males give a wing-clapping display in flight. It nests on the ground or in trees; in the latter it apparently reuses nests of other species. It lays two or three eggs.

=== Vocalization ===
The Stygian owl's song has been variously described as "a single deep, emphatic woof or wupf", "a very low and loud hu or hu-hu", and "a muffled hoot given singly: boo". Females also give "a short, screamed rre-ehhr or mehrr" when calling to the male, and also "a short catlike miah".

== Status ==
The IUCN has assessed the Stygian owl as being of least concern. It has a very large range, and as of 2023 its population is estimated to be 50,000 – 500,000 mature individuals; this population is believed to be decreasing. No specific threats have been identified.
