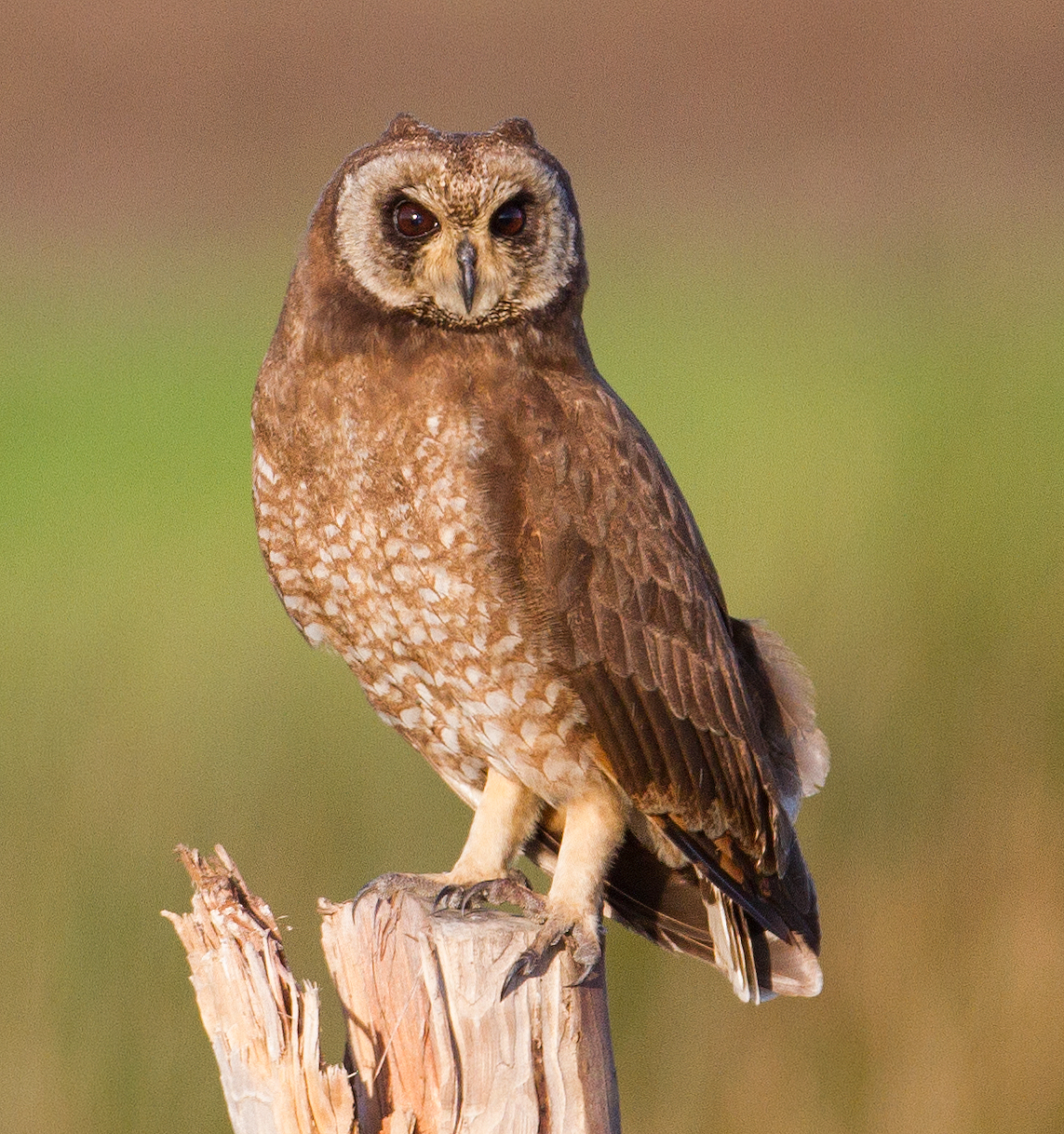
- in Morocco

Conservation status
- Least Concern (IUCN 3.1)
- CITES Appendix II

Scientific classification
- Kingdom: Animalia
- Phylum: Chordata
- Class: Aves
- Order: Strigiformes
- Family: Strigidae
- Genus: Asio
- Species: A. capensis

Binomial name
- Asio capensis (Smith, 1834)
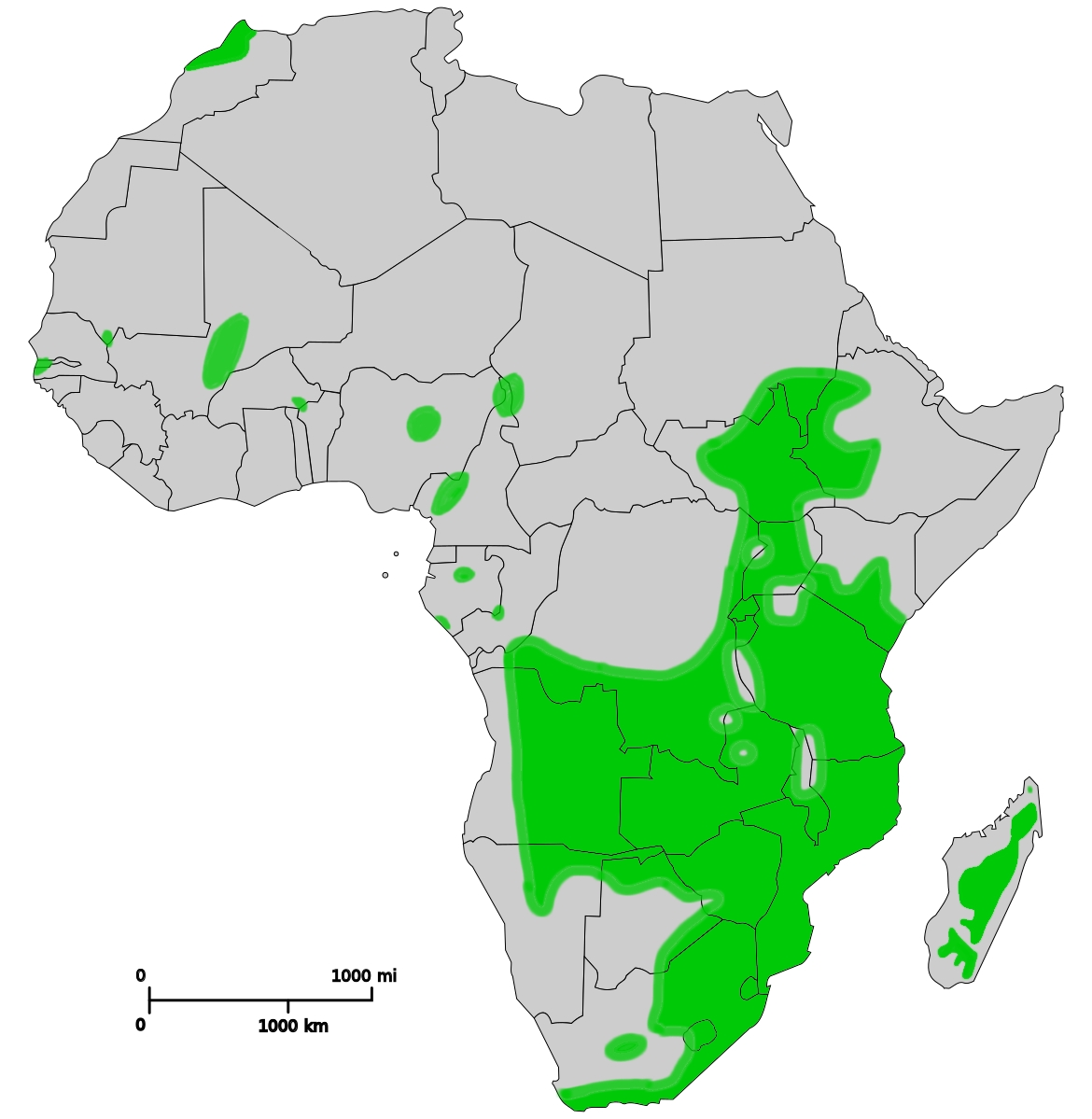
- native range

= Marsh owl =

Species of owl

The marsh owl (Asio capensis) is a medium to large species of owl in the family Strigidae.

== Description ==
Medium-sized, dark brown with a pumpkin-shaped head with small 'ear' tufts. The facial disc is pale buff, with a distinct dark brown rim with buff speckles. There is a dark brown area around the eyes, which are also dark brown. Its ear-tufts are earth-brown and quite small, often not visible, and set near the centre of the forehead. The tail is dark brown, barred pale buff with a whitish tip. Tarsi are feathered pale tawny-buff and toes are covered with pale buffish plumes, leaving the dark brown tips bare. Claws are blackish.

Males are generally paler than females, and there is some individual variation in tone. Length is 31–38 cm, wing length is 284–380mm, tail length is 132–186mm, and weight is 225–485g.

== Habitat ==
The marsh owl's habitat preference is open grassland, marshlands and short scrub, typically near marshy grounds, vleis or dams. Marsh owls prefer to nest on the ground and they have also been observed leaving certain areas during drought-stricken times. Their preferred habitat tends to be vulnerable to destruction due to agriculture or overgrazing.

== Breeding ==
Nesting usually occurs towards the end of the wet season or the start of the dry season. The owls are monogamous and often territorial. They may nest in loose colonies. Territories are normally 0.8–2.5 square km but may be even smaller in denser populations. Hunting areas of neighboring pairs may overlap. The nest is typically a hollow within a patch of grass, in which the grass or shrubs are pulled over to form a canopy, and the bottom is lined with dry foliage.

The female will lay between 2–6 white eggs over the course of a few days. The incubation period is 27–28 days, and during this time the female will remain on the eggs and will be fed by her partner. After hatching the chicks will remain in the nest until about 18 days. They will fully fledge at 29–35 days and be fully feathered by 70 days.

== Behavior and diet ==
Marsh owls are typically found singly or in pairs. They are usually nocturnal; however, they are sometimes active during early morning and late afternoon.

The marsh owl typically feeds on small rodents, insects and other small vertebrates. Prey items include mice, voles, rats, shrews, young hares, bats, birds up to the size of small ducks and doves, frogs, lizards, scorpions, beetles and grasshoppers.

== Distribution ==
The marsh owl has a fragmented distribution. They are common in the grasslands of southern Africa, occurring in the northern regions of South Africa down to the province of the Eastern Cape. They are also found in Zimbabwe on the Mashonaland plateau, and in the Makgadikgadi lacustrine depression in Botswana.

They have also been recorded on the floodplains on the Namibian coast and in isolated populations in Morocco and Madagascar.

== Conservation status ==
Marsh owls are not considered to be threatened, and as of 2021 their population is believed to be stable. However, the species is considered to be critically endangered across its range in Morocco. Marsh owls commonly breed during the winter months when veld fires occur. They nest on the ground in habitat that typically includes marshes, savannas and grasslands. Farmers burn veld to stimulate the regrowth of vegetation for grazing, to prevent the encroachment of unwanted plants and weeds and to control ticks. Although veld fires are necessary for maintaining the grassland's ecosystem, it should be limited to a 5-year cycle instead of an annual event. Irresponsible burning of veld robs wildlife of habitat and in the case of marsh owls, it has a huge impact on their breeding and population.

== Gallery ==
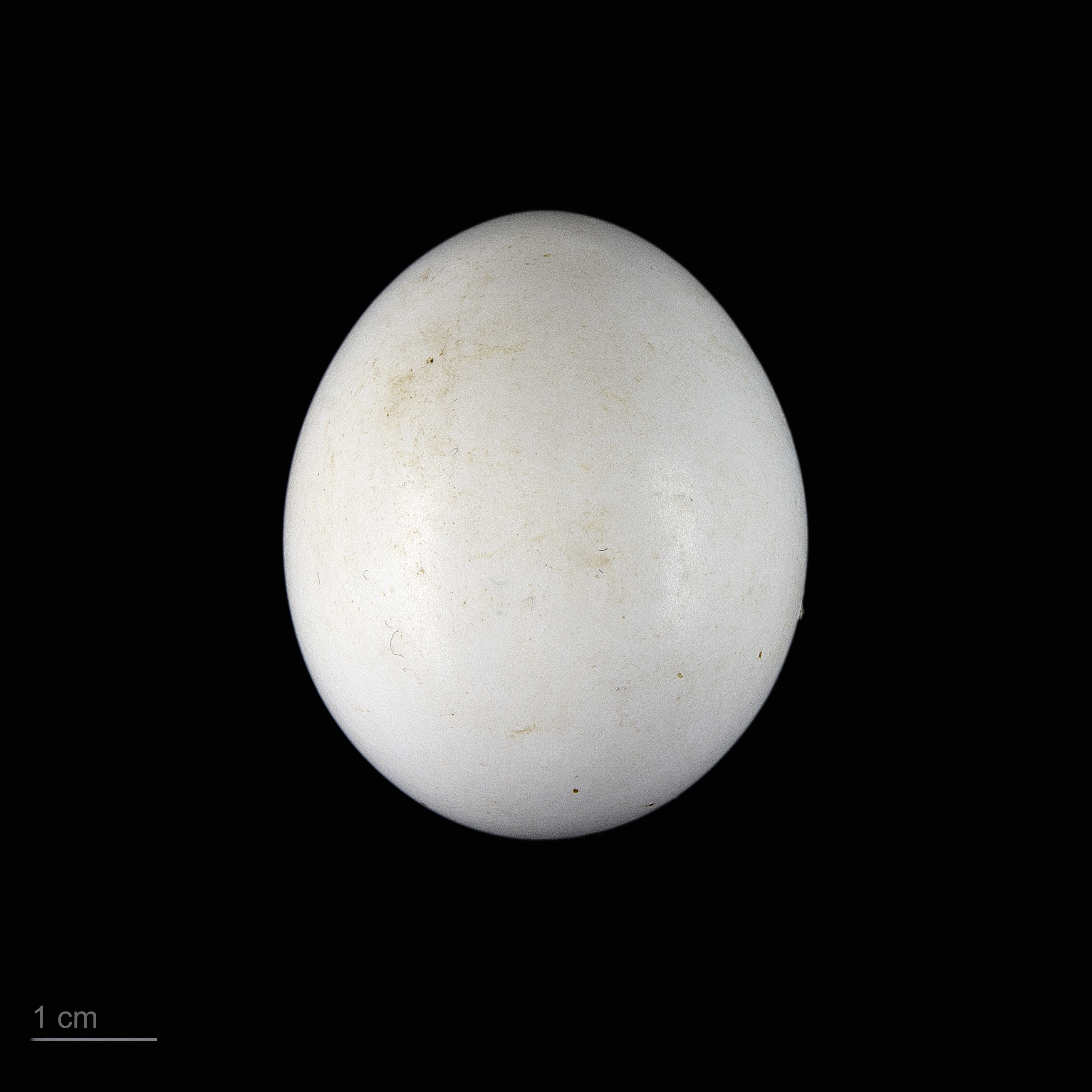
Egg of Asio capensis tingitanus - MHNT

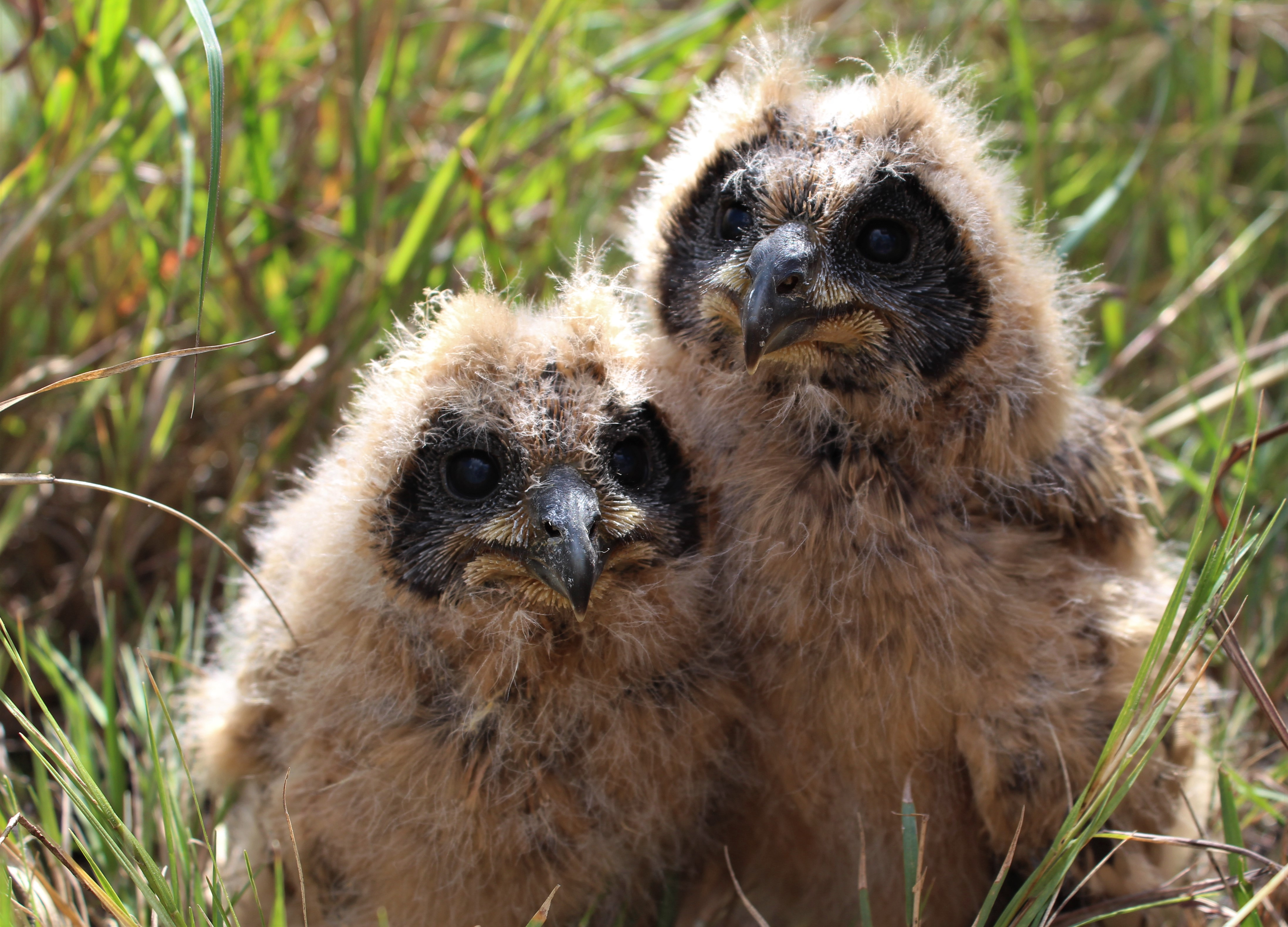
Two chicks rescued by the Owl Rescue Centre in South Africa

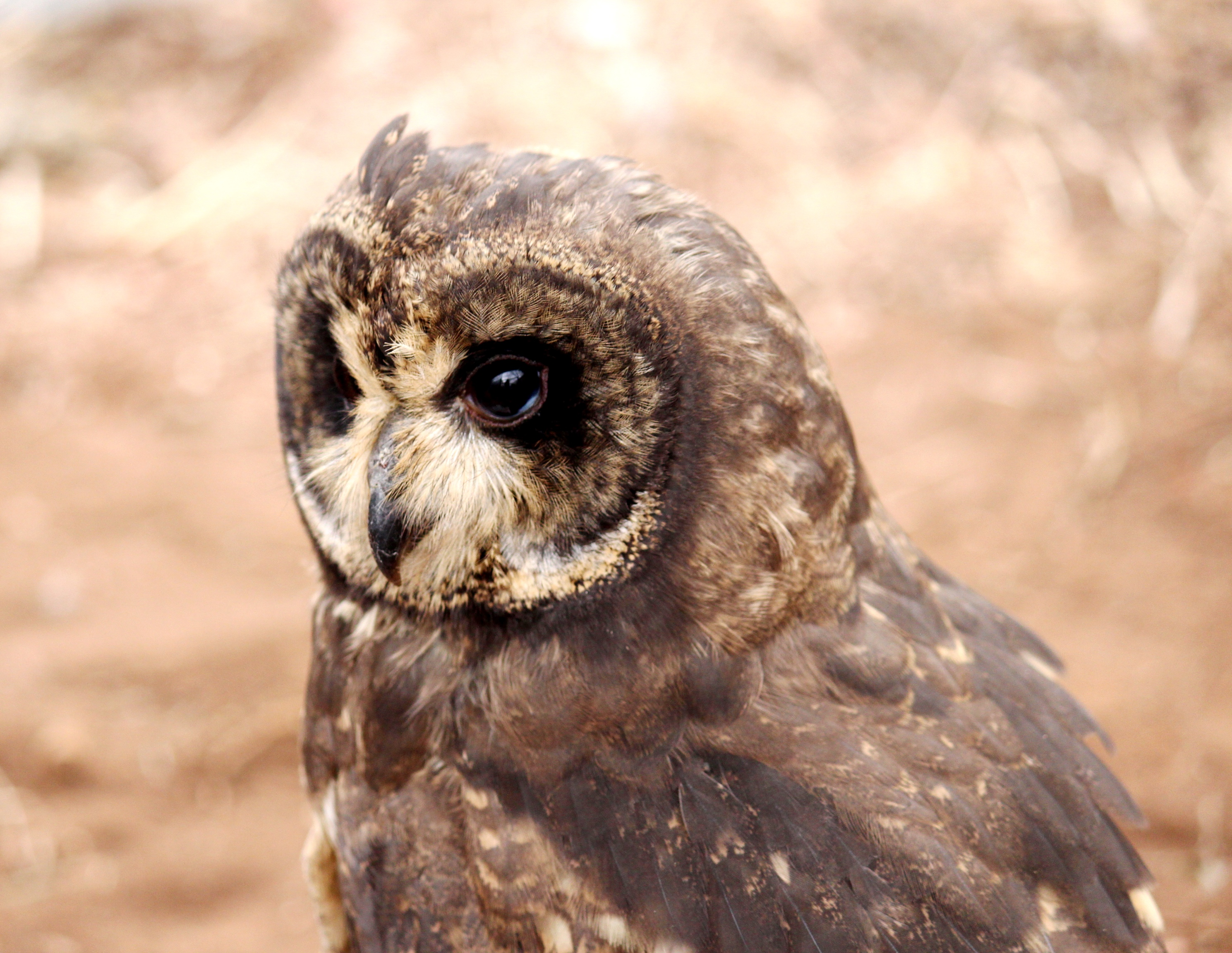
Close-up of the head
