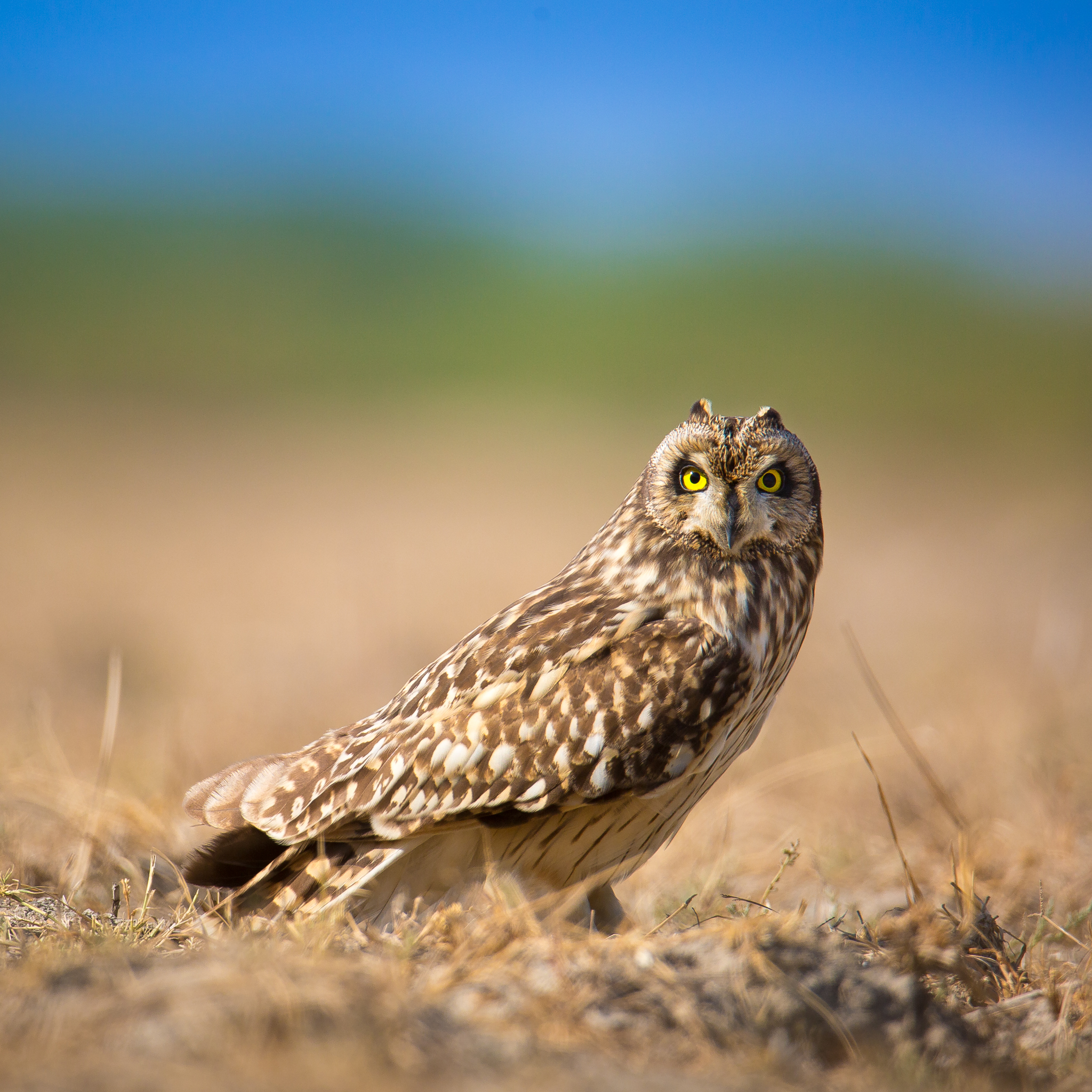
- Individual at the Little Rann of Kutch.

Conservation status
- Least Concern (IUCN 3.1)
- CITES Appendix II

Scientific classification
- Kingdom: Animalia
- Phylum: Chordata
- Class: Aves
- Order: Strigiformes
- Family: Strigidae
- Genus: Asio
- Species: A. flammeus

Binomial name
- Asio flammeus (Pontoppidan, 1763)
- Range of A. flammeus Breeding Resident Passage Non-breeding

Synonyms
- Asio accipitrinus (Pallas, 1771); Strix accipitrina Pallas, 1771; Strix flammea Pontoppidan, 1763

= Short-eared owl =

Species of owl

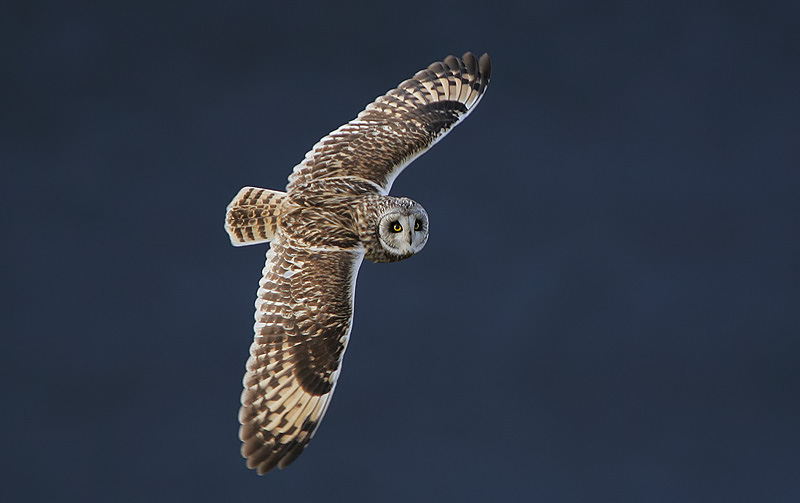
In flight

In Texel, North Holland, Netherlands

The short-eared owl (Asio flammeus) is a widespread grassland species in the family Strigidae. Owls belonging to genus Asio are known as the eared owls, as they have tufts of feathers resembling mammalian ears. These "ear" tufts may or may not be visible. The short-eared owl will display its tufts when in a defensive pose, although its very short tufts are usually not visible. The short-eared owl is found in open country and grasslands.

== Taxonomy ==
The short-eared owl was formally described in 1763 by the Lutheran bishop Erik Pontoppidan under the binomial name Strix flammea. The specific epithet is from the Latin flammeus meaning "flammulated" or "flame-coloured". This owl is now placed with seven other species in the genus Asio that was introduced by the French zoologist Mathurin Jacques Brisson in 1760.

Eleven subspecies are recognised:

- A. f. flammeus – (Pontoppidan, 1763): the nominate subspecies, found in North America, Europe, North Africa and northern Asia
- A. f. cubensis – Garrido, 2007: found in Cuba
- A. f. domingensis – (Statius Müller, 1776): found on Hispaniola
- A. f. portoricensis – Ridgway, 1882: found in Puerto Rico
- A. f. bogotensis – Chapman, 1915: found in Colombia, Ecuador and northwestern Peru
- A. f. galapagoensis – (Gould, 1837): found on the Galápagos Islands
- A. f. pallidicaudus – Friedmann, 1949: found in Venezuela, Guyana and Suriname
- A. f. suinda – (Vieillot, 1817): found from southern Peru and southern Brazil to Tierra del Fuego
- A. f. sanfordi – Bangs, 1919: found on the Falkland Islands
- A. f. sandwichensis – (A. Bloxam, 1827): Pueo or Hawaiian short-eared owl - found on the Hawaiian Islands
- A. f. ponapensis – Mayr, 1933: found on Pohnpei in the Caroline Islands

== Description ==
The short-eared owl is a medium-sized owl measuring 34–43 cm (13–17 in) in length and weighing 206–475 g (7.3–16.8 oz). It has large eyes, a big head, a short neck, and broad wings. Its bill is short, strong, hooked and black. Its plumage is mottled tawny to brown with a barred tail and wings. The upper breast is significantly streaked. Its flight is characteristically floppy due to its irregular wingbeats. The short-eared owl may also be described as "moth or bat-like" in flight. Wingspans range from 85 to 110 cm (33 to 43 in). Females are slightly larger than males. The yellow-orange eyes of A. flammeus are exaggerated by black rings encircling each eye, giving the appearance of them wearing mascara, and large, whitish disks of plumage surrounding the eyes like a mask.

=== Calls ===
Short-eared owls have a scratchy bark-like call. Raspy waowk, waowk, waowk or toot-toot-toot-toot-toot sounds are common. A loud eeee-yerp is also heard on breeding grounds. However, short-eared owls are silent on the wintering grounds.

=== Separation from the long-eared owl ===
Through much of its range, short-eared owls occurs with the similar-looking long-eared owl. At rest, the ear-tufts of the long-eared owl serve to easily distinguish the two (although long-eared owls can sometimes hold their ear-tufts flat). The iris-colour differs: yellow in the short-eared, and (often, though not always) orange in the long-eared, and the black surrounding the eyes is vertical on the long-eared, and horizontal on the short-eared. Overall the short-eared tends to be a paler, sandier bird than the long-eared. There are a number of other ways in which the two species the differ which are best seen when they are flying: a) the short-eared often has a broad white band along the rear edge of the wing, which is not shown by the long-eared; b) on the upperwing, short-eared owls' primary-patches are usually paler and more obvious; c) the band on the upper side of the short-eared owl's tail are usually bolder than those of the long-eared; d) the short-eared's innermost secondaries are often dark-marked, contrasting with the rest of the underwing; e) the long-eared owl has streaking throughout its underparts, whereas on the short-eared the streaking ends at the breast; f) the dark markings on the underside of the tips of the longest primaries are bolder on the short-eared owl; g) the upper parts are coarsely blotched, whereas on the long-eared they are more finely marked. The short-eared owl also differs structurally from the long-eared, having longer, slimmer wings: the long-eared owl has wings shaped more like those of a tawny owl. The long-eared owl generally has different habitat preferences from the short-eared, most often being found concealed in areas with dense wooded thickets. The short-eared owl is often most regularly seen flying about in early morning or late day as it hunts over open habitats.

== Distribution and habitat ==
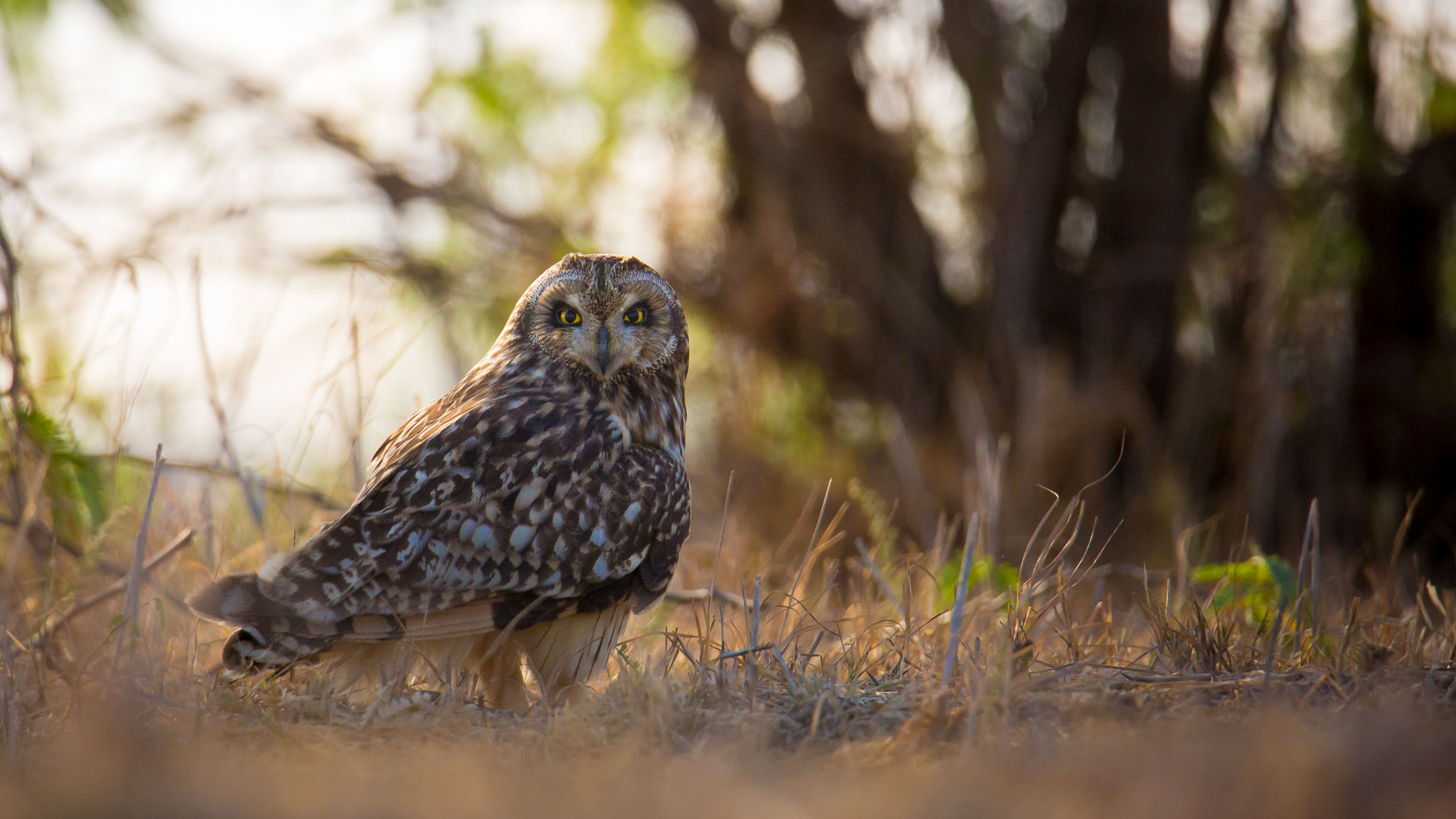
Short-eared owl in its habitat. Note the choice of short, shady trees to roost under.

The short-eared owl occurs on all continents except Antarctica and Australia; thus it has one of the most widespread distributions of any bird. A. flammeus breeds in Europe, Asia, North and South America, the Caribbean, Hawaii and the Galápagos Islands. It is partially migratory, moving south in winter from the northern parts of its range. The short-eared owl is known to relocate to areas of higher rodent populations. It will also wander nomadically in search of better food supplies during years when vole populations are low. (See a map of the short-eared owl's distribution across the New World.)

Full list of countries where Asio flammeus is found
Native: Afghanistan; Albania; Algeria; Argentina; Armenia; Austria; Azerbaijan; Bahrain; Bangladesh; Belarus; Belgium; Bolivia; Bosnia and Herzegovina; Brazil; Bulgaria; Canada; Cayman Islands; Chile; China; Colombia; Croatia; Cuba; Cyprus; Czech Republic; Denmark; Dominican Republic; Ecuador; Egypt; Eritrea; Estonia; Ethiopia; Falkland Islands (Malvinas); Faroe Islands; Federated States of Micronesia; Finland; France; French Guiana; Georgia; Germany; Greece; Guam; Guatemala; Guinea; Guyana; Haiti; Hungary; Iceland; India; Iran, Iraq; Ireland; Israel; Italy; Jamaica; Japan; Jordan; Kazakhstan; North Korea, South Korea); Kuwait; Kyrgyzstan; Laos; Latvia; Lebanon; Libya; Lithuania; Luxembourg; Maldives; Mali; Malta; Marshall Islands; Mauritania; Mexico; Moldova; Mongolia; Montenegro; Morocco; Myanmar; Nepal; Netherlands; North Macedonia; Northern Mariana Islands; Norway; Oman; Pakistan; Palestinian territories; Paraguay; Peru; Poland; Portugal; Puerto Rico; Romania; Russian Federation; Saint Pierre and Miquelon; Saudi Arabia; Senegal; Serbia; Slovakia; Slovenia; South Georgia and the South Sandwich Islands; Spain; Sudan; Suriname; Sweden; Switzerland; Syria; Taiwan; Tajikistan; Tunisia; Turkey; Turkmenistan; Ukraine; United Arab Emirates; United Kingdom; United States; Uruguay; Uzbekistan; Venezuela; Vietnam; British Virgin Islands; Yemen; Vagrant: Belize; Bermuda; Bhutan; Brunei Darussalam; Cameroon; Cape Verde; Chad; Costa Rica; Gibraltar; Greenland; Hong Kong; Kenya; Liberia; Liechtenstein; Malaysia; Niger; Philippines; Qatar; Singapore; Sri Lanka; Svalbard and Jan Mayen; Thailand; Trinidad and Tobago; Uganda; U.S. Virgin Islands

== Behaviour ==
=== Breeding ===
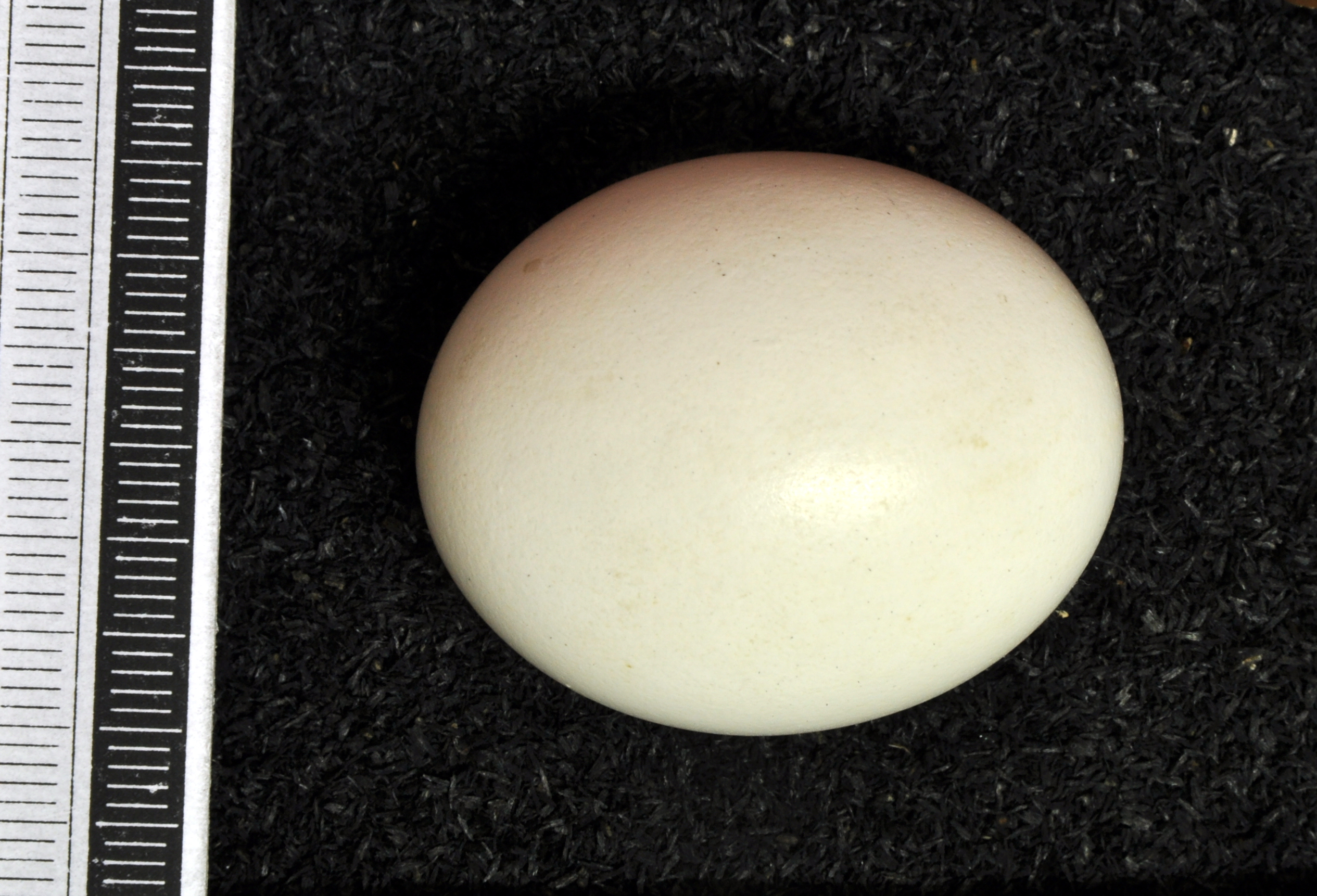
Egg, Collection Museum Wiesbaden

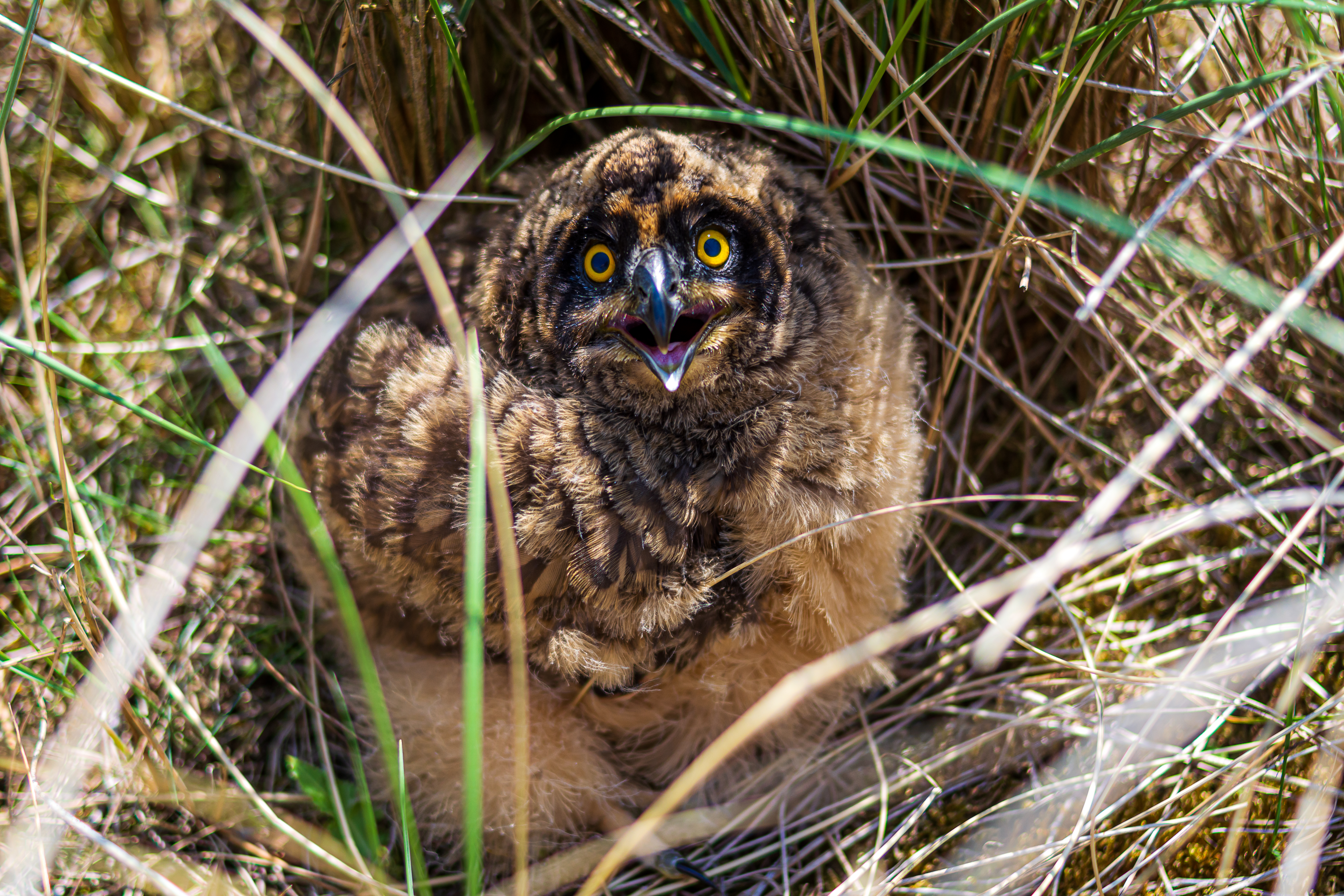
Juvenile short-eared owl in Germany

Sexual maturity is attained at one year. Breeding season in the northern hemisphere lasts from March to June, peaking in April. During this time these owls may gather in flocks. During breeding season, the males make great spectacles of themselves in flight to attract females. The male swoops down over the nest flapping its wings in a courtship display. These owls are generally monogamous.

The short-eared owl nests on the ground in prairie, tundra, savanna, or meadow habitats. Nests are concealed by low vegetation, and may be lightly lined by weeds, grass, or feathers. Approximately 4 to 7 white eggs are found in a typical clutch, but clutch size can reach up to a dozen eggs in years when voles are abundant. There is one brood per year. The eggs are incubated mostly by the female for 21–37 days. Offspring fledge at a little over four weeks. This owl is known to lure predators away from its nest by appearing to have a crippled wing.

=== Food and feeding ===
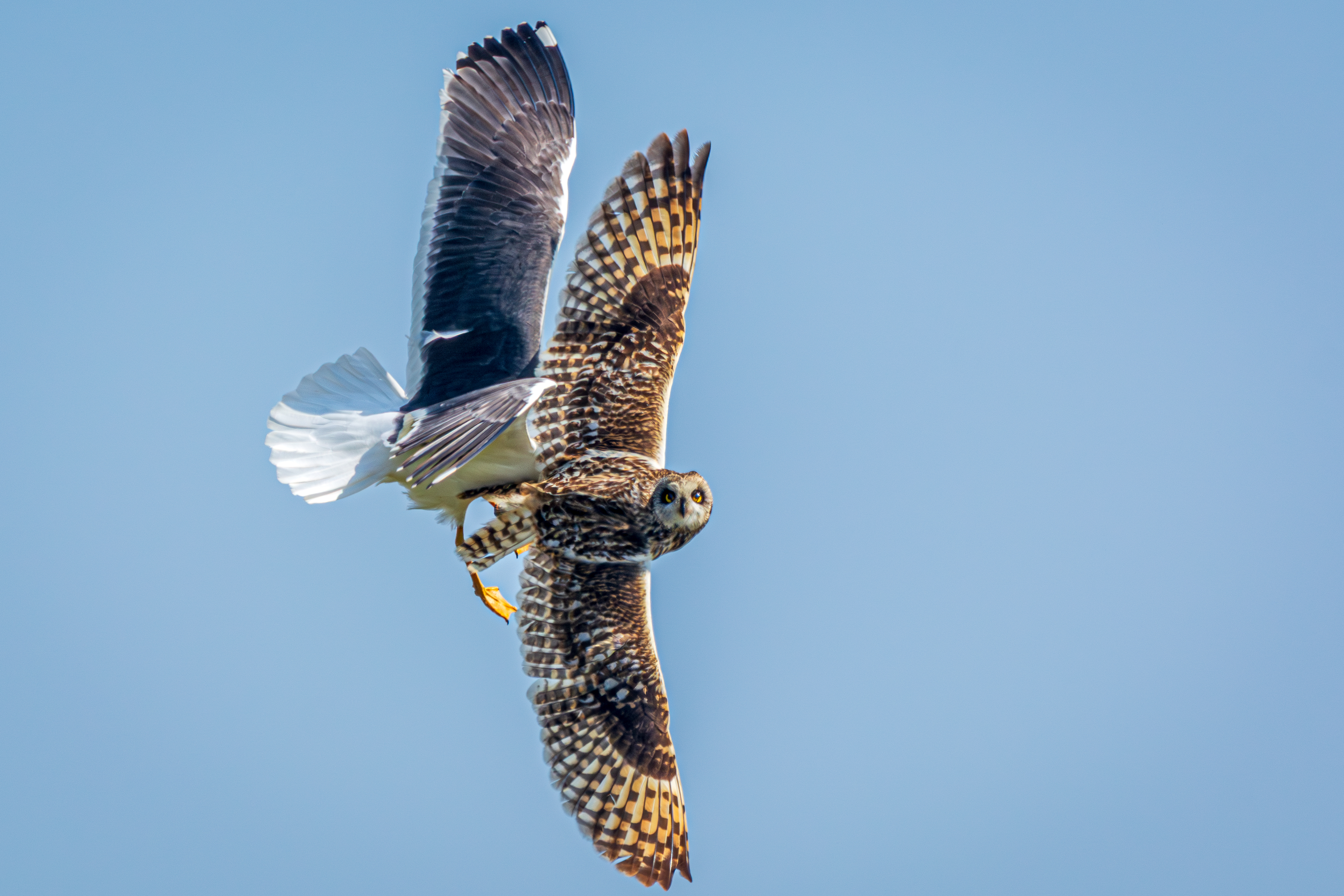
Lesser black-backed gull chasing a short-eared owl

Hunting occurs mostly at night, but this owl is known to be diurnal and crepuscular as well. Its daylight hunting seems to coincide with the high-activity periods of voles, its preferred prey. It tends to fly only feet above the ground in open fields and grasslands until swooping down upon its prey feet-first. Several owls may hunt over the same open area. Its food consists mainly of rodents, especially voles, but it will eat other small mammals such as rabbits, mice, ground squirrels, shrews, rats, bats, muskrats and moles. It will also occasionally depredate smaller birds, especially when near sea-coasts and adjacent wetlands at which time they attack shorebirds, terns and small gulls and seabirds with semi-regularity. Avian prey is more infrequently preyed on inland and centers on passerines such as larks, icterids, starlings, tyrant flycatchers and pipits. Insects supplement the diet and short-eared owls may prey on roaches, grasshoppers, beetles, katydids and caterpillars. Competition can be fierce in North America with the northern harrier, with which the owl shares similar habitat and prey preferences. Both species will readily harass the other when prey is caught.

Because of the high pH in the stomach of owls they have a reduced ability to digest bone and other hard parts, so they eject pellets containing the remains of their prey.

== Conservation status ==
The short-eared owl has an estimated global population of 1,200,000 to 2,100,000 and a very large range. On that basis, it is evaluated by the IUCN as a species of least concern.

It is listed as declining in the southern portion of its United States range. It is common in the northern portion of its breeding range. It is listed as endangered in New Mexico. Its appearance at the Calverton Executive Airpark on Long Island has prompted the New York State Department of Environmental Conservation to take the lead on ruling whether a massive redevelopment of the airport will receive the necessary environmental permits.

== Gallery ==
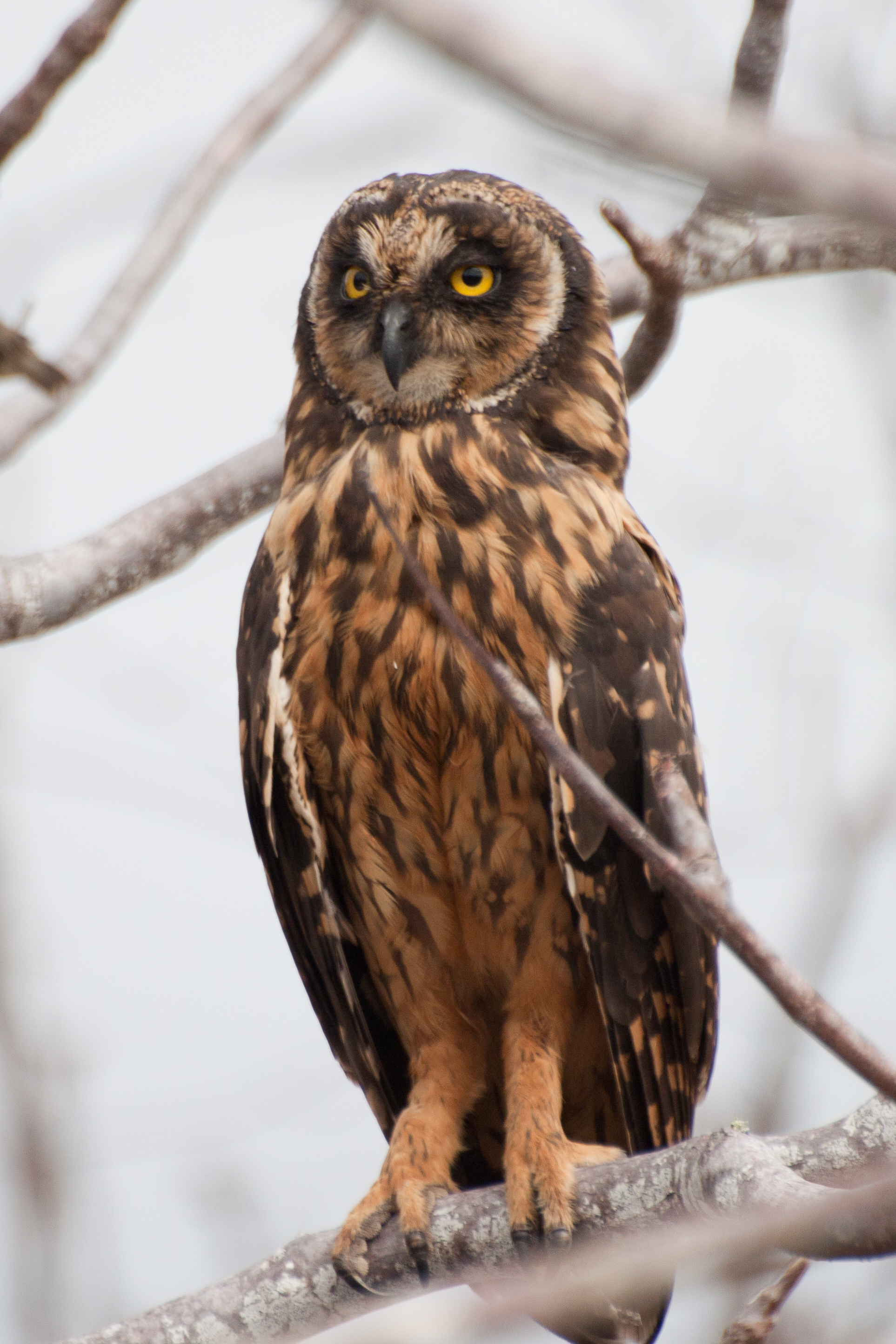
Asio flammeus galapagoensis on the Galapagos Islands, Ecuador

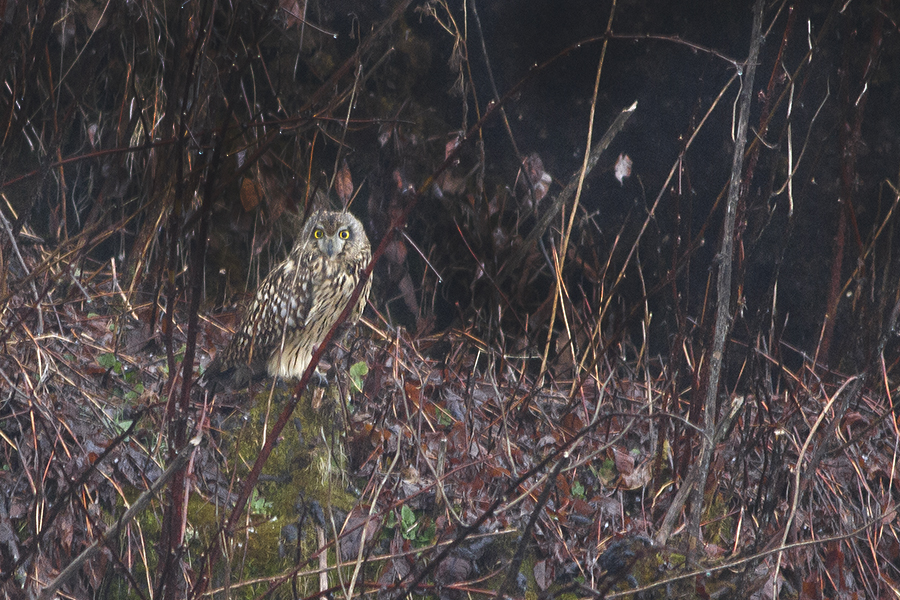
Asio flammeus flammeus from Pangolakha Wildlife Sanctuary

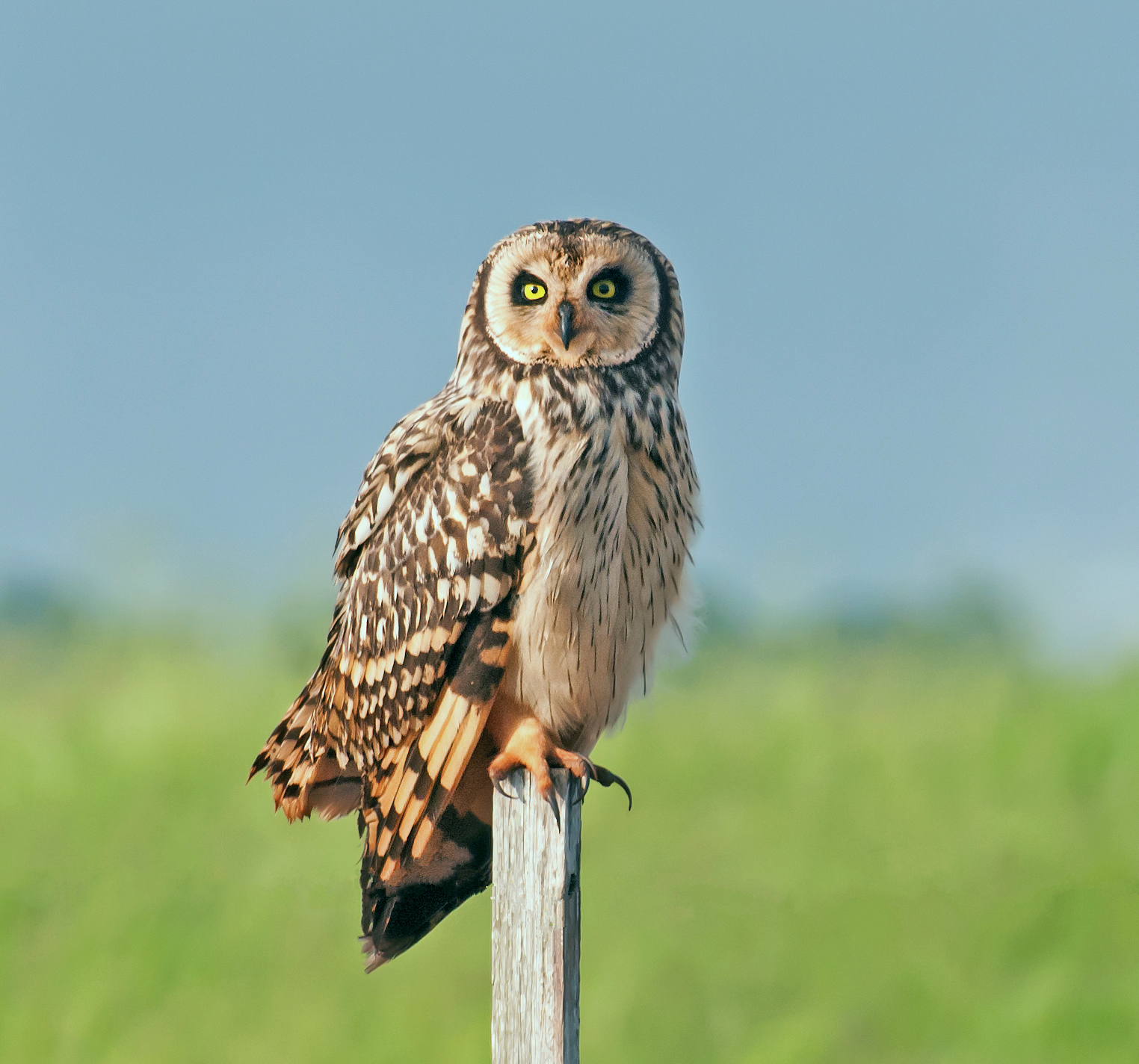
Asio flammeus suinda in Piraju, São Paulo, Brazil

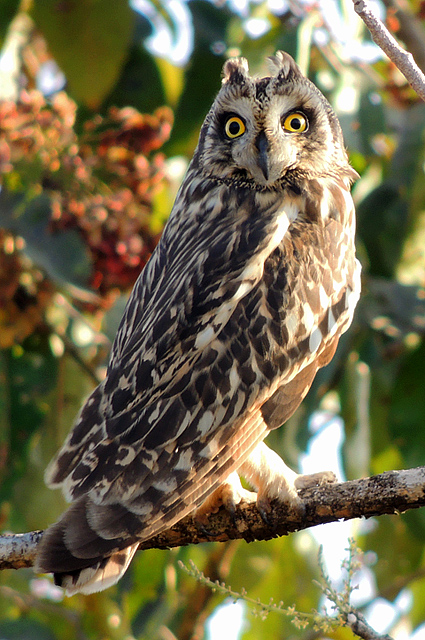
Asio flammeus flammeus in Mangaon, Maharashtra, India

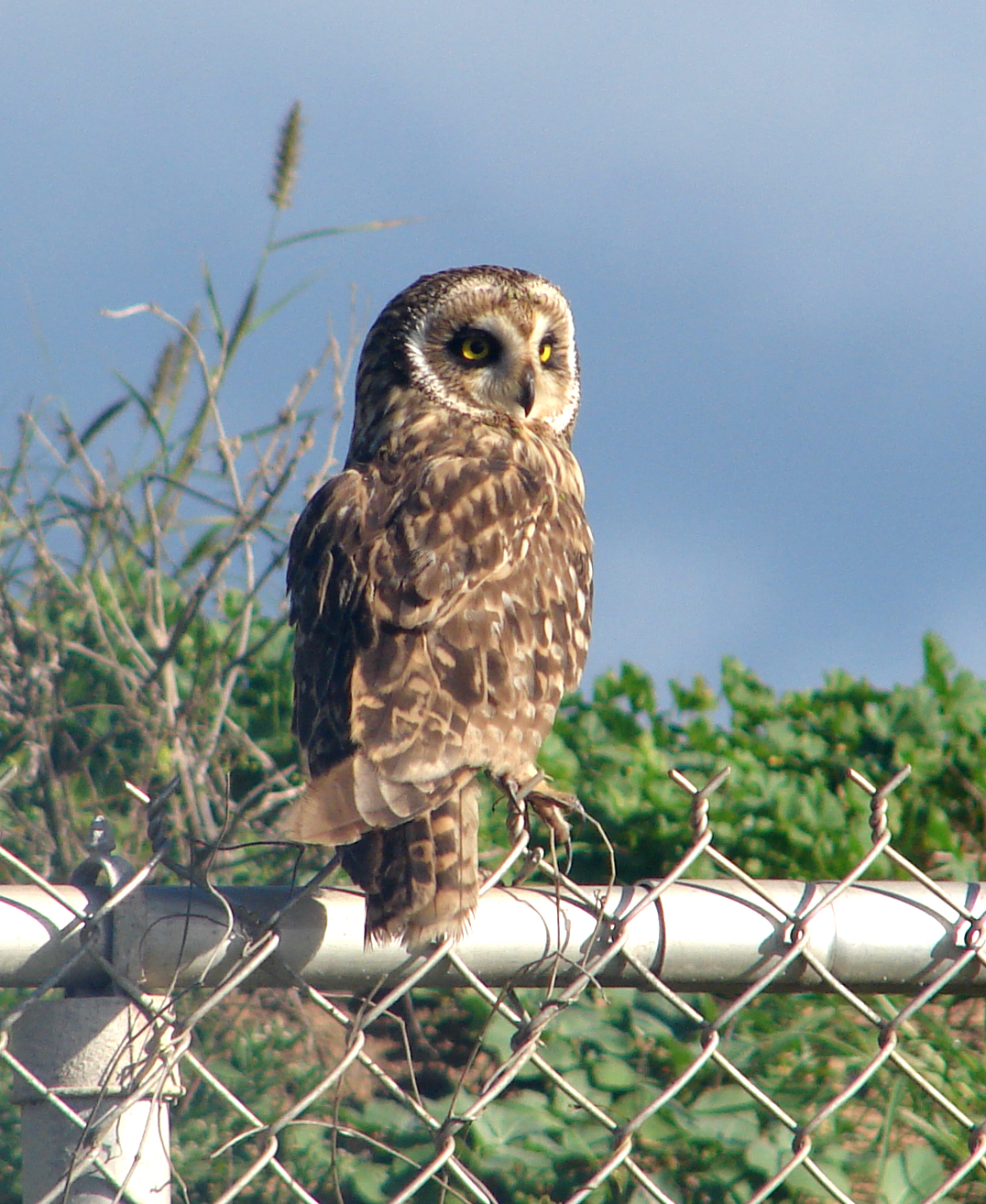
Asio flammeus sandwichensis in Maui

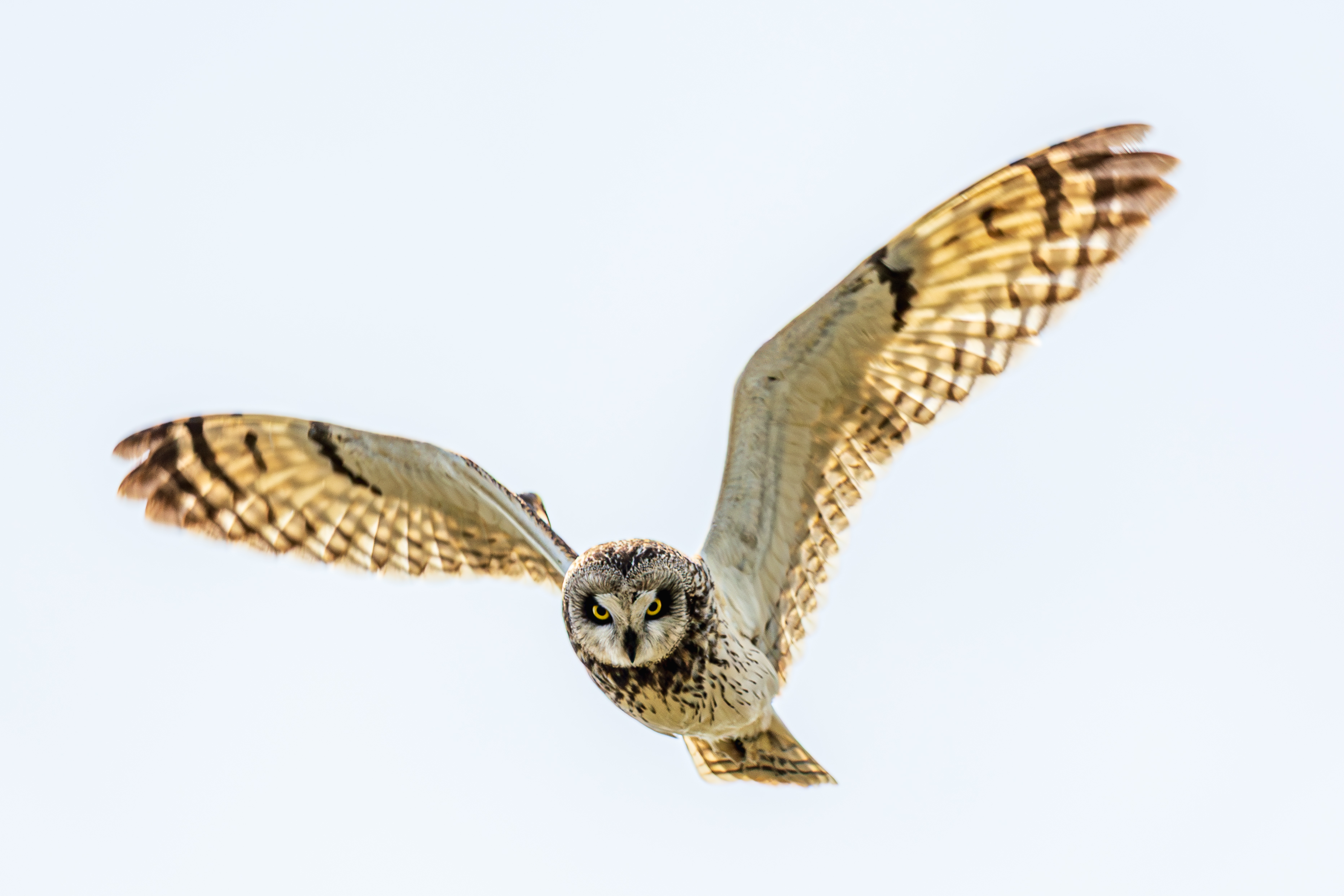
Asio flammeus flammeus in Germany
