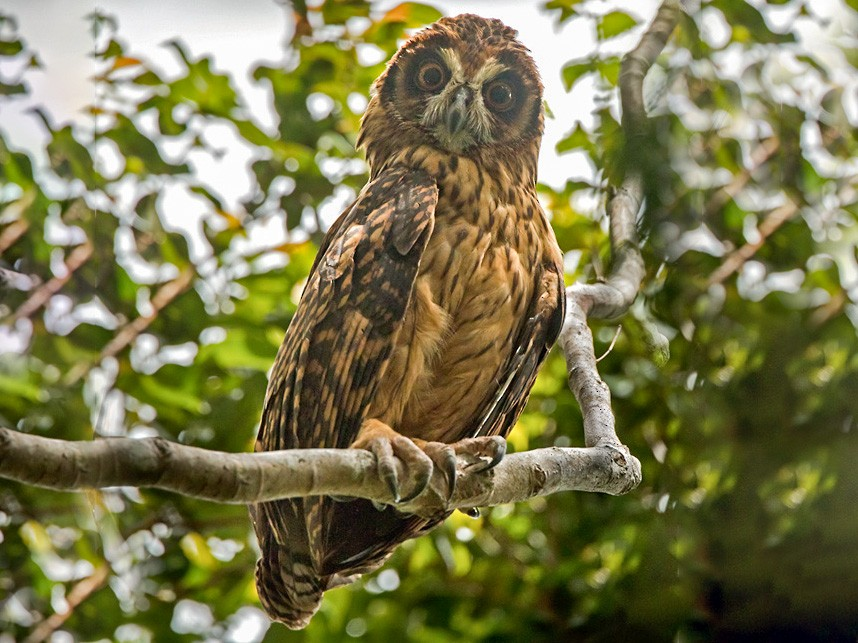

Conservation status
- Near Threatened (IUCN 3.1)
- CITES Appendix II (CITES)

Scientific classification
- Kingdom: Animalia
- Phylum: Chordata
- Class: Aves
- Order: Strigiformes
- Family: Strigidae
- Genus: Asio
- Species: A. solomonensis

Binomial name
- Asio solomonensis (Hartert, 1901)

= Fearful owl =

Species of owl

The fearful owl (Asio solomonensis) is a medium-sized owl endemic to the Solomon Islands archipelago. It is generally seen at elevations of up to 2,000 m (6,600 ft) above sea level, where it is found in tall lowland or hill forests.

== Description ==
The fearful owl is a large forest owl growing to a length of about 38 cm (15 in). It has a rufous facial disk and distinct white eyebrows. The inner edge of the facial disk is also white. It is usually mottled brown with deep ochre underparts and blackish streaks. This species may be confused with the Solomon hawk owl, although the latter is slightly smaller and more slender. It is also similar in appearance to the laughing owl, which is now extinct.

Its call is similar to a clear human scream, increasing in volume and tone and emitted in a series, each pulse being repeated at intervals of ten seconds.

== Distribution and habitat ==
The fearful owl is endemic to the island of Bougainville in Papua New Guinea and to Choiseul Island and Santa Isabel Island in the Solomon Islands. It is found in old-growth lowland and hill forest, usually in primary forest but also sometimes in nearby secondary forest and woodland edges up to 2,000 m (6,600 ft) above sea level.

== Behaviour ==
Though generally nesting in tree holes and cracks, nests of the fearful owl have been found on the epiphyte-covered branches of large fig trees (Ficus spp.), both in primary forest and close to the forest edge and near gardens. It primarily feeds on the northern common cuscus (Phalanger orientalis).

== Conservation status ==
The fearful owl is listed as near threatened on the International Union for the Conservation of Nature Red List under criteria C1 and C2a(i), based on its small and declining population. It is threatened by logging and deforestation.
