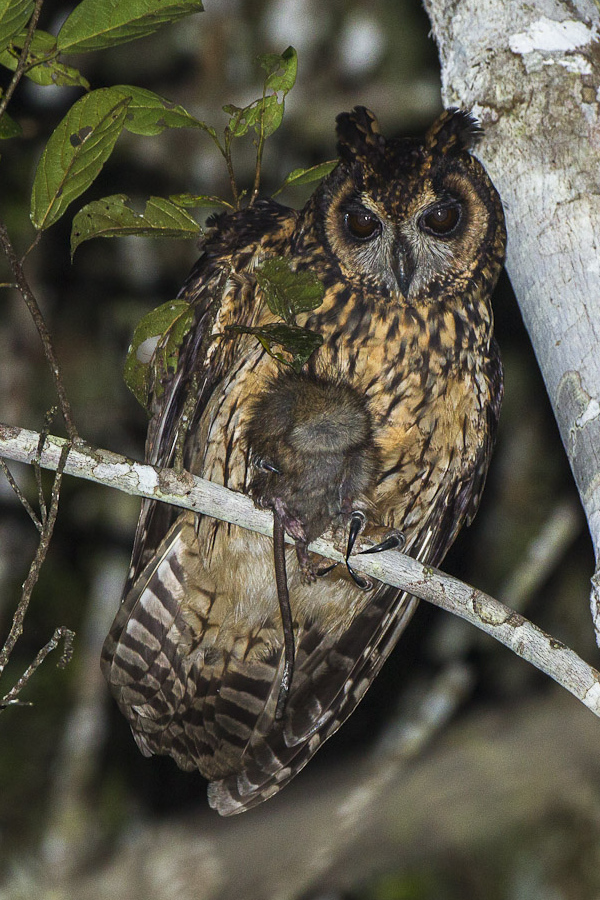

Conservation status
- Least Concern (IUCN 3.1)
- CITES Appendix II (CITES)

Scientific classification
- Kingdom: Animalia
- Phylum: Chordata
- Class: Aves
- Order: Strigiformes
- Family: Strigidae
- Genus: Asio
- Species: A. madagascariensis

Binomial name
- Asio madagascariensis (A. Smith, 1834)

= Madagascar owl =

Species of owl

The Madagascar owl (Asio madagascariensis), also known as the Madagascan owl or Madagascar long-eared owl, is a medium-sized owl endemic to the island of Madagascar. It is sometimes considered to be conspecific with the long-eared owl (Asio otus).

== Description ==
The Madagascar owl is similar in appearance to the Holarctic long-eared owl in that it sits tall and at rest shows prominent ear tufts. The plumage is mainly brown with darker streaks and bars. It has distinctive bright orange eyes. The adults are brown above, and mottled with buff, especially across the mantle. The face is plain dark buff, with darker brown feathers around the eyes, on the edge of the facial disc, and on the ear tufts. The underparts are light brown with darker brown streaks which fade away towards the vent. The juvenile is covered in white down contrasting with a black facial disk and dark brown wings. It ranges from 40–50 cm (16–20 in) in length, making it the largest of the country's owls; females are larger than males.

Its call is usually a series of barks, varying in pitch and volume, but sometimes it will utter a series of more hoot-like notes, described by some as ulooh.

== Distribution and habitat ==
The Madagascar owl is endemic to Madagascar, where it is widespread in the west and centre of the island. It is generally found at elevations ranging from sea level to 1,600 m (5,200 ft), though it occasionally ranges as high as 1,800 m (5,900 ft). It inhabits a variety of woodland habitats, mainly in the drier western forests, although it appears quite adaptable, and also occurs in degraded habitats, even on the central plateau where the forest cover has been fragmented.

== Behaviour ==
Like most owls, the Madagascar owl is nocturnal, roosting by day in dense foliage. It feeds mainly on small mammals, hunting either in the forest or in open areas nearby. Pellets collected from a roost site in southeastern Madagascar were examined and contained the remains of insects, frogs (Boophis), geckoes (Uroplatus), birds (broad-billed roller and Malagasy bulbul), rodents, including tufted-tailed rats (Eliurus spp.) and black rat (Rattus rattus), Commerson's leaf-nosed bats (Hipposideros commersoni), and mouse lemurs (Microcebus spp.).

Little is known about its breeding biology. It is thought to lay its eggs in stick nests created by other animals, like the closely related long-eared owl.
