= Never Give In (Pato Banton album) =

Studio album by Pato Banton
- Released: 1987
- Studio: Sine Wave Studios, Montreal, Québec
- Genre: Reggae; dancehall; roots reggae; digital dancehall
- Length: 55:48
- Label: Greensleeves
- Producer: Pato Banton; G.T. Haynes; Lesburn Thomas

Pato Banton chronology
Mad Professor Captures Pato Banton (1985)	Never Give In (1987)	Visions of the World (1989)

Never Give In is the second album by English reggae artist Pato Banton, released by Greensleeves Records in 1987. By the release of the record, Banton had built a long-time following as an MC and deejay thanks to collaborations with other reggae artists like Mad Professor, and momentum-building tours around the United Kingdom, United States and Europe. He recorded the album with producers G.T. Haynes and Lesburn Thomas and worked with the Studio Two Crew from his native Birmingham. The record displays Banton's humorous approach to serious subjects such as drugs and poverty, which he delivers via singing and toasting, whilst the music balances roots reggae with nascent digital dancehall, with accessible grooves and a punctuating horn section. The record features collaborations with Ranking Roger, Paul Shaffer and Steel Pulse.

Upon release, music critics praised the album for Banton's charisma and impressions of other people, particularly his mother. An EP containing different versions of his collaboration with Ranking Roger, "Pato & Roger Come Again", was issued in 1988, whilst a "20th Anniversary Edition" of Never Give In was released in 2007 by Cornerstone R.A.S. The song "Don't Sniff Coke" went on to be considered Banton's signature song, whilst the album itself has been credited for foreseeing future developments in contemporary reggae.

== Background ==
Hailing from Birmingham, Pato Banton had become a popular reggae MC in the city during his teen years, and sung with the reggae band Crucial Music. His stature rose nationally when appearing alongside Ranking Roger on "Pato and Roger a Go Talk", a song from the Beat's third album Special Beat Service (1982). He followed this with a series of moderately successful singles for Fashion Records, including "Hello Tosh Got a Toshiba", which peaked at reached number three in the British independent reggae charts. In 1985, he guested on UB40's Baggariddim album and worked with dub producer Mad Professor on a collaborative album, Mad Professor Captures Pato Banton (1985), which fused Mad Professor's style with Banton's pop inclinations and extended vocal efforts, including earlier versions of Never Give In tracks "My Opinion", "Gwarn!" and "King Step".

Banton's official debut album, Never Give In was recorded by the artist at Sine Wave Studios with engineer Alan McKercher and producers G.T. Haaynes and Lesburn Thomas, who co-produced the record with Banton. The toaster was joined by backing vocalists Venus and Friends & Relations, whilst he employed the Studio Two Crew as his backing band, with the exception of one song, which instead features Steel Pulse. The genesis for the album came when Banton was working with the Studio Two Crew a year earlier, spending the intermittent year rehearsing and playing shows around the United Kingdom and Europe. Overall, the record features three guitarists, three bassists, three keyboardists, two drummers, a percussionist, and guest trumpeters, trombonists and saxophonists. Banton was more popular in the US than the UK when recording the album due to his then-recent touring there, something he balanced with his British tour of spring 1988. According to writer Sarah Kilby, there were fears among his white American audience, won over by the MC's "banter and wit", that he could become "too serious".

== Composition ==
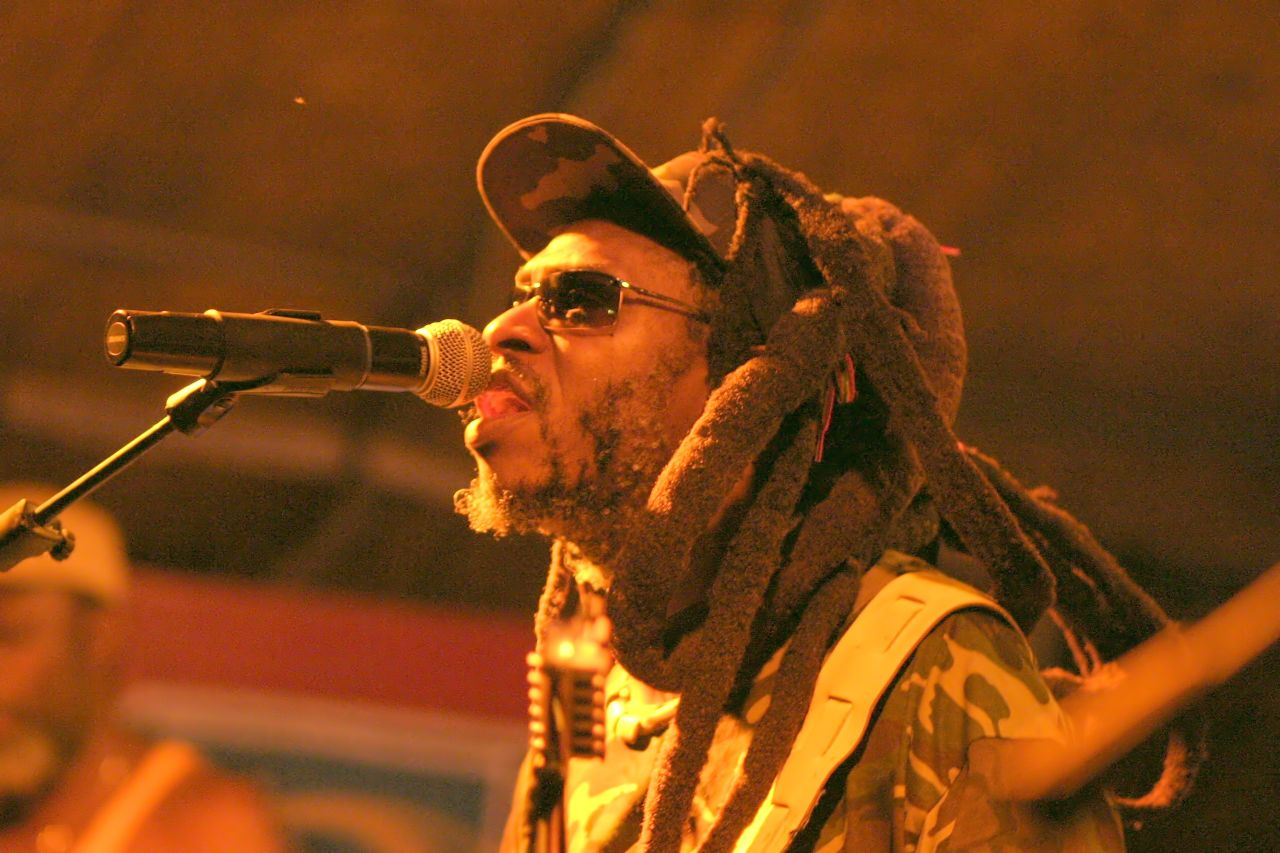
David Hinds, who appears on Never Give In as a member of Steel Pulse.

According to writer James Ferguson, Never Give In combines accessible grooves with nascent, digital dancehall music, with Banton's "just-gritty-enough" style and "streetwise verses" rubbing distinctively against digital rhythms, as exemplified on "Don't Sniff Coke". However, by employing Birmingham groups the Studio Two Crew and Steel Pulse, Banton was said by The Rough Guide to Reggae to have "ignored the digital revolution for earlier-sounding roots rhythms". Writers Dave Schulps and Ira Robbins write that the Studio Two Crew provide heavy reggae rhythms punctuated by "colorful horns and rock-oriented lead guitar". Throughout the album, Banton sings, toasts and "speed-raps" humorously about subjects such as poverty, war and drugs, comically impersonating his mother on three songs, as well as his wife and a frightened riot victim elsewhere. Parry Gettelman of The Orlando Sentinel said that Never Give In and Banton's other early albums showed him deliver "serious messages with a light, comedic touch", highlighting "Don't Sniff Coke" for being seriocomic. Banton would reflect that, from Never Give In onward, "my main goal has always been to spread truth, beauty and goodness through reggae music."

Many of the songs are semiautobiographical, such as "Don't Sniff Coke", which features a rapped monologue, and "Hello Tosh", which refers to electronics company Toshiba rather than reggae artist Peter Tosh, while "Handsworth Riot" discusses the 1985 riots that occurred in the rough, titular Birmingham inner-city and again exemplifies Banton's mimicry. The opening "Absolute Perfection", written as theme music for the cult film Back to the Beach, is a duet between Banton and Paul Shaffer. According to writer Jo-Ann Greene, the "militant" title track blends roots reggae with rap and "a screaming guitar". "Gwarn!" is a fast-speed toast, while the lively "Pato & Roger Come Again" features Steel Pulse and Ranking Roger and was the follow-up to "Pato and Roger a Go Talk"; Greene described it as Banton returning the favour to Roger. James Renford guests on "Settle Satan", playing alto saxophone.

== Release and reception ==
Professional ratings
Review scores
Source	Rating
AllMusic	5/5 stars
NME	9/10
Virgin Encyclopaedia of Eighties Music	3/5 stars

Never Give In was released in the UK by Greensleeves Records in 1987. An EP containing different versions of "Pato & Roger Come Again" followed in 1988. In a review for NME, Sarah Kilby called Never Give In a strong and "surprisingly melodious" album "in the best traditions of British reggae". She considered the record to successfully pitch "mournful echoes of UB40" against a triumphant, Burning Spear-style horn section, whilst feeling Banton had become more thoughtful than on earlier efforts, coming across as "fresh, funny and committed to giving your ears the toasting they deserve". Option wrote that Never Give In provides an "impressive showcase" for Banton's distinctive style as "an MC toaster," further praising the music for being full of texture and fusing "a very danceable pop ethic" with Banton's "wide knowledge and understanding of reggae music."

In a retrospective review, Jo-Ann Greene of AllMusic named it an "Album Pick" and wrote that, typical of "the best toasters" and deejays, Banton possesses a "quick wit" and entertains with his imitations of his mother, which are "worthy of a standup comic". She wrote that Banton established his reputation with Never Give In and while many of the songs "softened with age" as they became live favourites, "here they are still razor-sharp." Dave Schulps and Ira Robbins of Trouser Press praised how Banton laced humour into "his advice on how to behave in Babylon", describing his impersonations of other people as "hilarious". According to The Rough Guide to Rock, the seeds of Banton's future crossover success was "already apparent" on the album. "Don't Sniff Coke" became Banton's signature song, and he would play it live as his encore, whilst according to Greene, it became a "ganja anthem" and "was of surprisingly little use to the Just Say No brigade." In 1989, it was sampled on the Beastie Boys' song "The Sounds of Science". Several of the album's songs, including the title track and "Don't Sniff Coke", appeared on Banton's best-of compilation album Collections (1994).

Jason Ferguson of the Miami New Times reflected that Never Give In was "a watershed moment" in that it "marked the beginning of the contemporary era of reggae." According to Ferguson, the genre had "been in a holding pattern" following Bob Marley's 1981 death, with roots reggae becoming more popular following Marley's" worldwide deification" and "[t]oo few black artists [...] modifying the sound, while white (particularly British) artists saw fit to experiment." He wrote that the "black toaster from Birmingham" split the difference between The Beat and UB40's "accessible white-reggae grooves" and the emergent "digital bubbling of dancehall," and that the combination of digital production and shrewd lyrics "essentially laid the groundwork for the hundreds of dancehall and contemporary reggae records that followed." On 9 October 2007, a "20th Anniversary Edition" of the album was released by Cornerstone R.A.S., featuring bonus material. Reviewing the reissue in his piece, Ferguson said that while Banton's combination of grittiness and pop abilities made the album appealing, his positive vibe had grown "tiresome" and the album's "thin production values" had aged despite the remastered sound, but considered the record important for being "ahead of the game".

== Track listing ==
All tracks composed and arranged by Pato Banton; except where noted

1. "Absolute Perfection" (Jack Butler, Paul Shaffer) – 3:33
2. "My Opinion" – 4:51
3. "Don't Worry" – 5:18
4. "Handsworth Riot" – 4:48
5. "Gwarn!" – 4:47
6. "Too Much War" – 4:35
7. "Pato & Roger Come Again" – 3:43
8. "Never Give In" – 5:04
9. "Don't Sniff Coke" – 4:03
10. "Settle Satan" – 5:08
11. "King Step" – 5:48
12. "Hello Tosh" – 3:50

=== 20th Anniversary Edition (2008) ===
==== Disc one bonus tracks ====
13. "Drive-By Shooting" - 6:27
14. "Everybody Has A Dream" - 3:46

==== Pato Banton Live bonus disc ====
1. "Don't Sniff Coke"
2. "Niceness"
3. "Bubbling Hot"
4. "Gwarn"
5. "Settle Satan"
6. "Life Is A Miracle"
7. "Jamming"
8. "Legalize It (Acapella)"

== Personnel ==
Adapted from the liner notes of Never Give In

Vocalists

- Pato Banton – vocals
- Paul Shaffer – vocals
- Ranking Roger – vocals
- Venus – backing vocals
- Friends & Relations – backing vocals

Musicians

- Lenford "Deaco" Hare – bass
- Chris Drake – bass
- Alvin Exen – bass
- David "Skins" Forskins – drums
- Bo Wade – drums
- Steve "Girzzly" Nisbett – drums
- Donovan "Magoo" Newell – guitar
- Jack Butler – guitar
- David Hinds – guitar
- Glasses Thompson – keyboards
- Mike Peters – keyboards
- Selwyn Brown – keyboards
- James Renford – alto saxophone
- Bryon Bailey – tenor saxophone
- Steve Morrison – trombone
- Alan Francis – trumpet
- Raymond "Bongo Simeon" Walker – percussion

Technical

- Pato Banton – production
- G.T. Haynes – production
- Lesburn Thomas – production
- Alan McKercher – engineering
