= Ray Watts (singer) =

Singer (1957–2000)

- Ray Watts performing with Beshara, 1985

Background information
- Also known as: Ray Beshara, Ray (Beshara) Watts
- Born: 26 January 1957; Guadeloupe
- Died: 12 February 2000 (aged 43)
- Genres: Reggae, lovers rock, roots reggae, soul, dance
- Occupations: Musician, singer, songwriter
- Instruments: Vocals, guitar, bass
- Years active: 1976–2000
- Labels: Celmaw Records
- Website: www.besharamusic.com

Ray "Beshara" Watts (26 January 1957 – 12 February 2000) was a singer and songwriter born on the island of Guadeloupe and who lived in Birmingham, England. He was also the lead singer, principal songwriter and a core-founding member of the British reggae band Beshara. As part of Beshara, Watts had success in the UK reggae charts and supported many artists, whilst making several television appearances.

== Solo career ==
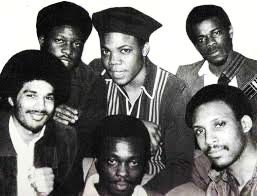
Ray Watts (in the middle of the back row) as part of the band Beshara in 1983

Watts began his solo career in the early 1990s and worked with many different record producers. During that time, he travelled to America and worked with the Inner City record producer, Kevin Saunderson. These recordings are yet to be released. He also performed guitar on the Inner City single "Till We Meet Again (Reese in Rio Mix)".

Watts then featured on the recordings "Gotta Be a Change" and "United We Stand" with Pato Banton whilst supporting or sharing the stage with artists such as Pato Banton, China Black, CJ Lewis and Adeva.

== Death ==
Watts died in 2000. He was well known and respected within the Birmingham music scene. In 2001, the ex-Beshara band members arranged a memorial tribute concert for Watts at the Irish Centre, Birmingham. Steel Pulse and Beshara along with many other artists from Birmingham, performed at the concert. In the same year, Pato Banton's album Life Is Miracle, which featured a song written by and featuring Watts called "United We Stand", received a Grammy nomination for Best Reggae Album. The song has also featured on the Pato Banton albums Universal Love and Time Come (Brazil Version).

== Discography ==
- Ray (Beshara) Watts – "Shadow of Love (92 Mix)" (1992), Klassic Records
- Ray Beshara – "Bring Back the Love" (1993), Pharaoh Records
