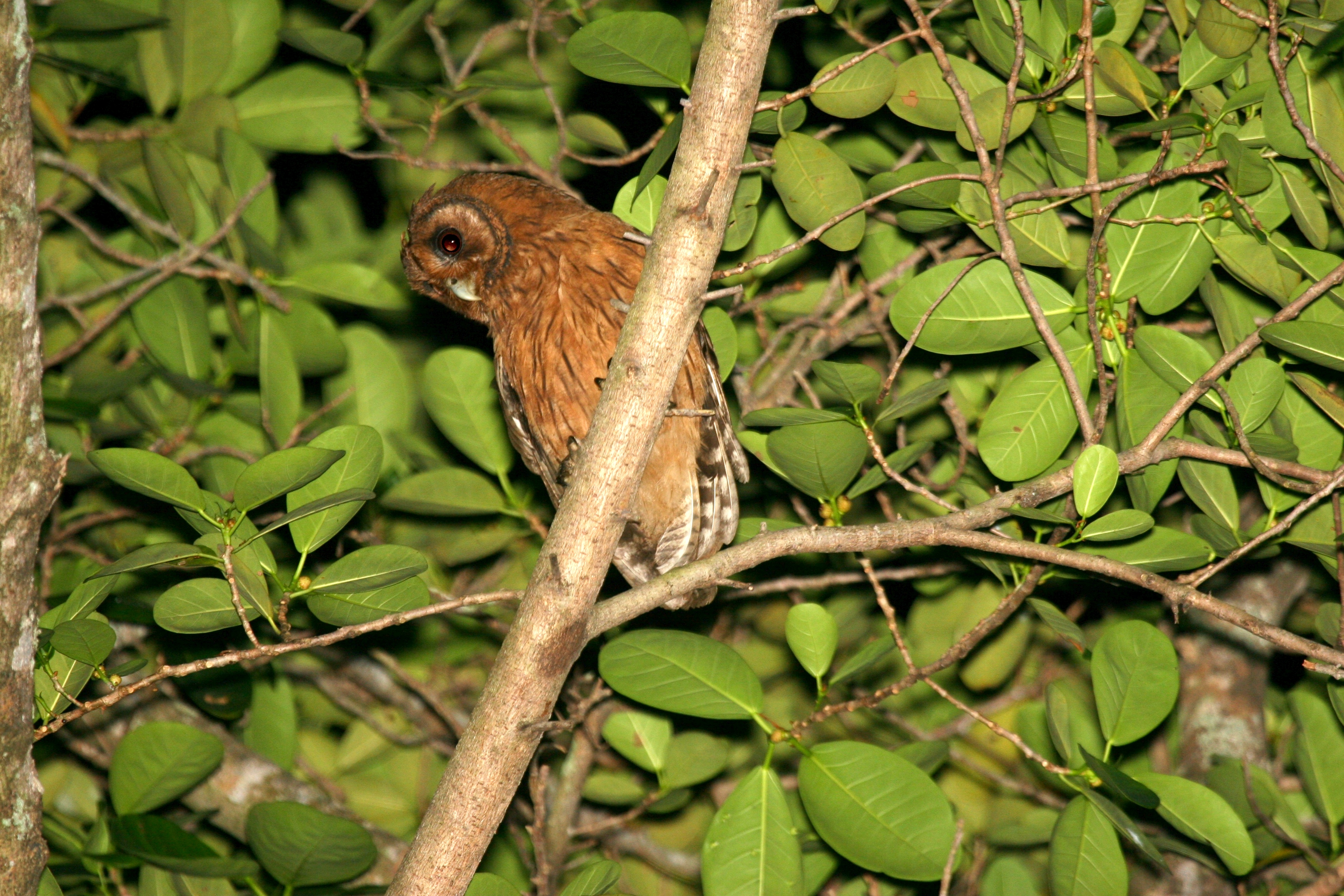

Conservation status
- Least Concern (IUCN 3.1)
- CITES Appendix II

Scientific classification
- Kingdom: Animalia
- Phylum: Chordata
- Class: Aves
- Order: Strigiformes
- Family: Strigidae
- Genus: Asio
- Species: A. grammicus

Binomial name
- Asio grammicus (Gosse, 1847)

Synonyms
- Pseudoscops grammicus Kaup, 1848

= Jamaican owl =

Species of owl

The Jamaican owl (Asio grammicus) is a medium-sized owl that is endemic to the island of Jamaica.

== Taxonomy and systematics ==
The Jamaican owl was previously considered the only member of the genus Pseudoscops, but phylogenetic analysis has reclassified it within Asio. It is monotypic.

== Description ==
The Jamaican owl is 27 to 33 cm (11 to 13 in) long; one specimen of unstated sex weighed 335 g (11.8 oz). This medium-sized owl has long ear tufts, dark brown eyes, and a rufous facial disk rimmed in black-flecked white. The adult's upperparts are rufous with fine dark brown vermiculation. The tail is also rufous, with dark brown bars. The breast and belly are rufous with narrow dark brown streaks. The juvenile's back is light grayish brown and the rest of its plumage is light cinnamon-buff.

== Distribution and habitat ==
The Jamaican owl is found throughout the island of Jamaica. It inhabits a variety of open and semi-open landscapes such as open woodland, forest edges, plantations, and gardens. It is primarily a bird of coastal and lowland areas, but can be found as high as 600 m (2,000 ft) of elevation in the mountains.

== Behavior ==
=== Feeding ===
The Jamaican owl is nocturnal and eats mainly large insects. Its diet also includes spiders, amphibians, lizards, and rodents. There is one record of its taking a bird, a Greater Antillean grackle (Quiscalus niger).

=== Breeding ===
The Jamaican owl's breeding phenology is poorly known. Nesting has been reported between March and October and egg-laying between December and June. It lays a clutch of two eggs in a tree cavity or a concealed tree-fork.

=== Vocalization ===
Adult Jamaican owls make a "[h]igh, quivering hoot and guttural growl".

== Status ==
The IUCN has assessed the Jamaican owl as being of Least Concern. It is considered widespread and common, but "cutting of forest has probably reduced its range and numbers".
